= List of ships named Kenilworth Castle =

Kenilworth Castle is the name of the following ships named for Kenilworth Castle:

- RMS Kenilworth Castle (1903), the first passenger ship of the Union-Castle Line with the name, scrapped in 1937
- RMS Kenilworth Castle (1946), launched in 1944 as the Empire Wilson, sold to the Union-Castle Line in 1946 and renamed Kenilworth Castle, scrapped in 1967.
- HMS Kenilworth Castle, a Castle-class corvette launched in 1943 and scrapped in 1956

== See also ==
- Kenilworth (disambiguation)
