= Edinburgh Castle (disambiguation) =

Edinburgh Castle is a historic fortress in Edinburgh, Scotland.

Edinburgh Castle may also refer to:

- Edinburgh Castle, Jamaica, a plantation house
- SS Edinburgh Castle, an ocean liner
- RMS Edinburgh Castle, an ocean liner
- Edinburgh Castle Hotel, a former pub and live music venue in Adelaide, Australia
- Edinburgh Castle Pub, defunct dive bar in San Francisco, California, U.S.
