= RMS Balmoral Castle =

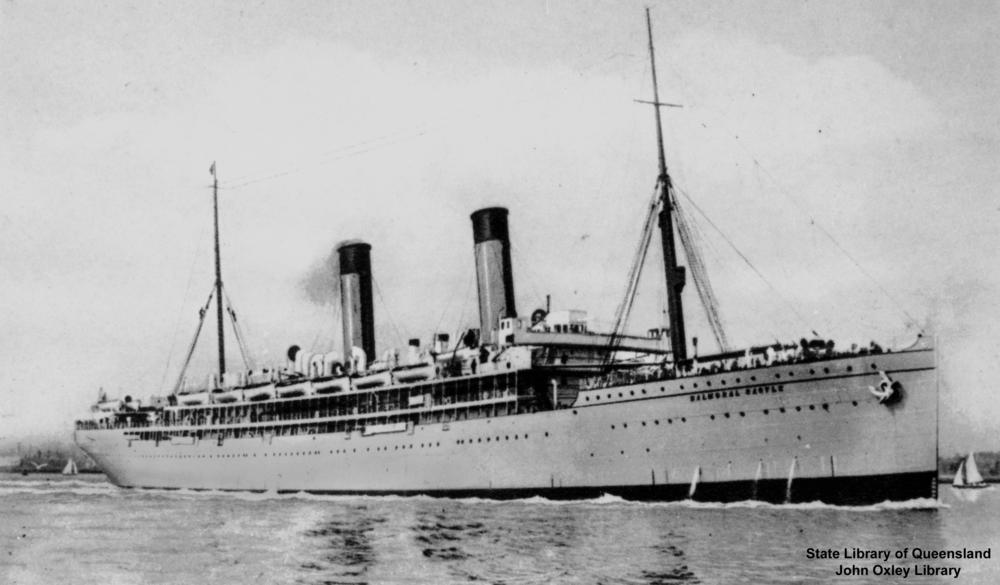
- Balmoral Castle

History

United Kingdom
- Name: Balmoral Castle
- Namesake: Balmoral Castle
- Owner: Union-Castle Line
- Port of registry: (United Kingdom) London
- Route: England – South Africa
- Builder: Fairfield of Govan
- Yard number: 468
- Launched: 13 November 1909
- Completed: 1910
- Fate: arrived for scrapping 19 June 1939

General characteristics
- Type: Ocean liner
- Tonnage: 13,361 GRT
- Length: 180.1 m (591 ft)
- Beam: 19.7 m (65 ft)
- Draught: 9.6 m (31 ft)
- Decks: 4
- Propulsion: Steam 2 quad expansion 1,250 ihp by Fairfield of Govan; 2 × screws
- Speed: 16 knots (30 km/h) service speed
- Notes: sister ship: Edinburgh Castle

RMS Balmoral Castle (1910–1939) was a steamship of the Union-Castle Line

== Career ==
RMS Balmoral Castle, was launched in November 1909 and, after being fitted out, went into the Cape service, as the largest, most powerful and one of the most luxurious ships in service south of the equator. Among other voyages, commanded by vice-admiral Wemyss, it conveyed the Duke and Duchess of Connaught to open the Union Parliament in October 1910. In August 1914 it was one of six ships that each carried 1,000 troops under escort from Capetown to Tilbury Docks, preparatory to their being sent to the war in France and Belgium. The following year it continued on the Cape run, presumably in convoy, escorted by cruisers such as HMS Highflyer, on account of the U-boat menace. In 1918 she acted as flagship of a flotilla of troop carriers bringing soldiers from America and Canada to London. After the Armistice she was employed ferrying Australian soldiers from England to Australia, and with the resumption of trade, carrying wool and wheat on the return journey.

Her 1933 voyage to South Africa and return was a litany of misfortunes: When leaving Southampton on her outward voyage, the pilot fell into the water while being dropped to his boat. She left South Africa on 16 February, then a day out of Capetown on the return journey a stowaway was found mingling with the passengers, and a few days later, just as the ship was leaving Madeira, 25-year-old assistant purser Frederick Hamon was found missing. Presuming he was lost overboard, the captain retraced her path but no sign was found. Then when she berthed at Southampton, and the 359 cases, each containing a gold bar, removed from its steel cage in the specie room inside the mailroom, when unpacked at the Standard Bank of South Africa, one turned out not to contain a 930-ounce gold bar worth £6362 but concrete and iron nails. (Note: This theft had echoes of an earlier mystery – In 1924 three of 49 cases in a consignment of gold bullion in a locked safe were found to be full of pebbles when they were opened in the London bank. The ship on that occasion was the SS Armadale Castle from Capetown.)
