= RMS Transvaal Castle =

Ship built in 1961

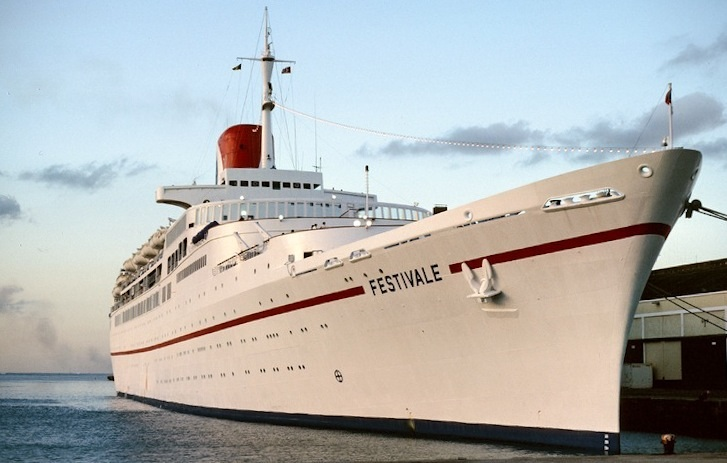
- SS Festivale docked in Barbados on 26 February 1987

History

Bahamas
- Name: 1961–1966: RMS Transvaal Castle; 1966–1969: RMS S.A. Vaal; 1969–1977: TSS S.A. Vaal; 1977–1996: TSS Festivale; 1996–2000: TSS IslandBreeze; 2000–2003: SS The Big Red Boat III; 2003: SS The Big Boat
- Owner: 1961–1966: Union-Castle Line; 1966–1977: Safmarine; 1977–1996: Carnival Cruise Line; 1996–1996: Dolphin Cruise Line; 1996–1998: Thomson Cruises; 1998–2000: Premier Cruise Line
- Route: Southampton, Las Palmas, Cape Town, Port Elizabeth, East London, Durban
- Builder: John Brown & Company, Clydebank, Scotland
- Yard number: 720
- Launched: 17 January 1961
- Completed: December 1961
- Maiden voyage: 18 January 1962
- In service: 1962
- Out of service: September 2000
- Identification: IMO number: 5367623
- Fate: Scrapped at Alang, India in 2003

General characteristics as built, 1961
- Type: Ocean liner
- Tonnage: 32,697 GRT; 16,604 DWT
- Length: 760 ft 2 in (231.70 m)
- Beam: 90 ft 2 in (27.48 m)
- Draught: 32 ft (9.8 m)
- Decks: 8
- Installed power: 44,000 shp (33,000 kW)
- Propulsion: Geared turbines, twin screw
- Speed: 22.5 knots (41.7 km/h; 25.9 mph)
- Capacity: 728 passengers one class
- Crew: 426

General characteristics as rebuilt, 1978
- Type: cruise ship
- Tonnage: 26,632 GRT (Panamanian rules, c.38,000 by UK rules)
- Capacity: 1,432 passengers
- Crew: 579
- Notes: Otherwise the same as built

RMS Transvaal Castle was a British ocean liner built by John Brown & Company, Clydebank, Scotland for the Union-Castle Line for its mail service between Southampton and Durban. In 1966 she was sold to the South Africa-based Safmarine and renamed S.A. Vaal for further service on the same route. Following cessation of the service between the UK and South Africa in 1977 the ship was sold to Carnival Cruise Line and rebuilt in Japan as the cruise ship SS Festivale, re-entering service in 1978. In 1996 she was chartered to Dolphin Cruise Line and renamed IslandBreeze. In 1998 the ship was sold to Premier Cruise Line, which renamed her The Big Red Boat III. Following the bankruptcy of Premier Cruise Line in 2000, The Big Red Boat III was laid up until 2003 when she was sold to scrappers in Alang, India. She was renamed The Big Red Boat for her final voyage to the scrapyard.

== Concept and construction ==
RMS Transvaal Castle was the last in a series of three ships planned by the Union-Castle Line in the 1950s as replacements for the company's oldest ships RMS Arundel Castle, RMS Carnarvon Castle and RMS Winchester Castle. The Transvaal Castle was preceded by the RMS Pendennis Castle (delivered in 1958) and RMS Windsor Castle (delivered in 1960). Pendennis Castle was an enlarged Pretoria Castle from the same builder, Harland & Wolff, but after the Union-Castle/Clan Line merger of 1956, Clan Line management predominated and no further Union-Castle ships were ordered from the Belfast yard. Transvaal Castle was similar to but smaller than Windsor Castle, built by Cammell Laird the previous year. At 32,697 GRT, she was the company's second-largest ship.

Transvaal Castle was launched at Clydebank on 17 January 1961 by Lady Cayzer, wife of the chairman of British & Commonwealth Shipping, and delivered to Union-Castle on 16 December 1961. Like Windsor Castle, she was fully air conditioned and was one of the first British built passenger ships to have a bulbous bow. However, the major difference between the new ship and her fleetmates was that she was conceived as an experimental "hotel" ship, with all passenger accommodation in one class rather than the first and tourist split of the other mail ships. This concept had been used in the three round Africa service ships of the Rhodesia Castle class built in 1951/1952, but this was its first (and only) application to the mail fleet. A further innovation was the use of female waiting staff, known as "stewardettes". These were later to be a feature of the other ships in the mail fleet, but the one class concept was restricted to this one ship, the others retaining two class to the end of their service.

== Service history ==
=== 1961–1977: United Kingdom—South Africa liner service ===
Transvaal Castle set out on her maiden voyage from Southampton to Durban on 18 January 1962. In July 1965, the mail service was accelerated with the Southampton-Cape Town voyage cut from 13½ days to 11½ days. The previous departure from Southampton at 16:00 on Thursday, every week was altered to 13:00 every Friday.

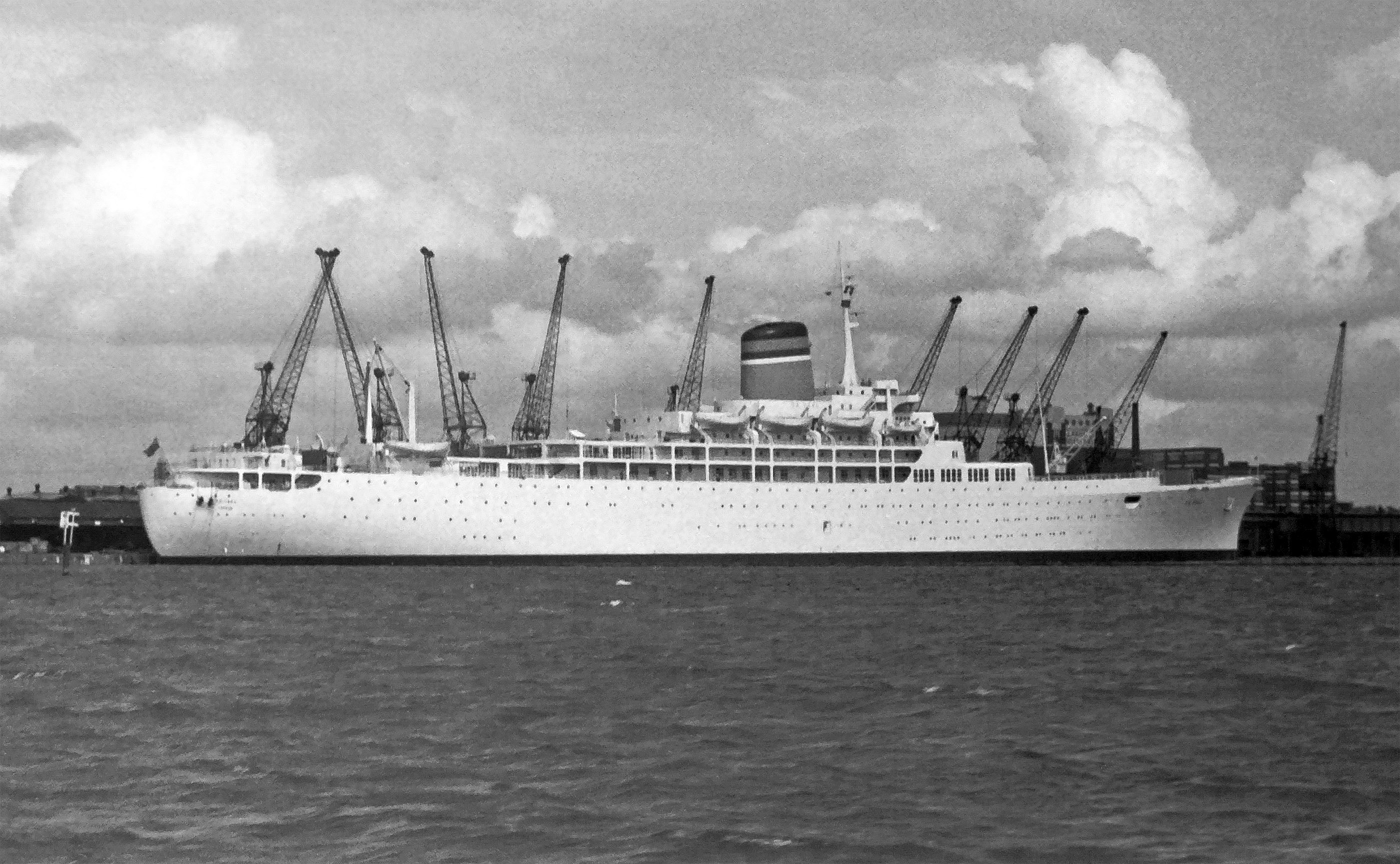
S.A. Vaal in Southampton, 1967

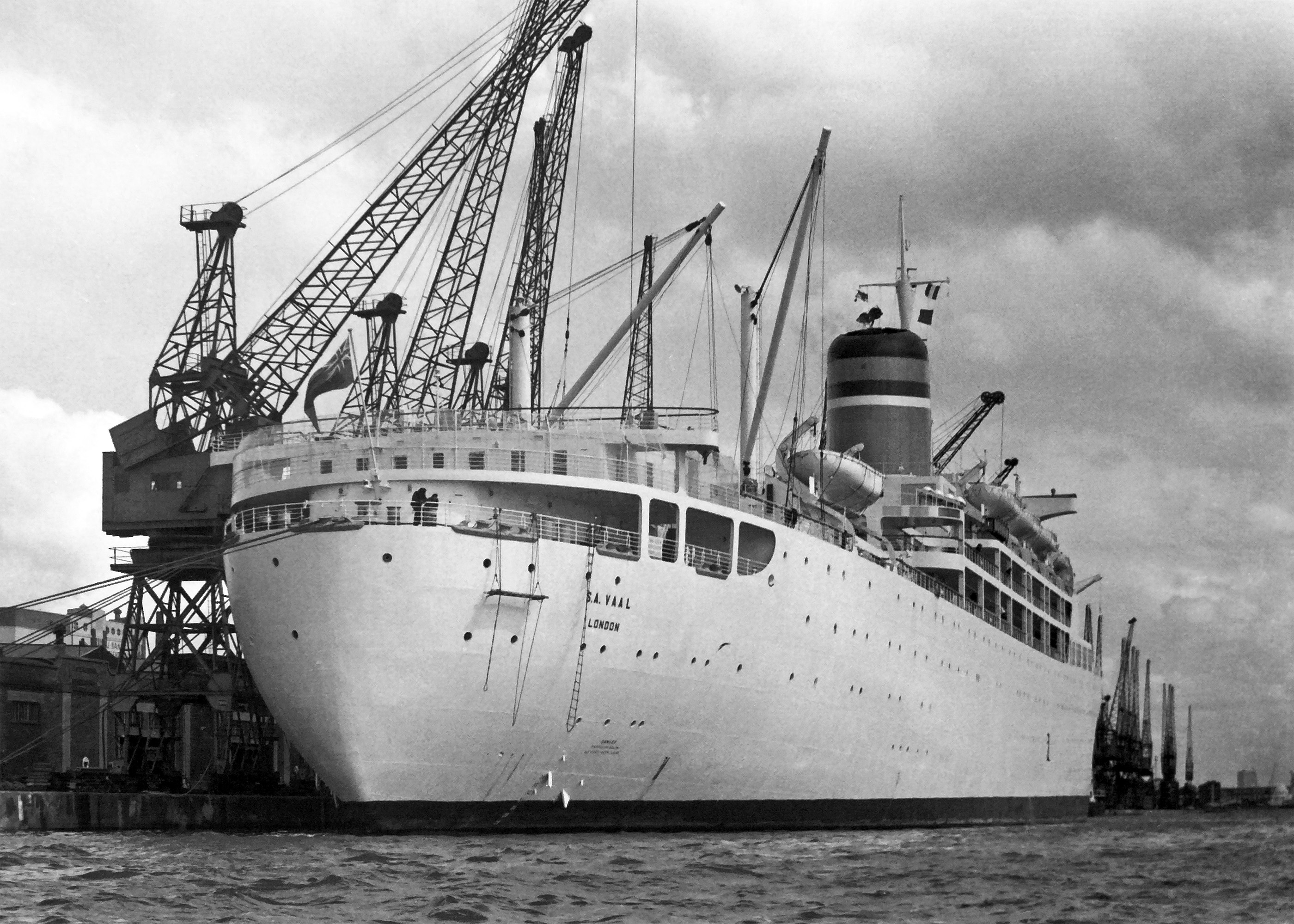
S.A Vaal in Southampton, 1967

In order to meet South African demands for a greater share in the running of the mail service, the Transvaal Castle and her fleetmate RMS Pretoria Castle (respectively the youngest and oldest units of the fleet) were transferred to the South African Marine Corporation (Safmarine) in 1966. The Transvaal Castle was taken over by Safmarine on 12 January 1966 and renamed S.A. Vaal. The ship's hull was repainted white and her funnel changed to Safmarine's mid-grey, with three thin lines of the then South African national colours: orange, white and blue. Although now under Safmarine ownership, both ships were bareboat chartered back to Union-Castle and continued to be crewed by the same crews as the other mail ships. RMS S.A. Vaal remained registered in London and continued to operate on the same service as before. Thus the UK—South Africa service became a joint operation between Union-Castle and Safmarine. In February 1969 the S.A. Vaal and S.A. Oranje were re-registered in Cape Town. but continued to be managed and crewed by Union-Castle, with a few Safmarine officers in later years. The mail ship operation was always managed from London.

The Union-Castle/Safmarine joint mailship service declined heavily during the 1970s. This was due to a combination of adverse economic factors including the loss of earnings from high value cargoes, which were increasingly being carried in the more efficient, revolutionary new container ships. With the large increase in oil prices in 1973, the mail ship schedule was extended by one day to allow more economical steaming. After Pendennis Castle was withdrawn in June 1976 just two mailships remained on the route – Union-Castle's Windsor Castle and Safmarine's S.A. Vaal – in addition to Union-Castle's last cargo/passenger vessels RMMV Good Hope Castle and RMMV Southampton Castle (carrying just 12 passengers each) and other chartered cargo-only tonnage. The jointly owned passenger liner service ceased completely in October 1977, with the S.A. Vaal being the last to arrive in Southampton on 10 October 1977.

=== 1978–2003: Cruise ship service ===
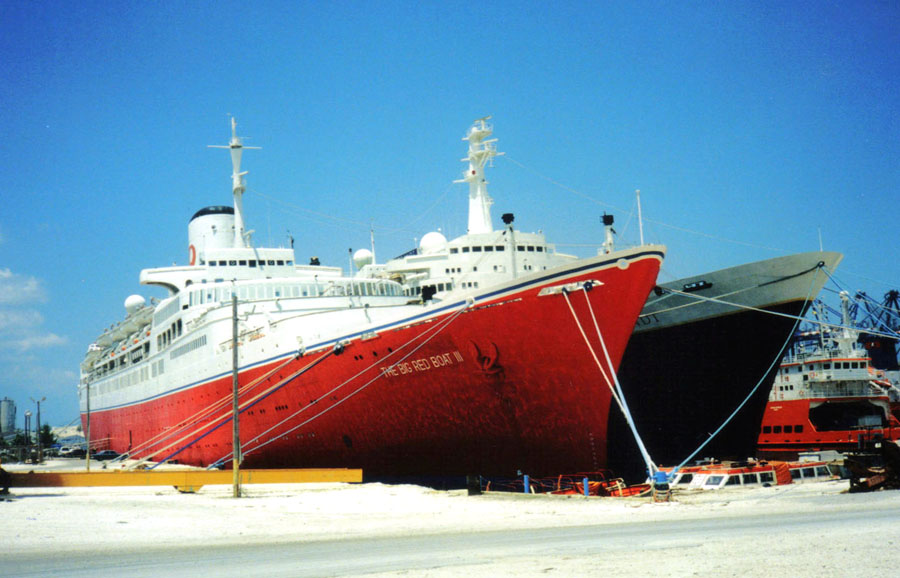
The Big Red Boat III and Rembrandt laid up in Freeport's harbor on 25 August 2001.

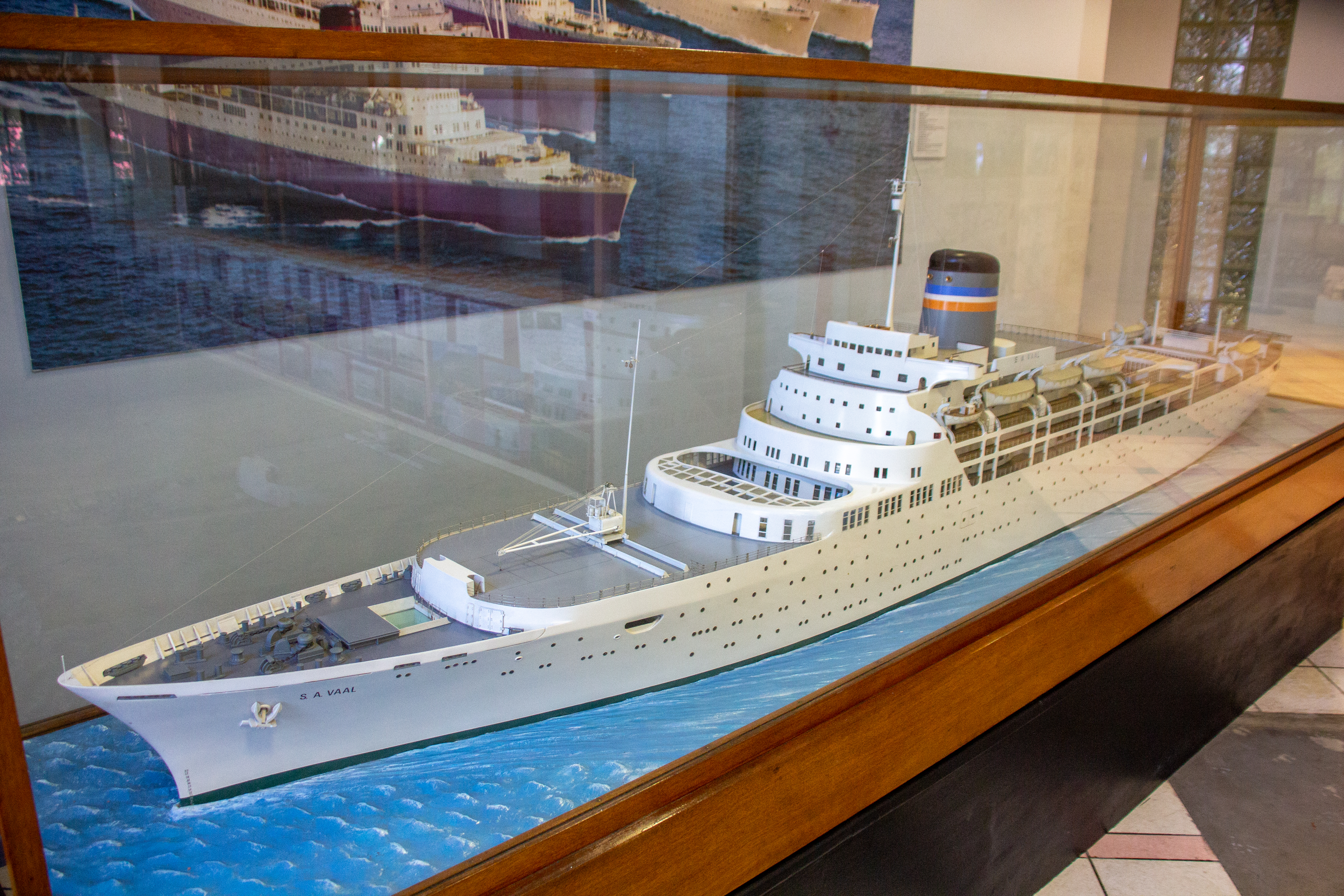
A model of the ship at the South African Maritime Museum

S.A. Vaal was sold to Carnival Cruise Line and renamed SS Festivale. Carnival converted her into a cruise ship in Japan at a cost of $30 million, removing former cargo holds and doubling the vessel's passenger capacity, installing lounges, discothèques and casinos. The vessel became one of Carnival's "First Generation" fun ships. Although the former mail ship's superstructure was greatly enlarged, registration in Panama resulted in her tonnage dropping to 26,632 (by UK rules it would have been around 38,000). Soon after entering service in 1978, the Festivale was used as a floating location for the TV miniseries The French Atlantic Affair, starring Telly Savalas, Chad Everett and Michelle Phillips.

Carnival chartered the Festivale to Dolphin Cruise Line in 1996. They renamed her IslandBreeze, and she annually operated cruises under charter to Thomson Holidays. In 1998, she was sold to Premier Cruise Line, but continued under charter for Thomson until 2000, when she was renamed The Big Red Boat III and repainted red for Texas based cruises.

Premier Cruises filed for bankruptcy in 2000, and their ships were seized in various ports in the Caribbean, North America, and Europe. By now being older, outmoded and in disrepair, the Big Red Boat III could find no work and was sold to shipbreakers in Alang, India in the summer of 2003. She was scrapped in 2003–2004.
