= RMS Windsor Castle (1959) =

Ocean liner launched in 1960

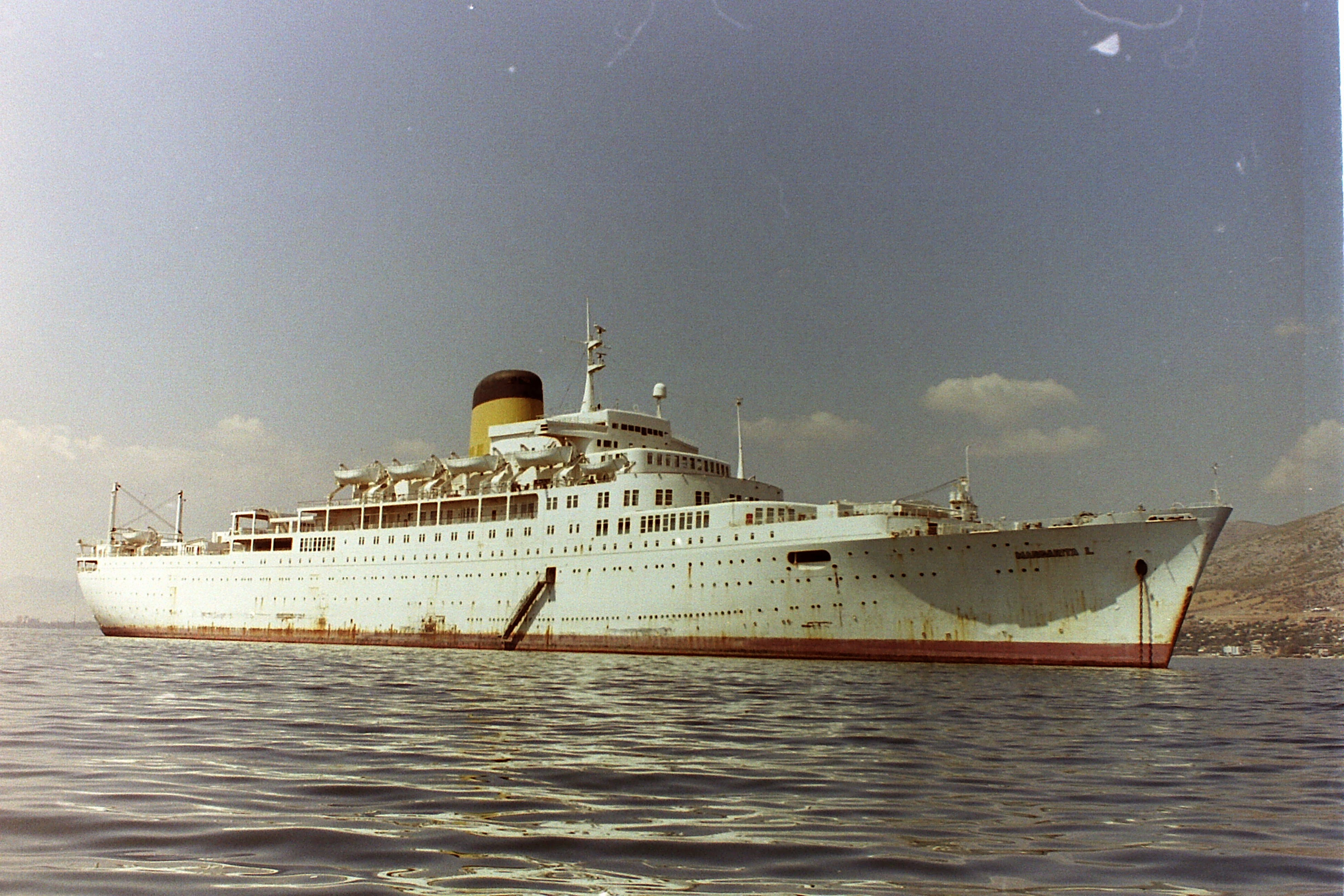
- The Margarita L laid up at Eleusis in 2002

History

United Kingdom
- Name: RMS Windsor Castle
- Owner: Union-Castle Mail Steamship Company
- Port of registry: London, UK
- Route: Southampton-Las Palmas-Cape Town-Port Elizabeth-East London-Durban
- Builder: Cammell, Laird & Company (Shipbuilders & Engineers) Ltd., Birkenhead
- Yard number: 1287
- Laid down: 9 December 1957
- Launched: 23 June 1959
- Completed: June 1960
- Maiden voyage: 18 August 1960
- Out of service: 19 September 1977
- Identification: IMO number: 5391923
- Fate: Scrapped in 2005 at Alang, India

General characteristics
- Tonnage: As built, 37,640 GRT, 1967, 36,123 GRT. 1972, 36,277 GRT
- Length: 783 ft 6 in (238.81 m)
- Beam: 93 ft 11 in (28.63 m)
- Draught: 32 ft 2 in (9.80 m)
- Installed power: 49,000shp
- Propulsion: Geared turbines, twin screw
- Speed: 22.5 knots (41.7 km/h; 25.9 mph) (service speed); 23.5 knots (43.5 km/h; 27.0 mph) (maximum)
- Capacity: 191 1st class, 591 tourist class
- Crew: 475

RMS Windsor Castle was a passenger and cargo liner operated by the Union-Castle Line on its Cape Mail service between Britain and South Africa. Completed in 1960, she was the line's largest Royal Mail Ship on that route.

Windsor Castle was notable for the high standard, if conservative, design of her public rooms in a "traditional" first class and "contemporary" tourist class configuration, which by clever arrangement, afforded both classes public rooms and open-deck areas facing forward and aft. The spacious passenger lounges and dining rooms were designed by eminent British architects. Windsor Castle was air-conditioned throughout the passenger and crew areas. Facilities included a fully equipped hospital, two outdoor swimming pools, a health spa and a theatre/cinema. A large amount of dry and refrigerated cargo space, cargo wine tanks and a specie (bullion) room, were also fitted.

== Concept and construction ==
The steam-turbine engined, Windsor Castle was the second in a series of three ships planned by Union-Castle in the 1950s as replacements for the company's oldest ships Arundel Castle, Carnarvon Castle and Winchester Castle. Windsor Castle was preceded by Pendennis Castle (delivered in 1958) and followed by Transvaal Castle (delivered in 1961).

In January 1956, Union-Castle merged with Cayzer, Irvine & Co Ltd's Clan Line and a number of other lines to form British and Commonwealth Shipping, although the constituents retained their individual identities. By the time the merger was finalised, the keel of Pendennis Castle had already been laid at Union-Castle's usually contracted builders Harland and Wolff - in November 1955. Initially conceived as a sister to the 1948 built Pretoria Castle and Edinburgh Castle, new owners B&C required substantial improvements to the plans for the ship, including lengthening the hull some 16 feet (4.9 m) to enable fin stabilisers to be fitted. Industrial disputes at Harland and Wolff delayed the construction of Pendennis Castle, culminating in the vessel being launched without ceremony on Christmas Eve 1957, 14 days after her naming and blessing. She was the last Union-Castle ship to be built at the Belfast yard. Windsor Castle thus became the first passenger, cargo and mail vessel for the South African service, ordered from inception by B&C and was a very different (and more modern) ship than her predecessors

The last flagship of the Union-Castle Line was built by Cammell Laird Shipbuilders at Birkenhead, Merseyside and launched on 23 June 1959 by Her Majesty Queen Elizabeth, the Queen Mother. Windsor Castle - the only Union-Castle ship ordered from Cammell Laird - was also briefly the largest liner built in England, until surpassed by the 41,910 GRT Orient Line's Oriana launched on 3 November 1959.

== Service history ==
=== "Cape Mail" service 1960–1977 ===
The Windsor Castle in Las Palmas

After sea-trials and a brief delivery sailing with Union-Castle office staff acting as passengers, Windsor Castle's commercial maiden voyage was from Southampton to Durban on 18 August 1960. Joining a long established pattern followed by the company's ships engaged in the Cape mail service, the vessel sailed regularly to South Africa, via Madeira (occasionally), to Las Palmas, then Cape Town, Port Elizabeth, East London and finally Durban, returning to Southampton by the same route. In 1965 the long planned acceleration of the mail service took place, with the Southampton-Cape Town voyage being reduced from 13 1/2 days to 11 1/2 days. The three remaining pre-war motor ships were unable to maintain the new schedule and were replaced by two fast cargo ships. Windsor Castle was now required (like her fleetmates) to sail at her designed 22 1/2 knots and the time honoured Thursday at 4 o'clock departure became Friday at 1 o'clock

By the mid-1970s the operation of Windsor Castle and her Union-Castle/Safmarine mailship consorts had become unprofitable due to a combination of factors: the introduction of the 'Jumbo Jet' which moved large numbers quickly and economically; further from the fading attraction for new settlers of the increasingly politically isolated South Africa of the time; also challenging the labour-intensive conventional cargo facilities in the mailships were the hugely successful new container ships which enabled cargoes to be moved faster and more efficiently. Simultaneous with these factors, by tradition, B&C passenger vessels employed mostly British officers and crews (with some South African officers in the two Safmarine ships S.A. Vaal and S.A. Oranje), under terms which could not be sustained in a failing market. Finally, the serious mid-1970s hike in the cost of heavy furnace oil was the death knell for the combined B&C managed passenger fleet and for many other fuel-hungry steamers of the period. Windsor Castle sailed on her last voyage for Union-Castle on 12 August 1977. She finally departed Cape Town at 16:00 hours on 6 September 1977, returning to Southampton on 19 September 1977.

=== The Latsis years 1977–2004 ===
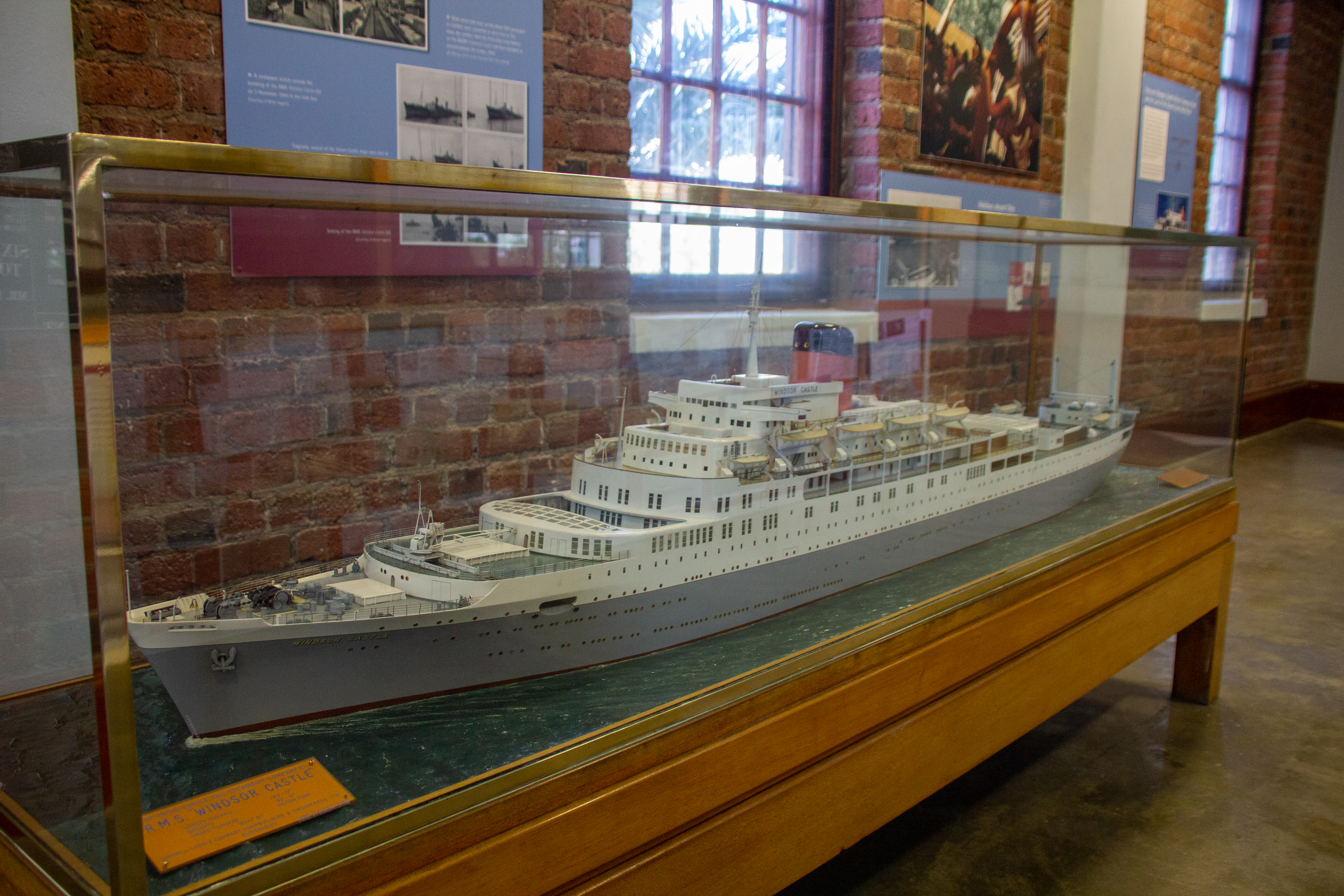
A model of the ship at the South African Maritime Museum

The vessel was promptly sold to Yiannis Latsis the Greek finance and shipping magnate, charity patron and benefactor, and renamed Margarita L, in honour of his daughter. The ship left Southampton for the last time on 3 October 1977, with her former Union-Castle 'vermillion' funnel paint replaced by that of Latsis 'buff' yellow and under the flag of convenience of Panama. After a refit in Piraeus Margarita L was despatched to Jeddah, Saudi Arabia, for use as an office, leisure centre and static accommodation facility for one of Latsis's companies, Petrola International SA. A special jetty was built for Margarita L, equipped with car parks, swimming pools and other sports facilities for the contracted workers. The vessel remained at her berth until 1983 when she proceeded to Bahrain for dry-docking and overhaul, returning directly to Jeddah. In June 1991, Margarita L was sent back to Piraeus under her own steam, to be laid up. The vessel subsequently became private accommodation for Latsis and his family off Eleusis, Greece. Margarita L was reportedly first offered for sale in 1998, although it was not until after the death of Latsis in 2003 that the owners finally confirmed the now 43-year-old ship to be available.

=== Reactivation for disposal 2005 ===
In the absence of any other substantive offers, Latsis Lines sold Margarita L in December 2004 to an undisclosed party, with the view to disposing of the vessel to Indian scrap merchants. After some months were spent reactivating long idle main engines, the vessel sailed to India for the breakers on 14 April 2005, under the shortened name Rita, despite a number of attempts to save her. The ship's last voyage under steam was from Piraeus, Greece to Alang, India, via Port Said, the Suez Canal and Aden. Having arrived off Alang, Rita was turned back to United Arab Emirates waters, while the interim owners apparently awaited an improvement in the value of scrap steel. Later, both the ship and her attendant tug suffered engine failures, however, the tug was repaired and successfully completed the tow back to Alang.

While the larger part of the ship's career was spent either in static duties or lay-up, she had a notably long existence; outlasting her 1960–61 built British liner contemporaries Canberra (by almost 8 years), Empress of Canada (by almost 2 years) and Oriana (by a few months).

Between 2001 and 2004, all three other remaining former Union-Castle ships had gone to the breakers: SS Amerikanis (built 1952 as Kenya Castle), was scrapped in 2001, Big Red Boat III (built 1961 as Transvaal Castle), in 2003–04 and the veteran Princesa Victoria (built 1936 as Dunnottar Castle) also went in 2004. "The Windsor", as she was once affectionately known by many passengers and crew, was the last Castle, ship to go. All four were dismantled on Alang beach.

As Windsor Castle, she made a total of 124 round voyages, carried around 270,000 passengers and steamed over 1.6 million nautical miles. She never missed a scheduled sailing. The demolition of the ship began on 18 August 2005, exactly 45 years to the day since her maiden voyage from Southampton to Durban.
