= RMS Edinburgh Castle =

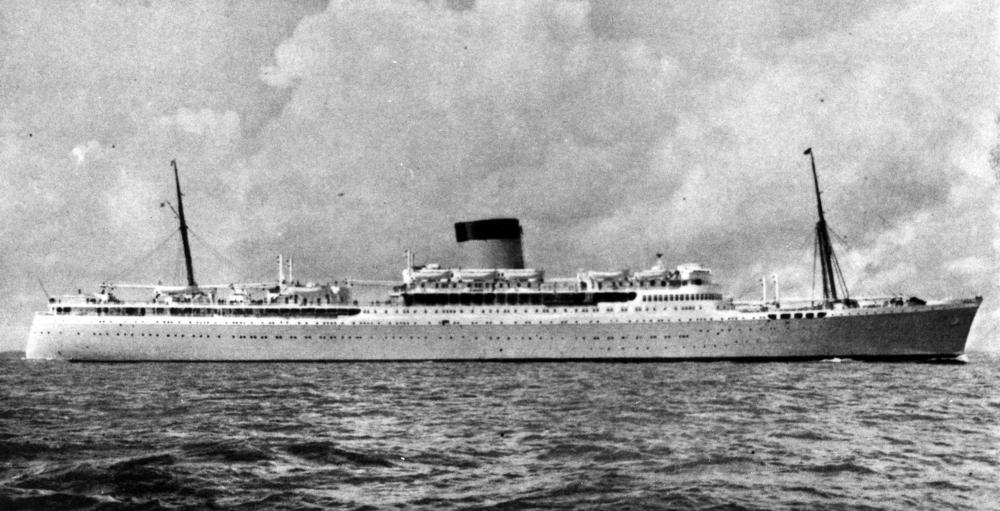
- Edinburgh Castle

History

United Kingdom
- Name: Edinburgh Castle
- Owner: Union-Castle Line
- Operator: Union-Castle Line
- Builder: Harland and Wolff, Belfast, Northern Ireland
- Launched: 16 October 1947
- Completed: 1948
- Maiden voyage: November 1948
- Fate: Scrapped 1976

General characteristics
- Tonnage: 28,705 GRT
- Length: 747 ft (228 m)
- Beam: 74 ft (23 m)
- Propulsion: Steam turbines
- Speed: 22 knots (41 km/h) (service speed)
- Capacity: 755
- Crew: 400

Edinburgh Castle was an ocean liner operated by the Union-Castle Line in service between Britain and South Africa during the mid 20th century. She and her sister ship the RMS Pretoria Castle were built to replace the first SS Edinburgh Castle and SS Warwick Castle which were lost during World War 2.

She was built by Harland and Wolff of Belfast at a cost of £2.5 million, and was launched on 16 October 1947, by Princess Margaret. She made her maiden voyage in November 1948. She was refitted twice in the mid-1960s, with modifications externally to her masts and internally with the addition of air conditioning and added private bathrooms. She was taken out of service in 1976 after fuel oil prices rose sharply in the preceding years, and sailed from Southampton for scrapping in Taiwan in April.

Edinburgh Castle measured 28,705 gross register tons, and was 747 feet (228 m) long with a beam of 84 feet (26 m). She was powered by steam turbines, which drove twin propellers that gave her a service speed of 22 knots (25 mph). She had a passenger capacity of 755—214 in first class and 541 in tourist class—and a crew of 400.
