= MV Victoria =

A number of motor vessels have been named Victoria, including:

- MV Victoria (1931), an Italian ocean liner
- MV Victoria (1941), an Argentinian tanker damaged by German submarine U-201 on 17 April 1942
- MV Victoria (1952), an Italian ocean liner
- MV Victoria (1959), a Kenya ferry in service as of 2012
- MV Victoria, built in 1965 as Kungsholm and renamed Victoria in 1995
- MV Victoria (1979), a Jordanian cargo ship attacked by Somali pirates in 2008

== See also ==
- MS Victoria
