= Kenilworth (disambiguation) =

Kenilworth is a town in Warwickshire, England.

Kenilworth may also refer to:

== Places ==
=== Australia ===
- Kenilworth, Queensland, a town and locality in the Sunshine Coast Region

=== Canada ===
- Kenilworth, Edmonton, a neighbourhood
- Kenilworth, Ontario, a town in Wellington County

=== Ireland ===
- Kenilworth Square, a Victorian garden square in Dublin

=== South Africa ===
- Kenilworth, Cape Town
- Kenilworth, Gauteng

=== United States ===
- Kenilworth, Illinois
  - Kenilworth station (Illinois), a commuter railroad station
- Kenilworth, New Jersey
- Kenilworth, Pennsylvania
- Kenilworth Trail, a shared-use path in Minneapolis
- Kenilworth, Utah
- Kenilworth, Washington, D.C.

== Other uses ==
- Kenilworth ivy, a common name for cymbalaria muralis
- Kenilworth (novel), written in 1821 by Sir Walter Scott
- Kenilworth (play), 1821 theatrical adaptation of the novel
- Kenilworth (TV series), based on the Sir Walter Scott novel, that aired on BBC
- Kenilworth Castle, a structure around which Kenilworth (Warwickshire, England) was founded
  - RMS Kenilworth Castle, ships with the name
- Kenilworth Park Racetrack, a venue in Windsor, Ontario, Canada
- Kenilworth, Potts Point, a historic house in a suburb of Sydney, Australia
- Kenilworth Road, a stadium in Luton, England
- The Kenilworth, an apartment building in New York City, New York, United States

== See also ==
- The Masque at Kenilworth, a cantata by Henry Fothergill Chorley and Arthur Sullivan
- Killingworth, Connecticut, a town in the United States that is named after Kenilworth, Warwickshire, England
- Creston-Kenilworth, Portland, Oregon, a neighborhood in Portland, Oregon, United States
