= RMS Saxon =

Royal Mail Ship

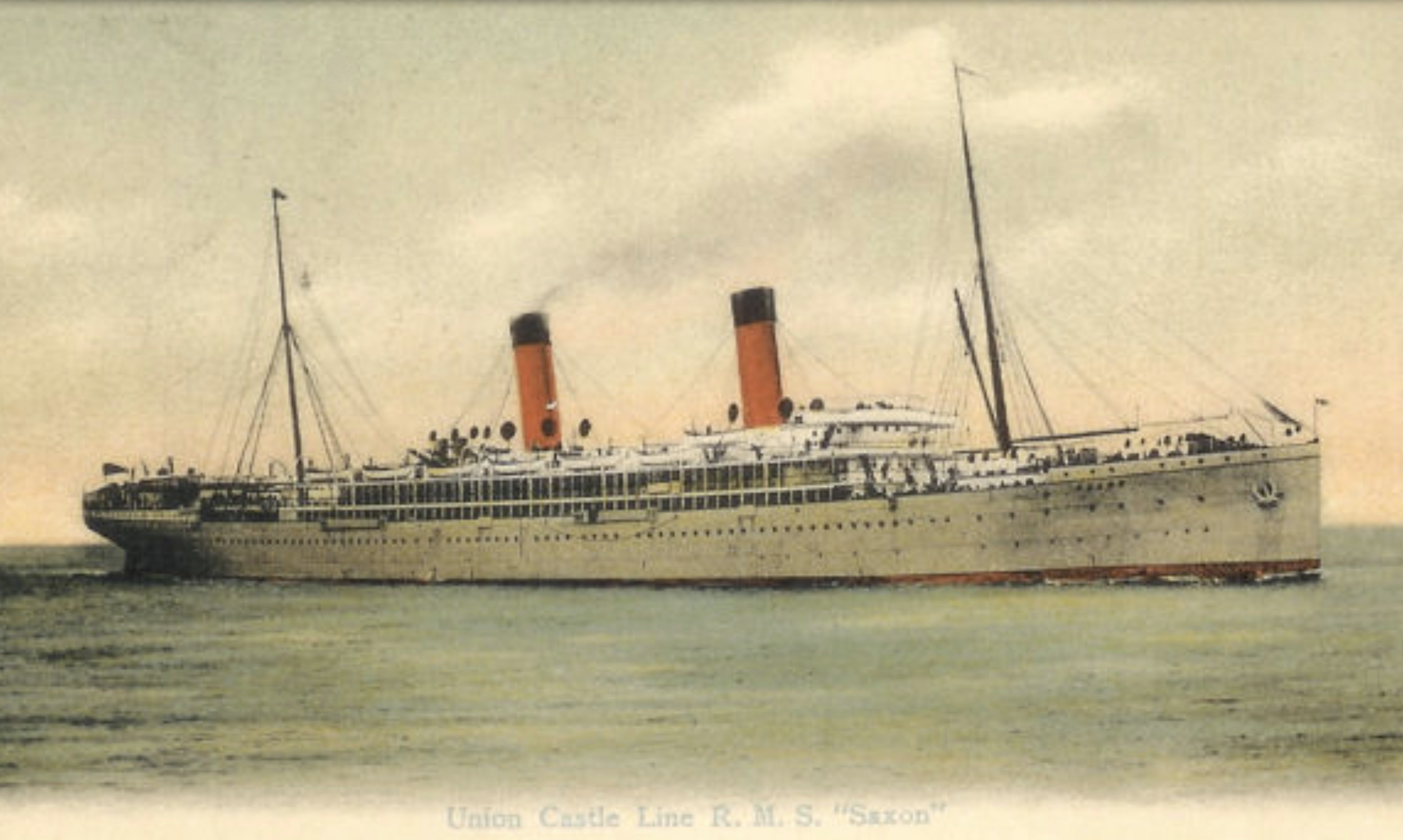
- RMS Saxon

History

United Kingdom
- Name: RMS Saxon
- Owner: Union-Castle Line
- Builder: Harland & Wolff, Belfast
- Launched: 21 December 1899
- Completed: 9 June 1900
- Out of service: 1931
- Fate: Scrapped 9 April 1935
- Notes: Requisitioned as a troop transport in 1917

General characteristics
- Tonnage: 12,385 GRT
- Length: 570 ft.
- Beam: 64 ft 4 in (19.61 m)
- Installed power: 1,396 nhp
- Propulsion: As built: Steel Screw Steamer; 2 Stroke Double Acting engine; 1 × Steam 2 cylinder (28, 39.75, 57.5, 82 x 60in), 1-Screw
- Speed: Cruising: 17.5 kn (32 km/h; 20 mph)
- Capacity: As built: 310 first class passengers; 203 second class passengers; 154 third class passengers

The RMS Saxon was a Royal Mail Ship that went into service with Castle Line (and its successor, the Union-Castle Line) in 1900, on the passenger and mail service run between Britain and South Africa. She was the 4th ship by this name, the first being a coal carrier dating back to the Crimean War. After the Boer War, the Saxon was one of nine ships that made up the Southampton-Cape Town Mail Run. In May 1901, the High Commissioner of South Africa, Lord Alfred Milner, travelled aboard the Saxon on his way back to Southampton, England. He travelled on the same route aboard the Saxon in 1925, shortly before his death.

During World War I, the Saxon was requisitioned by the government and served as a troopship in the Mediterranean and the North Atlantic, carrying American troops from New York to France. She made six voyages across the Atlantic from May 1918 to October 1918, then returned to service after the war. The Saxon suffered a serious fire in 1921 and had to be escorted to Freetown, Sierra Leone, where another ship picked up her passengers and mail.

The Saxon was retired in 1930, and replaced by the refrigerated ship Warwick Castle.
