= HMHS Braemar Castle =

Hospital ship of the Royal Navy

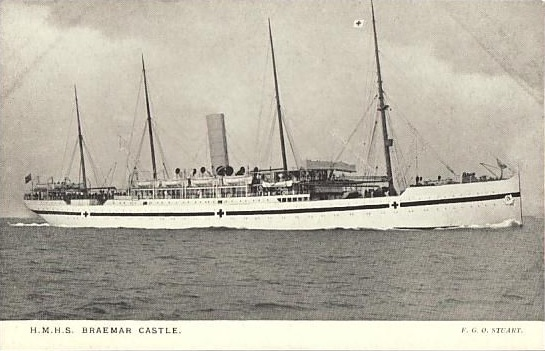
- His Majesty's Hospital Ship (HMHS) Braemar Castle

History

United Kingdom
- Name: HMHS Braemar Castle
- Owner: Union-Castle Line
- Operator: (United Kingdom of Great Britain and Ireland) Royal Navy
- Port of registry: (United Kingdom of Great Britain and Ireland) United Kingdom
- Builder: Barclay Curle
- Yard number: 409
- Launched: 23 February 1898
- Completed: 1898
- In service: 1915 (hospital ship)
- Out of service: 1924
- Fate: Sold for scrap, 1924

General characteristics
- Tonnage: 6266 GRT
- Capacity: 3309
- Crew: 673

SS Braemar Castle was a passenger-cargo steamship, built for Castle Line in 1898, that spent more of her time in British government service than working for her owners. She served both as a troopship and as a hospital ship, prefixed HMT and HMHS respectively, before, during and after the First World War.

She was built in 1898 and originally served as a passenger liner with the Union-Castle Line, sailing from Southampton to South Africa. At the start of the Second Boer War, and from 1909, she served as a troopship and was requisitioned for the British Expeditionary Force in 1914 and in Gallipoli in 1915. Later in 1915, she was converted to a hospital ship, hitting a mine (laid by SM U-73) in the Aegean Sea on 23 November 1916 and being repaired at La Spezia. She continued to serve as a hospital ship, sailing to Murmansk in 1918 and staying until 1920, the last non-Russian ship to leave Arkhangelsk. After a brief return to commercial service, Braemar Castle was again requisitioned as a troopship for the peace-keeping force during the Greco-Turkish War. She was sold for demolition in Italy in 1924.

== See also ==
- List of hospitals and hospital ships of the Royal Navy
- List of hospital ships sunk in World War I
