= SS Drakensberg Castle =

History
- Name: Empire Allenby (1944-46); Drakensberg Castle (1946-59)
- Owner: Ministry of War Transport (1944-46); Union Castle Mail Steamship Co Ltd (1946-59)
- Operator: Owner operated except:-; Prince Line Ltd (1944-46)
- Port of registry: (United Kingdom) Sunderland (1945-47); South Africa (1947-57); South Africa (1957-59)
- Builder: J L Thompson & Sons Ltd, Sunderland
- Yard number: 633
- Launched: 18 October 1944
- Completed: June 1945
- Out of service: 5 August 1959
- Identification: UK Official Number 180157 (1945-47); Code letters GJTM; (1945-47)
- Fate: Scrapped in Hong Kong September 1959

General characteristics
- Tonnage: 9,904 GRT
- Length: 475 ft 4 in (144.88 m)
- Beam: 64 ft 1 in (19.53 m)
- Depth: 40 ft (12.19 m)
- Propulsion: 2 x steam turbines double reduction geared driving one screw
- Speed: 14.5 knots (26.9 km/h)

The Empire Allenby was a 9,904 ton cargo liner which was built in 1944. She was renamed Drakensberg Castle in 1946, and scrapped in 1959.

== History ==
Empire Allenby was built by J L Thompson & Sons Ltd, Sunderland as yard number 633. She was launched on 18 October 1944 and completed in June 1945. Empire Allenby was built for the Ministry of War Transport and operated under the management of Furness, Withy & Co Ltd, who traded as Prince Line Ltd.

In 1946, Empire Allenby was sold to the Union Castle Mail Steamship Co Ltd, who traded as the Union-Castle Line. She was renamed Drakensberg Castle. On 22 July 1947, she was transferred to the South African registry. Although Drakensberg Castle was a fast ship compared to others in the Union-Castle Line fleet, she was expensive to operate and not suitable for use as a tramp. She was sold for scrap to the Hong Kong Salvage & Towage Co and arrived for scrapping in Hong Kong on 5 August 1959. Drakensberg Castle was scrapped in September 1959.

== Official Number and code letters ==
Official Numbers were a forerunner to IMO Numbers.

Empire Allenby had the UK Official Number 180157 and used the Code Letters GJTM.
