= RMS Walmer Castle =

Royal Mail Ship

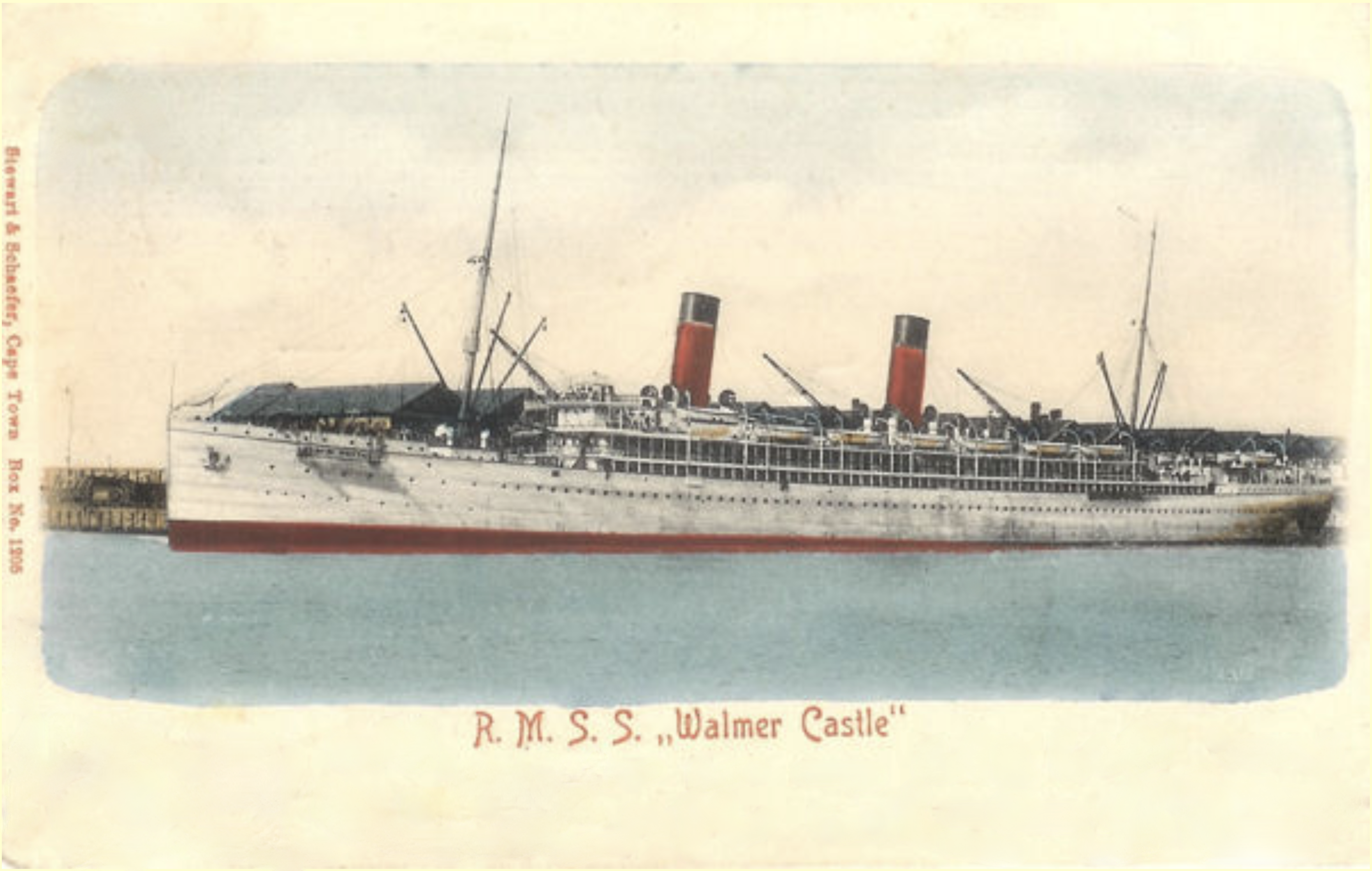
- RMS Walmer Castle

History

United Kingdom
- Name: Walmer Castle
- Owner: Union-Castle Line
- Builder: Harland & Wolff, Belfast
- Launched: 6 July 1901
- Completed: 20 February 1902
- Out of service: 1930
- Fate: Broken up at Blyth in 1932
- Notes: Southampton - Cape Town service

General characteristics
- Tonnage: 12,546 GRT
- Length: 570 ft 6 in (173.89 m)
- Beam: 64 ft 4 in (19.61 m)
- Installed power: 1,200 nhp
- Propulsion: As built: Steel screw; 2 × quadruple expansion engines; 2 × steam 4-cylinder (28, 39.75, 57.5, 82 x 60 in), 2 screws
- Speed: Cruising: 17.5 kn (32 km/h; 20 mph)
- Capacity: As built: unk. first class passengers; unk. second class passengers; unk. third class passengers

RMS Walmer Castle was a Royal Mail Ship of the Union-Castle Line in service between London, England and Cape Town, South Africa between 1902 and 1930. She was the second of three ships by this name. Her service was interrupted in 1917 when she was requisitioned by the government to serve as a troop transport, transporting troops from South Africa and later in the North Atlantic, painted in a camouflaged dazzle scheme. In 1919, she made two voyages between Liverpool and New York before returning to her mail run. Among her notable passengers were poet Rudyard Kipling and politician Lord Gladstone, the first Governor General of South Africa. Kipling travelled on the Union-Castle line twenty times. Lord Alfred Milner and his wife Violet travelled from England to South Africa aboard the Walmer Castle in 1924.

She was retired and replaced by the refrigerated ship Winchester Castle in 1930.
