= Union-Castle Line =

Former British shipping line

Union-Castle Mail SS Co. Ltd
- House flag

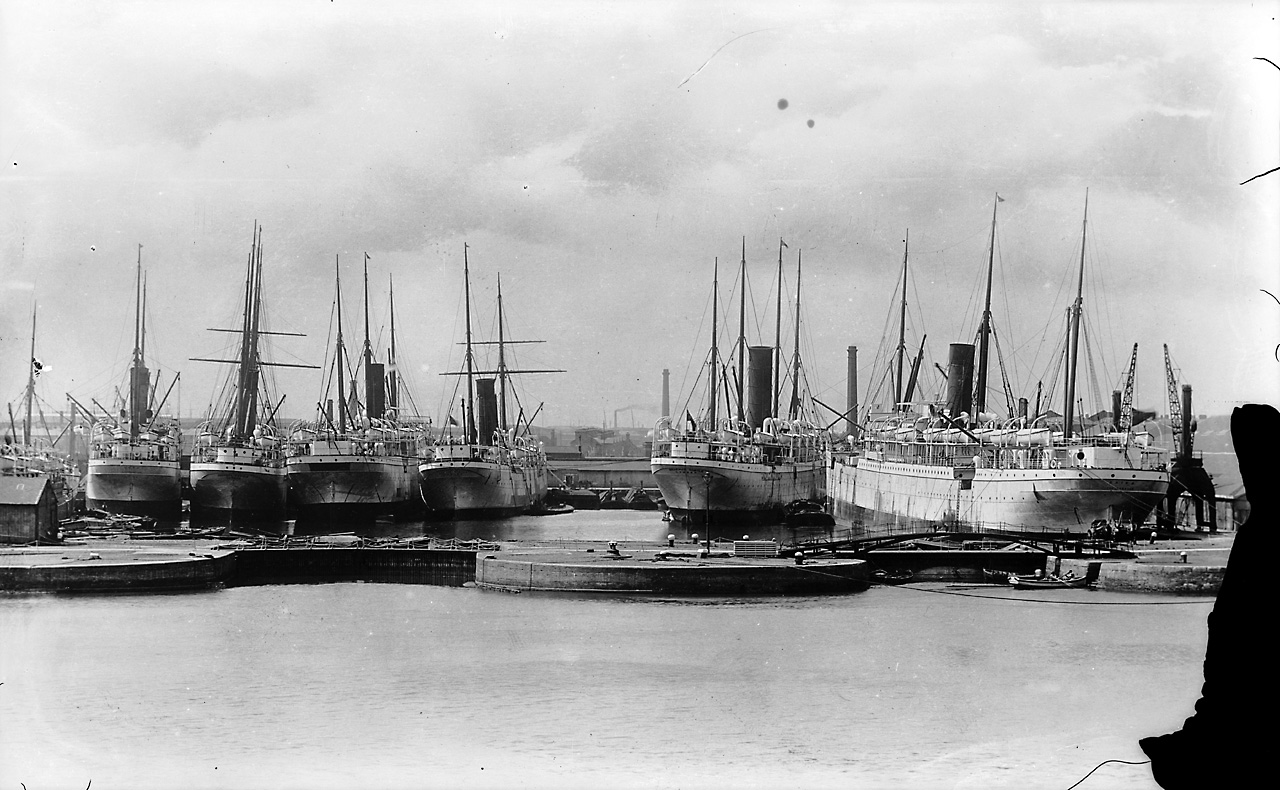
- Union-Castle liners in East India Docks, London in 1902
- Trade name: Union-Castle Line
- Industry: Shipping
- Predecessors: Union Line; Castle Mail Packet Co.
- Founded: 8 March 1900 in United Kingdom
- Defunct: 1990
- Successor: British and Commonwealth Shipping
- Headquarters: United Kingdom
- Area served: London and Southampton to Cape Town
- Key people: Donald Currie; Sir Francis Vernon Thompson
- Services: Passenger, cargo and mail transport

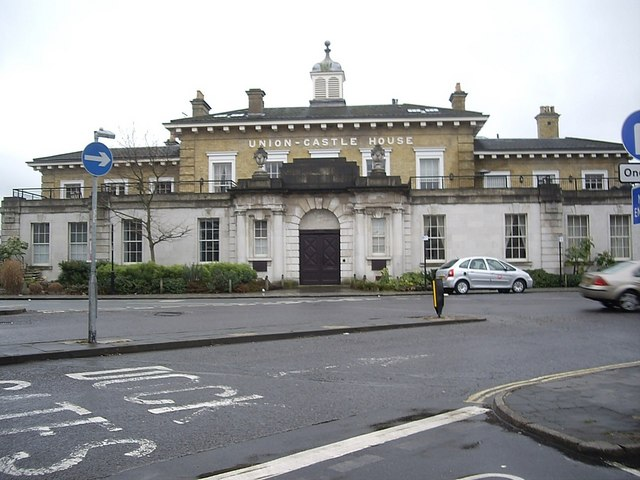
Union-Castle House, Southampton

The Union-Castle Line was a British shipping line that operated a fleet of passenger liners and cargo ships between Europe and Africa from 1900 to 1977. It was formed from the merger of the Union Line and Castle Shipping Line.

It merged with Bullard King and Clan Line in 1956 to form British & Commonwealth Shipping, and then with South African Marine Corporation (commonly referred to as Safmarine) in 1973 to create International Liner Services, but maintained its separate identity throughout. Its shipping operations ceased in 1977.

== Predecessor lines ==
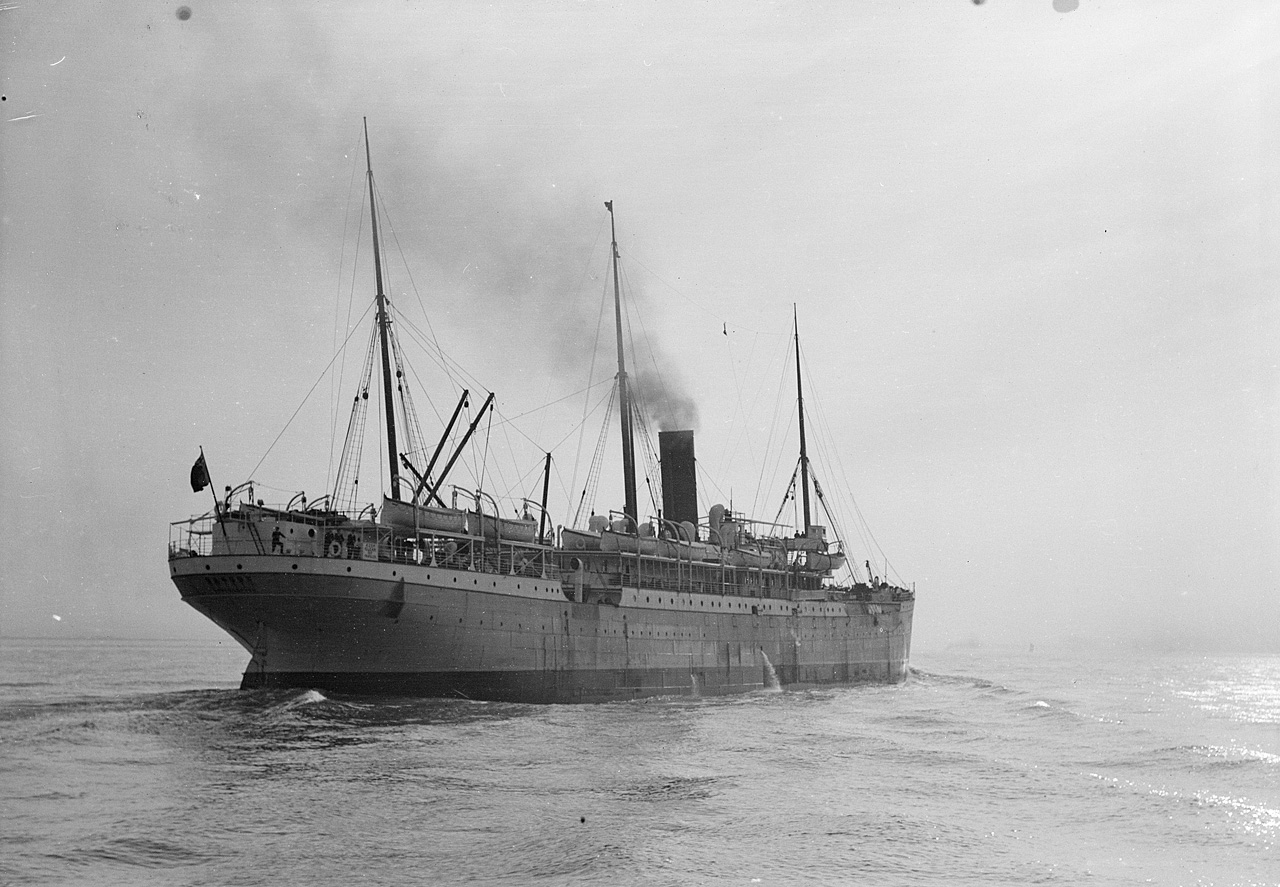
Gascon was built in 1897

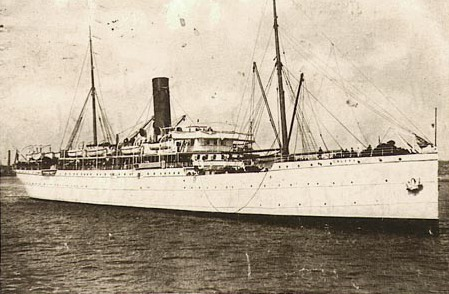
Galeka was built in 1899 and sunk by a mine in 1916.

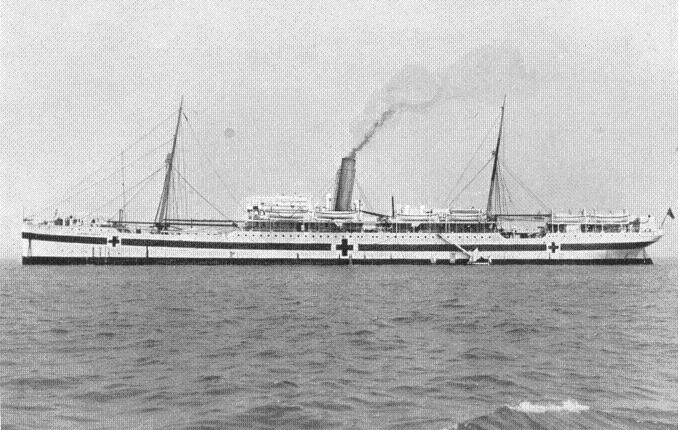
Glenart Castle as a First World War hospital ship. She was built in 1900 as Galician.

The Union Line was founded in 1853 as the Southampton Steam Shipping Company to transport coal from South Wales to Southampton. It was renamed the Union Steam Collier Company and then the Union Steamship Company. In 1857, renamed the Union Line, it won a contract to carry mail to South Africa, mainly the Cape Colony. The inaugural sailing of Dane left Southampton on 15 September.

Meanwhile, Donald Currie had built up the Castle Packet Co. which traded to Calcutta round the Cape of Good Hope. This trade was substantially curtailed by the opening of the Suez Canal in 1869, and the Castle Line started to run to South Africa instead, later becoming the Castle Mail Packet Company.

In 1872 the Cape Colony gained responsible government and its first Prime Minister, John Molteno, ordered a re-negotiation of the country's mail services. In 1876, keen to avoid either of the two main companies gaining a monopoly on the country's shipping, he awarded the South African mail contract jointly to both the Castle Mail Packet Company and the Union Line. The contract included a condition that the two companies would not amalgamate, as well as other clauses to promote competition, such as alternating services and speed premiums. This competition led to their shipping services running at unprecedented speed and efficiency. The contract was eventually to expire however, and the period of intense competition was later to give way to co-operation, including transporting troops and military equipment during the Boer War. Finally, on 8 March 1900, the Union Line and Castle Shipping Line merged, creating the Union-Castle Mail Steamship Company, Ltd, with Castle Shipping Line taking over the fleet.

== Union-Castle Line ==
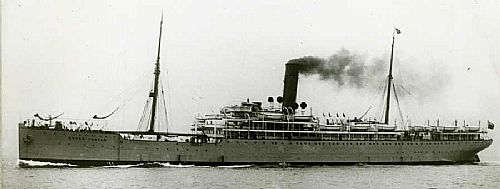
Dover Castle which was built in 1900, was a hospital ship in the First World War and was sunk by torpedo in 1917.

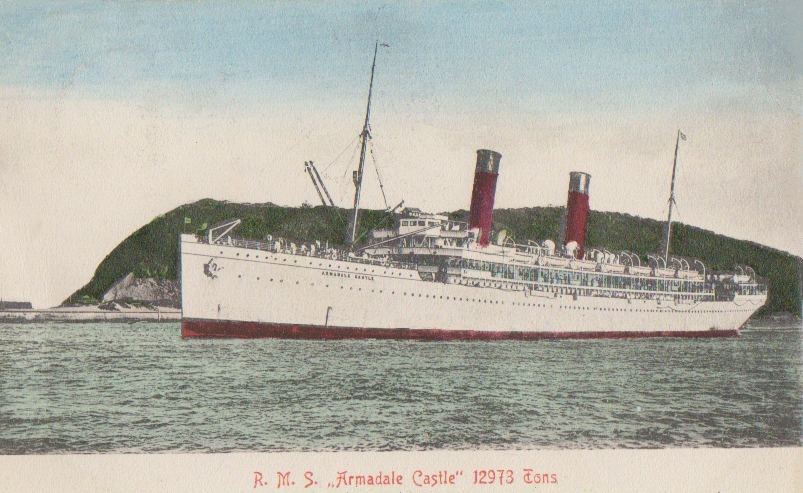
Armadale Castle was built in 1903 and was an armed merchant cruiser in the First World War.

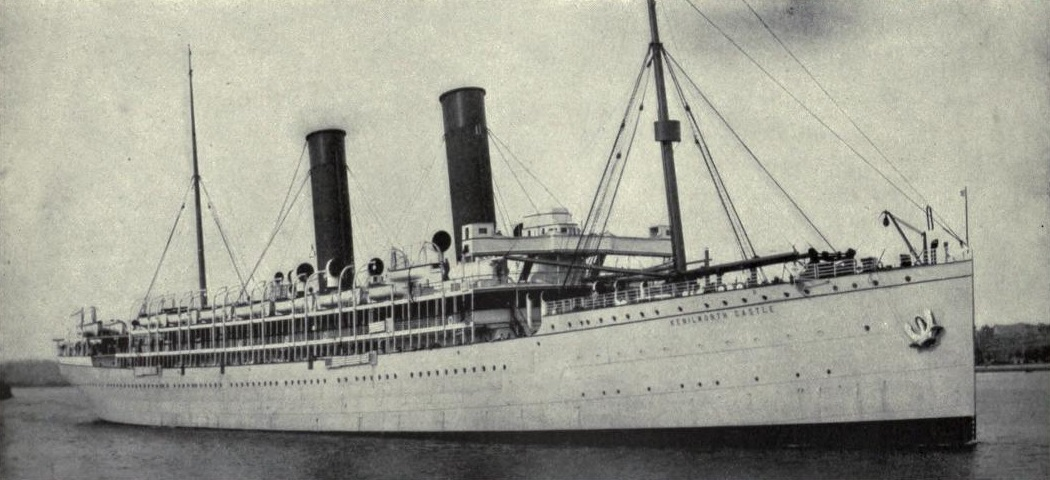
Kenilworth Castle was built in 1904, was a passenger ship liner.

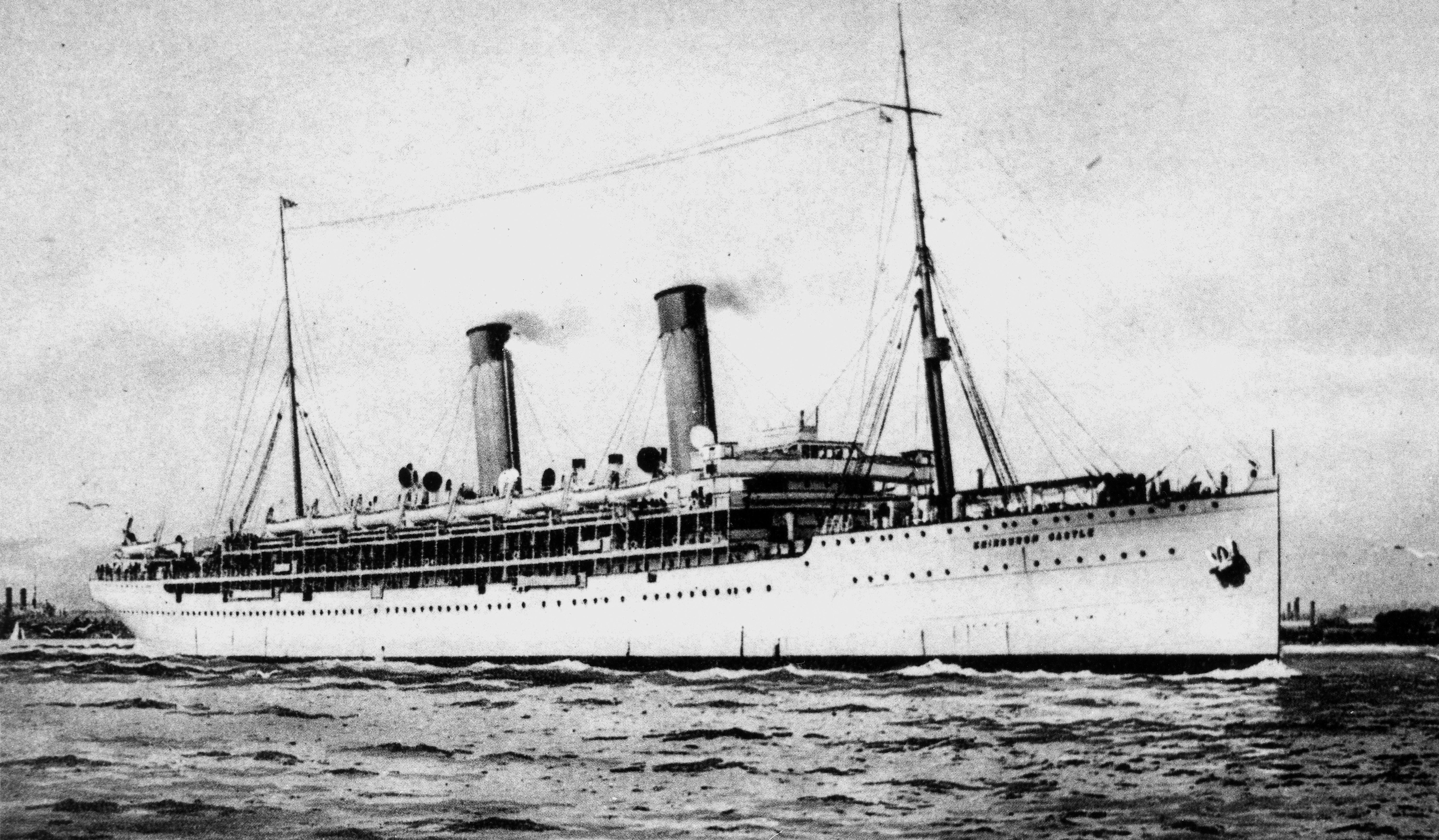
RMS Edinburgh Castle was built in 1910, was an armed merchant cruiser in the First World War and an accommodation ship in the Second World War.

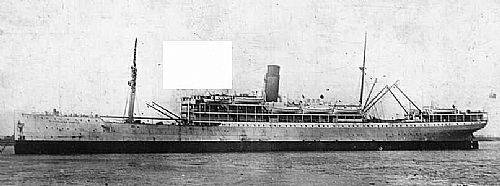
Gloucester Castle was built in 1911 and was a hospital ship in the First World War. Afterwards she returned to civilian service. She was sunk by torpedo in 1942.

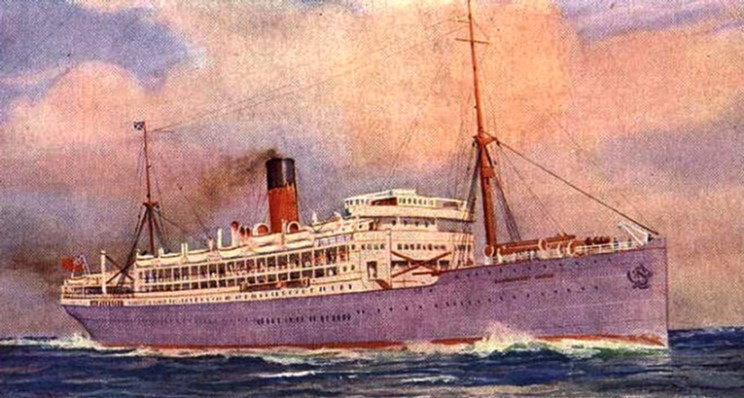
Llandovery Castle was built in 1914, was a hospital ship in the First World War and was sunk by torpedo in 1918.

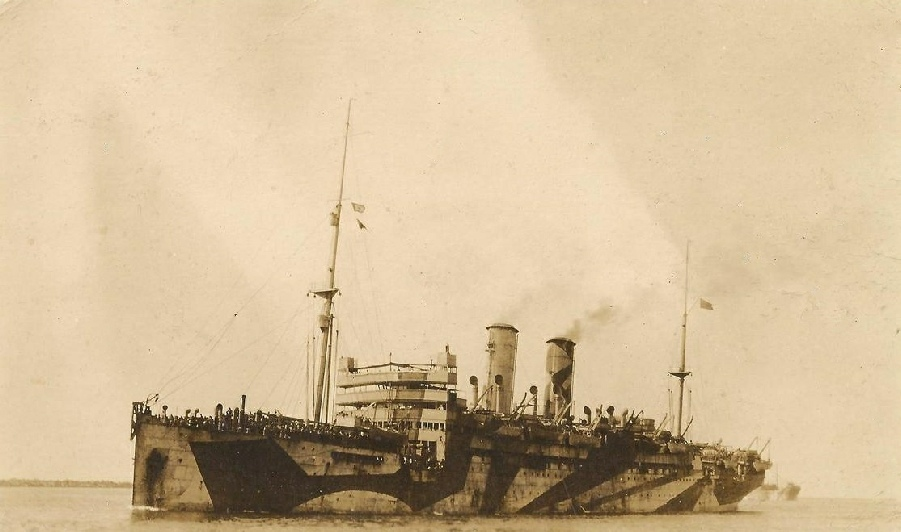
Passenger steam liner Leasowe Castle was built in 1915 and was a troopship in the First World War. She was sunk by torpedo in 1918.

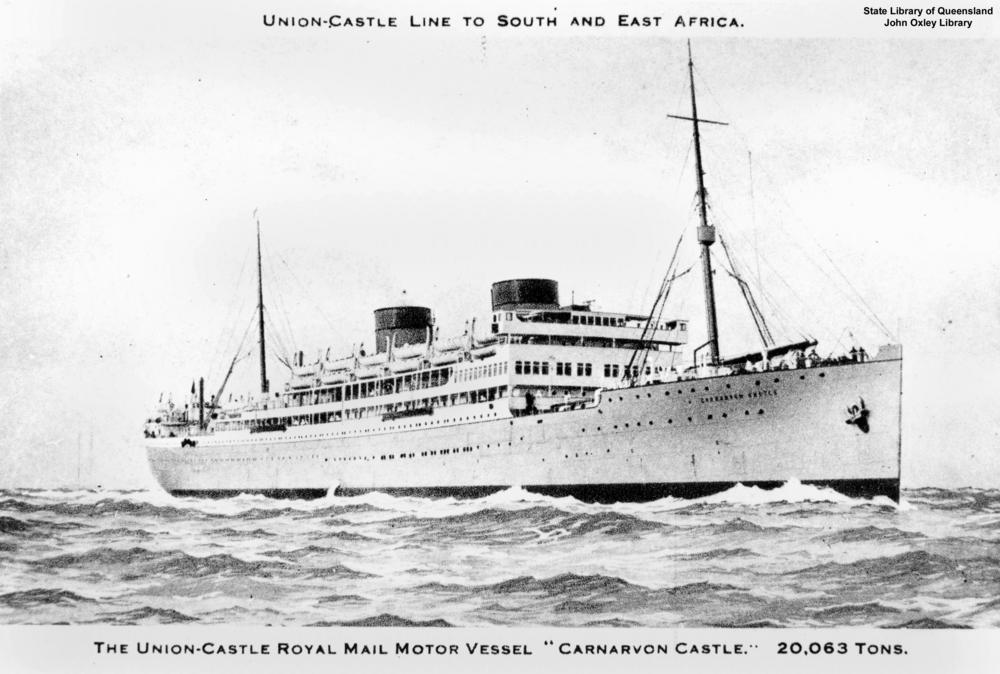
RMS Carnarvon Castle was built in 1926, was an armed merchant cruiser in the Second World War and fought the German auxiliary cruiser Thor in 1940.

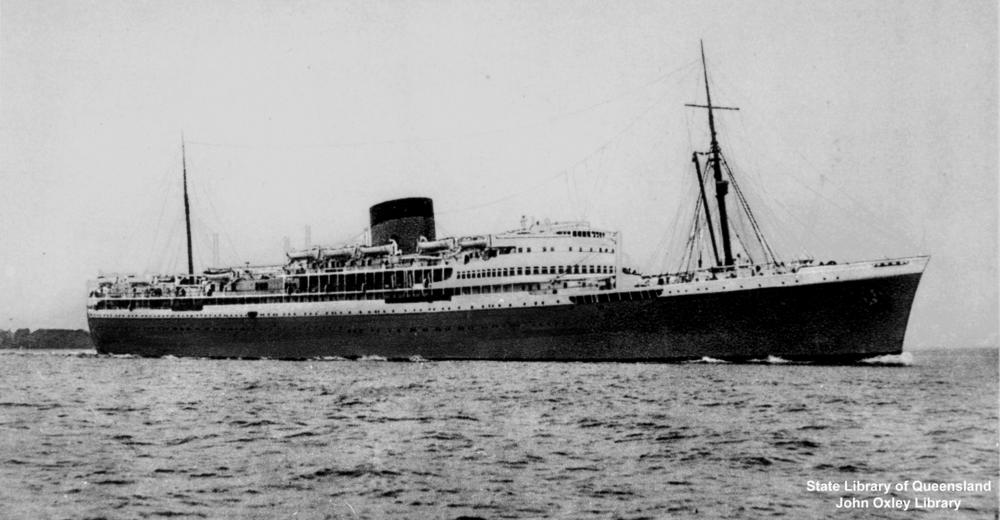
Athlone Castle was built in 1936 and was a troopship in the Second World War.

Union-Castle named most of their ships with the suffix "Castle" in their names; the names of several inherited from the Union Line were changed to this scheme (for example, Galician became Glenart Castle) but others (such as Galeka) retained their original name. They were well known for the lavender-hulled liners with red funnels topped in black, running on a rigid timetable between Southampton and Cape Town. Every Thursday at 4pm a Union-Castle Royal Mail Ship would leave Southampton bound for Cape Town. At the same time, a Union-Castle Royal Mail Ship would leave Cape Town bound for Southampton. In 1922 the line introduced its Round Africa service, a nine-week voyage calling at twenty ports en route. Alternate sailings travelled out via the Suez Canal and out via West Africa.

The combined line was sold to the Royal Mail Line in 1911, but continued to operate as Union-Castle. Many of the line's vessels were requisitioned for service as troop ships or hospital ships in the First World War, and eight were sunk by mines or German U-boats. The Royal Mail Line ran into financial difficulties in the 1930s, culminating in the prosecution of its director Lord Kylsant, and Union-Castle Line became an independent company again with Vernon Thomson as Managing Director. Many vessels were again requisitioned in the Second World War. Three – Dunnottar Castle, Carnarvon Castle, Dunvegan Castle became armed merchant cruisers. Pretoria Castle (1939) was also first requisitioned as an armed merchant cruiser, but later served as an escort carrier.

After the war the line made good use of its three ships converted to troop transports to facilitate carrying the vast number of emigrants seeking new lives in East and South Africa. When they ran out of berths the line set up its own internal travel agency to book passages on other lines and even air services. The mail service to South Africa, curtailed during hostilities, recommenced with the sailing of Roxburgh Castle from Southampton on 2 January 1947.

== British & Commonwealth, and International Liner Services ==
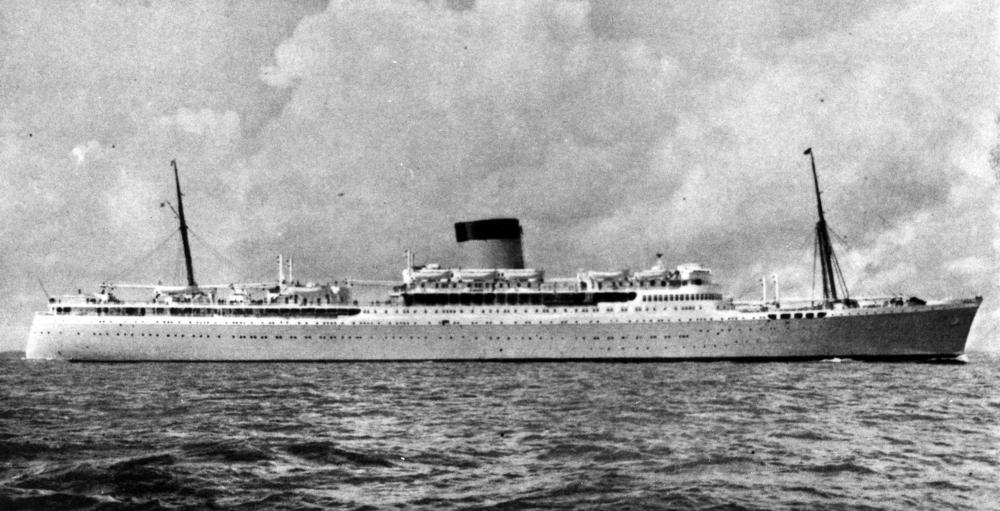
RMS Edinburgh Castle, built in 1947

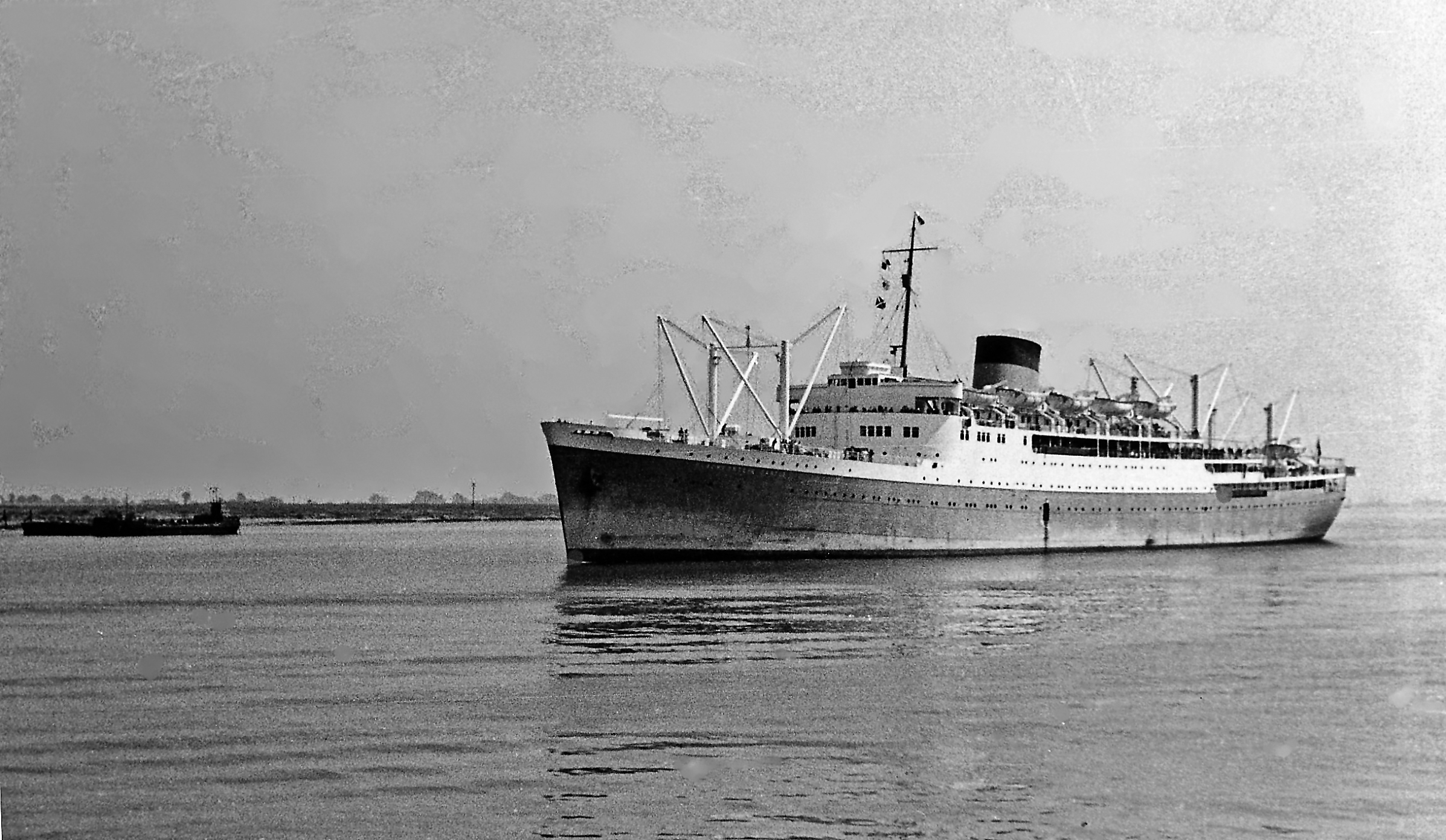
Bloemfontein Castle, built in 1950

The company took over the King Line in 1949, and merged with Bullard King and Clan Line in 1956 to form British & Commonwealth Shipping. It merged with South African Marine Corporation in 1973 to create International Liner Services, but competition with air travel adversely affected its shipping activities, and cargo shipping rapidly became containerised. The final South African mail service arrived in Southampton on 24 October 1977, and International Liner Services withdrew from shipping in 1982. British & Commonwealth continued in other fields, and acquired Atlantic Computers in 1989, but accounting problems soon became apparent and British & Commonwealth was liquidated in 1990.

In the 1950s and 60s the line operated a fleet of fifteen ships, eight on the principal weekly mail run from Southampton to Cape Town. Each ship could carry an average of two hundred First Class passengers and four hundred and fifty in Tourist Class. Six of the remaining ships operated the monthly Round Africa service, sailing both clockwise and anti-clockwise round the continent. The remaining ship operated a service carrying up to 750 Tourist Class passengers to Beira and back via the West Coast route every three months.

In December 1999 the Union-Castle name was revived for a millennium cruise; the P&O ship Victoria was chartered for a 60-day cruise around Africa, and had its funnel repainted for the occasion.

The last few surviving Union-Castle Line ships were scrapped in the early 21st century, the former Kenya Castle in 2001, the former Transvaal Castle in 2003, the former Dunnottar Castle in 2004, and finally Windsor Castle in 2005.

== Ships ==
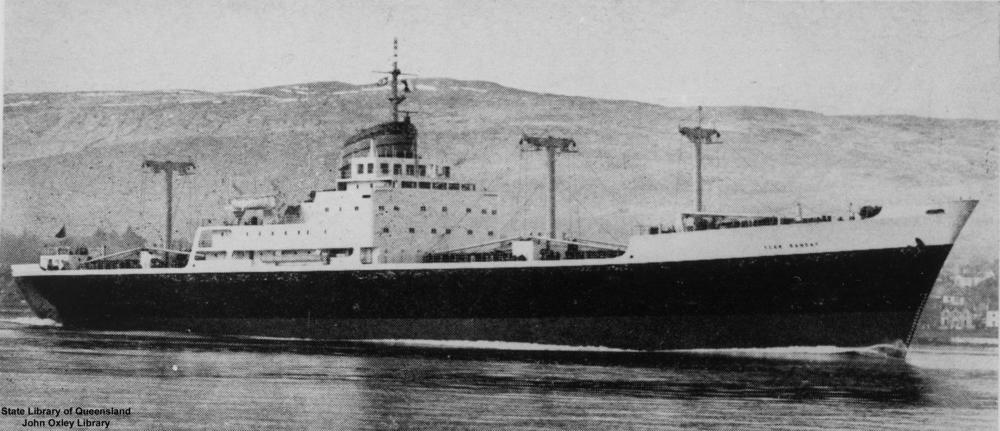
The cargo ship MV Winchester Castle, built in 1964 as Clan Line's Clan Ramsay

The initial Union fleet consisted of the colliers Union, Briton, Saxon, Norman and Dane. In 1860 this was augmented by the much larger Cambrian.

At the time of the merger in 1900, the Union fleet included:

Arab (1879–1900), Briton (1897–1926), Falcon (1896–1942), Gaika (1896–1926), Galeka (1899–1916), Galician (1900-1918), Gascon (1897–1928), Gaul (1893–1906), German (2) (1898–1930), Goorkka (1897-1926), Goth (1893–1913), Greek (1893–1906), Guelph (1894–1913), Mexican (1883–1900), Moor (1881-1901), Norman (2) (1894–1926), Sabine (1895–1921), Saxon (1900–1935), Scot (1891–1905), Spartan (1881–1900), Susquehanna (1896–1926), and Trojan (1880–1900), with Celt on order (renamed Walmer Castle before it came into service)

and the Castle Line fleet included:

Arundel Castle (3) (1894–1905), Avondale Castle (1897–1912), Braemar Castle (1) (1898–1924), Carisbrook Castle (1898–1922), Doune Castle (1890–1904), Dunolly Castle (1897–1905), Dunottar Castle (1890–1913), Dunvegan Castle (1896–1923), Garth Castle (1880–1901), Harlech Castle (1894–1904), Hawarden Castle (1883–1904), Kildonan Castle (1899–1931), Kinfauns Castle (2) (1899–1927), Lismore Castle (1891–1904), RMS Norham Castle (1883–1903), Pembroke Castle (2) (1883–1906), Raglan Castle (1897–1905), Roslin Castle (2) (1883–1904), Tantallon Castle (2) (1894–1901), Tintagel Castle (1) (1896–1912) (Note: It was on the Tintagel Castle in 1900 that Ernest Shackleton met Cedric, the son of Lieutenant-Colonel Llewellyn Longstaff, the principal financial backer of Scott’s Discovery Expedition, that meeting led to Shackleton obtaining a place on The Discovery Expedition of 1901–1904.)

Ship	Built	Tonnage	Notes and references
Alnwick Castle	1901	5,893	Passenger steamer Built by William Beardmore and Company, Glasgow; Torpedoed by U-81 on 21 March 1917
Armadale Castle	1903	12,973	1936 scrapped
Aros Castle	1901	4,460	Steamer Built by Barclay, Curle & Co., Ltd., Glasgow; Torpedoed by U-90 on 21 Nov 1917
Arundel Castle	1894	4,588	Passenger ship built by Fairfield Shipbuilding and Engineering Company, launched 1895, sold to the Danish East Asiatic Company in 1905 and renamed Birma
Arundel Castle	1921	19,023	Passenger ship built by Harland and Wolff, launched 11 September 1919, completed 8 April 1921, maiden voyage 22 April 1921, scrapped 1959
Athlone Castle	1936	25,564	Passenger ship built by Harland and Wolff, launched 28 November 1935, completed 13 May 1936, maiden voyage 22 May 1936, scrapped 1965
Balmoral Castle	1910	13,361	1939 scrapped
Balmoral Castle	1965	7,952	ex-Clan Robertson 1976 renamed Balmoral Castle; 1979 renamed Balmoral Universal; 1982 sold to Greece, renamed Psara Reefer.
Bampton Castle	1920	6,698	1932 sold to Greece, renamed Atlantis
Banbury Castle	1918	6,430	ex-Glenstrae 1920 purchased from Glen Line, renamed Banbury Castle; 1931 sold to Greece, renamed Rokos
Berwick Castle	1902	5,883	1919 burnt out at Mombasa, sold to Italy
Bloemfontein Castle	1950	18,400	1959 sold to Greece, renamed Patris
Braemar Castle	1898	6,318	Hospital ship Built by Barclay, Curle & Co., Ltd., Glasgow; Mined and damaged by U-73 in the Aegean Sea in 1916
Braemar Castle	1943	7,067	ex-Empire Duchess 1949 purchased from MoWT, renamed Braemar Castle; 1950 transferred to King Line, renamed King James; 1958 sold to Hong Kong, renamed Tyne Breeze
Braemar Castle	1952	17,029	1966 scrapped
Bratton Castle	1920	6,696	1931 sold to Greece, renamed Proteus
Capetown Castle	1938	27,000	1967 scrapped
Carlisle Castle	1913	4,325	Steamer Built by Northumberland SB. Co., Ltd., Newcastle upon Tyne ex-Holtye; 1915 purchased from F.S. Holland & Co., London, renamed Carlisle Castle; Torpedoed by UB-57 near Royal Sovereign Light Vessel on 14 Feb 1918
Carlow Castle	1917	5,833	1930 sold to Mitchell, Cotts & Co., renamed Cape St. Columba
Carnarvon Castle	1926	20,122	Passenger ship built by Harland and Wolff, launched 14 January 1926, completed 26 June 1926, maiden voyage 16 July 1926, scrapped 1963
Cawdor Castle	1902	6,235	1926 went ashore South West Africa and declared a total loss
Chepstow Castle	1913	7,494	ex-Anglo-Brazilian 1915 purchased from Nitrate Producers Ltd., renamed Chepstow Castle; 1933 scrapped
Cluny Castle	1903	5,147	1924 transferred to Bullard King, renamed Umkuzi
Comrie Castle	1903	5,173	Passenger steamer Built by Barclay, Curle & Co., Ltd., Glasgow; Torpedoed and damaged by UC-71 5 nautical miles (9.3 km) S of St.Catherine's Point on 14 Mar 1918; 1924 transferred to Bullard King, renamed Umvoti
Corfe Castle	1901	4,592	1927 sold to W. Schuchmann, Hamburg, renamed Ostee
Crawford Castle	1910	4,264	ex-Hova 1917 purchased from F.S. Holland, London, renamed Crawford Castle; 1930 sold to W. Kunstmann, Stettin, renamed Victoria W. Kunstmann
Dover Castle	1904	8,271	Hospital ship Built by Barclay, Curle & Co., Ltd., Glasgow; Torpedoed and sunk by UC-67 50 nautical miles (93 km) N of Bona, Algeria on 26 May 1917
Dover Castle	1964	7,950	ex-Clan Ranald 1976 renamed Dover Castle; 1979 renamed Dover Universal; 1981 sold to Greece, renamed Golden Sea
Drakensberg Castle	1945	9,905	ex-Empire Allenby 1946 purchased from MoWT, renamed Drakensberg Castle; 1959 scrapped
Dromore Castle	1919	5,242	Cargo ship Built by Harland & Wolff at Greenock; Launched as War Poplar, completed as Dromore Castle; She hit a mine and sank whilst in a convoy 20 nautical miles (37 km) SE of the River Humber, without any loss of life, on 12 Dec 1941
Dunbar Castle	1883	2,837	Steamship Laid down as Doune Castle and upon purchase named Dunbar Castle; 1895 Sold to Fairfield Ship Building and Engineering Co. and renamed Olympia; 10 December 1910 – ran aground on Bligh Reef off Alaska's Prince William Sound and sank without loss of life
Dunbar Castle	1930	10,002	Passenger ship built by Harland and Wolff, completed 20 May 1930, struck a mine off North Foreland, Kent and sank on 9 January 1940
Dundrum Castle	1919	5,259	Cargo ship built by Harland and Wolff, completed 31 December 1919, caught fire and sank in Red Sea 2 April 1943
Dunluce Castle	1904	8,114	Passenger ship built by Harland and Wolff, completed 15 September 1904, sold for scrapping in 1939 but purchased by the Admiralty for use as accommodation ship
Dunottar Castle	1890	5,625	Passenger ship Built by Fairfield Shipbuilding and Engineering Co, Goven, Scotland Dec 1899 requisitioned as a troop transport for the Second Boer War; 1913 sold to the Royal Mail Steam Packet Company as Caribbean
Dunnottar Castle	1936	15,002	Passenger ship built by Harland and Wolff, launched 25 January 1936, completed 27 June 1936, maiden voyage 10 July 1936, rebuilt and renamed Victoria 1958, renamed The Victoria 1976 and Princesa Victoria 1993, scrapped 2004
Dunvegan Castle	1936	15,007	Passenger ship built by Harland and Wolff, launched 26 March 1936, completed 27 August 1936, requisitioned by Admiralty in 1940 as an armed merchant cruiser and renamed HMS Dunvegan Castle, torpedoed and sunk off Ireland by U-46 on 27 August 1940
Durban Castle	1938	17,382	1962 scrapped. In 1947 it was the crime scene of the Porthole Murder Case
Durham Castle	1904	8,217	Passenger/cargo Built by Fairfield Shipbuilding & Engineering, Govan; 1939 requisitioned by the Admiralty as an accommodation ship Struck a mine off Cromarty on 20 Jan 1940 and sank
Edinburgh Castle	1910	13,326	Passenger ship built by Harland and Wolff, launched 27 January 1910, completed 28 April 1910, maiden voyage May 1910. Fitted with 6-inch guns and operated as armed merchant cruiser during First World War. Requisitioned in Second World War and moored in Freetown as accommodation ship. Judged not worth returning to UK and sunk as a target by gunfire November 1945.
Edinburgh Castle	1947	28,700	1976 scrapped
Edinburgh Universal	1979	9,996	ex-Polar Honduras (Hamburg-Sud); 1981 leased from Barclays Mercantile Finance Co renamed Edinburgh Universal 1984 transferred to Hong Kong renamed Caspian Universal
Eider	1900	1,236	1926 purchased from Royal Mail SP Co., for the Southampton – Bremen – Hamburg feeder service 1936 sold to J. Billmeir, renamed Stanhill
Galway Castle	1911	7,988	Passenger ship built by Harland & Wolff, torpedoed by U-82 160 nautical miles (300 km) SW of Fastnet Rock, Ireland on 12 September 1918. Taken under tow but sank on 15 September.
Garth Castle	1910	7,612	Launched 13 January 1910. 1939 scrapped
Glenart Castle	1900	6,807	Formerly Union Line Galician Hospital ship Built by Harland & Wolff, Ltd., Belfast; 1 Mar 1917 – Mined and damaged by UC-65; 26 Feb 1918 – Torpedoed and sunk by UC-56 10 nautical miles (19 km) W of Lundy
Glengorm Castle	1898	6,763	Formerly Union Line German
Gloucester Castle	1911	7,999	Hospital ship Built by Fairfield SB. & Eng. Co., Ltd., Glasgow 31 Mar 1917 – Damaged by UB-32 near the Isle of Wight. 15 Jul 1942 – Sunk by German raider Michel off South West Africa. Captain H.H. Rose and 92 passengers and crew were killed. Two lifeboats containing 61 people were picked up by the raider and taken to Japan as prisoners
Good Hope Castle	1945	9,905	ex-Empire Life 1946 purchased from MoWT, renamed Good Hope Castle; 1959 scrapped
Good Hope Castle	1965	10,500	1978 sold to Italy, renamed Franca C
Gordon Castle	1901	4,408	1924 scrapped
Grantully Castle	1909	7,612	Launched 14 October 1909. 1939 scrapped
Guildford Castle	1911	7,995	1 June 1933 beached after collision in Elbe with Blue Funnel Line's Stentor. Total loss
Hansa	1904	880	1907 transferred from Liverpool-Hamburg Line 1937 sold to J. Billmeir, renamed Stanray
Helius	1888	4,579	ex-Dresden, (North German Lloyd) 1903 purchased by Houston Line, renamed Helius; 1904 purchased by Union-Castle; 1906 sold to Turkey, renamed Tirimujghian
Incomati	1920	340	1924 purchased from Portuguese Government, East Africa feeder service 1928 sold to Portugal
Iolaire	1902	999	Sir Donald Currie's yacht, used as officer cadet training ship 1914–1918 HMS Iolaire anti-submarine patrol ship 1939 became HMS Persephone; 1948 scrapped
Kenilworth Castle	1904	12,975	Passenger ship built by Harland and Wolff, launched 15 December 1903, completed 19 May 1904, scrapped 1936
Kenilworth Castle	1944	9,916	ex-Empire Wilson 1946 purchased from MoWT, renamed Kenilworth Castle; 1968 scrapped
Kenya Castle	1951	17,040	1967 sold to Greece, renamed Amerikanis
Kinnaird Castle	1956	7,718	ex-Clan Ross ex-South African Scientist, renamed Kinnaird Castle; 1962 reverted to Clan Line; 1969 transferred to King Line; 1975 sold to Panama, renamed Nazeer
Kinpurnie Castle	1954	8,121	ex-Clan Stewart, ex-South African Sculptor 1961 transferred from Safmarine renamed Kinpurnie Castle; 1967 sold to Panama, renamed Hellenic Med
Kinpurnie Castle	1966	7,950	ex-Clan Ross 1976 transferred from Houston Line, renamed Kinpurnie Castle; 1979 renamed Kinpurnie Universal; 1982 sold to Greece, renamed Syros Reefer
Leasowe Castle	1917	8,106	Passenger steamer Built by Cammell, Laird & Co., Ltd., Birkenhead; 20 Apr 1917 – Torpedoed and damaged by U-35 90 nautical miles (170 km) WxN of Gibraltar; 27 May 1918 – Torpedoed and sunk by UB-51 104 nautical miles (193 km) W of Alexandria
Llandaff Castle	1926	10,786	Passenger liner/troop transport Built by Workman, Clark & Co Ltd, Belfast; She took part in Operation Ironclad; Torpedoed and sunk by U-177 on 30 Nov 1942 off South Africa
Llandovery Castle	1914	11,423	Hospital ship Built by Barclay, Curle & Co., Ltd., Glasgow; 27 Jun 1918 – Torpedoed and sunk by SM U-86 116 nautical miles (215 km) W of Fastnet Rock, Ireland
Llandovery Castle	1925	10,640	1953 scrapped
Llangibby Castle	1929	11,951	Passenger ship built by Harland and Wolff (Govan), launched 4 July 1929, completed 21 November 1929, maiden voyage 5 December 1929, damaged during an air raid while docked in Liverpool on the night of on 21–22 December 1940, torpedoed and damaged by the U-402 16 January 1942. Converted to Landing Ship, Infantry and used in invasion of Normandy. Scrapped 1954.
Llanstephan Castle	1914	11,348	operated as troop transport. Converted to Landing Ship, Infantry. Scrapped 1952.
Lochgair	1888	111	1901 acquired as tender at Port Elizabeth 1905 sold to J.G. Stewart, Glasgow, renamed Loch Gair
Newark Castle	1902	6,224	Passenger/cargo steamer 12 Mar 1908 ran ashore 4 nautical miles (7.4 km) from the coast, in Richard's Bay near the Umhlatuzi River, South Africa
Pendennis Castle	1958	28,582	1976 sold to Philippines (Panama flag), renamed Ocean Queen April 1980 scrapped
Polglass Castle	1903	4,631	ex-Reichenfels, (Hansa Line) 1914 captured by Britain; 1916 managed by Union-Castle renamed Polglass Castle; 1921 sold to Hansa Line, renamed Reichenfels
Pretoria Castle; Warwick Castle	1939	17,383	Requisitioned in October 1939, fitted with 6-inch guns and operated as armed merchant cruiser by RN. 1942 sold to Admiralty and rebuilt as an escort carrier 1946 re-purchased by Union-Castle, renamed Warwick Castle; 1962 scrapped
Pretoria Castle	1948	28,705	1966 transferred to South African Marine Corp., renamed S.A.Oranje 1975 scrapped.
Reina del Mar	1956	20,263	Purchased from ex-Pacific Steam Nav. Co, 1964–1973 chartered by Union-Castle for cruising 1973 purchased by Union-Castle; 1975 scrapped
Rhodesia Castle	1951	17,041	1967 scrapped
Richmond Castle	1938	7,798	Cargo ship Built by Harland & Wolff Ltd, Belfast; Torpedoed and sunk by U-176 in mid-Atlantic
Richmond Castle	1944	7,971	1971 scrapped
Riebeeck Castle	1946	8,322	1971 scrapped
Ripley Castle	1917	7,521	ex-War Soldier 1919 purchased from shipping controller, renamed Ripley Castle; 1931 scrapped
Rochester Castle	1937	7,795	1970 sold to Cyprus, renamed Glenda and scrapped
Roslin Castle	1935	7,016	Refrigerated cargo ship built by Harland and Wolff, completed 4 May 1935, scrapped 1967
Rosyth Castle	1918	4,328	ex-War Earl 1919 purchased from shipping controller, renamed Rosyth Castle; 1920 transferred to Bullard King & Co., renamed Umlazi
Rotherwick Castle	1959	9,650	1975 sold to Liberia, renamed Sea Fortune
Rothesay Castle	1935	7,016	Refrigerated cargo ship built by Harland and Wolff, completed 11 May 1935, went ashore on Scottish Island of Islay, total loss 5 January 1940
Rothesay Castle	1960	9,650	1975 sold to Uruguay, renamed Laura
Rowallan Castle	1939	7,798	1942 bombed by German aircraft and sunk in Mediterranean
Rowallan Castle	1943	7,950	1971 scrapped
Roxburgh Castle	1937	7,801	Cargo ship Built by Harland & Wolff, Belfast; Torpedoed and sunk by U-107 in mid-Atlantic on 22 Feb 1943
Roxburgh Castle	1944	8,003	1971 scrapped
Rustenberg Castle	1946	8,322	1971 scrapped
Sandgate Castle	1922	7,607	1937 caught fire and sank NE of Bermuda
Sandown Castle	1921	7,607	1950 scrapped
Southampton Castle	1965	10,538	1978 sold to Italy, renamed Paola C
Stirling Castle	1936	25,554	Passenger ship built by Harland and Wolff, launched 15 August 1935, completed 29 January 1936, maiden voyage 7 February 1936, scrapped 1966
Stirling Universal	1979	9,065	ex-Hilco Speedster (Larsen. Oslo) 1981 leased from Lombard Facilities Ltd, London renamed Stirling Universal; 1984 transferred to Hong Kong renamed Speedster Universal
Tantallon Castle	1953	7,448	1971 sold to Cyprus, renamed Aris II
Tintagel Castle	1954	7,447	1971 sold to Cyprus, renamed Armar
Transvaal Castle	1961	32,697	Ocean liner Built by John Brown & Company, Clydebank, Scotland Sold to Safmarine in 1966 and renamed SA Vaal; Scrapped in 2003
Ulundi	1927	97	Sold to SA Railways and Harbors in 1935, museum ship in Durban
Walmer Castle	1936	906	1941 Southampton – Bremen – Hamburg feeder service 21 Sep 1941 bombed and sunk in the Atlantic while convoy rescue ship
Warwick Castle	1930	20,445	Passenger ship/troop transport built by Harland & Wolff, launched 29 April 1930, completed 16 January 1931, maiden voyage 30 January 1931, torpedoed and sunk by U-413 in mid-Atlantic on 14 November 1942
Winchester Castle	1930	20,109	Passenger ship built by Harland and Wolff, launched 19 November 1929, completed 11 October 1930, maiden voyage 24 October 1930, scrapped 1960
Winchester Castle	1964	7,950	ex-Clan Ramsey 1977 renamed Winchester Castle; 1979 renamed Winchester Universal; 1980 sold to Greece, renamed Lady Madonna
Windsor Castle	1921	18,967	Ocean liner Built by John Brown & Company, Clydebank, Scotland; Torpedoed by enemy aircraft and sunk on 23 Mar 1943 off Algiers
Windsor Castle	1960	37,640	1977 sold to Yiannis Latsis, Piraeus, renamed Margarita L (Panama flag). Scrapped at Alang, India, from August 2005
York Castle	1901	5,517	1924 sold to Italy, renamed San Terenzo

== Sources and further reading ==
- Damant, Henry (1977). Every Thursday at Four O'Clock. Weaving International Friendship Foundation.
- Gardiner, Robert (1980). Conway's All the World's Fighting Ships 1922–1946. Conway Maritime Press.
- Harris, CJ; Ingpen, Brian D (1994). Mailships of the Union-Castle Line. Vlaeberg: Fernwood Press. ISBN 1874950059.
- Molteno, PA (1900). The life and times of Sir John Charles Molteno, KCMG, First Premier of Cape Colony, Comprising a History of Representative Institutions and Responsible Government at the Cape. Vol. II. London: Smith, Elder & Co. p. 120. ISBN 1-146-67157-1.
- Murray, Marischal (1953). Union-Castle Chronicle 1853–1953. London: Longmans, Green and Co.
- Roussel, Mike; Warwick, Sam (2015). The Union-Castle Line: Sailing Like Clockwork. Stroud: The History Press. ISBN 978-0750962919.
