= SS Leasowe Castle =

British troopship sunk by German submarine in World War I

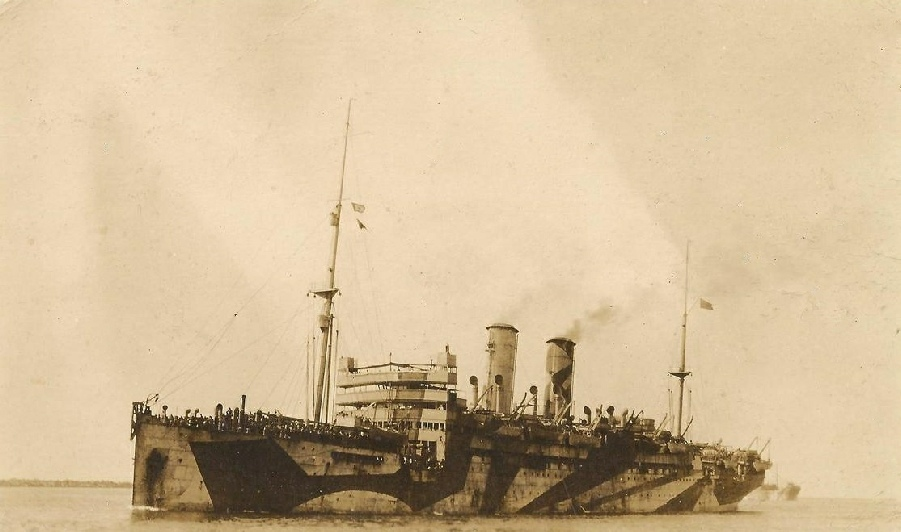
- Leasowe Castle as a troopship during World War I

History

United Kingdom
- Name: Leasowe Castle
- Operator: Union-Castle Line
- Builder: Cammell Laird, Birkenhead
- Laid down: 16 March 1915
- Launched: 5 April 1917
- Out of service: 27 May 1918
- Fate: Sunk, 27 May 1918

General characteristics
- Type: Steamliner
- Tonnage: 9,737 GRT
- Length: 488 ft (149 m)
- Beam: 58 ft (18 m)
- Draught: 27.5 ft (8.4 m)
- Installed power: 1,759 nhp
- Propulsion: 2 × quadruple expansion engines; 2 screws
- Speed: 17 knots (31 km/h; 20 mph)
- Capacity: 3,000

The British passenger steam liner SS Leasowe Castle was built between 1915 and 1917 at Cammell Laird shipyards in Birkenhead.

The ship was originally to be called Vasilissa Sophia and destined for the National Steam Navigation Company of Greece. During construction though, the ship was commandeered by the British Government through the Liner Acquisition Scheme, to be run by the Union-Castle Line. She was launched on 5 April 1917 and named Leasowe Castle (a 16th-century castle on the Wirral Peninsula in North West England).

Leasowe Castle was used as a troopship in World War I.

On 20 April 1917 the ship was torpedoed and damaged by German submarine SM U-35, 90 nautical miles (170 km; 100 mi) north west of Gibraltar. The wake of a torpedo was spotted by the crew approaching from the port side and the ship managed to turn to limit the damage. The torpedo hit the stern and destroyed the rudder. A second torpedo was fired and narrowly missed. The ship managed to reach Gibraltar under her own power for repairs.

Soon after midnight on 27 May 1918 the ship was struck by a torpedo from German submarine SM UB-51 in the Mediterranean Sea, 104 nautical miles (193 km; 120 mi) north west of Alexandria, Egypt (31°30′N 27°56′E). The ship was carrying 2,900 troops en route from Alexandria to Marseille in France. After about 90 minutes Leasowe had sunk with the loss of 101 lives. Many men spent hours in the water. Survivors were returned to Egypt. One of the survivors of the sinking was hockey player Frank Fredrickson. Captain Edward John Holl went down with the ship after urging his officers to save the crew: "Do your utmost; they must be saved".

The troops who died at sea in the Mediterranean in the First World War (without a grave on land) are commemorated by the Chatby Memorial, in the cemetery at Chatby in Alexandria.
