= MS Victoria =

MS Victoria may refer to the following ships:

- MS Dunnottar Castle, an ocean liner / cruise ship launched in 1936 and later called MS Victoria
- MV Kungsholm (1965), an ocean liner / cruise ship previously called MS Victoria
- MV Victoria (1959), a ferry formerly the Royal Mail Ship RMS Victoria
- MS Victoria I, a cruiseferry built in 2004

== See also ==
- MV Victoria
- SS Deutschland (1900), called SS Viktoria Luise for part of her history
