= RMS Kenilworth Castle =

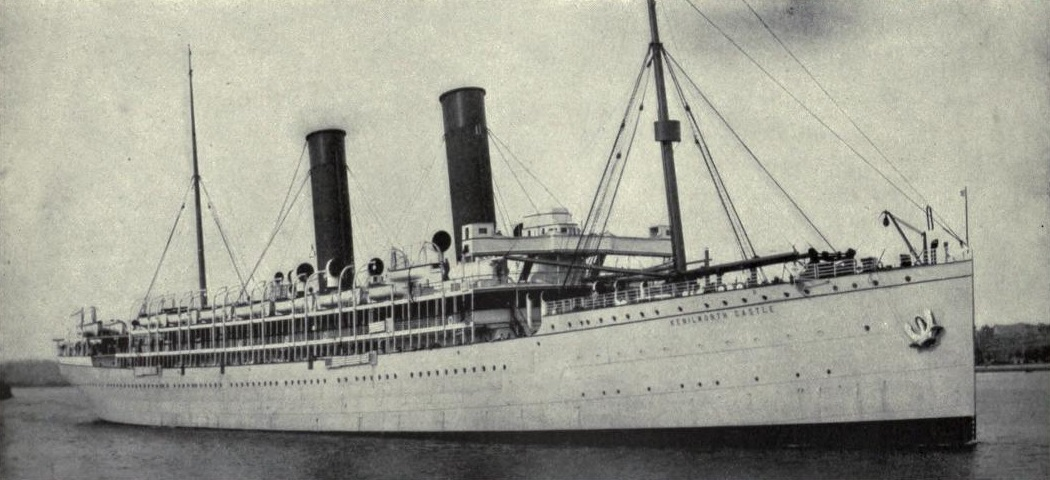
- RMS Kenilworth Castle in 1911.

History
- Name: Kenilworth Castle
- Namesake: Kenilworth Castle
- Owner: Union-Castle Line
- Port of registry: London, United Kingdom
- Builder: Harland & Wolff
- Yard number: 356
- Launched: 15 December 1903
- Completed: 19 May 1904
- Acquired: 19 May 1904
- In service: 19 May 1904
- Out of service: May 1936
- Identification: Official number: 118433
- Fate: Scrapped in 1937

General characteristics
- Type: Passenger ship
- Tonnage: 12,975 GRT
- Length: 173.78 metres (570 ft 2 in)
- Beam: 19.71 metres (64 ft 8 in)
- Installed power: 2 x 4 Cyl steam engines
- Propulsion: Two screws
- Sail plan: Southampton - Cape Town
- Speed: 17.5 knots

RMS Kenilworth Castle was a British Passenger ship that served for the Union-Castle Line until its scrapping in 1937. It also served as a troop transport during the First World War. This was also the last ship Titanic-lookout Reginald Lee served on before his death in 1913.

== Construction ==
Kenilworth Castle was built at the Harland & Wolff shipyard in Belfast, United Kingdom and launched on 15 December 1903 before being completed on 19 May 1904. The ship was 173.78 metres (570 ft 2 in) long and had a beam of 19.71 metres (64 ft 8 in). It was assessed at 12,975 GRT and had 2 x 4 Cyl steam engines driving two screw propellers. The ship could reach a speed of 17.5 knots. It had a sistership named Armandale Castle and were the first mail steamers ordered by the newly merged Union-Castle Line.

== Career ==
Kenilworth Castle mainly served on the Union-Castle line's mail service between Southampton, United Kingdom and Cape Town, South Africa. At the outbreak of World War I in August 1914, Kenilworth Castle was requisitioned by the Admiralty as a troopship and took part in the famous six ship Union-Castle convoy which brought 4000 troops to mainland Europe that same year.

Kenilworth Castle was sailing in the English Channel in convoy at 12.30am on 4 June 1918 with all its lights out, when it collided with the stern of the destroyer HMS Rival off Eddystone Lighthouse after it herself tried to avoid a collision with another vessel in the convoy who had changed its course. A number of live depth charges, which were stored on the destroyer's stern, went overboard and exploded underneath the Kenilworth Castle's stern. The ship was badly damaged but remained afloat and reached nearby Plymouth by 8am. The accident also killed 15 crew of the Kenilworth Castle after the two lifeboats they were in got swamped while they were trying to evacuate after believing the ship had been torpedoed. The ship was subsequently repaired from June 1918 to July 1919, when it returned to commercial service, retaking its old route.

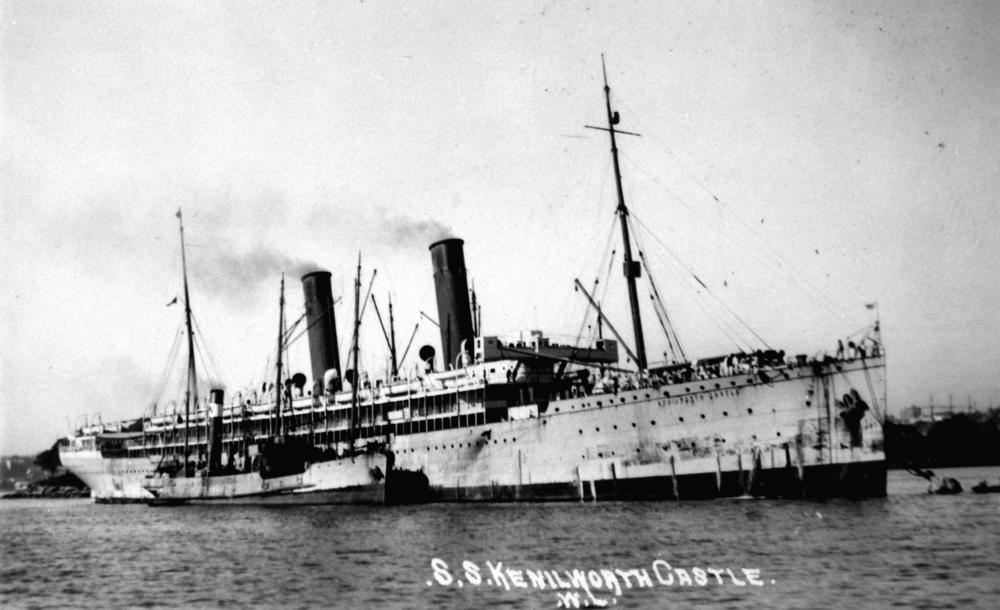
Kenilworth Castle towards the end of her career.

In 1919 the ship was quarantined at Table Bay for three weeks due to an influenza epidemic which was raging throughout South Africa. The ship was refitted between April and June 1928 and its second-class accommodations were removed in 1934.

== Scrapping ==
The Kenilworth Castle was withdrawn from service in May 1936 and ultimately scrapped at Newport, Wales, United Kingdom in 1937.
