= RMS Pendennis Castle =

Royal Mail passenger and cargo ship launched in 1957

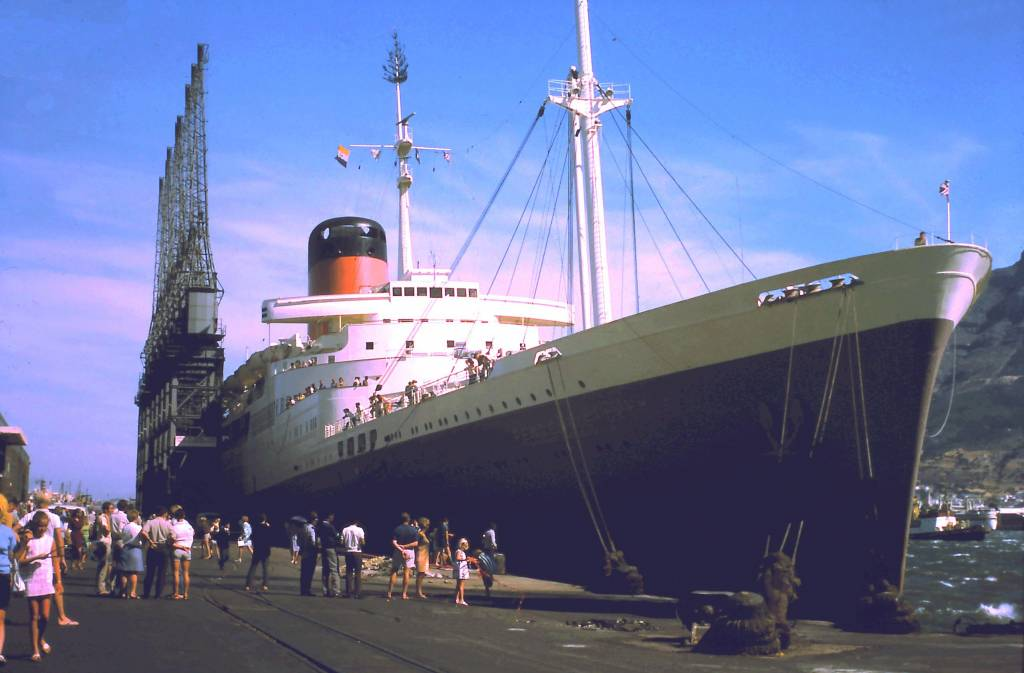
- The ocean liner Pendennis Castle moored at Cape Town in December 1969

History

United Kingdom
- Name: 1958–1976: Pendennis Castle; 1976–1978: Ocean Queen; 1978–1980: Sinbad I (Sinbad 1)
- Owner: 1958–1976 Union-Castle Mail Steam Ship Company Ltd.; 1976–77 Ocean Queen Navigation Corp.; 1977–80 Kinvara Bay Shipping Ltd.
- Port of registry: 1958–1976: London, United Kingdom; 1976–1980: Panama, Panama
- Route: Southampton, Las Palmas, Cape Town, Port Elizabeth, East London, Durban
- Builder: Harland & Wolff, Belfast
- Launched: 24 December 1957
- Christened: 10 December 1957
- Completed: November 1958
- Maiden voyage: 1 January 1959
- Out of service: 14 June 1976
- Identification: IMO number: 5273808
- Fate: Scrapped 1980, in Kaohsiung, Taiwan

General characteristics
- Type: Ocean liner
- Tonnage: 28,582 GRT (1967, 28,453 GRT. 1972, 28,442 GRT)
- Length: 764 ft (233 m)
- Beam: 83.6 ft (25.5 m)
- Draught: 32 ft (9.8 m)
- Installed power: 46,000 shaft horsepower
- Propulsion: steam turbines driving twin screws via reduction gearing
- Speed: 22.5 knots (41.7 km/h; 25.9 mph)
- Capacity: 197 First Class, 473 Tourist Class (670 total) 475 Crew

RMS Pendennis Castle was a Royal Mail Ship, passenger and cargo liner operated by the Union-Castle Line. The vessel served the Union-Castle Line from 1959–1976 on a regular route between the UK and South Africa for the Southampton to Las Palmas, Cape Town, Port Elizabeth, East London and Durban "Cape Mail" service. After her withdrawal from service and subsequent sale by the Union-Castle Line in 1976, she was re-named consecutively Ocean Queen, Sinbad, then Sinbad I, however she never returned to commercial service after her Union-Castle Line service and was sold for scrap in 1980.

== Design and construction ==
In 1953 Sir George Christopher assumed leadership of Union-Castle. Early in 1955 the company ordered Pendennis Castle from Harland & Wolff to replace the ageing Arundel Castle which then had over 30 years of service. The new ship's keel was laid on 8 November 1955. On 31 January 1956 the Union-Castle Mail Steam Ship Co.Ltd merged with Clan Line Steamers Ltd. to form British & Commonwealth Shipping Company. The merger resulted in Clan Line people taking the leading role in the new company's management and they immediately decided to improve and enlarge Pendennis Castle even though she was already under construction. The ship had originally been intended as a third example of the Pretoria Castle class, but the fitting of Denny-Brown stabilizers required lengthening amidships and her overall length was increased by 18ft. Pendennis Castle was to be launched on 10 December 1957 but a shipyard strike caused the launching to be cancelled and she was instead simply christened by the Dowager Lady Rotherwick. On 24 December 1957 she was launched without ceremony. After successful sea trials Pendennis Castle was delivered to Union-Castle by Harland and Wolff on 14 November 1958.

== Union-Castle service ==
RMS Pendennis Castle embarked on her maiden voyage on 1 January 1959. Commanded by Commodore George Mayhew of the Union-Castle fleet, she set out from Southampton bound for Durban. The shipping press voted Pendennis Castle as the "ship of the year"

In 1964 the vessel's air conditioning was extended into all first class cabins. Private showers were fitted into 21 additional cabins. In July 1965 Union-Castle introduced a faster mail service by reducing the voyage time from 13 to 11 days, allowing service to be operated by seven liners instead of eight. Following the success of the introduction of "stewardettes" in the one class Transvaal Castle, these female waiting staff were added to the other ships in the fleet. Attempts at improving the voyage experience for younger passengers led to the introduction of improved recreational programmes, leading some to use the term "fun ship". This, however, did not catch on and is today associated with the vessels of Carnival Cruises.

In May 1968 an onboard fire broke out while Pendennis Castle was berthed in Southampton, resulting in limited damage to some forward accommodation. However the vessel managed to sail with Harland & Wolff workers on board performing the repairs. As a result of the fire, one of two first class passenger lifts remained out of service for the remainder of the ship's career. One year later, when diverted to Antwerp due to labor dispute in Southampton, the vessel struck the quayside and had to be taken out of service for a month. Later that year Pendennis Castle set a new Union-Castle record for the fastest passage time from Cape Town to Southampton.

Rising oil prices in 1973 forced Union-Castle to add one day to the service and increase fares. By 1976 however the move to containerization of cargo and the rise in air travel made the Union-Castle mail ships unprofitable. On 23 April 1976 Pendennis Castle sailed from Southampton for the final time, bound for South Africa. On her final voyage from South Africa to Southampton, the vessel wore a Paying-off pennant. On 14 June 1976, after arriving in Southampton for the final time, she was withdrawn from service.

== Post Union-Castle service ==
Pendennis Castle was sold to the Panama registered Ocean Queen Navigation Company and was renamed Ocean Queen. Now displaying a white hull and golden brown funnel, she sailed for what was intended to be a new service life as a cruise ship, in Hong Kong. However, the vessel would not return to commercial service. In 1978 the ship was sold to Kinvara Bay Shipping of Panama and renamed Sinbad, later amended to Sinbad I, but remained idle. Finally in April 1980 the ex-Pendennis Castle departed Hong Kong for the final time, bound for scrapping in Kaoshiung, Taiwan.
