= SS Armadale Castle =

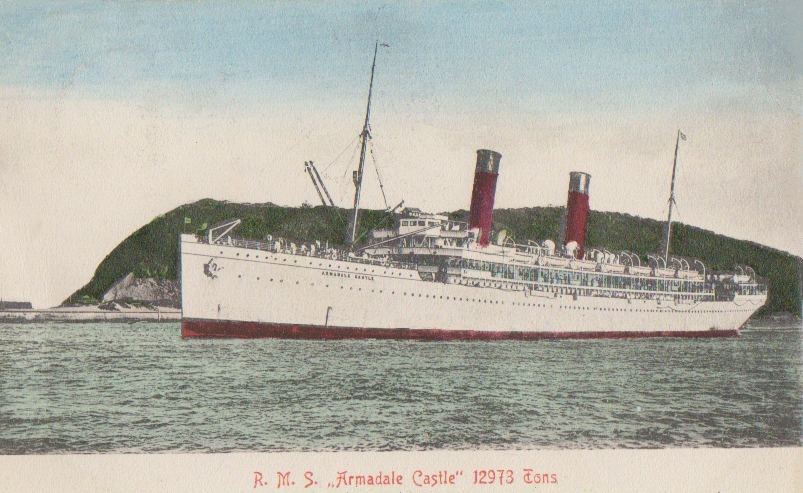
- RMS Armadale Castle around 1904

History

United Kingdom
- Name: Armadale Castle
- Owner: Union-Castle Mail Steamship Co Ltd, London
- Builder: Fairfield Shipbuilding and Engineering, Govan
- Yard number: 424
- Launched: 11 August 1903
- Completed: 1903
- Fate: Arrived for scrapping 12 June 1936

General characteristics
- Type: Passenger vessel
- Tonnage: 12,973 GRT
- Length: 570 ft 1 in (173.76 m)
- Beam: 64 ft 3 in (19.58 m)
- Propulsion: steam, twin screw, two shaft quadruple expansion
- Notes: role: UK – Africa Royal Mail Steamer

SS Armadale Castle was a passenger steamship built in 1903 at Fairfield Shipbuilding and Engineering, Govan, Scotland, for the Union-Castle Mail Steamship Co Ltd, London, the first ship ordered for the newly formed company.

Armadale Castle was requisitioned as an armed merchant cruiser in the Royal Navy 2 August 1914. She was returned to commercial service in 1919. She was laid up at Netley in 1935, reprieved for one voyage, then scrapped in 1936 at Blyth by Hughes Bolckow Ltd.

== See also ==
- Ships built at Govan
