= SS Edinburgh Castle =

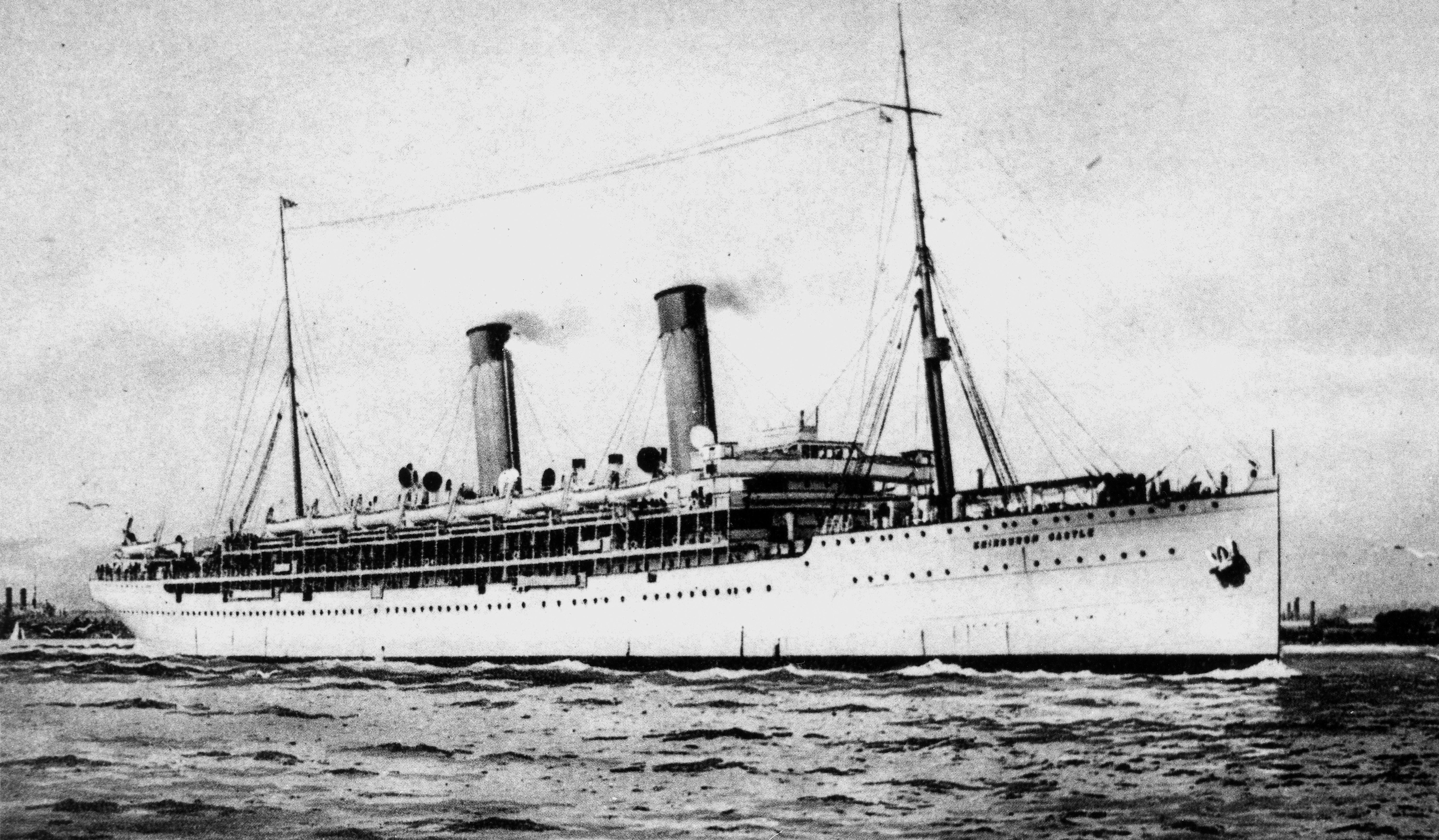
- Edinburgh Castle

History

United Kingdom
- Name: Edinburgh Castle
- Namesake: Edinburgh Castle
- Owner: Union-Castle Line
- Operator: Union-Castle 1910–14, 1919–39; (United Kingdom) Royal Navy 1914–18, 1939–45
- Port of registry: (United Kingdom) London
- Route: England – South Africa
- Builder: Harland and Wolff, Belfast
- Yard number: 410
- Launched: 27 January 1910
- Completed: April 1910
- Maiden voyage: 21 May 1910
- Identification: UK official number 129088; Code letters HQSW (until 1933); call sign GLVR (from 1934)
- Fate: Sunk 25 September 1945

General characteristics
- Type: Ocean liner
- Tonnage: 13,326 GRT, 7,364 NRT
- Length: 570.2 ft (173.8 m)
- Beam: 64.7 ft (19.7 m)
- Depth: 38.7 ft (11.8 m)
- Decks: 4
- Installed power: 2,174 NHP
- Propulsion: 2 × quadruple-expansion engines; 2 × screws
- Speed: 16 knots (30 km/h) service speed
- Capacity: 810 passengers; 155,736 cu ft (4,410 m^{3}) refrigerated cargo
- Armament: 8 × QF 6-inch naval guns
- Notes: sister ship: Balmoral Castle

Edinburgh Castle was a Union-Castle Line steam ocean liner and refrigerated cargo ship that was launched in 1910 and sunk in 1945. In peacetime she was in liner service between Great Britain and South Africa.

Edinburgh Castle was an armed merchant cruiser (AMC) in the First World War and an accommodation ship in the Second World War.

She was the first of two Union-Castle liners called Edinburgh Castle. The second was launched in 1948 and scrapped in 1976.

== Building ==
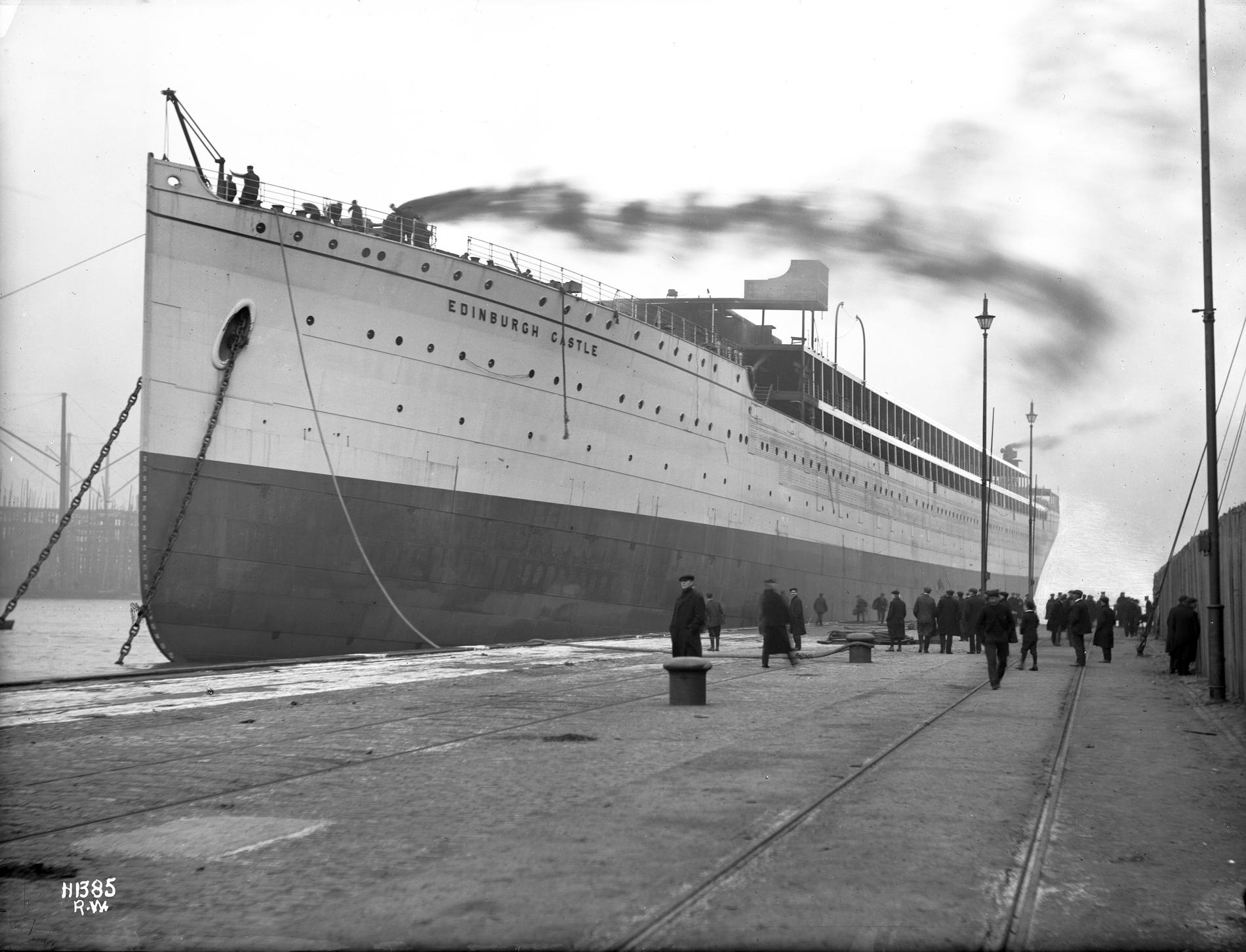
Edinburgh Castle shortly after launching, 27 January 1910

Harland and Wolff built Edinburgh Castle at Belfast, launching her on 27 January 1910 and completing her that April. When she was opened for public inspection on Whit Monday, 16 May 1910 about 1,000 people boarded her. On 21 May 1910 Edinburgh Castle sailed for South Africa. Edinburgh Castle and her sister ship Balmoral Castle (Note: The Fairfield Shipbuilding and Engineering Company, Govan, launched Balmoral Castle on 12 November 1909.) were at the time the largest and most powerful vessels in the South African trade.

Edinburgh Castle's tonnages were 13,326 GRT and 7,364 NRT. She was 570.2 feet (173.8 m) long with a beam of 64.7 feet (19.7 m). She was powered by twin quadruple-expansion steam engines, which drove twin screws and gave her a service speed of 16 knots (30 km/h). She had berths for 810 passengers: 320 in first class, 220 in second class, and 270 in third class. Her holds included 155,736 cu ft (4,410 m^{3}) of refrigerated space.

== Service ==
The ship was operated in line service until 1914, when the Admiralty requisitioned her as an armed merchant cruiser and had her armed with eight QF 6-inch naval guns.

Edinburgh Castle was sent from England with supplies and men for the Royal Navy squadron in the South Atlantic, joining the northern elements of Admiral Craddock's forces at their coaling base off the Brazilian coast on 12 October 1914. The ship was retained as part of the fleet to aid in the search for the German cruiser SMS Karlsruhe. On the redistribution of forces after the German victory at the Battle of Coronel Edinburgh Castle was left with two other British ships in the north until 19 November when detached carrying mail for England.

Edinburgh Castle was returned to her owners in 1918. In 1934 the call sign GLVR superseded her code letters HQSW. From 1938 Union-Castle stationed her at Southampton as reserve ship.

She was requisitioned again for wartime service in the second World War. She was moored at Freetown in Sierra Leone to accommodate survivors of sunken ships. After the war, it was deemed uneconomic to return her to the UK. She was sunk as a target west of Freetown.
