= List of shipwrecks in 1933 =

The list of shipwrecks in 1933 includes ships sunk, foundered, grounded, or otherwise lost during 1933.

table of contents
1933
Jan	Feb	Mar	Apr
May	Jun	Jul	Aug
Sep	Oct	Nov	Dec
Unknown date

== January ==
=== 1 January ===
List of shipwrecks: 1 January 1933
Ship	State	Description
Malygin	Soviet Union	The cargo liner ran aground at Greenharbour. The passengers were taken off. She was reported as still aground on 5 January, severely damaged.

=== 3 January ===
List of shipwrecks: 3 January 1933
Ship	State	Description
Silverfield	United Kingdom	The coaster ran aground at Piel Island, Lancashire. She was refloated on 12 January.

=== 4 January ===
List of shipwrecks: 4 January 1933
Ship	State	Description
Alma	Greece	The cargo ship ran aground at Tenedos, Turkey. She was refloated on 8 January, but was subsequently scrapped.

=== 5 January ===
List of shipwrecks: 5 January 1933
Ship	State	Description
Evina	Norway	The tanker ran aground on the Rabbit Islands, Turkey. She was refloated on 10 January.
Forest Green	Sweden	The barquentine was destroyed by fire at Strömstad, Västra Götaland County.

=== 6 January ===
List of shipwrecks: 6 January 1933
Ship	State	Description
L'Atlantique	France	The ocean liner caught fire off Guernsey, Channel Islands. She was towed into Cherbourg, Seine Maritime but was declared a total loss. L'Atlantique was scrapped in February 1936 after her insurers insisted she was salvageable but lost the resultant court case.

=== 8 January ===
List of shipwrecks: 8 January 1933
Ship	State	Description
Hougomont	Finland	The barque was scuttled at Stenhouse Bay, South Australia, to form a breakwater.
Stratis	Greece	The cargo ship foundered in the Atlantic Ocean off Cape Finisterre, Spain. All crew were rescued by Virginia (Denmark).

=== 15 January ===
List of shipwrecks: 15 January 1933
Ship	State	Description
Taronga	Norway	The cargo ship caught fire at Perim, South Yemen and was beached to prevent her capsizing. The fire continued to burn and she was scuttled.

=== 17 January ===
List of shipwrecks: 17 January 1933
Ship	State	Description
Ella	Sweden	The cargo ship touched bottom at Sandhamn. She was consequently beached.
Le Tell	France	The cargo ship ran aground at the mouth of the Rhône. She was refloated on 20 February.

=== 19 January ===
List of shipwrecks: 19 January 1933
Ship	State	Description
Adder	United Kingdom	The Thames barge collided with Waziristan (United Kingdom) in the River Thames at Greenwich and was consequently beached.
Hsing Ningshun	China	The cargo ship ran aground in the Yangtze downstream of Kiukiang. She was refloated on 31 January.

=== 20 January ===
List of shipwrecks: 20 January 1933
Ship	State	Description
Exeter City	United Kingdom	The cargo ship foundered in the Atlantic Ocean 600 nautical miles (1,100 km) off Cape Race, Newfoundland (47°27′N 39°23′W). All 22 crew were rescued by American Merchant (United States).
Ranan Maru	Japan	The cargo ship came ashore on the east coast of Korea. She was refloated on 31 January.
Tiverton	United States	The coaster came ashore at Eureka, California and was wrecked. The crew were rescued.

=== 21 January ===
List of shipwrecks: 21 January 1933
Ship	State	Description
Eugenie	Sweden	The schooner ran aground on Hanö. She was refloated on 25 January.
Vassilos A. Polemis	Greece	The cargo ship ran aground at Ochakiv, Soviet Union and subsequently became icebound. She was refloated on 11 February.

=== 23 January ===
List of shipwrecks: 23 January 1933
Ship	State	Description
Sea Otter	United States	After her gasoline engine failed during a voyage in Southeast Alaska from Taku Harbor to Juneau with two passengers and a single crewman aboard, the 7-gross register ton, 27.6-foot (8.4 m) motor vessel drifted onto rocks and was wrecked at Point Arden (58°09′30″N 134°10′30″W). All aboard survived, but they were not rescued from the vessel until 27 January.

=== 24 January ===
List of shipwrecks: 24 January 1933
Ship	State	Description
Abdel Kader	Egypt	The cargo ship was driven ashore at Alexandretta, Turkey. She was refloated on 3 February.
Umnak Native	United States	During a voyage from Unalaska to Atka with ten passengers, four crewmembers, and a cargo that included furs, 100 blue fox pups, and general merchandise, the 49-gross register ton, 59.2-foot (18.0 m) Unangan Aleut trading vessel – a motor vessel – broke up and sank when her engine failed to start after her anchor chain broke during a violent storm while she was moored in Inanudak Bay at Umnak in the Fox Islands, part of the Aleutian Islands in the Territory of Alaska. There were four survivors, all of them crew members; the other 11 people aboard drowned or died of exposure.

=== 25 January ===
List of shipwrecks: 25 January 1933
Ship	State	Description
Kachosan Maru	Japan	The cargo ship ran aground off Qingdao, China. She was refloated on 31 January.

=== 27 January ===
List of shipwrecks: 27 January 1933
Ship	State	Description
Burray Ness	United Kingdom	The coaster struck rocks 7 nautical miles (13 km) south of Wick, Caithness and was consequently beached at Sarolot. The crew survived.

=== 28 January ===
List of shipwrecks: 28 January 1933
Ship	State	Description
Pallpetro	Romania	The coastal tanker foundered in the Black Sea off Iniada, Turkey.
Shinton Maru	Japan	The cargo ship ran aground at Taidon Gan, on the west coast of Korea. She broke in two and was a total loss.

=== 30 January ===
List of shipwrecks: 30 January 1933
Ship	State	Description
Cambalu	United Kingdom	The coaster ran aground 6 nautical miles (11 km) west of Hartland Point, Devon. All nine crew were rescued.
Malchace	United States	The cargo ship ran aground in Long Island Sound off City Island, Bronx, New York. She was refloated on 3 February.

=== 31 January ===
List of shipwrecks: 31 January 1933
Ship	State	Description
Ermland	Germany	The cargo ship ran aground on the Juisan Reef, in the Philippine Sea 50 nautical miles (93 km) south of Cebu City, Philippines. She was refloated on 4 February.
Kate	United Kingdom	The schooner caught fire and sank in the Irish Sea off Anglesey. All five crew were rescued by the Moelfre Lifeboat.
Kola	Soviet Union	The cargo ship ran aground in Brønnøysund and was beached. She was still aground on 2 February with salvage efforts continuing with the expectation that she would be refloated within a week.

=== Unknown date ===
List of shipwrecks: Unknown date in January 1933
Ship	State	Description
France	France	The ocean liner was damaged by fire at Le Havre. Consequently withdrawn from service and scrapped.

== February ==
=== 2 February ===
List of shipwrecks: 2 February 1933
Ship	State	Description
Bering Sea	United States	While her two-man crew was attempting to repair her gasoline engine, the 44-net register ton motor vessel dragged her anchor during a gale and drifted ashore on the coast of Prince of Wales Island in the Alexander Archipelago in Southeast Alaska 3 nautical miles (5.6 km; 3.5 mi) south of Chomley Sound, now known as Cholmondeley Sound (55°17′N 132°04′W). She became a total loss. Her crew abandoned ship 50 feet (15 m) offshore in a skiff which was itself swamped and washed onto rocks, but both men survived.

=== 3 February ===
List of shipwrecks: 3 February 1933
Ship	State	Description
Estrild	Denmark	The cargo ship ran aground at Audierne, Finistère, France. The crew were rescued.
Klas	Sweden	The coaster came ashore at Varberg, Halland County. The crew were rescued by lifeboat.
Romulus	Norway	The cargo ship ran aground at Constanţa, Romania. She was refloated on 7 February.

=== 4 February ===
List of shipwrecks: 4 February 1933
Ship	State	Description
Ellin	Greece	The cargo ship ran aground in the English Channel off the Seven Sisters, Sussex, United Kingdom. Nineteen of her 29 crew were taken off by the Eastbourne Lifeboat. She was refloated on 7 February.

=== 5 February ===
List of shipwrecks: 5 February 1933
Ship	State	Description
Aracatuba	Brazil	The passenger ship was stranded on a breakwater at Rio Grande do Sul and was a total loss. All aboard were rescued.
Fotis	Greece	The cargo ship ran aground at Etinas Point, Italy. She was refloated on 10 February.

=== 6 February ===
List of shipwrecks: 6 February 1933
Ship	State	Description
Mango	United Kingdom	The coaster ran aground off Arranmore, County Donegal, Ireland and was wrecked. The crew survived.
Rey Jaime II	Spain	The cargo ship ran aground on the south of Menorca, Balearic Islands. She was refloated on 16 February.
Thistle	United Kingdom	The Thames barge collided with the cutter Vigilant the Second (United Kingdom) in the River Thames at Woolwich and sank with the loss of one of her three crew.

=== 9 February ===
List of shipwrecks: 9 February 1933
Ship	State	Description
Torbrand	Norway	The cargo ship ran aground west of Skagen, Denmark. The crew were rescued.

=== 11 February ===
List of shipwrecks: 11 February 1933
Ship	State	Description
Santiago	Chile	The cargo ship caught fire at Puntamala, Panama and was abandoned by her crew.

=== 13 February ===
List of shipwrecks: 13 February 1933
Ship	State	Description
Hans Otto Ippen II	Germany	The cargo ship came ashore at Darßer Ort, Mecklenburg-Vorpommern. The crew were rescued by lifeboats. She was refloated the next day.

=== 14 February ===
List of shipwrecks: 14 February 1933
Ship	State	Description
La Gaillarde	France	The auxiliary schooner was in collision with Upo Mendi ( Spain) in the Mediterranean Sea (42°45′N 9°34′E) and sank. The crew were rescued by Upo Mendi.
Maj-Britt	Sweden	The auxiliary sailing vessel sprang a leak and sank in the Baltic Sea off Helsingborg, Skåne County. The crew were rescued.

=== 18 February ===
List of shipwrecks: 18 February 1933
Ship	State	Description
Gofuku Maru	Japan	The cargo ship came ashore at Obtasaki, Ōshima. She broke in two on 20 January and was a total loss.

=== 19 February ===
List of shipwrecks: 19 February 1933
Ship	State	Description
Montrose	United Kingdom	The ocean liner ran aground in Liverpool Bay off the Crosby Lightship (United Kingdom). Bison (United Kingdom) took off 186 passengers and landed them at Liverpool, Lancashire. Montrose was refloated later that day.

=== 20 February ===
List of shipwrecks: 20 February 1933
Ship	State	Description
Pena Castillo	Spain	The coaster was driven ashore at Luarca, Asturias and sank with the loss of ten of her eleven crew.
Priareggia	Italy	The cargo ship ran aground on Pellestrina, Venice, Italy. The crew were taken off the next day.
Vittoria V	Italy	The cargo ship sprang a leak in the Tyrrhenian Sea 15 nautical miles (28 km) south of Capri, Campania and was abandoned by her crew. She sank the next day.

=== 21 February ===
List of shipwrecks: 21 February 1933
Ship	State	Description
USS Moody	United States	Sold to Metro-Goldwyn-Mayer for use in the filming the movie Hell Below, the decommissioned Clemson-class destroyer was sunk with explosive charges during filming of a scene depicting the sinking of a World War I German destroyer.

=== 23 February ===
List of shipwrecks: 23 February 1933
Ship	State	Description
Faro	Finland	The cargo ship came ashore 4 nautical miles (7.4 km) south of the Bovbjerg Lighthouse, Denmark and was wrecked.

=== 24 February ===
List of shipwrecks: 24 February 1933
Ship	State	Description
Yi Chang	China	The cargo ship collided with Saitsu Maru (Japan) in the Yangtze at Tientsin and was beached.

=== 25 February ===
List of shipwrecks: 25 February 1933
Ship	State	Description
Enda	United Kingdom	The coaster came ashore at Gawnle Point, Mull of Galloway, Wigtownshire and was wrecked. All passengers and crew were rescued.
Overton	United Kingdom	The coaster struck a rock off Saint Peter Port, Guernsey, Channel Islands and sank. All crew were rescued. She was refloated on 3 March.

=== 26 February ===
List of shipwrecks: 26 February 1933
Ship	State	Description
Edna	United Kingdom	The coaster ran aground on the Mull of Galloway, Wigtownshire. All passengers and crew were taken off by Sodium (United Kingdom).
Eilande	United Kingdom	The coaster ran aground in the Tyne Estuary. All crew were rescued by the North Shields Lifeboat. She was refloated on 11 March.

=== 28 February ===
List of shipwrecks: 28 February 1933
Ship	State	Description
Zampa	Denmark	The schooner was abandoned in the Mediterranean Sea 75 nautical miles (139 km) off Tripoli, Libya. The crew survived.

== March ==
=== 1 March ===
List of shipwrecks: 1 March 1933
Ship	State	Description
Marwick Head	United Kingdom	The coaster was driven ashore at Bridlington, Yorkshire after losing her rudder. She was refloated on 10 March.

=== 2 March ===
List of shipwrecks: 2 March 1933
Ship	State	Description
Bretagne	Denmark	The cargo ship collided with Redsea (United Kingdom) in the North Sea off the Hook of Holland, South Holland, Netherlands and was beached.
Clara	Netherlands	The cargo ship foundered in the Atlantic Ocean off Blackwater Head, County Wexford, Ireland. All aboard were rescued by Ierne (Ireland).

=== 6 March ===
List of shipwrecks: 6 March 1933
Ship	State	Description
Antung	United Kingdom	The ship ran aground at Mofu Point, China and was wrecked. All passengers and crew were rescued by Anhui (United Kingdom).
Gugnir	Norway	The sealer foundered in the White Sea. All crew were rescued.
Inca	Chile	The coaster sprang a leak and came ashore at Cucahua. The crew were rescued. She was subsequently declared a total loss.
Prinsesse Ragnhild	Norway	The cargo ship ran aground at Kiberg, Norway and was consequently beached.

=== 7 March ===
List of shipwrecks: 7 March 1933
Ship	State	Description
Anne	Sweden	The motor schooner collided with Iwan (Sweden) in the Baltic Sea off Malmö and sank. The crew were rescued by Iwan. She was raised on 15 March.
Tritone	Italy	The tanker ran aground at Marmara Point, Tenedos, Turkey. She was refloated on 12 March.

=== 8 March ===
List of shipwrecks: 8 March 1933
Ship	State	Description
Bartin	Turkey	The cargo ship ran aground off Cape Kerempeh. She was refloated on 11 March.
Kharkov	Soviet Union	The cargo ship ran aground on the Turkish coast 7 nautical miles (13 km) from the entrance to the Bosporus. She was still aground on 16 March, with salvage operations continuing. She was refloated on 18 April, towed to Istanbul and beached there.

=== 10 March ===
List of shipwrecks: 10 March 1933
Ship	State	Description
Aghios Gerassimos	Greece	The cargo ship ran aground at Gothenburg, Sweden. She was refloated on 13 March.
Porto Rico	United States	The cargo ship ran aground off San Juan, Puerto Rico. She was refloated on 21 March.

=== 11 March ===
List of shipwrecks: 11 March 1933
Ship	State	Description
Niord	Norway	The cargo ship struck a submerged wreck and sank in the Skaggerak off Mandal, Norway.

=== 14 March ===
List of shipwrecks: 14 March 1933
Ship	State	Description
Burnside	United Kingdom	The cargo ship caught fire at Lochmaddy, Outer Hebrides and sank. All eight crew survived.
Hinnøy	Norway	The cargo ship exploded and sank in the Indian Ocean 300 nautical miles (560 km) off Colombo, Ceylon (7°30′N 75°00′E) with the loss of fifteen of her 28 crew. Survivors were rescued by Naples Maru (Japan).
Kinsen Maru	Japan	The cargo ship foundered in the Pacific Ocean 400 nautical miles (740 km) off the coast of Queensland, Australia (20°53′S 156°54′E) with the loss of 25 of her 38 crew. Survivors were rescued by Hide Maru (Japan).

=== 15 March ===
List of shipwrecks: 15 March 1933
Ship	State	Description
Reliance	United States	The 18-gross register ton, 40-foot (12.2 m) fishing vessel sank off Tree Point (54°48′15″N 130°55′45″W) in Southeast Alaska. Her entire crew of four perished.

=== 19 March ===
List of shipwrecks: 19 March 1933
Ship	State	Description
Tarapaca	Chile	The cargo ship ran aground in the Gray Channel. She was refloated on 24 March.

=== 21 March ===
List of shipwrecks: 21 March 1933
Ship	State	Description
Suzanne	Norway	The cargo ship ran aground at Swatow, China. She was abandoned as a total loss on 31 March.

=== 22 March ===
List of shipwrecks: 22 March 1933
Ship	State	Description
Juli	Spain	The coaster foundered in the Mediterranean Sea 10 nautical miles (19 km) west of Cape Sarda. All crew were rescued.

=== 23 March ===
List of shipwrecks: 23 March 1933
Ship	State	Description
Madeleine	France	The cargo ship foundered in the North Sea (53°50′N 3°50′E). All crew were rescued by Holland (flag unknown).

=== 25 March ===
List of shipwrecks: 25 March 1933
Ship	State	Description
President Madison	United States	The ocean liner capsized and sank at Seattle, Washington with the loss of two lives. She was refloated on 13 April, repaired, and returned to service.
Tum Tum	United States	The 13-gross register ton, 36-foot (11 m) motor vessel was destroyed by fire at Petersburg, Territory of Alaska. The only person aboard survived.

=== 26 March ===
List of shipwrecks: 26 March 1933
Ship	State	Description
Arundale	United Kingdom	The cargo ship ran aground at Ceuta, Spain. She later broke her back and salvage attempts were abandoned.

=== 27 March ===
List of shipwrecks: 27 March 1933
Ship	State	Description
Phedon	Greece	The cargo ship foundered off Rosas, Catalonia, Spain. The crew were rescued.
Sacro Cuore	Italy	The cargo ship came ashore at Riposto, Sicily. The crew were rescued.

=== 29 March ===
List of shipwrecks: 29 March 1933
Ship	State	Description
Borgfred	Norway	The cargo ship ran aground at Audierne, Finistère, France. She was refloated on 3 April.

=== Unknown date ===
List of shipwrecks: Unknown date March 1933
Ship	State	Description
Vladimir	Yugoslavia	The ship foundered in the Mediterranean Sea before 31 March. Sixteen crew were rescued by Comanchee (United Kingdom) and landed at Bizerta, Algeria on that date.

== April ==
=== 1 April ===
List of shipwrecks: 1 April 1933
Ship	State	Description
Castor	United States	The 8-gross register ton, 33.8-foot (10.3 m) fishing vessel was destroyed by fire off Tree Point Light in the Alexander Archipelago in Southeast Alaska.
Magda	Sweden	The cargo ship ran aground on Viel Island, Smyth Channel, Chile and was wrecked. The crew were rescued by Don Ricardo (Chile).

=== 4 April ===
List of shipwrecks: 4 April 1933
Ship	State	Description
HSwMS Gustav V	Swedish Navy	The Sverige-class coastal defence ship ran aground off Malmö. She was refloated on 6 April.
Haleric	United Kingdom	The cargo ship ran aground at Paternoster Point, South Africa. She was refloated and taken in tow but foundered the next day.

=== 5 April ===
List of shipwrecks: 5 April 1933
Ship	State	Description
Edouard Giraud	France	The cargo ship ran aground 30 nautical miles (56 km) south of Tuléar, Madagascar. She was still aground on 11 April and was described as being in "a critical condition".

=== 9 April ===
List of shipwrecks: 9 April 1933
Ship	State	Description
Evermore	Latvia	The cargo ship suffered an onboard explosion and sank in the Bay of Biscay (45°55′N 7°20′W) and sank. All crew were rescued by Dempo (Netherlands).
Juyo Maru	Japan	The cargo ship ran aground on Duck Island, Victoria, Australia. She was refloated on 11 May.

=== 13 April ===
List of shipwrecks: 13 April 1933
Ship	State	Description
Fjorden	Norway	The cargo ship sank at Hong Kong.

=== 18 April ===
List of shipwrecks: 18 April 1933
Ship	State	Description
Ariel	Sweden	The cargo ship struck rocks off the Hormigas Islands, Spain and was consequently beached at Cape Palos, Murcia. She was refloated on 22 April.

=== 20 April ===
List of shipwrecks: 20 April 1933
Ship	State	Description
Riva Sicula	Italy	The tanker ran aground at Almadi Point, French West Africa. She was refloated later that day and sailed to Dakar. She was declared a constructive total loss, and was taken out to sea and sunk on 24 May.

=== 23 April ===
List of shipwrecks: 23 April 1933
Ship	State	Description
Peryneas	United Kingdom	The cargo ship ran aground on Mud Island, Ontario, Canada. She broke in two and was a total loss. The crew were rescued.
Shidzuoka Maru	Japan	The cargo ship ran aground on the North East Reef, off Yap Island, Caroline Islands. Salvage efforts were abandoned on 16 May and she was declared a total loss.
Vadstena	Sweden	The cargo ship collided with Regulus (Sweden) at Gothenburg and sank. All crew survived.

=== 24 April ===
List of shipwrecks: 24 April 1933
Ship	State	Description
Ruslan	Soviet Navy	The rescue ship was sunk by ice. She was on a voyage from Spitsbergen to Murmansk.

=== 26 April ===
List of shipwrecks: 26 April 1933
Ship	State	Description
Rouslan	Soviet Union	The salvage vessel foundered in the Atlantic Ocean south of South Cape, Spitzbergen with the loss of twenty of her 23 crew. Survivors were rescued by Ringsel (Norway).

=== 27 April ===
List of shipwrecks: 27 April 1933
Ship	State	Description
Tabasco	United States	The refrigerated cargo ship ran aground 60 nautical miles (110 km) north of Progreso, Texas. She was abandoned as a total loss on 3 May. The crew were rescued by Relief (United States).

=== 30 April ===
List of shipwrecks: 30 April 1933
Ship	State	Description
Bermuda	United Kingdom	The refrigerated cargo liner came ashore in Eddrachillis Bay, Sutherland while being towed from Belfast to Rosyth for scrapping. Salvage was deemed impracticable.
Tone	Imperial Japanese Navy	The decommissioned protected cruiser was sunk as a target by Imperial Japanese Navy aircraft off Amami Ōshima.

== May ==
=== 2 May ===
List of shipwrecks: 2 May 1933
Ship	State	Description
Capitaine Paul Lemerle	France	The cargo ship ran aground on Martinique. She was refloated on 6 May.

=== 5 May ===
List of shipwrecks: 5 May 1933
Ship	State	Description
Eurasia	Latvia	The four-masted schooner came ashore at Bocas, Panama and was wrecked.
Florence Dombey	United Kingdom	The 115.5-foot (35.2 m), 182-ton steam trawler sprung a leak and sank 6 miles (9.7 km) north of Longstone Lighthouse (55°45′N 01°37′W). The crew jumped aboard Aurora (United Kingdom) as Florence Dombey sank.

=== 6 May ===
List of shipwrecks: 6 May 1933
Ship	State	Description
Englishman	United Kingdom	The schooner foundered in Musselwick Bay, Pembrokeshire. The crew were rescued by the ketch Agnes (United Kingdom).

=== 7 May ===
List of shipwrecks: 7 May 1933
Ship	State	Description
Jamaica	Sweden	The coaster collided with Malines (United Kingdom) in the Scheldt off Vlissingen, South Holland, Netherlands and sank. The crew were rescued. Salvage efforts were abandoned on 14 May.

=== 8 May ===
List of shipwrecks: 8 May 1933
Ship	State	Description
City of Anacortes	United States	The 41-gross register ton, 62.8-foot (19.1 m) motor passenger vessel was wrecked in Portland Canal in Southeast Alaska near the border with British Columbia, Canada. All six people aboard survived.

=== 12 May ===
List of shipwrecks: 12 May 1933
Ship	State	Description
Cuatro Hermanos	Peru	The four-masted schooner sprang a leak off Callao and was beached. She was a total loss.

=== 15 May ===
List of shipwrecks: 15 May 1933
Ship	State	Description
Stakesby	United Kingdom	The cargo ship ran aground at Buenos Aires, Argentina. She was refloated four days later and returned to service.
Vinci	Italy	The cargo ship came ashore at Port-Saint-Louis-du-Rhône, Bouches-du-Rhône, France. She was refloated on 20 May.

=== 18 May ===
List of shipwrecks: 18 May 1933
Ship	State	Description
Seirstad	Norway	The cargo ship struck an iceberg and sank in the Atlantic Ocean off Cape St. Francis, Newfoundland. The crew were rescued.

=== 19 May ===
List of shipwrecks: 19 May 1933
Ship	State	Description
Apex No. 2	United States	The 22-gross register ton, 38-foot (11.6 m) fishing vessel was wrecked on Near Island at Kodiak, Territory of Alaska. The only person aboard survived.
Seminole	United Kingdom	The tanker ran aground in the Dardanelles. She was refloated on 25 May.

=== 20 May ===
List of shipwrecks: 20 May 1933
Ship	State	Description
Kingston	United States	The 171-gross register ton, 98-foot (29.9 m) steam passenger vessel was wrecked in Whitestone Narrows (57°14′50″N 135°33′45″W) in Southeast Alaska 16 nautical miles (30 km; 18 mi) northwest of Sitka, Territory of Alaska. All 12 people aboard survived.

=== 21 May ===
List of shipwrecks: 21 May 1933
Ship	State	Description
May	United Kingdom	The Thames barge collided with Cambridge (United Kingdom) in the English Channel off Portland Bill, Dorset and sank with the loss of two of her three crew. The survivor was rescued by Cambridge.

=== 22 May ===
List of shipwrecks: 22 May 1933
Ship	State	Description
Sansei Maru	Japan	The cargo ship ran aground at Odatejima and broke in two. She was declared a total loss.

=== 23 May ===
List of shipwrecks: 23 May 1933
Ship	State	Description
Shinko Maru	Japan	The cargo ship collided with Yodo Maru (Japan) in the Yellow Sea off the west coast of Korea and sank.
Warden Court	United Kingdom	The Thames barge collided with Buoyant (United Kingdom) in the River Thames and was beached.

=== 26 May ===
List of shipwrecks: 26 May 1933
Ship	State	Description
Mari	Norway	The coaster ran aground at Inniscrone, County Sligo, Ireland. She was refloated on 6 June.

=== 27 May ===
List of shipwrecks: 27 May 1933
Ship	State	Description
George M. Cox	United States	The passenger ship ran aground near the Rock of Ages Lighthouse, Michigan. All 127 passengers and crew were rescued. She remained on the rocks until the following October when she broke up in a storm.

=== 28 May ===
List of shipwrecks: 28 May 1933
Ship	State	Description
Nippon Maru	Japan	The tanker ran aground at Honda Point, California, United States. The crew were rescued. Salvage efforts were abandoned on 6 June.
Rosina Richichi	Italy	The brigantine was wrecked at Bagnara Calabra, Calabria. The crew were rescued.

=== 29 May ===
List of shipwrecks: 29 May 1933
Ship	State	Description
George M. Embiricos	Greece	The cargo ship ran aground 10 nautical miles (19 km) south of Faro el Rincon, Argentina. She was refloated on 7 June.

=== 31 May ===
List of shipwrecks: 31 May 1933
Ship	State	Description
Matsuura Maru	Japan	The cargo ship struck a rock off Korea and was beached.

=== Unknown date ===
List of shipwrecks: unknown date May 1933
Ship	State	Description
Säntis or Saentis	Switzerland	The passenger ship was scuttled in Lake Constance in 210 metres (690 ft) of water as uneconomic to operate. The wreck is scheduled to be raised in March–April 2024.

== June ==
=== 1 June ===
List of shipwrecks: 1 June 1933
Ship	State	Description
Basil	United Kingdom	The cargo ship ran aground10 nautical miles (19 km) north of Óbidos, Brazil. She was refloated on 14 June.
Guildford Castle	United Kingdom	The Union-Castle Line cargo ship collided with Stentor in the Elbe upstream of Cuxhaven, Germany and was beached. She was declared a total loss.

=== 5 June ===
List of shipwrecks: 5 June 1933
Ship	State	Description
Skeldergate	United Kingdom	The cargo ship ran aground in the Paraná River, Argentina. She was refloated on 10 June.
Zurichmoor	United Kingdom	The cargo ship ran aground in the Paraná River. She was refloated on 13 June.

=== 8 June ===
List of shipwrecks: 8 June 1933
Ship	State	Description
Amarante	Brazil	The cargo ship collided with a sunken lighter at Rio Grande do Norte and was consequently beached.
Cisneros	United Kingdom	The cargo ship sank in the Magdalena River at Puerto Berrío, Columbia and was a total loss.
Herbert and Harold	United Kingdom	The Thames barge collided with Jamaica Progress (United Kingdom) in the River Thames at Gravesend, Kent and sank. The crew were rescued.
Holmdene	United Kingdom	The cargo ship ran aground in the Paraná River, Argentina. She was refloated on 12 June.

=== 11 June ===
List of shipwrecks: 11 June 1933
Ship	State	Description
Wellamo	Finland	The schooner ran aground at Thyborøn, Jutland, Denmark. She was refloated but found to be leaking and was consequently beached. She was refloated on 13 June and towed to Aalborg.

=== 14 June ===
List of shipwrecks: 14 June 1933
Ship	State	Description
Hartlepool	United Kingdom	The cargo ship ran aground in the Paraná River, Argentina. She was refloated on 25 June.

=== 17 June ===
List of shipwrecks: 17 June 1933
Ship	State	Description
Advance	flag unknown	The ship sank in the Manning River, New South Wales, Australia.

=== 18 June ===
List of shipwrecks: 18 June 1933
Ship	State	Description
Iris	Germany	The coaster foundered in the Baltic Sea 10 nautical miles (19 km) north of the Oderbank. The crew were rescued.
Monte Piana	Italy	The cargo ship collided with P Margarnos (Greece) in the River Plate estuary off Argentina. Both ships sustained bow damage and flooding in their forepeaks

=== 19 June ===
List of shipwrecks: 19 June 1933
Ship	State	Description
Sheaf Water	United Kingdom	The cargo ship ran aground on the Nekmangrund Shoal, Baltic Sea. She was refloated on 25 June.
Tarraco	Spain	The cargo ship was beached at Setúbal, Portugal.

=== 24 June ===
List of shipwrecks: 24 June 1933
Ship	State	Description
Baron Sempill	United Kingdom	The cargo ship ran aground at Bajo Charcas, Cuba. She was refloated on 5 July.
Christina Fraser	United Kingdom	The coaster last seen off Gabo Island, Victoria, Australia and believed to have foundered soon afterwards in a storm, with the loss of all seventeen crew.
Northmoor	United Kingdom	The cargo ship ran aground at Cape Gallant, in the Straits of Magellan. She was refloated on 8 July.

=== 25 June ===
List of shipwrecks: 25 June 1933
Ship	State	Description
Cerere	Italy	The cargo ship lost her starboard propeller shaft and was subsequently beached at Bajo Charcas, Cuba.

=== 26 June ===
List of shipwrecks: 26 June 1933
Ship	State	Description
Kermikos	Greece	The cargo ship caught fire at Alexandretta, Turkey. Four of her crew were killed. She sank on 2 July and was a total loss.

=== 30 June ===
List of shipwrecks: 30 June 1933
Ship	State	Description
Ramos	United States	The 1,208-gross register ton schooner barge sank in 80 feet (24 m) of water in the North Atlantic Ocean off Sandy Hook, New Jersey, at 40°25.505′N 073°54.071′W.

== July ==
=== 2 July ===
List of shipwrecks: 2 July 1933
Ship	State	Description
Marsland	United Kingdom	The cargo ship ran aground at St. John's, Newfoundland. She was declared a total loss on 14 July.

=== 3 July ===
List of shipwrecks: 3 July 1933
Ship	State	Description
Brema	Germany	The cargo ship capsized and sank off the Horns-Rev Lightship (Denmark). The crew survived.
Corregidor	flag unknown	The ship collided with Ocbu (United States) in Manila Bay off Corregidor Island, Philippines and sank.
Frederick H	United Kingdom	The schooner came ashore on Silver Bank, Turks and Caicos Islands and was wrecked. The crew survived.

=== 6 July ===
List of shipwrecks: 6 July 1933
Ship	State	Description
Nicolas Pacquet	France	Nicolas Paquet The passenger ship ran aground 3.5 nautical miles (6.5 km) off Cape Spartel, Morocco and was wrecked. All 162 people aboard were rescued by Djenne (France).

=== 9 July ===
List of shipwrecks: 9 July 1933
Ship	State	Description
Shibaura Maru	Japan	The cargo ship struck a rock in the South China Sea off Mokpo, Korea and foundered.

=== 11 July ===
List of shipwrecks: 11 July 1933
Ship	State	Description
Toonan	China	The cargo ship collided with Choshun Maru (Japan) at Dairen and sank.

=== 13 July ===
List of shipwrecks: 13 July 1933
Ship	State	Description
City of Baltimore	United States	The ocean liner collided with Beacon (United States) in Chesapeake Bay off Gibson Island, Maryland and was beached. She was later refloated and sailed to Baltimore, Ohio for inspection.

=== 14 July ===
List of shipwrecks: 14 July 1933
Ship	State	Description
Cities Service Petrol	United States	The tanker exploded and sank in the Atlantic Ocean off Wilmington, North Carolina with the loss of at least three of her 34 crew. Survivors were rescued by Gulf Gem and Trimountain (both United States).

=== 19 July ===
List of shipwrecks: 19 July 1933
Ship	State	Description
Elizabeth Drew	United Kingdom	The auxiliary schooner collided with Mimi Horn (Germany) in the English Channel off Folkestone, Kent (51°00′30″N 1°11′45″E) and sank. All four crew were rescued by Mimi Horn.

=== 20 July ===
List of shipwrecks: 20 July 1933
Ship	State	Description
Abuislah	Turkey	The cargo ship collided with Gulcemal (Turkey) at Istanbul and was consequently beached. AShe was refloated on 25 July.

=== 23 July ===
List of shipwrecks: 23 July 1933
Ship	State	Description
Maria Adaro	Spain	The cargo ship ran aground off the Sisargas Islands, Galicia and was abandoned by her crew. She broke her back two days later and was a total loss.

=== 24 July ===
List of shipwrecks: 24 July 1933
Ship	State	Description
Elleros	Egypt	The cargo ship foundered in the Mediterranean Sea 40 nautical miles (74 km) off Alexandria. The crew survived.
Hematite	United Kingdom	The cargo ship collided with Lotte (Germany) in the River Seine at Rouen, Seine-Inférieure, France and was beached. She was refloated later that day.
Itanage	Brazil	The cargo ship ran aground at Porto Alegre. She was refloated on 6 August.

=== 25 July ===
List of shipwrecks: 25 July 1933
Ship	State	Description
Northwestern	United States	The cargo liner ran aground off the Sentinel Island Light, Territory of Alaska, and was subsequently beached on the Eagle River Sand Spit. The passengers were taken off by a United States Government steamship. She later was salvaged and returned to service.

=== 27 July ===
List of shipwrecks: 27 July 1933
Ship	State	Description
Endymion	United Kingdom	The 105-foot (32 m), 164-ton out of service steam trawler was being towed to the breakers yard when she broke loose in rough weather and grounded on the Horse Bank. Salvage attempts failed. The wreck was used as a target in World War II for the Ainsdale Beach Gunnery Range

=== 29 July ===
List of shipwrecks: 29 July 1933
Ship	State	Description
Yawatawa Maru	Japan	The cargo ship ran aground at Yetorofu. She was a total loss.

=== 30 July ===
List of shipwrecks: 30 July 1933
Ship	State	Description
Alkaid	Netherlands	The cargo ship ran aground at Cape Orlov, Soviet Union. She was refloated on 14 September.
Panos	Greece	The cargo ship ran aground off Cape Santa Maria (34°36′S 54°08′W). She was refloated on 3 August.

== August ==
=== 3 August ===
List of shipwrecks: 3 August 1933
Ship	State	Description
Kostanti	Greece	The cargo ship caught fire and was beached off the Regencia Lighthouse, Espírito Santo, Brazil. She was a total loss. The crew were rescued by Alice (United Kingdom) and Murtinho (Brazil).
Reliance	United States	The 109-foot (33 m), 251-gross register ton unpowered lighter was scuttled as a means of disposal in 120 feet (37 m) of water off Boston, Massachusetts, 5 nautical miles (9.3 km; 5.8 mi) east of The Graves Light at 42°22.212′N 070°45.950′W.

=== 4 August ===
List of shipwrecks: 4 August 1933
Ship	State	Description
Etolin	United States	The 17-gross register ton, 43-foot (13.1 m) fishing vessel sank in Kaasan Bay (55°24′N 132°06′W) in Southeast Alaska. Her crew of five survived.
Marouko Pateras	Greece	The cargo ship ran aground in the Paraná River, Brazil. She was refloated on 9 August.

=== 7 August ===
List of shipwrecks: 7 August 1933
Ship	State	Description
Achill	United Kingdom	The cargo ship foundered in the Baltic Sea (61°28′N 20°57′E). The crew were rescued.

=== 8 August ===
List of shipwrecks: 8 August 1933
Ship	State	Description
Treci	Yugoslavia	The cargo ship ran aground at Šibenik. She was refloated but subsequently sank at 41°03′N 17°54′E. The crew were rescued by Bosanka (Yugoslavia).

=== 11 August ===
List of shipwrecks: 11 August 1933
Ship	State	Description
Osterhav	Finland	The cargo ship ran aground at Lancaster, Lancashire. She was still aground on 15 August.

=== 13 August ===
List of shipwrecks: 13 August 1933
Ship	State	Description
Fernglen	Norway	The cargo ship ran aground 30 nautical miles (56 km) south of Cape Guardafui, Italian Somaliland while on a voyage from Macassar, Netherlands East Indies to Aarhus, Denmark. She was refloated on 8 November. Subsequently repaired and returned to service.

=== 14 August ===
List of shipwrecks: 14 August 1933
Ship	State	Description
Edith Rosselmann	Danzig	The cargo ship ran aground at Bridgwater, Somerset, United Kingdom.
Montaigne	France	The cargo ship ran aground in the Saloum River, French West Africa. She was refloated on 19 August.
North Shore	United Kingdom	The coaster came ashore at Pointe des Monts, Quebec, Canada. She was refloated on 20 August.

=== 15 August ===
List of shipwrecks: 15 August 1933
Ship	State	Description
Edith Belliveau	United Kingdom	The schooner was wrecked on South Caicos. She was refloated on 18 August.
Faith Robey	United Kingdom	The Thames barge sank in the Thames Estuary. The crew were rescued by Bruarfoss (Iceland).
Netherton	United Kingdom	The schooner came ashore on Saint Pierre Island, St. Pierre and Miquelon. She was refloated on 19 August severely damaged.

=== 16 August ===
List of shipwrecks: 16 August 1933
Ship	State	Description
Josie	United States	While no one was aboard, the 18-gross register ton, 41.5-foot (12.6 m) fishing vessel was destroyed by fire at Karheen (55°48′45″N 133°18′35″W), Territory of Alaska.

=== 20 August ===
List of shipwrecks: 20 August 1933
Ship	State	Description
Tokai Maru	Japan	The Kenai Maru-class cargo ship (8,365 GRT, 1933) ran aground at Kirun harbor's entrance, off the lighthouse. Refloated the next day with some hull cracking.

=== 22 August ===
List of shipwrecks: 22 August 1933
Ship	State	Description
Abyssinia	France	The ship sank at Port Sall.

=== 23 August ===
List of shipwrecks: 23 August 1933
Ship	State	Description
Carolina	Sweden	The cargo ship ran aground in the Paraná River, Argentina. She was refloated on 2 September.
Terneuzen	United Kingdom	The cargo ship ran aground at Leningrad, Soviet Union. She was refloated on 30 August.

=== 24 August ===
List of shipwrecks: 24 August 1933
Ship	State	Description
Agnes	United States	The 9-gross register ton, 36.7-foot (11.2 m) fishing vessel sank at Todd (57°27′40″N 135°02′30″W) in Southeast Alaska. All four people aboard survived.
City of Norfolk	United States	1933 Chesapeake–Potomac hurricane: The passenger ship was driven ashore in the Chesapeake Bay. She was refloated on 24 September.
Examelia	United States	1933 Chesapeake–Potomac hurricane: The cargo liner was driven ashore at Norfolk, Virginia. She was refloated on 28 August.
G. A. Kohler	United States	1933 Chesapeake–Potomac hurricane: The four-masted schooner was driven ashore at Virginia Beach, Virginia. All nineteen crew were rescued by breeches buoy.

=== 25 August ===
List of shipwrecks: 25 August 1933
Ship	State	Description
Roussalka	United Kingdom	The motor yacht was wrecked on Blood Slate Rock, Freaklin Island, Killary Bay, Ireland. All passengers and crew were rescued.

=== 26 August ===
List of shipwrecks: 26 August 1933
Ship	State	Description
Lady Gwynfred	United Kingdom	The Thames barge collided with Starling (United Kingdom) and sank at Blackwall, London. She was later raised and beached at Cubitt Town.

=== 27 August ===
List of shipwrecks: 27 August 1933
Ship	State	Description
Honora	Argentina	The 140.1-foot (42.7 m), 394-ton steam trawler was wrecked near Maldonado, Uruguay, in the Uruguay River of the River Plate estuary.

=== 31 August ===
List of shipwrecks: 31 August 1933
Ship	State	Description
Glory	Nicaragua	The auxiliary four-master schooner foundered in the Atlantic Ocean off Cape Hatteras, North Carolina with the loss of all nine crew.
Rita	United Kingdom	The schooner sank off Red Island, Newfoundland.

== September ==
=== 1 September ===
List of shipwrecks: 1 September 1933
Ship	State	Description
Humanitas	Italy	1933 Cuba-Brownsville hurricane: The cargo ship was driven inshore and stranded at Cárdenas, Cuba. She was refloated on 19 December.
Josephine Gray	United Kingdom	1933 Cuba-Brownsville hurricane: The cargo ship was driven ashore at Cayo Bahia de Cadiz, Cuba. She was refloated on 20 September.
Villa	Cuban Revolutionary Navy	1933 Cuba-Brownsville hurricane: The gunboat foundered at Sagua la Grande along with seven other vessels.

=== 2 September ===
List of shipwrecks: 2 September 1933
Ship	State	Description
Coldwater	United States	The cargo ship collided with President Coolidge (United States) in the Atlantic Ocean 80 nautical miles (150 km) south of Cape Hatteras, North Carolina. She caught fire and sank. All 36 people aboard were rescued by President Coolidge.

=== 6 September ===
List of shipwrecks: 6 September 1933
Ship	State	Description
Archon	Greece	The cargo ship collided with Treherbert (United Kingdom) in the North Sea 8 nautical miles (15 km) off Margate, Kent, United Kingdom and sank. All 24 crew were rescued by Dynamo (United Kingdom).
Elizabeth	United States	The cargo ship ran aground 16 nautical miles (30 km) north of the Jupiter Lighthouse, Florida. She was refloated on 9 October.

=== 10 September ===
List of shipwrecks: 10 September 1933
Ship	State	Description
Dorin	United Kingdom	The auxiliary three-masted schooner departed Nassau, Bahamas for Halifax, Nova Scotia, Canada. No further trace, presumed foundered in the Atlantic Ocean with the loss of all hands.
Echanau	Spain	The cargo ship collided with Romeu ( Spain) in the Atlantic Ocean off Leixões, Portugal and sank with the loss of thirteen of her nineteen crew.
Kinnika	Estonia	The cargo ship ran aground in the Kara Strait. She was abandoned on 19 September. The crew were rescued by Sulev (Soviet Union).
Kurogane Maru	Japan	The cargo ship capsized at Matsushima, Miyagi while being loaded with coal. Four lives were lost. She was refloated on 25 October.

=== 11 September ===
List of shipwrecks: 11 September 1933
Ship	State	Description
Anastasios Petroutsis	Greece	The cargo ship ran aground east of Ochakiv, Soviet Union. She was refloated on 22 September.
Carlo	Italy	The cargo ship foundered in the Tyrrhenian Sea 15 nautical miles (28 km) north of Capo Ferro. The crew were rescued by Staffordshire (United Kingdom).

=== 14 September ===
List of shipwrecks: 14 September 1933
Ship	State	Description
Alexander Bond	United States	The auxiliary schooner caught fire in Chesapeake Bay and sank.
Cetatea Alba	Romania	The passenger ship collided with the lighter C.S.D. (Romania) in the Danube at Brăila and was beached.

=== 15 September ===
List of shipwrecks: 15 September 1933
Ship	State	Description
Porthcawl	United Kingdom	The cargo ship caught fire in the North Sea and was beached off Caister-on-Sea, Norfolk. She was a total loss.
Sebastopol	Canada	The trawler, built in 1918 as a Navarin-class minesweeper for the French Navy, ran aground and was wrecked off Cape St. Francis.

=== 16 September ===
List of shipwrecks: 16 September 1933
Ship	State	Description
Ido	Sweden	The auxiliary schooner was abandoned off Westervik with the loss of two crew. She was subsequently towed into Kalmar.

=== 17 September ===
List of shipwrecks: 17 September 1933
Ship	State	Description
Alix	Norway	The cargo ship collided with Malmoe (Denmark) off Malmö, Sweden and sank. All seventeen crew were rescued by Malmoe. One of Malmoe's 400 passengers was reported to be missing.
Magyar	Hungary	The cargo ship foundered in the Atlantic Ocean 70 nautical miles (130 km) south west of Porto, Portugal (39°53′N 9°33′W). All crew were rescued by British Hope (United Kingdom).

=== 18 September ===
For the scuttling of the Reichsmarine barque Niobe on this day, see the entry for 26 July 1932

List of shipwrecks: 18 September 1933
Ship	State	Description
Riol	Germany	The cargo ship ran aground in the Pánuco River, Mexico. She was refloated on 22 September.

=== 20 September ===
List of shipwrecks: 20 September 1933
Ship	State	Description
Nossa Senhora da Lapa	Portugal	The three-masted schooner caught fire in the Atlantic Ocean (36°39′N 7°52′W) and sank. The crew were rescued by Carterside (United Kingdom).

=== 21 September ===
List of shipwrecks: 21 September 1933
Ship	State	Description
El Mirlo	United Kingdom	The tanker was driven aground in the Pánuco River, Mexico during a hurricane. She was refloated on 25 September.
Papa Ignazio S	Italy	The barque struck the breakwater at Vegliaia and sank. The crew survived.

=== 22 September ===
List of shipwrecks: 22 September 1933
Ship	State	Description
Mourne	United Kingdom	The coaster foundered in the English Channel 6 nautical miles (11 km) south east of St Anthony's Lighthouse, Cornwall. The crew survived.

=== 23 September ===
List of shipwrecks: 23 September 1933
Ship	State	Description
Hirundo	Norway	The cargo liner ran aground on Ko Sichang, Thailand. Passengers were taken off by Kwangchow (United Kingdom). She was declared a constructive total loss on 2 November.
Mary J	United States	The 9-gross register ton, 36-foot (11.0 m) fishing vessel sank near Sitka, Territory of Alaska. The only person aboard survived.

=== 24 September ===
List of shipwrecks: 24 September 1933
Ship	State	Description
Panuco	United States	1933 Tampico hurricane: The ocean liner was driven ashore at Tampico, Mexico, in a hurricane. She was refloated on 8 October.

=== 27 September ===
List of shipwrecks: 27 September 1933
Ship	State	Description
Yvonne	Panama	The cargo ship ran aground at Heraklion, Crete, Greece. She was refloated on 2 October.

=== 30 September ===
List of shipwrecks: 30 September 1933
Ship	State	Description
Kongedybet	Denmark	The auxiliary four-masted schooner collided with Scanmail (United States) in the Baltic Sea off Utklippan, Sweden and sank. The crew were rescued by Scanmail.

== October ==
=== 1 October ===
List of shipwrecks: 1 October 1933
Ship	State	Description
Andromeda	Latvia	The cargo ship sank in the English Channel 80 nautical miles (150 km) north west of Brest, Finistère, France with the loss of one of her 21 crew. Survivors were rescued by Hartside (United Kingdom).
Moorwood	United Kingdom	The cargo ship ran aground off Ouessant, Finistère, France. She was abandoned as a total loss, the crew were rescued by Seefalke (Germany).

=== 3 October ===
List of shipwrecks: 3 October 1933
Ship	State	Description
Alexandra	Greece	The cargo ship struck a submerged object off Burghaz, Romania and was consequently beached. She was refloated on 6 October.

=== 4 October ===
List of shipwrecks: 4 October 1933
Ship	State	Description
Roholm	Norway	The cargo ship caught fire in the Arctic Sea 25 nautical miles (46 km) west of Svyatoy Nos, Soviet Union. She was declared a total loss. The crew were rescued by Gunda (Norway).
Valdivia	Chile	The passenger ship ran aground at Punta Grande. She was declared a total loss. All aboard except two passengers were rescued.

=== 6 October ===
List of shipwrecks: 6 October 1933
Ship	State	Description
Swan	United States	The 12-gross register ton, 36-foot (11 m) fishing vessel sank off Black Island off the coast of the Territory of Alaska. Her four-man crew survived.

=== 8 October ===
List of shipwrecks: 8 October 1933
Ship	State	Description
Visitor	United States	The 13-gross register ton, 39.1-foot (11.9 m) motor vessel burned at Hamilton, Territory of Alaska. All three people aboard survived.

=== 9 October ===
List of shipwrecks: 9 October 1933
Ship	State	Description
Mina E. Tricoglu	Greece	The cargo ship ran aground at Civitavecchia, Rome. She was refloated on 15 October.

=== 10 October ===
List of shipwrecks: 10 October 1933
Ship	State	Description
Annoula	Greece	The cargo ship foundered in the Atlantic Ocean (34°30′N 66°40′W) with the loss of 21 of her 26 crew. Survivors were rescued by Montello (Italy).
Clara Paolinelli	Italy	The brig foundered in the Tyrrhenian Sea off Ansedonia, Tuscany. The crew survived.

=== 12 October ===
List of shipwrecks: 12 October 1933
Ship	State	Description
USCGC CG-256	United States Coast Guard	The cutter was wrecked, circumstances unknown.
Villa Selgas	Spain	The 81-year-old iron cargo ship sprang a leak and foundered in the Bay of Biscay off Ribadesella, Asturias; the crew of twelve were rescued
Wega	Germany	The three-masted schooner ran aground on Skagen, Denmark and was abandoned.

=== 13 October ===
List of shipwrecks: 13 October 1933
Ship	State	Description
Good Hope	United States	The 14-ton motor vessel was wrecked on Shishmaref Shoals (58°24′20″N 157°31′15″W), 10 nautical miles (19 km; 12 mi) north of Cape Prince of Wales on the coast of the Territory of Alaska, with the loss of all eight people aboard – four crewmen and a man and three women aboard as passengers.
Haugland	Norway	The trawler suffered a broken propeller shaft and lost her anchors in a gale on 12 October. Despite the best efforts of the British trawlers to tow her she went ashore on the Murman coast the next day. All 29 crew were taken off by Goth (United Kingdom). Later refloated, repaired, and returned to service.

=== 17 October ===
List of shipwrecks: 17 October 1933
Ship	State	Description
City of Paris	United Kingdom	The ocean liner ran aground in the Mediterranean Sea off the Saraman Lighthouse, France. She was refloated the next day.
Willesden	United Kingdom	The cargo ship ran aground in the Black Sea 6 nautical miles (11 km) east of the Dzharylgach Lighthouse, Soviet Union. She was refloated on 27 October.

=== 18 October ===
List of shipwrecks: 18 October 1933
Ship	State	Description
Alfonso Fierro	Spain	The cargo ship ran aground off Cape Tourinana and was abandoned. She refloated and subsequently foundered in the Bay of Biscay off Punta Casinadura.

=== 19 October ===
List of shipwrecks: 19 October 1933
Ship	State	Description
Cross Sound	United States	The 7.53-gross register ton motor vessel ran aground on a shoal and sank in about 36 feet (11 m) of water near Francis Anchorage (57°09′N 133°10′W) in Farragut Bay (57.1188889°N 133.2305556°W) in Southeast Alaska. Her crew of two survived. An effort by the motor vessel Urania (United States) to refloat her failed due to the depth of the water and the quantity of sand in her wreck.

=== 20 October ===
List of shipwrecks: 20 October 1933
Ship	State	Description
Oaklands	Finland	The barque ran aground on Ven, Sweden. She was refloated on 1 November and found to be severely damaged.
Yashima Maru	Japan	The coaster caught fire and foundered in the Japan Inland Sea off Kobe with the loss of 70 of the 117 people aboard, or sank at Suma Beach, about one nautical mile (1.9 km; 1.2 mi) of the Myohoji River in a typhoon with the loss of 67 lives. On 3 June 1939 she was towed to Kobe while still submerged and refloated on 6 June. Repairs finished in April 1940.

=== 22 October ===
List of shipwrecks: 22 October 1933
Ship	State	Description
Tronoh	United Kingdom	The coaster foundered off Singapore with the loss of 46 lives.

=== 23 October ===
List of shipwrecks: 23 October 1933
Ship	State	Description
Baron Newlands	United Kingdom	The cargo ship ran aground on the Plana Cays, Bahamas. She was refloated on 27 October.
Granero	Norway	The cargo ship came ashore at Cawton, Aberdeenshire, United Kingdom. All eleven crew were rescued by breeches buoy. She was declared a total loss on 27 October.
Jolo	United States	The cargo ship ran aground north of Cebu, Philippines. She was damaged by a typhoon on 3 November and was a total loss.

=== 24 October ===
List of shipwrecks: 24 October 1933
Ship	State	Description
Agnes J. Myra	United Kingdom	The schooner, which had departed from George Town, Bahamas for Saint Pierre and Miquelon, reported her position by radio. No further trace, presumed foundered with the loss of all hands.
USS Chicago	United States Navy	The Northampton-class cruiser collided with Silverpalm (United Kingdom) in the Pacific Ocean 100 nautical miles (190 km) south of San Francisco, California. Both vessels were severely damaged. Chicago had two crew killed and two seriously injured.

=== 26 October ===
List of shipwrecks: 26 October 1933
Ship	State	Description
Kaloudo	Greece	The cargo ship ran aground at Panomi Point. She was refloated on 30 October.

=== 29 October ===
List of shipwrecks: 29 October 1933
Ship	State	Description
Architect	United Kingdom	The cargo liner ran aground at Liverpool, Lancashire. She was refloated the same day but was beached again. She broke in two and was a total loss.
Portland	Spain	The cargo ship foundered in the Atlantic Ocean off Porto, Portugal. The crew were rescued by Malatian (United Kingdom).

=== 31 October ===
List of shipwrecks: 31 October 1933
Ship	State	Description
Alice Gaulke	Panama	The cargo ship ran aground on Gotska Sandön, Sweden and was a total loss. The crew survived.
Arno	United Kingdom	The auxiliary schooner came ashore in Montego Bay, Jamaica and was abandoned.
Dagmar	Sweden	The cargo ship was driven ashore at Smoejen, Gotland and was a total loss.
Elin	Sweden	The schooner was driven ashore at Smoejen and was a total loss.
Martin	Latvia	The coaster ran aground at Rhyl, Denbighshire, United Kingdom. She was still aground on 3 November with refloating not expected before 17 November.

== November ==
=== 2 November ===
List of shipwrecks: 2 November 1933
Ship	State	Description
Marion McLoon	United Kingdom	The auxiliary sailing vessel sank at Port aux Basques, Newfoundland.

=== 3 November ===
List of shipwrecks: 3 November 1933
Ship	State	Description
Marcel	Belgium	The cargo ship ran aground off the Llanelli Lighthouse, Glamorgan, Wales. She broke her back and was declared a constructive total loss. She was refloated on 3 January 1934 and towed to Llanelli where she was scrapped.

=== 4 November ===
List of shipwrecks: 4 November 1933
Ship	State	Description
Berea	United Kingdom	The whaler communicated with Tafelburg (United Kingdom) while on her way from Cape Town, South Africa to the Antarctic. No further trace, presumed foundered with the loss of all hands.

=== 5 November ===
List of shipwrecks: 5 November 1933
Ship	State	Description
Bolivar	Panama	The cargo ship ran aground at Douala, French Cameroun. She was refloated on 8 November.

=== 7 November ===
List of shipwrecks: 7 November 1933
Ship	State	Description
Nova V	flag unknown	The auxiliary sailing ship ran aground on Seal Island, Nova Scotia, Canada. She caught fire and was a total loss.
Wajao	United Kingdom	The coaster was wrecked in the Agalega Islands during a cyclone.

=== 8 November ===
List of shipwrecks: 8 November 1933
Ship	State	Description
Heian Maru	Japan	The cargo ship sprang a leak in the South China Sea (approximately 17°N 119°E). She was abandoned by her crew in a sinking condition. She came ashore at the Cape Bolinao Lighthouse, Philippines. Heian Maru was subsequently declared a total loss.

=== 10 November ===
List of shipwrecks: 10 November 1933
Ship	State	Description
T. S. Christie	United States	The cargo ship ran aground at Manistee, Michigan and was a total loss.

=== 11 November ===
List of shipwrecks: 11 November 1933
Ship	State	Description
Munargo	United States	The cargo ship collided with Deutschland (Germany) in New York Harbor. She was severely damaged and was beached north of Bedloe's Island. She was refloated on 18 November.

=== 12 November ===
List of shipwrecks: 12 November 1933
Ship	State	Description
Susaa	Denmark	The cargo ship came ashore at Heath Point, Quebec, Canada and sank.

=== 14 November ===
List of shipwrecks: 14 November 1933
Ship	State	Description
Johanne	Denmark	The cargo ship ran aground at Kirkkonummi, Finland. She was refloated on 20 November but was found to have sustained extensive damage.

=== 15 November ===
List of shipwrecks: 15 November 1933
Ship	State	Description
D. E. Callender	United States	The cargo ship ran aground on the north shore of Lake Erie. She was refloated on 20 November.
Florence	United Kingdom	The tug foundered in Lake Ontario. The crew were rescued.
Saxilby	United Kingdom	The cargo ship foundered in the Atlantic Ocean 400 nautical miles (740 km) off Valencia, Spain (49°07′N 22°30′W) with the loss of all 27 crew.

=== 16 November ===
List of shipwrecks: 16 November 1933
Ship	State	Description
Svanen	Denmark	The auxiliary schooner ran aground at Wexford, Ireland. All nine people aboard were rescued by the Rosslare Harbour Lifeboat.

=== 17 November ===
List of shipwrecks: 17 November 1933
Ship	State	Description
Dusan Silni	Yugoslavia	The cargo ship ran aground in the Paraná River at Rosario, Santa Fe, Argentina. She was refloated on 24 November.
Suemez	United States	The 26-gross register ton, 41.7-foot (12.7 m) fishing vessel was destroyed by fire at Waterfall, Territory of Alaska.

=== 18 November ===
List of shipwrecks: 18 November 1933
Ship	State	Description
Imarta	United States	The 8-gross register ton, 34.4-foot (10.5 m) fishing vessel was destroyed by fire at Ketchikan, Territory of Alaska. The two people aboard survived.
Pennyworth	United Kingdom	The cargo ship ran aground on the Île d'Orléans in the St Lawrence River. Salvage efforts were abandoned until the following spring.

=== 19 November ===
List of shipwrecks: 19 November 1933
Ship	State	Description
Arrow	United States	The 20-gross register ton, 40.1-foot (12.2 m) fishing vessel was destroyed by fire at Craig, Territory of Alaska. Her crew of five survived.

=== 20 November ===
List of shipwrecks: 20 November 1933
Ship	State	Description
Carl	Denmark	The coaster ran aground in the Åbenrå Fjord. She was refloated on 23 November.
Goldcrown	United Kingdom	The coaster came ashore at East Runton, Norfolk. The crew were rescued by H F Bailey III ( Royal National Lifeboat Institution). She was refloated on 29 November.

=== 22 November ===
List of shipwrecks: 22 November 1933
Ship	State	Description
Freda M. Himmelmann	United Kingdom	The auxiliary schooner came ashore at Black Duck Brook, Dominion of Newfoundland and was a total loss.
Von Horter	Reichsmarine	The torpedo boat collided with Jamaique (France) off Saint-Nazaire, Loire Atlantique, France and sank.

=== 23 November ===
List of shipwrecks: 23 November 1933
Ship	State	Description
Jamaica Progress	United Kingdom	The refrigerated cargo ship caught fire in the East India Docks, London. She was taken into the River Thames for firefighting operations and consequently sank due to the amount of water pumped aboard while fighting the fire.
Ohioan	United States	The cargo ship collided with Liberty (United States) in the Ambrose Channel and was beached near the West Bank Lighthouse. She was refloated on 26 November.

=== 24 November ===
List of shipwrecks: 24 November 1933
Ship	State	Description
Naval	Germany	The cargo ship ran aground near Juodkrantė, Lithuania. The crew were rescued. She was refloated on 27 November and taken to Memel.

=== 26 November ===
List of shipwrecks: 26 November 1933
Ship	State	Description
Douglas E. Parks	United Kingdom	The auxiliary schooner was abandoned off Forchu, Nova Scotia, Canada.
Mynonie R. Kirby	United Kingdom	The schooner was dismasted in the Atlantic Ocean 60 nautical miles (110 km) west of Ouessant, Finistère, France. She was taken in tow by Star of Ramleh (Egypt) but the tow parted off the Wolf Rock. The six crew and a dog were rescued by the St Mary's Lifeboat on 28 December. the derelict Mynonie R. Kirby was reported at 50°08′N 8°06′W on 4 December in a sinking condition.

=== 27 November ===
List of shipwrecks: 27 November 1933
Ship	State	Description
Diana	Sweden	The three-masted auxiliary schooner came ashore at Lofstaoukten and was wrecked.
Ning Ching	China	The cargo ship ran aground on Collinson Island. She was refloated on 12 December.

=== 28 November ===
List of shipwrecks: 28 November 1933
Ship	State	Description
Fernanda	Portugal	The auxiliary three-masted schooner sprang a leak and was abandoned in the Atlantic Ocean (41°40′N 9°25′W). The crew were rescued by Ange Schiaffino (France). Fernanda was towed into Vigo, Spain by Signe (Denmark).
Polzella	United Kingdom	The cargo ship was driven against the quayside at Novorissiysk, Soviet Union and was consequently beached.
Thelma	United States	The 7-gross register ton, 30.1-foot (9.2 m) fishing vessel sank off Cape Muzon Light in Southeast Alaska with the loss of one life.

=== 29 November ===
List of shipwrecks: 29 November 1933
Ship	State	Description
Gerze	Turkey	The cargo ship was driven ashore at Amasta. She was refloated on 19 December.

=== 30 November ===
List of shipwrecks: 30 November 1933
Ship	State	Description
Anakri	Soviet Union	The sailing ship foundered in the Black Sea off Ordou after losing her tow in a gale.
Gelendjik	Soviet Union	The tug, which had been towing Anakri (Soviet Union) was driven ashore at Ordou and was wrecked with the loss of seven crew.

== December ==
=== 1 December ===
List of shipwrecks: 1 December 1933
Ship	State	Description
Sellinge	United Kingdom	The cargo ship ran aground on the La Banche Rocks at the mouth of the Loire (47°14′N 2°30′W). She was abandoned and declared a total loss.

=== 2 December ===
List of shipwrecks: 2 December 1933
Ship	State	Description
Arethusa	Panama	The coaster ran aground in the Uruguay River. She was refloated on 7 December.
Byzantion	Greece	The cargo ship sank in the Mediterranean Sea while under tow.
Gloria	Spain	The cargo ship sprang a leak and foundered in Cardigan Bay (52°36′N 5°29′W). All 26 crew were rescued by Deebank (United Kingdom).
Zorozza	Spain	The tanker ran aground at Istanbul, Turkey. She was refloated on 23 January 1934.

=== 4 December ===
List of shipwrecks: 4 December 1933
Ship	State	Description
Agate	United Kingdom	The coaster ran aground at Skerries, County Dublin, Ireland. The crew were rescued.
Edward VII	United Kingdom	The schooner was abandoned in the Atlantic Ocean (43°10′N 48°50′W). The crew were rescued by Maine (Denmark).

=== 5 December ===
List of shipwrecks: 5 December 1933
Ship	State	Description
Agamemnon	Greece	The cargo ship ran aground in the Black Sea 3 nautical miles (5.6 km) south of Cape Shableh, Romania and was a total loss. The crew were rescued by King Lear (United Kingdom).
Constance	United Kingdom	The coaster ran aground at Montrose, Angus. The crew were rescued by lifeboat.
Gazelle	United States	With no one aboard, the 9-gross register ton, 32.4-foot (9.9 m) fishing vessel was wrecked at Juneau, Territory of Alaska.

=== 7 December ===
List of shipwrecks: 7 December 1933
Ship	State	Description
Volos	Greece	The cargo ship sprang a leak and sank in the Mediterranean Sea (37°55′N 19°25′E).

=== 8 December ===
List of shipwrecks: 8 December 1933
Ship	State	Description
A.H.S.	United Kingdom	The schooner was wrecked in Jamaican waters.
Nevada	France	The cargo ship caught fire at Dunkerque, Nord and was sunk to extinguish the fire.

=== 9 December ===
List of shipwrecks: 9 December 1933
Ship	State	Description
Admiral Gove	United States	World War II: The USSB Type 1023 cargo ship ra aground near Bay Point buoy No. 2 near Pittsburg, California. Refloated on 11 December, but laid up until early 1934.
Fernmoor	United Kingdom	The cargo ship ran aground near Cape Anguille, Newfoundland and was wrecked. The crew were rescued by Foundation Franklin (United Kingdom).

=== 10 December ===
List of shipwrecks: 10 December 1933
Ship	State	Description
Elsa	France	The schooner departed Cardiff, Glamorgan, United Kingdom for Concarneau, Finistère. No further trace, presumed foundered with the loss of all hands.
R. H. Sanders	Sweden	The ship caught fire off Cap St. Tropez, France and was abandoned. All passengers and crew were rescued by Livorno (Germany). The burning derelict was towed into the Gulf of St Tropez by a French fishing boat and was beached.
Ruth	Sweden	The auxiliary three-masted schooner ran aground at Skanör, Scania. She was a total loss.

=== 12 December ===
List of shipwrecks: 12 December 1933
Ship	State	Description
Qui Vive	United Kingdom	The schooner was driven ashore on the east coast of Canada and was a total loss.

=== 13 December ===
List of shipwrecks: 13 December 1933
Ship	State	Description
Appin	United Kingdom	The coaster was driven ashore at Carnalea, County Antrim. The crew were rescued.
Broomfleet	United Kingdom	The coaster foundered in the North Sea off the coast of Norfolk with the loss of all thirteen crew.
Culmore	United Kingdom	The coaster foundered in the North Sea off Shingle Street, Suffolk with the loss of all twelve crew.
Glenway	United Kingdom	The Thames barge came ashore at Happisburgh, Norfolk. The three crew were rescued by H F Bailey III ( Royal National Lifeboat Institution.
Mazorca	Peru	The tanker arrived at Istanbul, Turkey with severe weather damage. She was consequently declared beyond economic repair.
Plus	Finland	The 232.9-foot (71.0 m), 1,254-ton barque, grounded and sank in the Åland Islands. Her captain and 12 crew were killed, and there were 4 survivors.

=== 15 December ===
List of shipwrecks: 15 December 1933
Ship	State	Description
Adams	United States	The schooner was abandoned in the Atlantic Ocean off Bermuda with the loss of a crew member. Survivors were rescued by Blairesk (United Kingdom).
Lotus	Netherlands	The auxiliary sailing ship collided with the quayside at Gefle, Sweden and sank.

=== 16 December ===
List of shipwrecks: 16 December 1933
Ship	State	Description
Ellen T. Marshall	flag unknown	The schooner caught fire in the Atlantic Ocean (43°11′N 65°49′W) and was abandoned by her 26 crew. Eight of them were rescued by Lars Kruse (Denmark); the others were reported to be making for Seal Island, Nova Scotia, Canada.
Exarch	United States	The cargo ship ran aground at Cape Plakoti, Cyprus. Her captain committed suicide the next day. She was refloated on 17 January 1934.
Madonna	United Kingdom	The schooner was damaged by ice and consequently beached at Trepassey, Newfoundland.
Nilos	Greece	The cargo ship ran aground off Constanţa, Romania. She was refloated on 27 December.

=== 17 December ===
List of shipwrecks: 17 December 1933
Ship	State	Description
Charles L. Wheeler Jr.	United States	The cargo ship ran aground on Sand Island in the Columbia River. She was refloated on 30 December.

=== 18 December ===
List of shipwrecks: 18 December 1933
Ship	State	Description
Ben Blanche	United Kingdom	The coaster ran aground and sank in the Bristol Channel off Porteynon Point, Glamorgan. All seven crew were rescued by the Mumbles Lifeboat Edward, Prince of Wales ( Royal National Lifeboat Institution).
Charles Jose	Belgium	The coaster ran aground at Slapton Sands, Devon, United Kingdom. Ten of the eleven people aboard were rescued by breeches buoy, with her captain remaining aboard. She was refloated 2 January 1934, repaired and returned to service.
Kasagisan Maru	Japan	The cargo ship ran aground at Nemuro, Hokkaidō. She was refloated on 26 December.
Palmer S	United States	The 8-gross register ton motor vessel was wrecked during a snowstorm and gale at the entrance to Port Chester (55°09′N 131°36′W) on Annette Island in the Gravina Islands of the Alexander Archipelago in Southeast Alaska. The motor vessel Cora (United States) rescued both people who had been aboard.
Undine	United States	While at anchor alongside the barge Griffon (United States) with no one and no cargo aboard, the 9-gross register ton, 33.1-foot (10.1 m) motor vessel broke free from her moorings during a gale and was wrecked on the shore of Green Bay (58°09′15″N 134°16′35″W) in Southeast Alaska.

=== 20 December ===
List of shipwrecks: 20 December 1933
Ship	State	Description
Andrea Lucibello	Italy	The barquentine was wrecked at Porto Lucibello, Sardinia.
Humorist	United Kingdom	The auxiliary schooner was driven ashore at Placentia, Newfoundland and was a total loss.
Matrero	Argentina	The cargo ship was driven ashore at Río Gallegos, Santa Cruz and was a total loss.

=== 21 December ===
List of shipwrecks: 21 December 1933
Ship	State	Description
Prince George	United Kingdom	The passenger ship struck a rock in the Portland Canal and ran aground. All 80 passengers and crew were taken off. She was refloated the next day.

=== 22 December ===
List of shipwrecks: 22 December 1933
Ship	State	Description
Fridtjof Nansen	Royal Norwegian Navy	The patrol vessel ran aground and sank in Vestervågen. She was raised in 1934, repaired and returned to service.
Juno	Germany	The cargo ship collided with Sveti Vlaho (Yugoslavia) at Rotterdam, Netherlands and was beached.

=== 23 December ===
List of shipwrecks: 23 December 1933
Ship	State	Description
Mount Taygetus	Panama	The cargo ship ran aground at Memphis Rock, English Narrows, Straits of Magellan. She was refloated on 4 January 1934. Mount Taygetus was sold for scrap in 1935.

=== 24 December ===
List of shipwrecks: 24 December 1933
Ship	State	Description
Cymric	Ireland	The schooner ran aground in Wexford Harbour. She was refloated on 29 December.

=== 25 December ===
List of shipwrecks: 25 December 1933
Ship	State	Description
Aquitaine	France	The cargo ship was wrecked at Pointe la Coubre, Gironde Estuary.

=== 26 December ===
List of shipwrecks: 26 December 1933
Ship	State	Description
Athos	France	The tug collided with Emanuel Nobel (Belgium) at Rouen, Seine-Inférieure and sank with the loss of two crew members.

=== 27 December ===
List of shipwrecks: 27 December 1933
Ship	State	Description
Angra	Portugal	The cargo ship ran aground north of the mouth of the Douro (41°10′N 8°42′W). All crew were rescued by breeches buoy. The ship was a total loss.

=== 28 December ===
List of shipwrecks: 28 December 1933
Ship	State	Description
Prode	United Kingdom	The cargo ship ran aground off Tripoli, Libya and was beached.
Svanen	Denmark	The auxiliary schooner was in distress in the Irish Sea off Rosslare Harbour, County Wexford, Ireland. All eight crew were rescued by the Rosslare Harbour Lifeboat.

=== 29 December ===
List of shipwrecks: 29 December 1933
Ship	State	Description
Arginia	United Kingdom	The schooner was driven ashore at Lamaline, Newfoundland and was a total loss.

== Unknown date ==
List of shipwrecks: Unknown date 1933
Ship	State	Description
City of Taunton	United States	The 292-foot (89 m) cargo ship, a sidewheel paddle steamer, was beached and abandoned at Somerset, Massachusetts, on the west bank of the Taunton River at 41°42′39″N 071°10′33″W, just south of the future site of the Charles M. Braga Jr. Memorial Bridge, sometime during the 1930s. The wreck settled on the river bottom in very shallow water.
Esther	United States	After falling into disrepair due to her owner's bankruptcy, the three-masted steam schooner, most recently in use as a salmon canning vessel, capsized and sank at her moorings in Uganik Bay (57°50′N 153°32′W) on the coast of Kodiak Island in the Territory of Alaska. Her steam engine was salvaged in 1934.
F. C. Pendleton	United States	The 145-foot (44 m), 408-gross register ton three-masted schooner burned and sank without loss of life in up to 45 feet (14 m) of water at 44°19′38″N 068°54′27″W while at anchor in Seal Harbor at Islesboro, Maine, sometime during the 1930s.
Gardner G. Deering	United States	The 251-foot (77 m), 1,982-gross register ton five-masted schooner was abandoned and later burned in Smith Cove off West Brooksville, Maine, sometime during the 1930s. Her wreck settled in 10 to 30 feet (3.0 to 9.1 m) of water approximately 500 feet (150 m) off the north shore of the cove at 44°22′55″N 068°46′30″W.
Henry Cort	United States	The whaleback steamer was holed by ice and sank at the Nicholson Transit Co. dock in the Detroit River at Ecorse, Michigan sometime in 1933. Later raised.
Mary G	United States	With no one aboard, the 31-gross register ton, 51.4-foot (15.7 m) fishing vessel sank southwest of the Alaska Peninsula near the Shumagin Islands.
San Pasqual	Cuba	The 420-foot (130 m), 6,486-ton, concrete-hulled tanker grounded off Cayo Francés, Cuba. Still aground.
