= Svyatoy Nos =

Svyatoy Nos (Святой Нос 'Holy Cape') is the name of several localities in Russia:

In the Kola Peninsula, Northwest Russia:

- Svyatoy Nos, Murmansk Oblast, a town
- Cape Svyatoy Nos, Murmansk Oblast

In the Lake Baikal, Republic of Buryatia:

- Svyatoy Nos, Buryatia, an administrative division
- Svyatoy Nos Peninsula, Buryatia

In the Nenets Autonomous Okrug, North Russia:

- Cape Svyatoy Nos, Nenets Autonomous Okrug

In the Sakha Republic (Yakutia), North Siberia:

- Cape Svyatoy Nos (Laptev Sea)
