= A. W. Ecclestone =

English architect

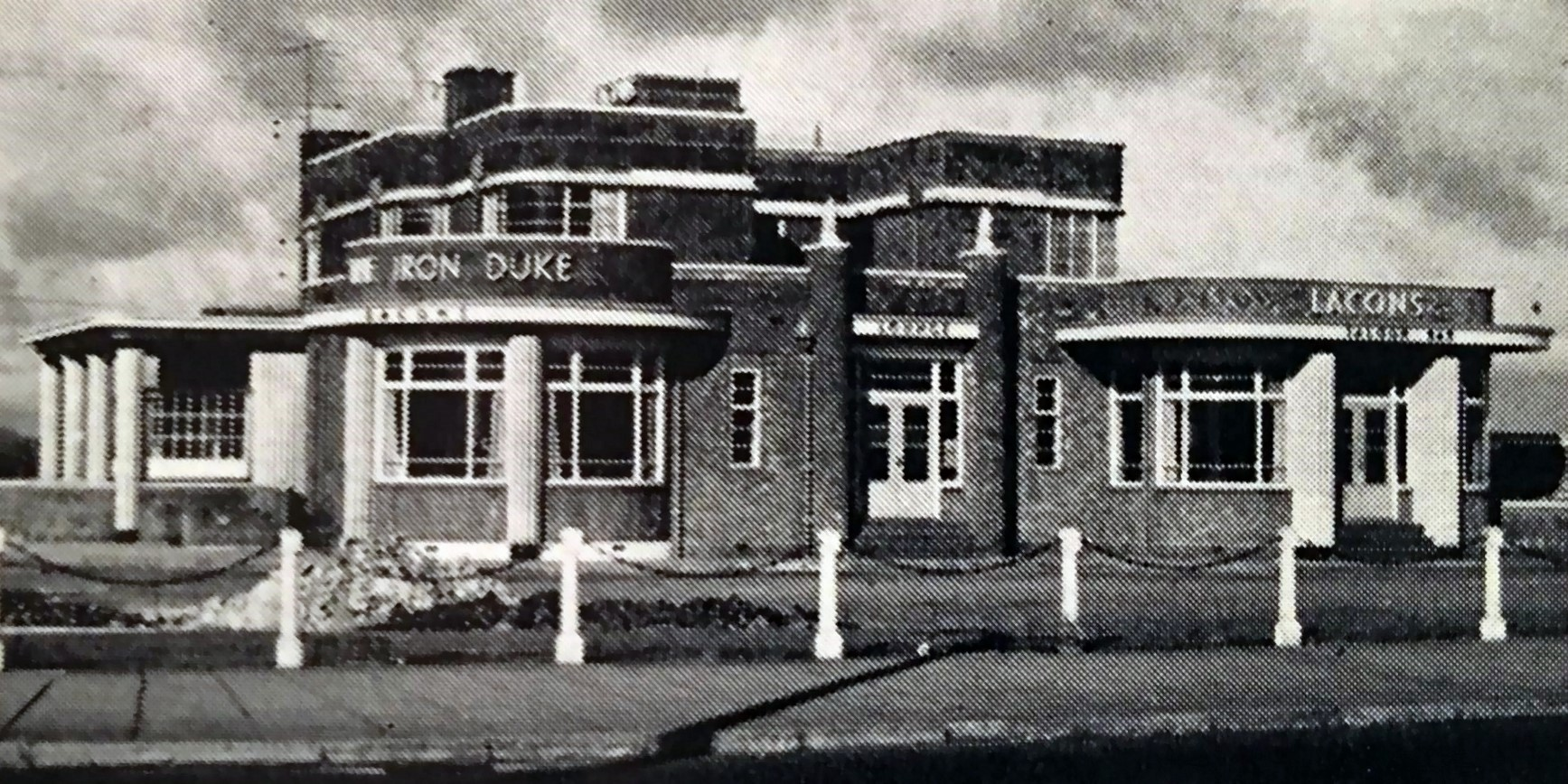
- The Iron Duke, Great Yarmouth, designed by Ecclestone
- Born: Arthur William "Billy" Ecclestone; January 17, 1901; Great Yarmouth, Norfolk, England
- Died: 1984
- Occupation: Architect
- Parent(s): Arthur James Eccleston and Alice Mary Ecclestone
- Practice: Lacons
- Buildings: A number of public houses
- Projects: Clipper Schooner
- Design: Iron Duke

Arthur William "Billy" Ecclestone (7 January 1901 – 1984) was an English architect and the chief surveyor for the Norfolk brewers Lacons in the first half of the twentieth century. In that capacity, he was responsible for the design of a number of their public houses, two of which are now listed buildings with Historic England. He was also a local councillor, justice of the peace, and historian of Great Yarmouth.

== Early life ==
Arthur Ecclestone was born in Great Yarmouth on 7 January 1901 to Arthur James Eccleston and his wife Alice Mary Ecclestone. He was christened at St Nicholas's parish church, Great Yarmouth.

== Career ==
Ecclestone was a member of the Society of Architects and from 1925 a licentiate of the Royal Institute of British Architects. From the 1920s to the 1960s he worked for the Lacons brewery in Great Yarmouth for whom he was the chief surveyor and responsible for their pub designs.

His designs include the Clipper Schooner (1938) in Great Yarmouth with a decorative tiled panel showing a sailing ship that the Tile Gazetteer described as typical of Ecclestone's practice in his modern pub designs; the Iron Duke in Yarmouth (late 1930s, completed 1948); and the Never Turn Back in Caister-on-Sea (1957) which he designed in the Art Deco and Streamline Moderne styles as a memorial to the nine lifeboatmen who died in the Caister lifeboat disaster of 1901. Both the Iron Duke and the Never Turn Back are grade II listed with Historic England.

He also designed the Winter Gardens at Gorleston in 1929 and the Links Hotel in Gorleston, which was demolished in 1999.

Outside work, Ecclestone was a justice of the peace and local councillor.

== Death ==
Ecclestone died in 1984.

== Selected publications ==
Ecclestone was a historian of Great Yarmouth and published a number of articles and books on the town:

=== Articles ===
- "The Victoria Building Company", Yarmouth Archaeology, 1979.
- "The Columbia Fleet and Baroness Coutts", Yarmouth Archaeology, 1983.

=== Books ===
- The Rise of Great Yarmouth. The Story of a Sandbank. A.W. Ecclestone, Great Yarmouth, 1959. (with John Lewis Ecclestone)
- Henry Manship's Great Yarmouth. Great Yarmouth, 1971. (editor)
- A Yarmouth Miscellany. A. W. Ecclestone, Great Yarmouth, 1974. (compiler)
- Yarmouth Haven. A.W. Ecclestone, Great Yarmouth, 1981.
- Great Yarmouth 1886–1936. A. W. Ecclestone, Great Yarmouth.

Gorleston. A.W.Eccleston. pub undated. I have a copy!
