= Never Turn Back =

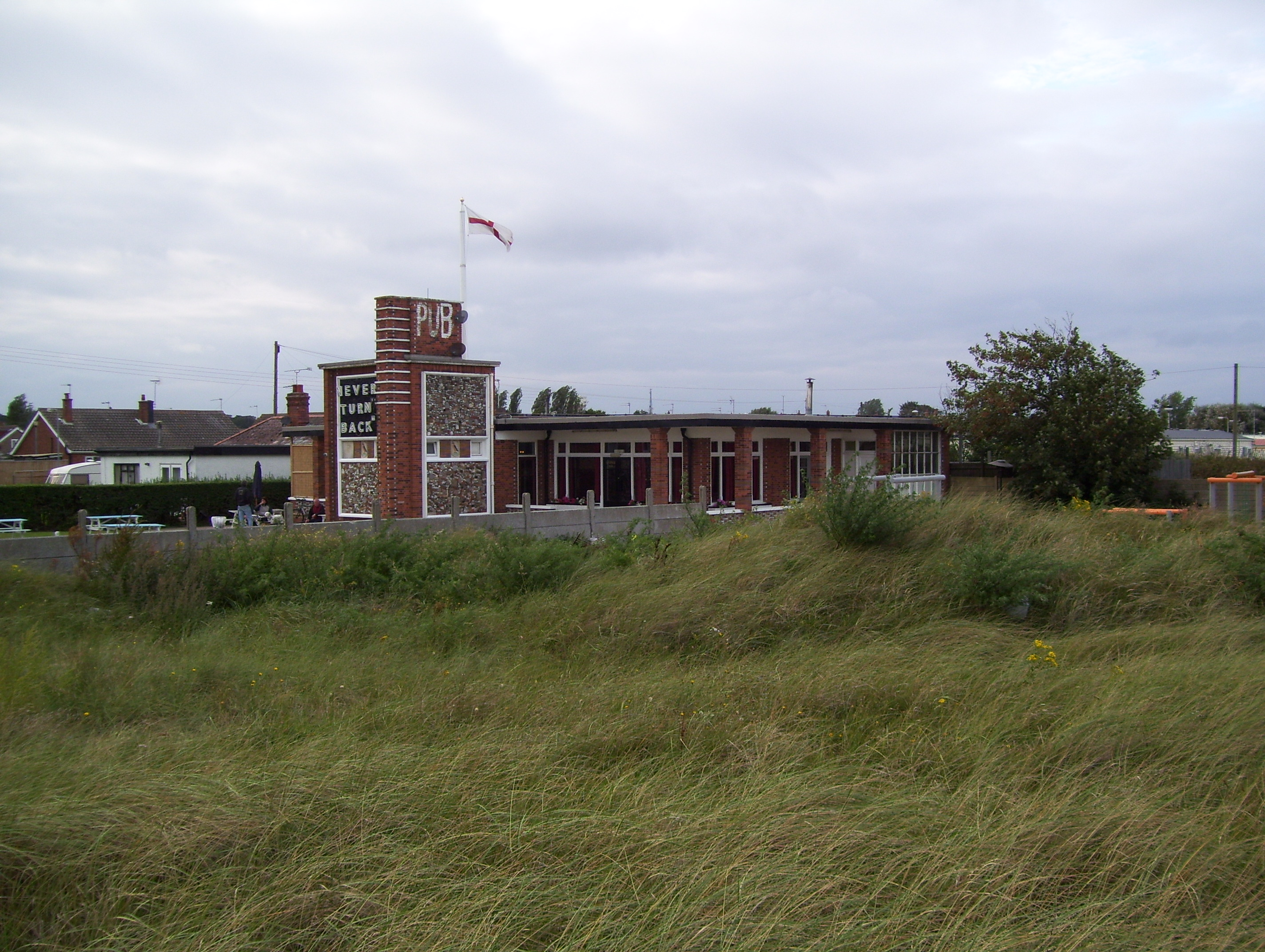

- Location in Norfolk

General information
- Type: Pub
- Location: Never Turn Back; Manor Road; Caister-on-Sea; Great Yarmouth; Norfolk; NR30 5HG
- Coordinates: 52°38′59″N 1°44′00″E
- Completed: 1956
- Opened: 1957

Website
- restaurantwebx.com/NeverTurnBack/

The Never Turn Back is a grade II listed public house in Caister-on-Sea, Norfolk, England. It was designed by A. W. Ecclestone in the Art Deco and Streamline Moderne styles and built in 1956 (opening the following year) as a memorial to the nine lifeboatmen who died in the Caister lifeboat disaster of 1901.

Arthur William "Billy" Ecclestone was chief surveyor of Norfolk brewers Lacons.
