= Svyatoy Nos, Murmansk Oblast =

Svyatoy Nos Святой Нос
- Inhabited locality
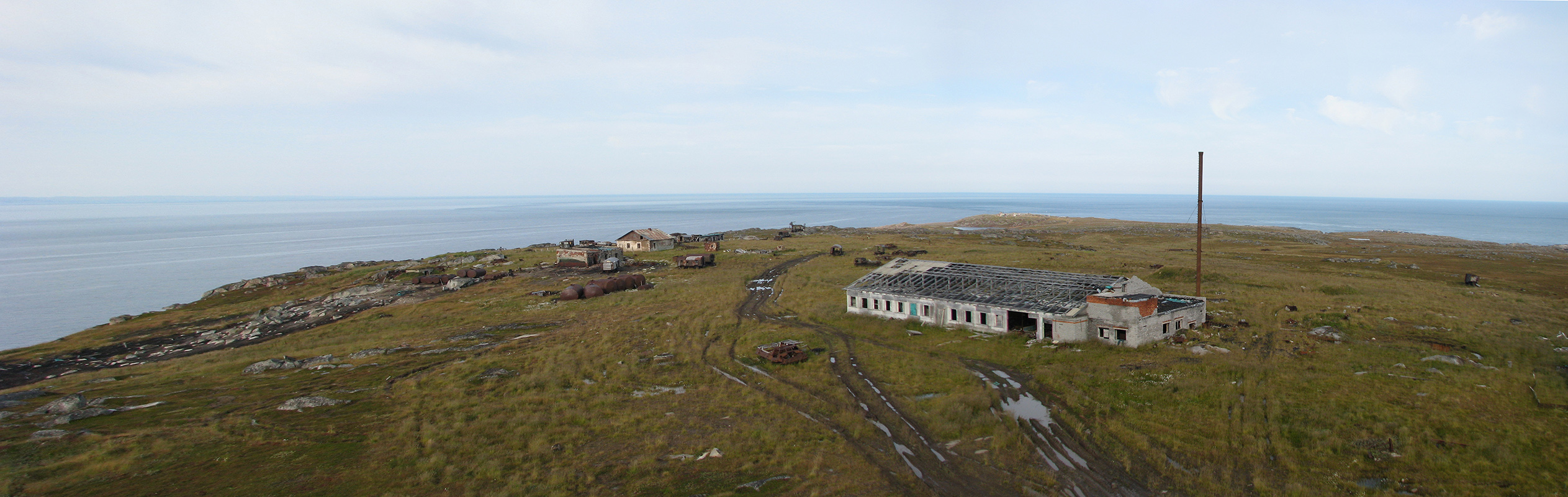
- View of Svyatoy Nos
- Interactive map of Svyatoy Nos
- Location of Svyatoy Nos Svyatoy Nos (Murmansk Oblast)
- Coordinates: 68°08′N 39°46′E
- Country: Russia
- Federal subject: Murmansk Oblast
- Elevation: 11 m (36 ft)

Population (2010 Census)
  - Total: 7
  - Estimate (2021): 0 (−100%)

Administrative status
  - Subordinated to: closed administrative-territorial formation of Ostrovnoy

Municipal status
  - Urban okrug: Ostrovnoy Urban Okrug
- Time zone: UTC+3 (MSK)
- Postal code: 184640
- Dialing code: +7 81558
- OKTMO ID: 47731000121

Svyatoy Nos (Russian: Свято́й Нос) is a rural locality (an inhabited locality) in administrative jurisdiction of the closed administrative-territorial formation of Ostrovnoy in Murmansk Oblast, Russia, located beyond the Arctic Circle on the Kola Peninsula at a height of 11 meters (36 ft) above sea level. As of the 2010 Census, its population was 7. It is close to Svyatonossky Gulf, on Cape Svyatoy Nos.
