= James Haylett =

British lifeboatman (1825–1907)

James Henry Haylett (1825–1907) was one of the most famous lifeboatmen of his age. Decorated by King Edward VII with the RNLI Gold Medal for his efforts in the 1901 Caister lifeboat disaster, which claimed the lives of nine men. Amongst those lost were two of his sons, Aaron and James Haylett, Charles Bonney George (his son in law) and his grandson Harry Knights.

== Early life ==
Haylett was born in 1825 in Winterton-on-Sea, Norfolk, England, the son of Samuel Haylett (1791–1879) and Sarah Sheales (1789–1872). Little is known about his early life, but according to parish records he married Sarah Smith (1825–1897) in August 1844 and went on to father 7 children. Somewhere between 1851 and 1861, he moved a few miles down the Norfolk coast (in common with many other Winterton boatmen and their families) to Caister-on-Sea, where he became a shareholder in the Caister Beach Company. The Beach Company men, of which there were 40, made their living from the sea in whichever manner they could. Part of this work was to salvage vessels stranded on the notorious sands off of the North Norfolk coast and a decision was made collectively by the men to save people before property regardless of the impact this could make on their lucrative salvage fees. Despite this decision they were often looked upon as mercenary. The practicality of these men is perhaps summed up by Hallett in replying to a judge during an inquest, who suggested that the beachmen profited from the "misfortune of others". Haylett replied "No Sir, We profit from their mistakes!". This uncompromising attitude linked to a real knowledge of their waters provided one of the cornerstones for the modern lifeboat service.

== Sinking of the Zephyr ==
Haylett became Assistant Coxswain of the Caister lifeboat. At around midnight on 22 July 1885, the yawl Zephyr was launched to the aid of a stranded schooner on the Lower Barber Sand. On a calm and moonlit night the crew of fifteen were on what they felt was a routine call. Haylett was at the helm and as the yawl neared the Barber he called out "now dear boys, keep a lookout for that old stump", referring to the mast of a stone-laden schooner, the crew of which had been saved by the Caister men some nine years earlier. His warnings came too late however when the yawl's port bow struck the mast and the boat was ripped apart.

Seconds later the whole crew were struggling in the water. They managed to cut free much of the yawl's rigging and masts and this proved to be the salvation of the survivors. Haylett, the coxswain, supported himself on two oars before drifting close by the foremast, on which were his son Aaron, William Knowles and Joseph Haylett. They kept afloat for a time, but the mast kept rolling over in the swell. Aaron moved to his father's oars but William and Joseph were drowned. John George, another of the crew, swam towards the shore and came across a shrimper, The Brothers, of Yarmouth, which then led the search for the other beachmen. First to be picked up was Robert Plummer on a grating, then one after the other, Aaron Haylett, Isaiah Haylett, George Haylett, Harry Russell, and lastly Haylett, still on the foremast with an oar under one arm and a sett under the other. The remaining eight crewmen were drowned. Haylett's son Frederick was amongst the dead.

== 1901 Caister lifeboat disaster ==
Poor weather conditions on 13 November contributed to the disaster. A gale created lashing rain and a heavy sea. Shortly after 23:00, flares were seen from a vessel on the Barber sands. The Cockle light-ship fired distress signals to indicate a vessel in trouble. The crew of the lifeboat Beauchamp were alerted and an attempt was made to launch the lifeboat. The heavy seas washed the boat off her skids and she was hauled back up the beach for another attempt. The crew fought until 02:00 in the dark and cold with warp and tackle to get the lifeboat afloat.

After the launch most of the launching crew went home to change their wet clothing. James Haylett Snr., who had been the assistant coxswain for many years and was now 78 years old, remained on watch despite being wet through and having no food. He had two sons, a son-in-law and two grandsons in the boat.

The coxswain, Aaron Haylett, steered towards the stricken vessel, but the sea conditions forced the boat back towards the beach, and she struck the beach bow first about 50 yards from the launch point. The heavy sea struck the starboard quarter and capsized the boat, breaking off the masts and trapping the crew beneath the boat. The Beauchamp was a Norfolk and Suffolk-class non-self-righting boat, 36 feet in length, 10 1/2 feet wide, and weighing 5 tons without her gear. When fully crewed and equipped and with ballast tanks full, she needed 36 men to bring her ashore.

The time was now around 03:00. Frederick Henry Hallett returned to the lifeboat house after getting changed and alerted his grandfather James Haylett Snr. to the cries coming from the boat. They ran to where the Beauchamp lay keel-up in the surf. James Haylett managed to pull his son-in-law Charles Knights from the boat. Frederick Haylett also ran into the surf and pulled John Hubbard clear. James Haylett returned to the water to pull his grandson Walter Haylett clear. Despite the bravery of these two men, these three were the only survivors.

People from the village arrived and struggled through the night and next day with block and tackle to right the stricken Beauchamp and retrieve the remaining bodies with the exception of that of Charles Bonney George, which was not recovered until the following April.

== Never turn back ==
Although incorrectly quoted from his testimony to the coroner at the inquest into the disaster, the phrase "Caister men never turn back" has endured through the years to represent not only the spirit of the Caister Lifeboat crews but those of lifeboatmen throughout the RNLI. During the inquest "Old Jimmy" was asked whether the lifeboatmen of the Beauchamp might have abandoned the rescue and returned for shore. James' reply was unequivocal; "They would never give up the ship. If they had to keep at it ‘til now, they would have sailed about until daylight to help her, Going back is against the rules when we see distress signals like that." These words, when reported by journalists, became the famous "Never turn Back" motto adopted by lifeboatmen to this day.

== Old Jimmy and the king ==
Following the disaster, Jimmy was on 6 January 1902 invited to Sandringham House to meet with King Edward VII and be presented with the RNLI Gold Medal. A special train brought him from Caister to the royal residence and he was received by the Prince of Wales at York Cottage on the Sandringham estate where they swapped sailing stories (the future King George V being an avid sailor himself). From there James Haylett was taken to the main house to lunch with the King. He delighted the King and onlookers when in response to the King's greeting of "Hello Mr.Haylett", he replied (in his rich Norfolk accent) " Hello, Mr. King". According to reports from the time they spent a few hours together exchanging tales of the sea before James was returned to Caister by train with a hamper each for every family of his lost crew mates courtesy of the King.
