= Caister Academy =

Location
- Windsor Road; Caister-on-Sea, Norfolk, NR30 5LS; England; 52.6539°N 1.7281°E

Information
- Type: Academy
- Motto: Be the best you can be
- Established: 1 March 2015
- Trust: Creative Education Trust
- Department for Education URN: 141331 Tables
- Ofsted: Reports
- Executive headteacher: Ben Driver
- Headteacher: Helen Seath
- Staff: 89
- Gender: Co-educational
- Age: 11 to 16
- Enrolment: 667 pupils
- Houses: Blue, Red, Yellow and Green
- Colours: Light Blue and Grey
- Website: caisteracademy.org.uk

Caister Academy, formerly known as Caister High School, is a coeducational secondary school in the seaside village of Caister-on-Sea in Norfolk, England.

== History ==
Caister Academy is a co-educational school for 11 to 16-year-old pupils which has held specialist arts college status since 2002. The school is on Windsor Road on the coast.

Caister High School received a devastating Ofsted report in May 2014, where it was said to require improvement in all categories. The school converted to academy status on 1 February 2015 and is sponsored by the Creative Education Trust. A new principal, Michelle Strong, was appointed and made the changes recommended at the preceding school's inspection, leaving in 2018 when the transformation was completed.

== Notable alumni ==
- Danny Crow, former footballer
