= Clipper Schooner =

Pub in Great Yarmouth, Norfolk, England

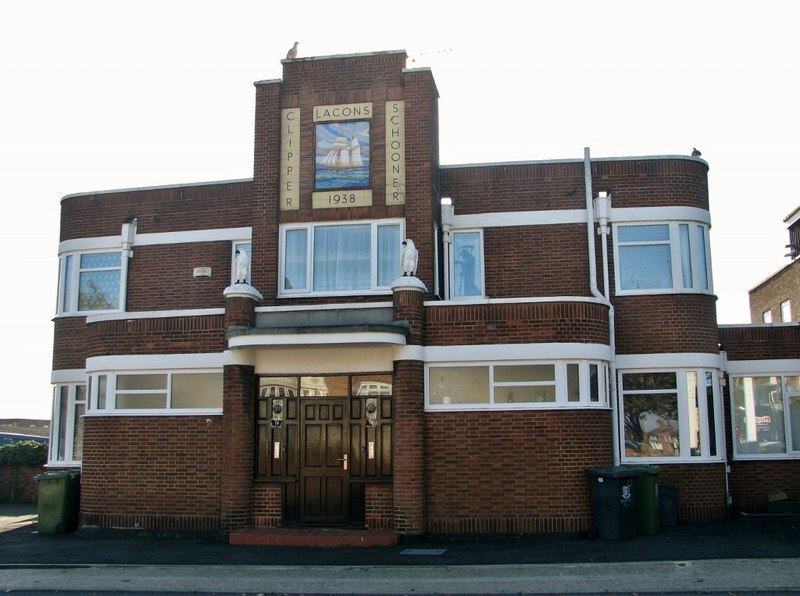

General information
- Type: Pub
- Location: Clipper Schooner; 19 Friars Lane; Great Yarmouth; Norfolk; NR30
- Completed: 1938

The Clipper Schooner is a public house at 19 Friars Lane, Great Yarmouth, in England. It was designed by A. W. Ecclestone in 1938 for Lacons brewers, for whom Ecclestone was the chief surveyor. It has a decorative tiled panel showing a sailing ship that the Tile Gazetteer describe as typical of Ecclestone's practice in his modern pub designs.

The current building replaced an earlier Lacons pub that dated from the mid-nineteenth century.

== See also ==
- Iron Duke also designed by Ecclestone
