= Iron Duke, Great Yarmouth =

Pub in Great Yarmouth, Norfolk, England

Coordinates: 52°37′40″N 1°44′18″E

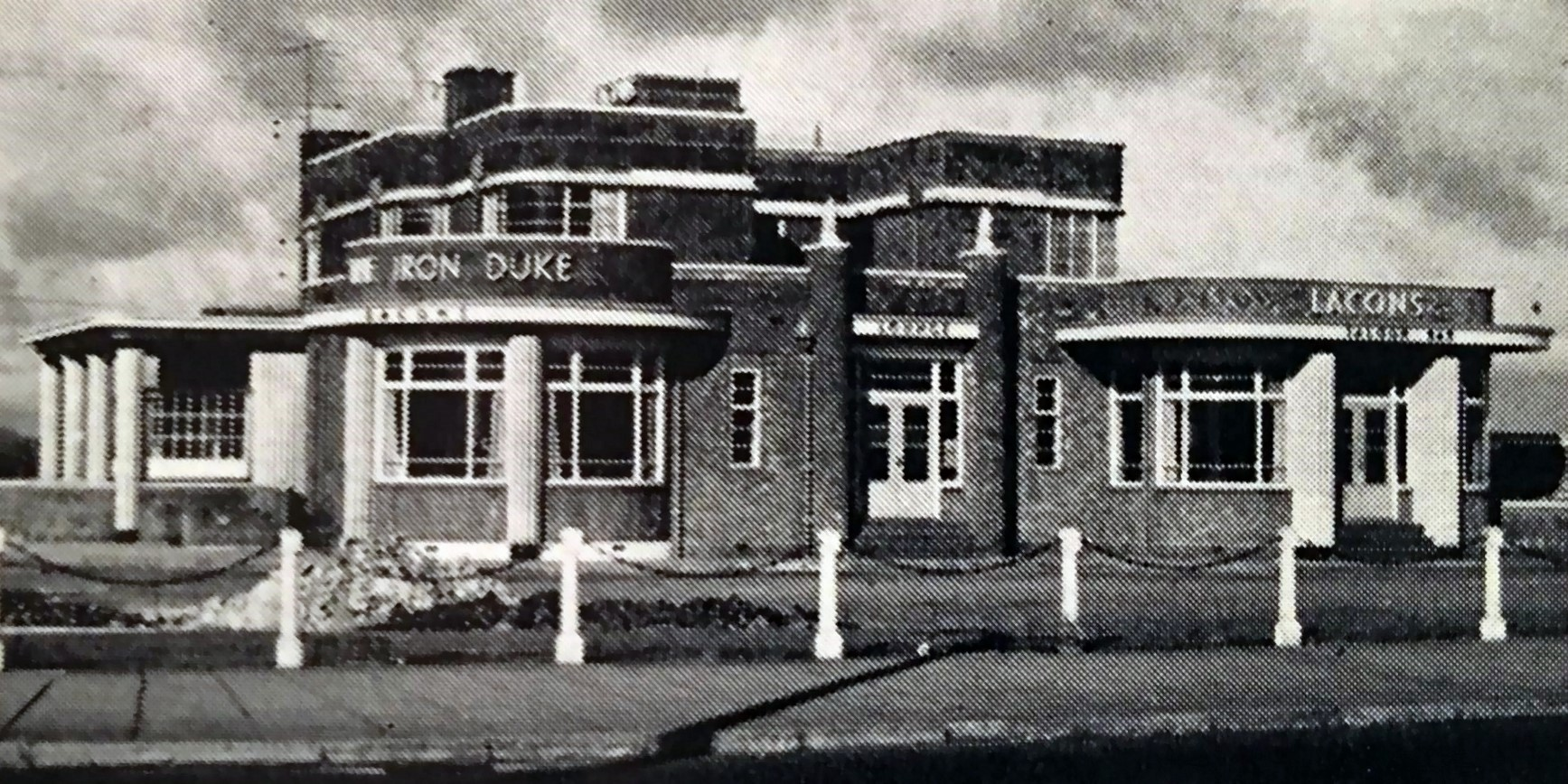
The Iron Duke, Great Yarmouth

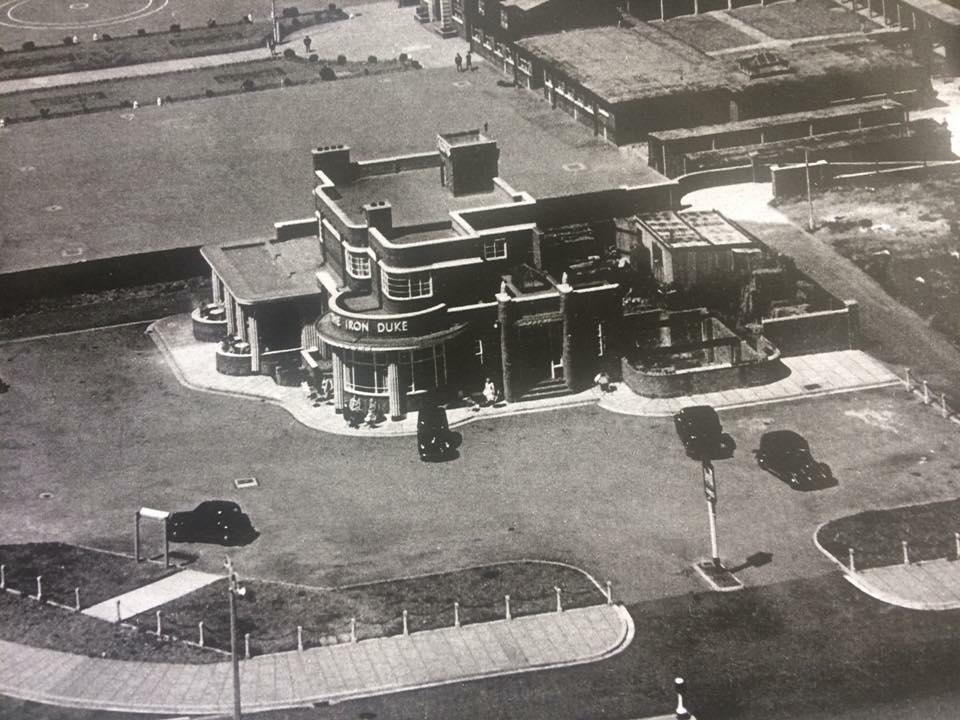
Aerial view

The Iron Duke is grade II listed public house in Great Yarmouth, Norfolk, England. It was designed by A. W. Ecclestone in the late 1930s and completed in 1948. Building work started in the Art Deco period; however, work was halted due to the outbreak of World War II. Despite being unfinished, a Special Licence was granted so that the Iron Duke could serve the troops stationed locally. The bars in the pub are made from teak taken from the First World War battleship HMS Iron Duke, which was captained by Admiral John Jellicoe at the Battle of Jutland. The pub was decorated with murals of the battle. The pub, listed as Grade II, now has a campaign to be restored. The pub is owned by Bourne Leisure, who has kept the pub closed for twenty years to prevent a rivel venue from opening next to their camp. Ecclestone was a skilled architect, and Lacons employed had an army of master builders. Everything was done in-house. The Iron Duke was built as their flagship pub.

An attempt to de-list and demolish the pub was made in 2018 by the owners of a neighbouring holiday park. Though Norfolk County Council made no objection, the Department for Digital, Culture, Media and Sport refused the delisting. After standing empty for 14 years, in December 2022, the National Lottery awarded funding for a restoration of the building in conjunction with the Great Yarmouth Preservation Trust and Norfolk American diner chain Zak's.

== See also ==
- Clipper Schooner also designed by Ecclestone
