= Svyatonossky Gulf =

Gulf of the Kola Peninsula, Russia

Coordinates: 68°05′00″N 39°40′00″E

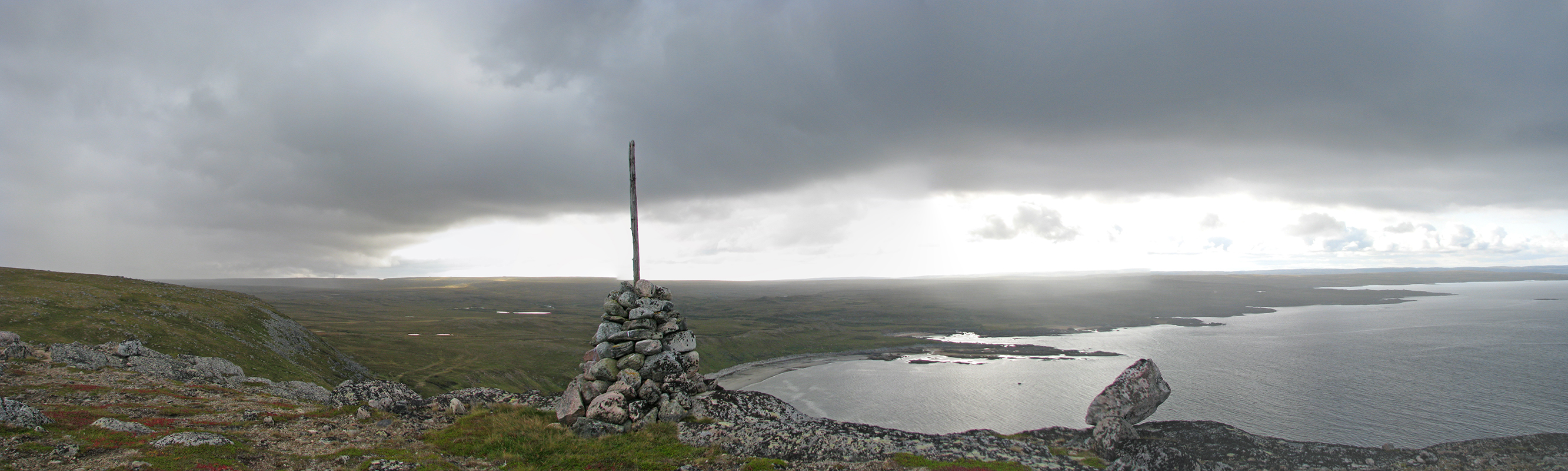
View on the gulf

Svyatonossky Gulf (Russian: Святоносский залив, Svyatonossky zaliv) is a body of water off the northeastern coast of the Kola Peninsula, Murmansk Oblast, Russia. Bukhtovka River flows to the gulf. Cape Svyatoy Nos separates the gulf from the Barents Sea.
