= Caister Volunteer Lifeboat Service =

Lifeboat station in Norfolk, England

Caister Volunteer Lifeboat Station
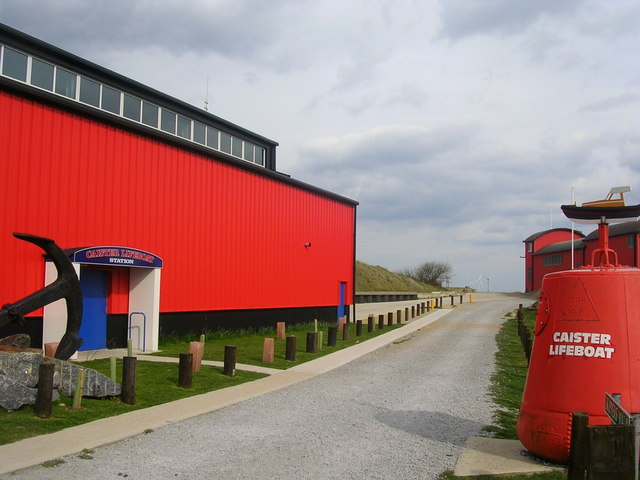
- Caister Volunteer Lifeboat Station.

- Location within Norfolk

General information
- Type: Lifeboat Station
- Location: Skippers Walk, Caister-on-Sea, Norfolk, NR30 5DJ, England
- Coordinates: 52°38′45.9″N 1°44′09.9″E
- Opened: NASLSM 1845; RNLI 1857; CVLS 1969

Website
- www.caisterlifeboat.org.uk

Caister Volunteer Lifeboat Service, or Caister Lifeboat, is based at Caister-on-Sea in Norfolk, and operates one of only three offshore lifeboats in the UK that are independent of the RNLI.

A lifeboat at Caister was first documented in 1791, being used by the Caister Beach Company to salvage ships wrecked on the sand banks offshore from Caister. Between 1856 and 1969 lifeboats at Caister were operated by the RNLI.

The station currently operates a 14 m (46 ft) Medina-class offshore lifeboat, CVLS 45-01 Annette Thurlow, and a 7 m (23 ft) long Alicat Inshore lifeboat, Fred Dyble II.

Caister Volunteer Lifeboat Service is a registered charity (No. 262126), supported entirely by public donation. It has 'Declared Facility' status with H.M. Coastguard, and is a member of the National Independent Lifeboats Association (NILA).

== History ==
=== Sinking of the Zephyr ===
At around midnight on 22 July 1885, the Caister lifeboat, the yawl Zephyr, was launched to the aid of a stranded schooner on the Lower Barber Sand. It was a calm and moonlit night and the crew of fifteen were on what they felt was a routine call. The assistant coxswain, James Haylett, Senior, was at the helm and as the yawl neared the Barber he called out "now dear boys, keep a lookout for that old stump" referring to the mast of a stone-laden schooner, the crew of which had been saved by the Caister men some nine years earlier. His warnings came too late however when the yawl's port bow struck the mast and the boat was ripped apart.

Seconds later the whole crew were struggling in the water. They managed to cut free much of the yawl's rigging and masts and this proved to be the salvation of the survivors. James Haylett supported himself on two oars before drifting close by the foremast, on which were his son Aaron, William Knowles and Joseph Haylett. They kept afloat for a time, but the mast kept rolling over in the swell. Aaron moved to his father's oars but William and Joseph were drowned. John George, another of the crew, swam towards the shore and came across a shrimper, The Brothers, of Yarmouth, which then led the search for the other crew members. First to be picked up was Robert Plummer on a grating, then one after the other, Aaron Haylett, Isaiah Haylett, George Haylett, Harry Russell, and lastly James Haylett, Senior, still on the foremast with an oar under one arm and a sett under the other. The remaining eight crewmen, including Aaron Haylett, were drowned.

=== 1901 Caister lifeboat disaster ===
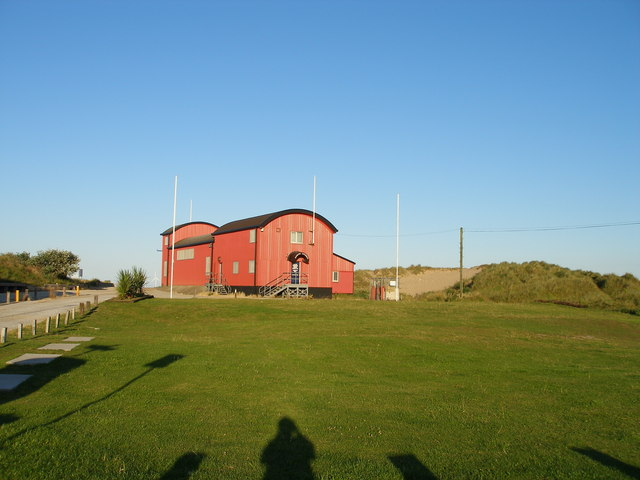
The old RNLI station at Caister

On the night of 13 November 1901, the lifeboat Beauchamp and nine crew were lost while attempting a rescue during heavy seas. Asked at the inquest to their deaths why the crew had persisted in the rescue, retired coxswain James Haylett in response to the question from the coroner "I suppose they had given up the job and were returning." said "They would never give up the ship. If they had to keep at it 'til now, they would have sailed about until daylight to help her. Going back is against the rules when we see distress signals like that." This response was translated by journalists to become the famous phrase "Caister men never turn back"; "Never Turn Back" was later to become a motto of the RNLI. A monument to the men lost in the disaster bearing this inscription stands in the cemetery at Caister and the pub nearest to the lifeboat shed is named the "Never Turn Back".

== RNLI and independent status ==
The RNLI lifeboat station at Caister was closed by the Institution in October 1969 after the Great Yarmouth and Gorleston lifeboat station received a 44-ft Waveney class lifeboat which was deemed fast enough to cover the Caister area. The Caister Lifeboat station re-opened as an independently run lifeboat station dependent on public donation, and continues to save lives today.

== Coxswain Roland "Benny" Read ==
Ever since its founding in 1824, the Royal National Institution for the Preservation of Life from Shipwreck (RNIPLS), and later as the RNLI from 1854, would make awards for deeds of gallantry at sea.

In 1987, CVLS Coxswain Roland "Benny" Read was awarded the "Thanks of the Institution on Vellum", for the rescue of the crew of ten from the rig support vessel Seaforth Conqueror which had run aground on North Scroby Sands.

At 13:30 on Sunday 1 September 1991, Coxswain Read received a request from the coastguard to launch the ILB. Requesting that the pagers be set off, he then went to the lifeboat station to set off the maroons. He was found dead on the slipway, after receiving chest injuries, when it exploded in his hand.

== Collection box ==
In 2016, a cast-iron RNLI Coin Collecting box, of a type used between 1863 and 1935, was discovered in the sand dunes near the station. Believed to have been washed away in a storm, it was identical to a box that had only recently been restored, which once stood in the Caister graveyard next to the Beauchamp Memorial. Both now reside in the Caister Lifeboat Heritage Museum.

== Station honours ==
The following are awards made at Caister.

- The Thanks of the Institution (RNLI) inscribed on Vellum

Roland 'Benny' Read, Coxswain – 1987

== List of coxswains ==
- 1845–1872 Ben Hodds
- 1872–1887 Philip George
- 1887–1900 James Haylett Jnr.
- 1900–1901 Aaron Haylett
- 1902–1903 John "Whampo" Brown
- 1903–1919 John "Spratt" Haylett
- 1919–1935 Charles Laycock
- 1935–1950 Joseph Woodhouse
- 1950–1956 James Brown
- 1956–1969 Jack Plummer
- 1969–1981 Alfred Brown
- 1981–1991 Roland "Benny" Read
- 1991–2004 Richard Thurlow
- 2004–2019 Paul Williams
- 2019–Present Day Guy Gibson

== Caister CVLS lifeboats ==
=== All-weather lifeboats ===
Number	Name	Built	On Station	Class	MMSI	Comments
CVLS	Shirley Jean Adye	1953	1973–1991	Liverpool		Formerly RNLB W. Ross MacArthur of Glasgow (ON 906)
CVLS 38-01	Bernard Matthews	1991	1991−2004			
CVLS 37-01	Bernard Matthews II	2004	2004−2025	Valentijn 2000		
CVLS 45-01	Annette Thurlow	2024	2025−	14 m (46 ft) Medina	232048763	

=== Inshore lifeboats ===
Name	Built	On Station	Class	MMSI	Comments
Jim Davidson		2001−????	ILB		
Fred Dyble		2013–2019	5 m (16 ft) Alicat RIB		
Fred Dyble II	2018	2019−	7 m (23 ft) Alicat RIB	232017063	

== See also ==
- Independent lifeboats in Britain and Ireland
- List of former RNLI stations
