= SS Broomfleet =

Cargo ship

SS Broomfleet was a cargo ship that sunk on the 13 December 1933. The ship was transporting coal from Goole, East Riding of Yorkshire to Ipswich, Suffolk. While in the North Sea the ship was caught in a storm and later sank off the coast of Norfork, England. All thirteen crew died in the sinking and several bodies were washed ashore.
