= 1901 Caister lifeboat disaster =

RNLI boat wrecked in the Great Storm

Coordinates: 52.650471°N 1.737689°E

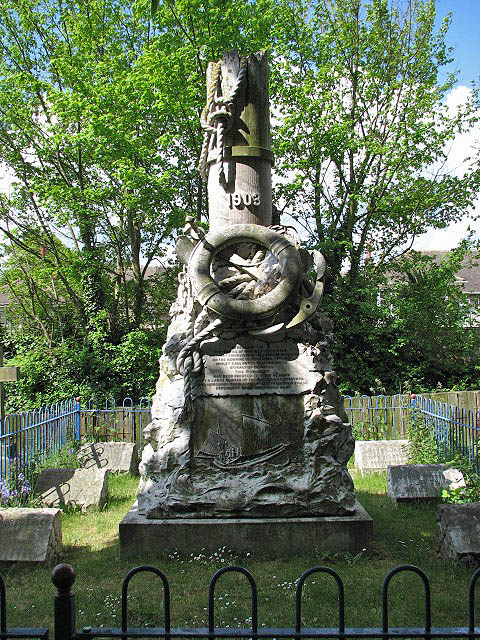
Memorial to the lifeboatmen who died

The Caister lifeboat disaster of 13 November 1901 occurred off the coast of Caister-on-Sea, Norfolk, England. It took place during what became known as the "Great Storm", which caused havoc down the east coasts of England and Scotland.

The Caister lifeboat Beauchamp was launched to attend a vessel but the heavy seas washed the lifeboat back to shore and capsized it trapping the crew. Three of the crew were rescued from the shore, the other nine died.

== Disaster events ==
Poor weather conditions on 13 November contributed to the disaster. A gale created lashing rain and a heavy sea. Shortly after 11:00 PM, flares were seen from a vessel on the Barber sands. The Cockle light-ship fired distress signals to indicate a vessel in trouble. The crew of the Caister lifeboat Beauchamp were alerted and an attempt was made to launch the lifeboat. The heavy seas washed the boat off her skids and she was hauled back up the beach for another attempt. The crew fought until 2:00 AM in the dark and cold with warp and tackle to get the lifeboat afloat.

After the launch, most of the launching crew went home to change their wet clothing. James Haylett Sr, who had been the assistant coxwain for many years and was now 78 years old, remained on watch despite being wet through and having no food. He had two sons, a son-in-law, and two grandsons in the boat.

The coxwain steered towards the stricken vessel but the sea conditions forced the boat back towards the beach and she struck the beach bow first about 50 yards (46 m) from the launch point. The heavy sea struck the starboard quarter and capsized the boat, breaking off the masts and trapping the crew beneath the boat. Beauchamp was a Norfolk and Suffolk-class non-self-righting boat, 36 feet (11 m) in length, 10 1/2 feet (3.2 m) wide and weighing 5 long tons (5.1 t) without her gear. When fully crewed and equipped and with ballast tanks full she needed 36 men to bring her ashore.

The time was now around 3:00 AM. Frederick Henry Haylett returned to the lifeboat house after getting changed and alerted his grandfather James Haylett Sr to the cries coming from the boat. They ran to where Beauchamp lay keel up in the surf. James Haylett managed to pull his son-in-law Charles Knights from the boat. Frederick Haylett also ran into the surf and pulled John Hubbard clear. James Haylett returned to the water to pull his grandson Walter Haylett clear. These were the only survivors.

== After the disaster ==
Eight bodies were subsequently recovered at the scene with another, that of Charles Bonney George, being washed away only to be recovered months later in April of the following year. The crewmen lost were Aaron Walter Haylett (Coxswain), James Haylett Jr (Late Cox), William Brown (Second Coxswain), Charles Brown, William Wilson, John Smith, George King, Charles George, and Harry Knights. Asked at the inquest to their deaths why the crew had persisted in the rescue, retired coxswain James Haylett said, "They would never give up the ship. If they had to keep at it 'til now, they would have sailed about until daylight to help her. Going back is against the rules when we see distress signals like that." This response was translated by journalists to become the famous phrase "Caister men never turn back"; "Never Turn Back" was later to become a motto of the RNLI. Haylett was subsequently awarded the RNLI Gold Medal in recognition of his gallantry and endurance.

The victims are all buried in Caister Cemetery, where a monument financed by public donations was raised for them in 1903.

== Beauchamp ==
Following the disaster, Beauchamp never returned to service and was abandoned in a boatyard before finally being broken up. Beauchamp, the cost of which was presented to the Institution by Sir Reginald Proctor Beauchamp, Bart, was placed on her station in 1892, and up to the time of the accident she had been launched to the aid of vessels in distress on 81 occasions and saved 146 lives; while the total number of lives which the lifeboats at Caister have saved during the past forty-three years is 1,281, a 'record' as regards the lifeboat stations of the United Kingdom. The RNLI closed the lifeboat station in October 1969 after the Great Yarmouth and Gorleston lifeboat station received a fast 44 ft (13 m) Waveney-class lifeboat. The Caister Lifeboat station re-opened as an independently run lifeboat station, and continues to save lives today.
