= Lacons Brewery =

Brewery in Great Yarmouth, Norfolk, England

- Interactive map of Lacons Brewery
- Location: Great Yarmouth, Norfolk, UK
- Coordinates: 52.5911°N 1.7338°E
- Opened: 1760
- Key people: Mick Carver
- Annual production volume: 9,000 hectolitres (5,500 imp bbl; 7,700 US bbl)
- Website: lacons.co.uk

Active beers
Name	Type
Encore	Cask ale
Legacy	Cask ale
Affinity	Cask ale
Lgr	Premium Lager

Other beers
Name	Type
Old Nogg	strong ale
Imperial Stout	Imperial Stout
Penny Black Porter	Imperial Porter

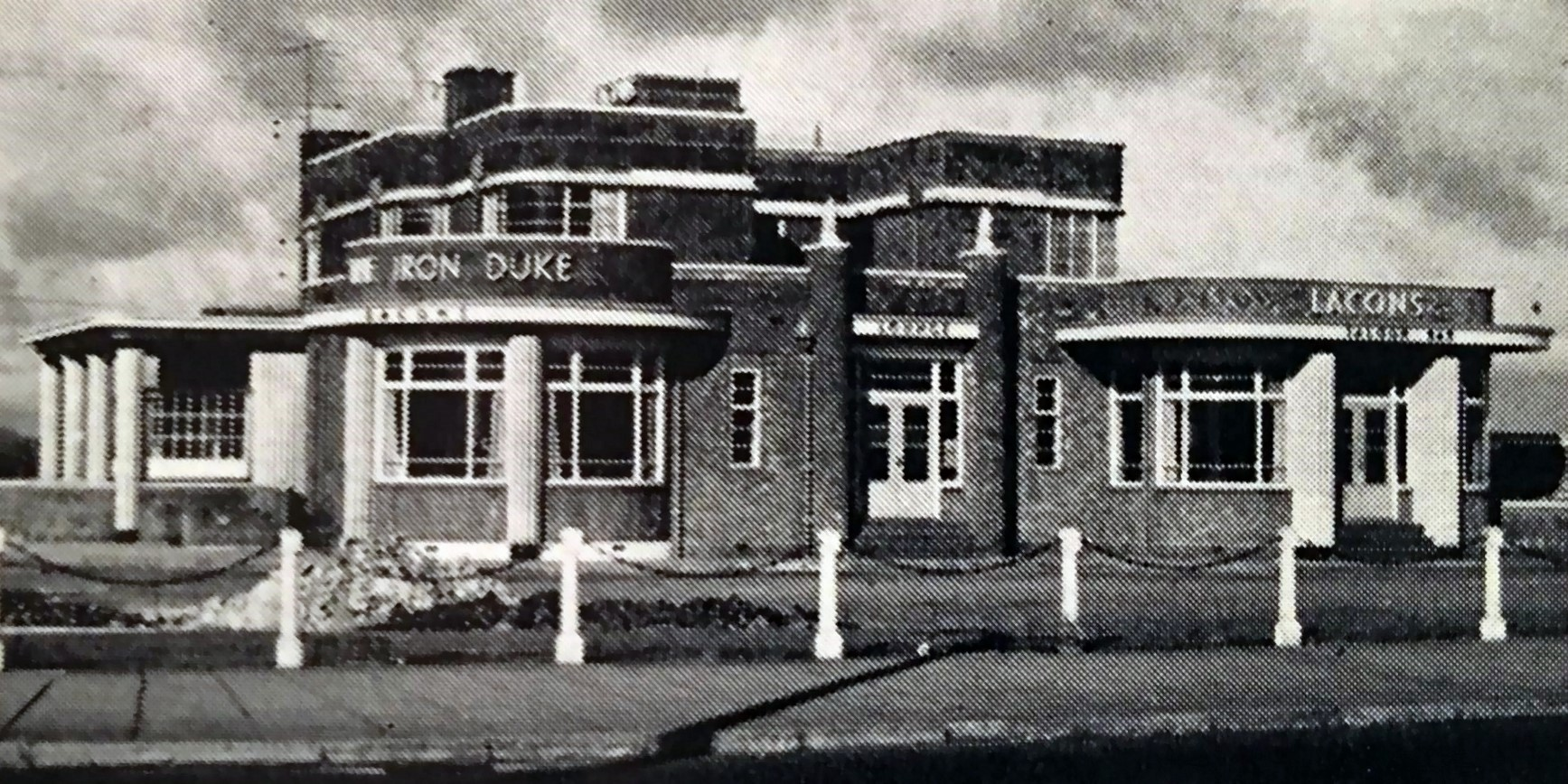
The Iron Duke, Great Yarmouth. Designed by A. W. Ecclestone.

Lacons Brewery is an independent brewery in Great Yarmouth, Norfolk, UK. In 2013, it produced 7,500 pints of beer a week.

Lacons Brewery was founded in 1760, but shut down in February 1968 and reclaimed independence in 2013.

== History ==
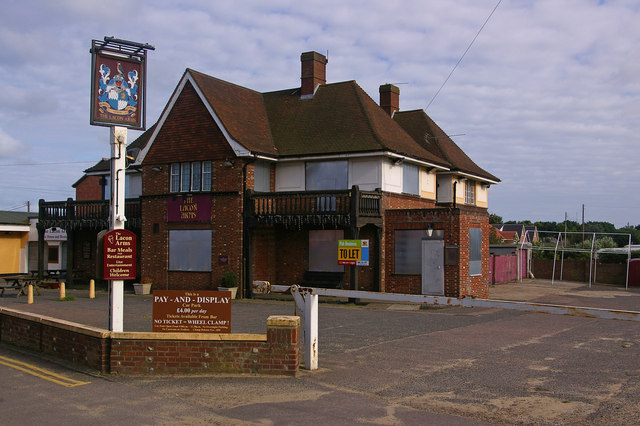
The Lacon Arms, Hemsby

In 1640, Jeffrey Ward operated as a brewer and a maltster in Church Plain, Great Yarmouth, on a site which was to become The Falcon Brewery. His son, George Ward who died in 1690, and his grandson Robert Ward, who died in 1741 managed the business in succession. Ward's widow took their son-in-law John Laycon in partnership. Laycon became the sole owner of the brewery on her death in 1760 and thus Lacons Brewery was formed. By the 1810s the business owned three maltings, two breweries and 45 tied houses in Great Yarmouth.

In the 1850s, the brewery held fifty public houses and controlled over 300 pubs in the East of England. In 1814, Lacons supplied over 20,000 pints of beer to a festival dinner held in the town to celebrate the final defeat of Napoleon's France. In the mid 1800s Lacons Brewery decided to sell to the London market and by 1866 it was despatching upwards of 50,000 barrels yearly to London, 20,000 to other locations, as well as the local market. The brewery produced around 100,000 barrels of beer a year.

In 1952, the directors of Lacons decided to float the company on the stock market and five years later sold 20% of the company to Whitbread. Whitbread bought Lacons for £3.2 million in 1965 and in 1968, Whitbread decided to shut down the brewery. Whitbread's brands and trademarks were later taken over by Anheuser-Busch InBev and thus the Lacons trademark went to Anheuser-Busch InBev.

Lacons deposited a sample of their brewing yeast in 1957 at the Norwich-based National Collection of Yeast Cultures, as a backup in case their own cultures got contaminated.

== Reopening ==
Mick Carver of JV Trading, a drinks distributor based in Lowestoft, started working to secure the rights to the Lacons name in 2009. He negotiated with Anheuser-Busch InBev to secure the name and its intellectual property. He then decided on an old Victorian courtyard in Main Cross Road as the premises for the operations.

He worked alongside William Lacon, son of the last Lacon family member to work at the brewery and sought assistance from David Lacon, an avid Lacons collector and nephew of Christopher Kevill Davis, the last CEO at Lacons. Yeast from the original beer was held in deep freeze at National Collection of Yeast Cultures. After obtaining the Lacons rights, Carver was able to claim the brewery's original yeast strains. Then Head Brewer, Wil Wood, spent six months developing the reinvented ales.

Carver employed a creative agency to rework the iconic emblem and logo of Lacons to capture how it would have evolved over the past 45 years if the brewery had not closed. The new Lacons’ emblem depicts a falcon with its wings outspread and ready to land, which symbolises the return of Lacons.

Lacons brewery reclaimed independence and relaunched at the Norwich City of Ale festival and Great Yarmouth Beer and Cider Festival in May 2013. In the initial phase of the operation, the brewery has planned to produce three new permanent beers both bottled and on tap as well as to introduce other seasonal beers. Three new permanent beers were launched: Encore, Legacy and Affinity. The company has extended the beer range to include some original Lacons recipes, in its heritage range. These beers are modern interpretations of historic recipes, dating back to 1905.
