= Caister-on-Sea =

Village and seaside resort in Norfolk, England

Coordinates: 52.651°N 1.733°E

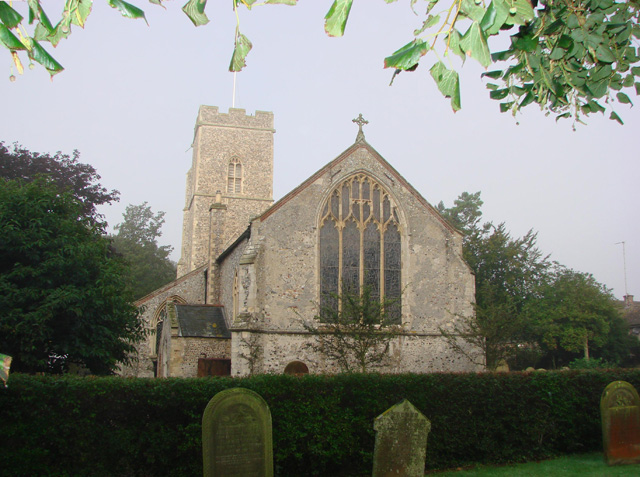
- Holy Trinity Church

- Location within Norfolk
- Population: 8,616 (2021 Census)
- OS grid reference: TG512125
- Civil parish: Caister-on-Sea
- District: Great Yarmouth
- Shire county: Norfolk
- Region: East
- Country: England
- Sovereign state: United Kingdom
- Post town: GREAT YARMOUTH
- Postcode district: NR30
- Dialling code: 01493
- Police: Norfolk
- Fire: Norfolk
- Ambulance: East of England
- UK Parliament: Great Yarmouth
- Website: caisterparishcouncil.gov.uk

Caister-on-Sea, known colloquially as Caister, is a large costal village, seaside resort and civil parish in the Great Yarmouth district, in the English county of Norfolk. Some people think it is a town due to its large population and amenities but it has never been granted town status. It is 2 3/4 miles (5 kilometres) north of Great Yarmouth and 18 miles (29 kilometres) east of Norwich on the North Sea coast.

At the 2021 census Caister had a population of 8,616, a decrease from 8,901 at the 2011 census.

== History ==
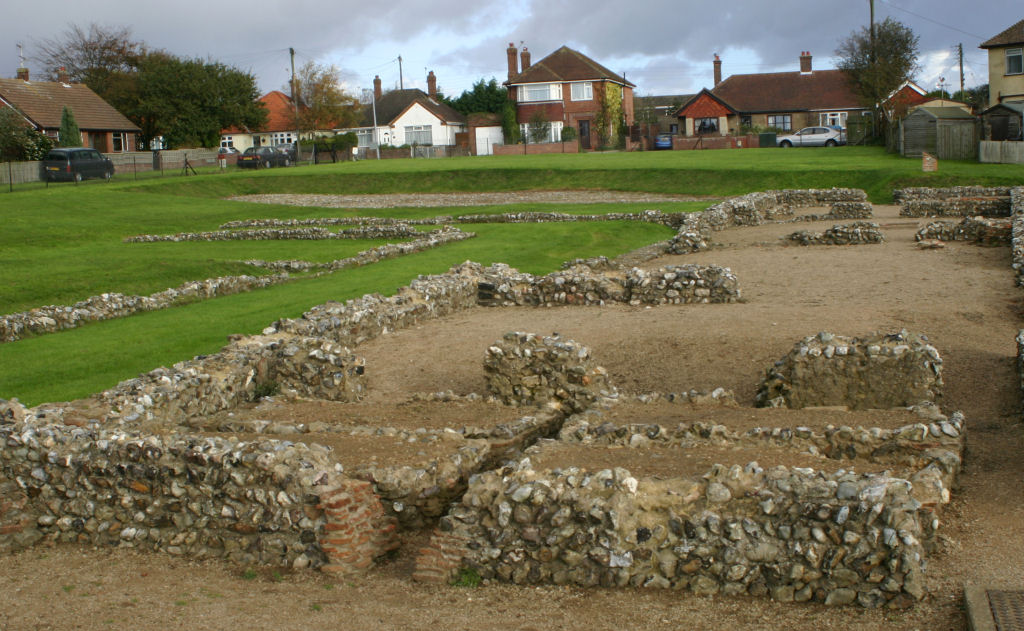
A view of Caister Roman Site

Caister's history dates back to Roman times. In around 200 CE a fort was built here as a base for a unit of the Roman army and navy. However its role as a fort appears to have been reduced following the construction of the Saxon Shore fort at Burgh Castle on the southern side of the estuary in the latter part of the third century.

In the 1950s, a building near the south gate at Caister was excavated in advance of a housing development. These buildings do not appear to be military as they include a hypocaust and painted wall plaster as well as female jewellery, and it has been suggested that this building may have been an officer's house, or possibly a "seamen's hostel", which may be a polite name for a brothel. The site appears to have been abandoned in the 5th century, but 150 Saxon burials have been found to the south of the enclosure. The remains excavated in the 1950s are now managed by English Heritage and are open free of charge to the public as Caister Roman Site.

In the 15th century, Caister Castle was built as a residence for Sir John Fastolf. The castle has an attached Motoring Museum and is still open to visitors.

There has been an offshore lifeboat in the area since 1791. It was used by a beach company to salvage ships wrecked on the sand banks. Between 1856 and 1969 lifeboats were operated by the RNLI. In the 1901 Caister lifeboat disaster, nine crew were lost while attempting a rescue during heavy seas. At the time it was said, "If they had to keep at it 'til now, they would have sailed about until daylight to help her. Going back is against the rules when we see distress signals like that". A monument to the men lost in the disaster bearing the inscription "Caister men never turn back" stands in the town cemetery, unveiled in 1903 and was listed Grade II by Historic England in 2020. A pub called the "Never Turn Back" is named after the incident.

The town was served by Caister-on-Sea railway station until it was closed in 1959. The nearest railway station is now Great Yarmouth, 2 1/2 miles (4 kilometres) to the south.

== Local government ==
Caister-on-Sea Parish Council is the lowest tier of local government. The district authority is Great Yarmouth Borough Council and county-level services are provided by Norfolk County Council. The parish council is based at The Council Hall on Yarmouth Road, a former Unionist hall built in 1912 and bought by the council in 1926.

Caister-on-Sea civil parish was named such in 1954. Prior to this it was called East Caister. The civil parishes of East Caister and West Caister were both formed in 1926 from the civil parish of Caister next Yarmouth, which was then abolished.

== Amenities ==
There is a Haven caravan and holiday park near the coast. The oldest holiday camp in the United Kingdom, it began as the "Caister Socialist Camp" in 1906. In the 1950s and early 1960s, it used to be on both sides of the road. Opposite the beach was a dining room, paper shop, sports facilities and tourist chalets. These facilities were sold to a property developer who turned it into housing in the 1970s. In the 1980s a new holiday camp was opened, under the ownership of Ladbrokes, which was sold to Warners in the 1990s.

== Church of the Holy Trinity ==
Caister's parish church is dedicated to the Holy Trinity and dates from the 13th century. It is Grade II* listed. The church was heavily restored in the late-19th century and is home to East Anglia's largest medieval font. Stained glass in the church includes a memorial to the men killed in the 1901 Caister lifeboat disaster by Paul Woodroffe as well as a depiction of Christ the Shepherd by Alfred Wilkinson. A set of royal arms may date from the reign of George III, although they could be a repurposed work from the reign of Charles I.

== Education ==
Caister Academy is a mixed school for pupils aged from 11 to 16 years, that first opened on 1 March 2015. It styles itself as a School of Literature and Performing Arts. Its predecessor was Caister High School.

== Sport and recreation ==
Caister Football Club was formed in 1908 and was a founding member of the Great Yarmouth and District League. The club's first ground was on a rabbit warren beside the coast, near to where the Never Turn Back public house now stands, and led to the club's original nickname being The Rabbits.

== Notable people ==
- John Fastolf – (1380–1459) knight and landowner, lived and died in Caister.
- Sarah Martin – (1791–1843) prison reformer and philanthropist, lived in Caister.
- James Haylett – (1825–1907) lifeboatman, lived in Caister.
- John Healing – (1873–1933) Gloucestershire cricketer, died in Caister.
- Len Holland – (b.1888–???) golfer, brought-up in Caister.
- Ron Hansell – (1930–2013) Norwich City and Chester, died in Caister.
- Terry Anderson – (1944–1980) Norwich City and Arsenal footballer, landlord of the Castle Hotel, Caister.
- Dale Gordon – (b.1967) Norwich City and Rangers footballer, born in Caister.
