= Cape Svyatoy Nos, Murmansk Oblast =

Headland in Russia

Cape Svyatoy Nos Святой Нос
- Cape
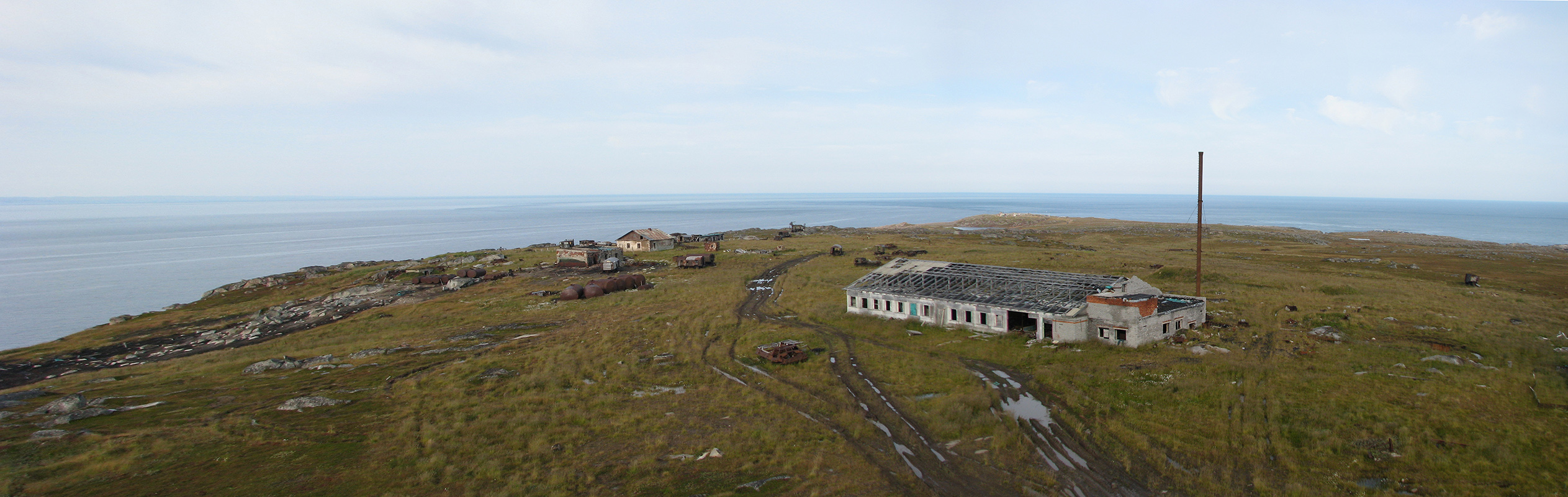
- View of the cape area

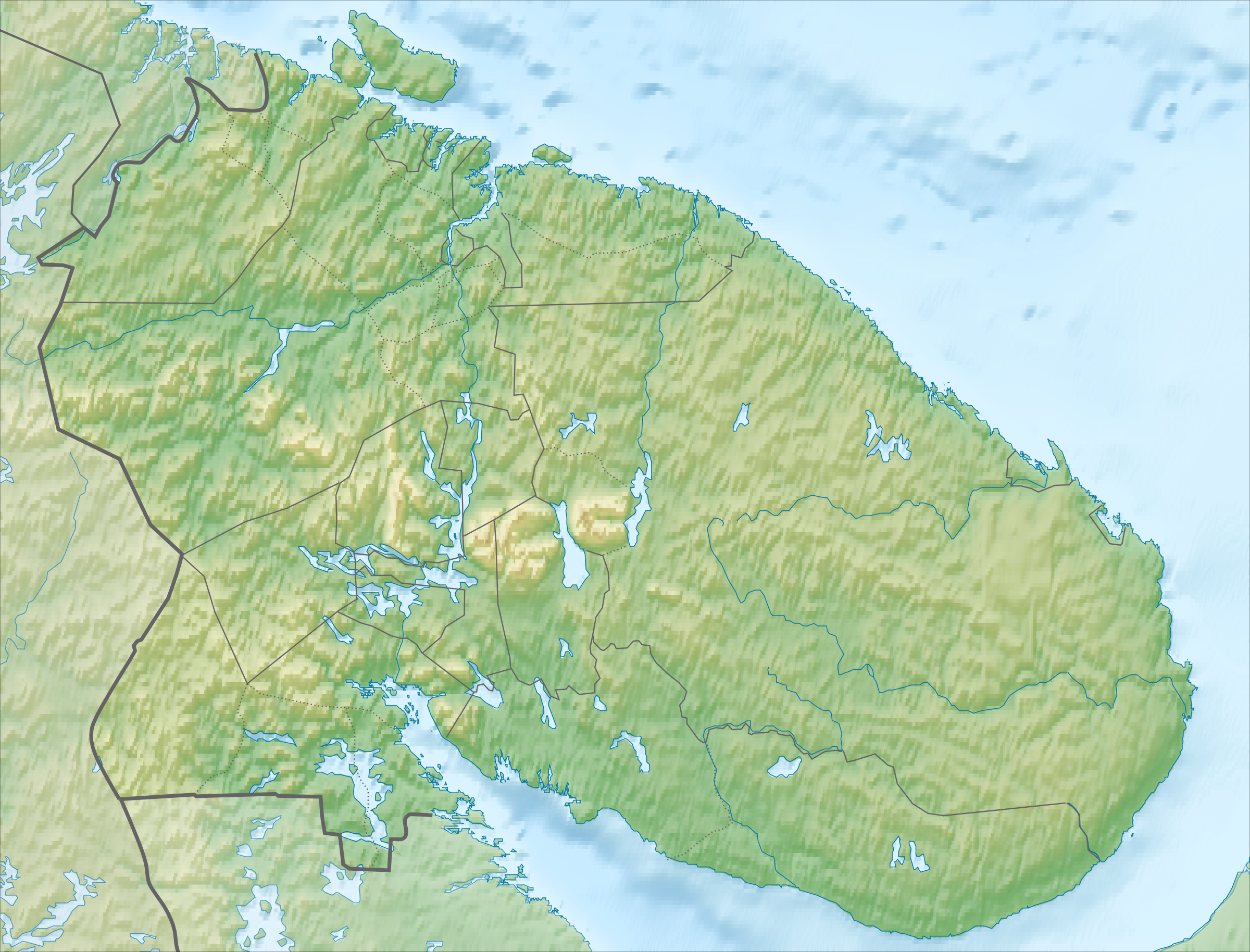
- Location of the cape in Murmansk Oblast
- Coordinates: 68°9′27″N 39°44′34″E
- Location: Kola Peninsula Russia
- Offshore water bodies: Barents Sea / White Sea

Area
  - Total: Russian Far North

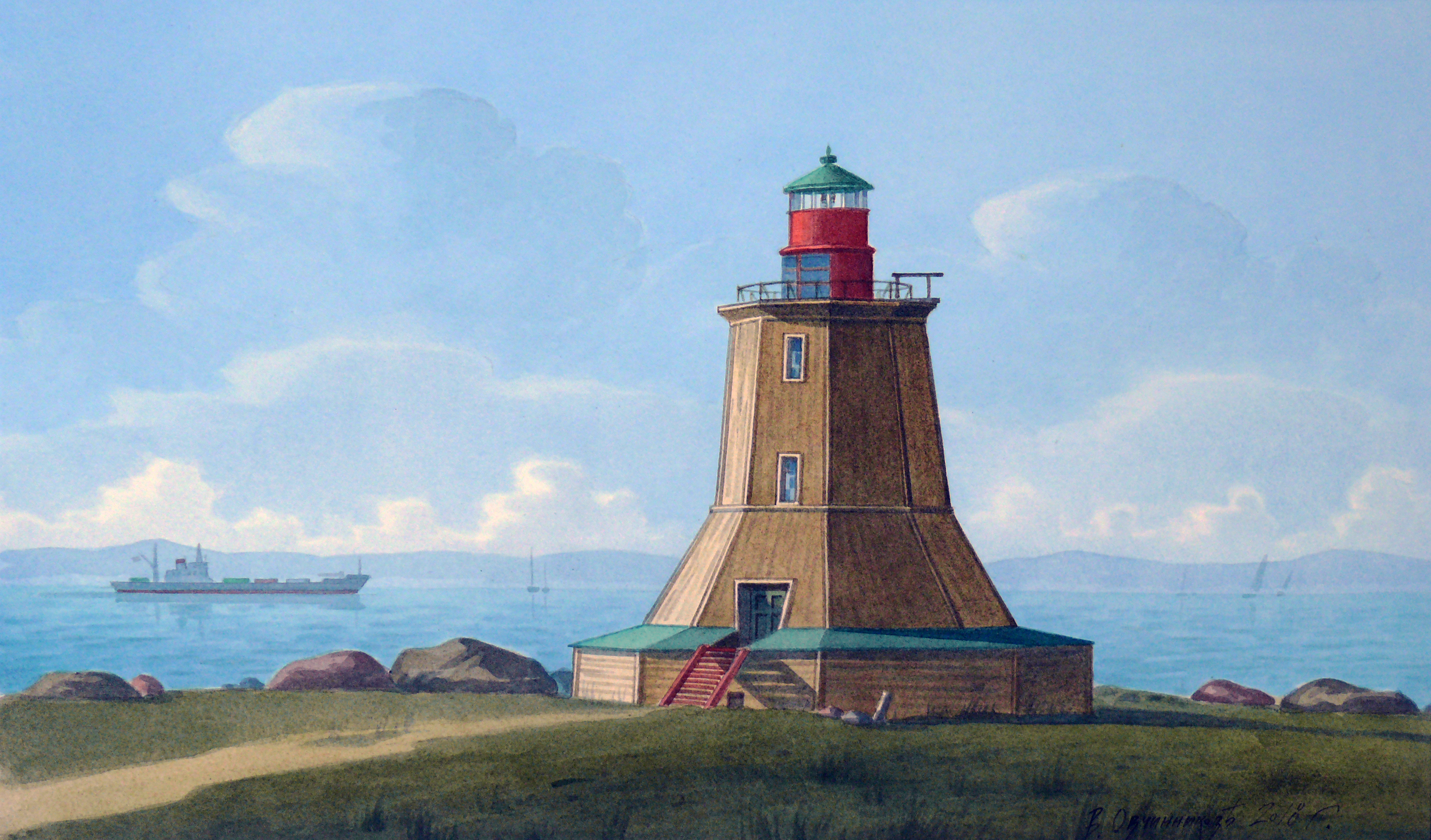
Svyatonossky Lighthouseby Vyacheslav Ovchinnikov

Cape Svyatoy Nos (Russian: Святой Нос, 'Holy Cape') is a headland in the Kola Peninsula, located between the Barents Sea and the White Sea. It separates Svyatonossky Gulf from the Barents Sea.

There are a Russian weather station, a lighthouse, and a military base near Cape Svyatoy Nos today.
