= Wolfpack Blücher =

- Active: 14 August 1942 to 28 August 1942
- Country: Nazi Germany
- Branch: Kriegsmarine
- Size: 8 submarines

Commanders
- Notable commanders: Peter-Erich Cremer; Harald Gelhaus

Blücher was a wolfpack of German U-boats that operated during the World War II Battle of the Atlantic from 14 to 28 August 1942. They attacked the Freetown, Sierra Leone to Liverpool convoys SL-118 and SL-119, and sank six ships for a total of 41,984 gross register tons (GRT), and damaged one (10,552 GRT). The group was named after Gebhard Leberecht von Blücher (1742–1819), a Prussian Generalfeldmarschall in the Napoleonic Wars.

== U-boats, commanders and dates ==
- U-333, Peter-Erich Cremer, 14–18 August
- U-653, Gerhard Feiler, 14–18 August
- U-590, Heinrich Müller-Edzards, 14–20 August
- U-214, Günther Reeder, 14–28 August
- U-406, Horst Dieterichs, 14–28 August
- U-566, Gerhard Remus, 14–28 August
- U-594, Friedrich Mumm, 14–28 August
- U-107, Harald Gelhaus, 23–28 August

== Ships hit by this Wolfpack ==
=== Triton ===
U-566 struck first, while north-east of the Azores. At 17:56 on 17 August 1942, she fired three torpedoes at Convoy SL-118, hitting the 6,607-ton Norwegian merchant ship Triton twice and sinking her. The master, 39 crewmen, two gunners and one passenger abandoned ship, and were picked up by the British merchantman Baron Dunmore.

=== Cheshire, Hatarana and Balingkar ===
At 18.52 hours on 18 August, U-214 fired four single torpedoes at Convoy SL-118; and hit three ships. One torpedo damaged the 10,552-ton armed merchant cruiser HMS Cheshire. Another damaged the 7,522-ton British merchant ship Hatarana so badly that she was abandoned by her crew of 108 and was scuttled by gunfire from the corvette HMS Pentstemon. The final two torpedoes struck the 6,318-ton Dutch cargo ship Balingkar, sinking her within 15 minutes with the loss of two men from her crew of 93.

=== City of Manila ===
The next day, 19 August, at 16:22 U-406 torpedoed the 7,452-ton British merchantman City of Manila, which was then abandoned by her crew.

=== City of Cardiff and Zuiderkerk ===
At 19:08 on 28 August U-566 fired a spread of three torpedoes at Convoy SL-119 west-north-west of Lisbon and hit two ships; the 5,661-ton British merchant ship City of Cardiff and the 8,424-ton Dutch merchant ship Zuiderkerk.

The Zuiderkerk was hit in the bows and was forced to stop to inspect the damage. She then managed to rejoin the convoy, but flooding in her holds forced the 56 crew and 12 passengers to abandon ship early on 29 August. The ship was then sunk with depth charges by HMS Erne. Meanwhile, the badly damaged City of Cardiff remained afloat, but foundered two days later with the loss of 21 crew.
