= German submarine U-333 =

German World War II submarine

History

Nazi Germany
- Name: U-333
- Ordered: 23 September 1939
- Builder: Nordseewerke, Emden
- Yard number: 205
- Laid down: 11 March 1940
- Launched: 14 June 1941
- Commissioned: 25 August 1941
- Fate: Sunk on 31 July 1944

General characteristics
- Class & type: Type VIIC submarine
- Displacement: 769 tonnes (757 long tons) surfaced; 871 t (857 long tons) submerged
- Length: 67.10 m (220 ft 2 in) o/a; 50.50 m (165 ft 8 in) pressure hull
- Beam: 6.20 m (20 ft 4 in) o/a; 4.70 m (15 ft 5 in) pressure hull
- Height: 9.60 m (31 ft 6 in)
- Draught: 4.74 m (15 ft 7 in)
- Installed power: 2,800–3,200 PS (2,100–2,400 kW; 2,800–3,200 bhp) (diesels); 750 PS (550 kW; 740 shp) (electric)
- Propulsion: 2 shafts; 2 × diesel engines; 2 × electric motors
- Speed: 17.7 knots (32.8 km/h; 20.4 mph) surfaced; 7.6 knots (14.1 km/h; 8.7 mph) submerged
- Range: 8,500 nmi (15,700 km; 9,800 mi) at 10 knots (19 km/h; 12 mph) surfaced; 80 nmi (150 km; 92 mi) at 4 knots (7.4 km/h; 4.6 mph) submerged
- Test depth: 230 m (750 ft); Crush depth: 250–295 m (820–968 ft)
- Complement: 4 officers, 40–56 enlisted
- Armament: 5 × 53.3 cm (21 in) torpedo tubes (four bow, one stern); 14 × torpedoes; 1 × 8.8 cm (3.46 in) deck gun (220 rounds); 1 x 2 cm (0.79 in) C/30 AA gun

Service record
- Part of: 5th U-boat Flotilla; 25 August – 31 December 1941; 3rd U-boat Flotilla; 1 January 1942 – 31 July 1944
- Identification codes: M 02 500
- Commanders: Kptlt. Peter-Erich Cremer; 25 August 1941 – 6 October 1942; Lt.z.S. Helmut Kandzior; 6 – 9 October 1942; Kptlt. Lorenz Kasch; 9 October – 22 November 1942; Oblt.z.S. Werner Schwaff; 22 November 1942 – 17 May 1943; K.Kapt. Peter-Erich Cremer; 18 May 1943 – 19 July 1944; Kptlt. Hans Fiedler; 20 – 31 July 1944
- Operations: 12 patrols: 1st patrol: 27 December 1941 – 9 February 1942; 2nd patrol: 30 March – 26 May 1942; 3rd patrol: 11 – 24 August 1942; 4th patrol: a. 1 September – 9 October 1942; b. 9–23 October 1942; 5th patrol: 20 December 1942 – 5 February 1943; 6th patrol: 2 March – 13 April 1943; 7th patrol: 2 June – 31 August 1943; 8th patrol: 21 October – 1 December 1943; 9th patrol: 10 – 12 February 1944; 10th patrol: 14 February – 20 April 1944; 11th patrol: 6 – 13 June 1944; 12th patrol: 23 – 31 July 1944
- Victories: 7 merchant ships sunk (32,107 GRT); 1 merchant ship damaged (8,327 GRT); 1 warship damaged (925 tons)

German submarine U-333 was a Type VIIC U-boat of Nazi Germany's Kriegsmarine during World War II. The submarine was laid down on 11 March 1940 at the Nordseewerke yard at Emden, launched on 14 June 1941, and commissioned on 25 August 1941 under the command of Kapitänleutnant Peter-Erich Cremer. After training with the 5th U-boat Flotilla at Kiel, on 1 January 1942 U-333 was transferred to the 3rd U-boat Flotilla based at La Pallice for front-line service.

The U-boat made 12 combat patrols in the next three years, and sank seven merchant ships totalling 32,107 gross register tons (GRT), damaged another of 8,327 GRT, and also engaged and damaged the Flower-class corvette HMS Crocus. U-333 was sunk in the English Channel by British warships using a Squid on 31 July 1944.

U-333 bore the "three little fishes" emblem on her conning tower.

== Design ==
German Type VIIC submarines were preceded by the shorter Type VIIB submarines. U-333 had a displacement of 769 tonnes (757 long tons) when at the surface and 871 tonnes (857 long tons) while submerged. She had a total length of 67.10 m (220 ft 2 in), a pressure hull length of 50.50 m (165 ft 8 in), a beam of 6.20 m (20 ft 4 in), a height of 9.60 m (31 ft 6 in), and a draught of 4.74 m (15 ft 7 in). The submarine was powered by two Germaniawerft F46 four-stroke, six-cylinder supercharged diesel engines producing a total of 2,800 to 3,200 metric horsepower (2,060 to 2,350 kW; 2,760 to 3,160 shp) for use while surfaced, two AEG GU 460/8–27 double-acting electric motors producing a total of 750 metric horsepower (550 kW; 740 shp) for use while submerged. She had two shafts and two 1.23 m (4 ft) propellers. The boat was capable of operating at depths of up to 230 metres (750 ft).

The submarine had a maximum surface speed of 17.7 knots (32.8 km/h; 20.4 mph) and a maximum submerged speed of 7.6 knots (14.1 km/h; 8.7 mph). When submerged, the boat could operate for 80 nautical miles (150 km; 92 mi) at 4 knots (7.4 km/h; 4.6 mph); when surfaced, she could travel 8,500 nautical miles (15,700 km; 9,800 mi) at 10 knots (19 km/h; 12 mph). U-333 was fitted with five 53.3 cm (21 in) torpedo tubes (four fitted at the bow and one at the stern), fourteen torpedoes, one 8.8 cm (3.46 in) SK C/35 naval gun, 220 rounds, and a 2 cm (0.79 in) C/30 anti-aircraft gun. The boat had a complement of between forty-four and sixty.

== Service history ==
=== First patrol ===
U-333 sailed from Kiel on 27 December 1941, through the North Sea, and into the Atlantic. On 1 January 1942 the U-boat was attacked by an unidentified enemy aircraft, but was not damaged. U-333 then joined the wolfpack 'Ziethen' on 17 January 1942, and at 20:45 on 22 January, attacked the 3,429 GRT Greek merchant ship Vassilios A. Polemis, a straggler from Convoy ON 53. The ship, hit amidships by a single torpedo, broke in two and sank within ten minutes. The U-boat questioned the 12 survivors from the crew of 33, and gave them bread and cigarettes.

At 15:25 on 24 January, about 85 nautical miles (157 km; 98 mi) southeast of Cape Race, U-333 attacked the 4,765 GRT Norwegian merchant ship Ringstad, which had lost contact with Convoy ON 55 after several days of storms. The ship was hit on the starboard side by a single torpedo, and the crew of 43 abandoned ship in three lifeboats. After 20 minutes the ship sank, the U-boat surfaced to question the crew, offered water and food, and gave them a heading to the nearest land before wishing them good luck and leaving. However, in heavy weather two lifeboats containing 30 men were lost, while the third lifeboat was eventually spotted, covered in ice, five days later by an aircraft that brought USS Swanson to their rescue.

==== The sinking of Spreewald ====
At 16:50 hours on 31 January 1942, north of the Azores U-333 attacked an unescorted and zigzagging 5,083 GRT merchant ship with a single torpedo, which promptly sent out a distress signal en clair under the name Britanny. Cremer examined the ship from a distance of 400 metres (440 yd) before U-333 torpedoed the ship again at 18:33, and sank her. Unfortunately, she was in fact the German blockade runner Spreewald, en route from Dairen in Manchuria to Bordeaux with a cargo of 3,365 tons of rubber, 230 tons of tin, 20 tons of tungsten, and quinine, as well as 86 prisoners from ships that had been sunk by the auxiliary cruiser Kormoran. Cremer failed to identify her, as she was camouflaged as the Norwegian ship Elg and was ahead of schedule.

A search for survivors was promptly launched. U-333 and U-575, which was waiting to escort the ship into port and U-123, which was waiting to transfer an injured crewman to the ship, were soon joined by U-701 and U-582, which were returning from their patrols, and U-332 and U-105, which had just begun theirs.

Late on 2 February, U-105 picked up 25 crewmen and 55 prisoners in three lifeboats and three rafts. Another lifeboat, containing 11 crewmen and 13 prisoners was missing and U-105 searched for a further three days before giving up and setting a course to Lorient. To compound the disaster, when a Dornier Do 24 flying boat was sent out to pick up a severely injured sailor, it crashed in rough seas. U-105 rescued the seven-man crew and sank the aircraft with gunfire. Of the 152 aboard the Spreewald, 72 were killed.

After returning from his patrol on 9 February 1942, Cremer was court-martialled, but was found not guilty.

=== Second patrol ===
U-333 left her new home port of La Pallice on 30 March 1942, and headed across the Atlantic to the coast of Florida. There, on 6 May, she attacked three ships, sinking two. The first was the unescorted 8,327 GRT American tanker Java Arrow, hit by two torpedoes eight miles (13 km) off Vero Beach at 05:43. The attack killed two officers on watch below, the 45 survivors abandoned ship in two lifeboats. They were later picked up by the submarine chaser USS PC-483 and a Coast Guard vessel. Four men returned to the ship and dropped the anchor to prevent the ship from going aground. The Master then went to Fort Pierce and returned later with 14 of his crew and the salvage tugs Ontario and Bafshe which towed the tanker to Port Everglades. The ship was repaired and returned to service in 1943.

Meanwhile, at 09:35, off Fort Pierce, U-333 hit the unescorted 1,294 GRT Dutch merchant ship Amazone with a single torpedo on the port side. The ship, en route to New York from Curaçao with a cargo of 926 tons of coffee and oil, sank within two minutes. Fourteen crewmen were lost, while the 11 survivors were picked up by the submarine chaser USS PC-484.

Finally, at 23:25 the unescorted and unarmed 7,088 GRT American tanker Halsey was hit by two torpedoes off St Lucie Inlet, ripping a hole in the side 60 feet (18 m) long. The ship, en route from Corpus Christi, Texas to New York, was laden with 40,000 barrels (6,400 m^{3}) of naphtha and 40,000 barrels (6,400 m^{3}) of heating oil. The crew of 32 abandoned ship in two lifeboats, almost being asphyxiated by naphtha fumes. An hour later the Halsey exploded, broke in two, and burst into flames. The lifeboats were soon found by USS PC-451, and towed to land by two fishing vessels.

The next day, 7 May, U-333 was hunted by a convoy escort ship, and badly damaged by depth charges, forcing the U-boat to return to France. However, at 09:05 on 10 May, she attacked the unescorted 5,214 GRT British Clan Line merchant ship Clan Skene about 300 nautical miles (560 km; 350 mi) south-east of Cape Hatteras. The ship, carrying 2,006 tons of chrome ore from Beira in Portuguese East Africa to New York, was hit by two torpedoes and sank. Nine crewmen were killed, while 73 survivors were later picked up by the destroyer USS McKean. Cremer noted in his Kriegstagebücher ("War diary") that the sinking of this ship was like .. a balm after these terrible depth charges. U-333 finally arrived back at La Pallice on 26 May.

=== Third patrol ===
U-333's next patrol was uneventful. Departing La Pallice on 11 August 1942, she joined wolfpack 'Blücher' north-east of the Azores from 14 to 18 August, but had no successes, and returned to port on 24 August after only 14 days at sea.

=== Fourth patrol ===
U-333 sailed from La Pallice once more on 1 September 1942, and headed south to the coast of West Africa, joining wolfpack 'Iltis' between 6–23 September.

On 6 October the U-boat engaged the British Flower-class corvette HMS Crocus about 60 nautical miles (110 km; 69 mi) south-west of Freetown, Sierra Leone. Crocus detected U-333 by radar, and closed at high speed. The U-boat was rammed twice, and exchanged gunfire at close range before submerging, while the corvette dropped depth charges. The U-333 lay low, later surfacing and making her escape under cover of darkness. Both vessels suffered damage and sustained casualties. On the U-boat three men were killed; Bootsmaat Heinz Kurze, Maschinenobergefreiter Erwin Levermann, and the First Watch Officer (second-in-command) Oberleutnant zur See Bernhard Hermann, while several men were wounded, including the commander Peter-Erich Cremer. Command of U-333 was taken by the Second Watch Officer (third-in-command) Leutnant zur See Helmut Kandzior, who took the U-boat to a rendezvous with U-107 three days later, where Kapitänleutnant Lorenz Kasch, a Captain under instruction, assumed temporary command. U-333 also received medical assistance from a doctor on the Milchkuh U-459.

On 21 October the inbound U-333 was attacked by the British submarine HMS Graph about 50 nautical miles (93 km; 58 mi) north-north-east of Cape Ortegal, Spain. The British submarine was formerly the German U-570, captured on 27 August 1941, extensively studied, and commissioned into the Royal Navy. Graph, on her first war patrol in British service, fired a spread of four torpedoes at the surfaced U-boat, but lookouts spotted the tracks and U-333 managed to evade them. U-333 arrived back at La Pallice two days later, on 23 October 1942, and Cremer then spent three months in hospital.

=== Fifth patrol ===
Oberleutnant zur See Werner Schwaff was appointed temporary commander of U-333 on 22 November 1942, and set sail from La Pallice on his first patrol on 20 December 1942. The U-boat sailed out to patrol the Atlantic south-west of Iceland, joining wolfpacks 'Falke' from 28 December 1942 to 19 January 1943, and 'Landsknecht' from 19 to 28 January 1943. However she had no successes, and eventually returned to base on 5 February 1943 after a patrol lasting 48 days.

=== Sixth patrol ===
Two days after departing from La Pallice on 2 March 1943, U-333 was attacked in the Bay of Biscay by a British Wellington Mk.VIII bomber from No. 172 Squadron RAF equipped with a Leigh light. When the aircraft illuminated the U-boat, it was met with a barrage of AA fire. The bomber passed over U-333, and dropped four depth charges before crashing into the sea, killing the crew of six. Two depth charges actually hit U-333, but one broke up without detonating and the other bounced off and caused only light damage.

U-333 continued her patrol, returning to the seas south-west of Iceland, and joining wolfpack 'Dränger' on 14 March. There, on 19 March at 21:28, she torpedoed and sank the 5,234 GRT Greek merchant ship Carras, a straggler from Convoy SC 122, which had been hit by a torpedo from U-666 earlier. All the crew of 34 survived and were picked up by the British rescue ship Zamalek. U-333 joined wolfpack 'Seewolf' from 21 to 30 March, but had no more successes before returning to La Pallice on 13 April.

Carras would be the last ship sunk by U-333, as the balance of power in the Battle of the Atlantic now swung in favour of the Allies, culminating in Black May (1943).

=== Seventh patrol ===
On 18 May 1943 Peter-Erich Cremer, now recovered from his injuries and promoted to the rank of Korvettenkapitän, reassumed command of U-333. On 2 June the U-boat sailed from La Pallice and headed south to the coast of West Africa. However, she had no success, and returned to base on 31 August after 91 days.

=== Eighth patrol ===
U-333's next patrol began on 21 October 1943, heading out into the Atlantic north-east of the Azores, where she joined wolfpack 'Schill' on the 25th. On 4 November, while shadowing a KMS convoy, bound for Gibraltar from Liverpool, U-333 surfaced in heavy fog, but was forced to dive by a destroyer and heavily depth charged, but managed to escape unharmed.

U-333 joined wolfpack 'Schill 1' on 16 November. On the 18th, while attacking the combined convoys SL 139 and MKS 30, the U-boat was rammed by the frigate HMS Exe, losing her periscope. U-333 was then subjected to an attack from warships and an aircraft that lasted for eight hours, before making her escape. The U-boat returned to La Pallice on 1 December 1943 having had no success.

=== Ninth and tenth patrol ===
U-333 sailed out on a patrol on 10 February 1944, but returned after only two days on the 12th. The U-boat left again on 14 February and headed into the waters west of Ireland. There, on 21 March, the U-boat was spotted by Allied aircraft which in turn brought in the Royal Navy's renowned U-boat hunters, the 2nd Support Group, under the command of Captain F.J. Walker. Pursued relentlessly, Cremer eventually took U-333 to the bottom and sat on the sea floor at a depth of 131 feet (40 m) for 10 hours. Although releasing the U-boat from the grip of the mud was a problem, she eventually freed herself, and once again U-333 escaped. The U-boat returned to base on 20 April 1944, again having had no success.

=== Eleventh patrol ===
Departing from La Pallice on 6 June 1944, U-333 fell victim to the increased anti-submarine activity by the Allies after the Normandy landings. On 10 June, while still in the Bay of Biscay, U-333 was attacked by an Australian Sunderland flying boat patrol bomber of No. 10 Squadron RAAF, and suffered some damage, although she managed to repel the aircraft with her flak. The next day U-333 was attacked, again by another Sunderland, this time from No. 228 Squadron RAF. U-333 managed to shoot the aircraft down, but suffered further damage, forcing her to abort her patrol and return to base on 13 June.

=== Twelfth patrol ===
On 19 July 1944 Cremer left U-333 in order to commission the new Type XXI Elektroboot U-2513, and Kapitänleutnant Hans Fiedler was appointed as commander on the 20th. His first, and U-333's final patrol began on 23 July, as she headed into the Western Approaches.

==== Sinking ====
U-333 was sunk on 31 July 1944, west of the Scilly Isles, in position 49°39′N 07°28′W, by the first use of the Squid anti-submarine mortar from the British Royal Navy sloop Starling and frigate Loch Killin of the 2nd Support Group. All 45 hands were lost.

=== Wolfpacks ===
U-333 took part in nine wolfpacks, namely:

- Zieten (17 – 22 January 1942)
- Blücher (14 – 18 August 1942)
- Iltis (6 – 23 September 1942)
- Falke (28 December 1942 – 19 January 1943)
- Landsknecht (19 – 28 January 1943)
- Dränger (14 – 20 March 1943)
- Seewolf (21 – 30 March 1943)
- Schill (25 October – 16 November 1943)
- Schill 1 (16 – 19 November 1943)

== Summary of raiding history ==
Between August 1941 and July 1944 U-333 sailed on 12 combat patrols, and sank seven merchant ships totalling 32,107 GRT, damaged another of 8,327 GRT, and also engaged and damaged the 925 tons Flower-class corvette HMS Crocus. She also shot down two aircraft.

Ships attacked by U-333
| Date | Ship | Tonnage (Note: Merchant ship tonnages are in gross register tons. Military vessels are listed by tons displacement.) | Nationality | Convoy | Fate and location |
|---|---|---|---|---|---|
| 22 January 1942 | Vassilios A. Polemis | 3,429 | Greece | ON 53 | Sunk at 42°32′N 52°38′W |
| 24 January 1942 | Ringstad | 4,765 | Norway | ON 55 | Sunk at 45°50′N 51°04′W |
| 31 January 1942 | Spreewald | 5,083 | Nazi Germany | | Sunk at 45°12′N 24°50′W |
| 6 May 1942 | Amazone | 1,294 | Netherlands | | Sunk at 27°21′N 80°04′W |
| 6 May 1942 | Halsey | 7,088 | United States | | Sunk at 27°14′N 80°03′W |
| 6 May 1942 | Java Arrow | 8,327 | United States | | Damaged at 27°35′N 80°08′W |
| 10 May 1942 | Clan Skene | 5,214 | United Kingdom | | Sunk at 31°43′N 70°43′W |
| 6 October 1942 | HMS Crocus | 925 | Royal Navy | | Damaged at 07°52′N 14°57′W |
| 19 March 1943 | Carras | 5,234 | Greece | SC 122 | Sunk at 54°05′N 24°19′W |

== Bibliography ==
- Busch, Rainer; Röll, Hans-Joachim (1999). German U-boat commanders of World War II : a biographical dictionary. Translated by Brooks, Geoffrey. London, Annapolis, Md: Greenhill Books, Naval Institute Press. ISBN 1-55750-186-6.
- Busch, Rainer; Röll, Hans-Joachim (1999). Deutsche U-Boot-Verluste von September 1939 bis Mai 1945 [German U-boat losses from September 1939 to May 1945]. Der U-Boot-Krieg (in German). Vol. IV. Hamburg, Berlin, Bonn: Mittler. ISBN 3-8132-0514-2.
- Gröner, Erich; Jung, Dieter; Maass, Martin (1991). U-boats and Mine Warfare Vessels. German Warships 1815–1945. Vol. 2. Translated by Thomas, Keith; Magowan, Rachel. London: Conway Maritime Press. ISBN 0-85177-593-4.
- Cremer, P. (1984). U-Boat Commander: A Periscope View of the Battle of the Atlantic. Annapolis: Naval Institute Press. ISBN 0-87021-969-3.
- Peter Cremer (trans. Fritz Brustat-Naval) :U 333 : the Story of a U-boat ace, Triad, London, 1986.
- Sharpe, Peter (1998). U-Boat Fact File. Great Britain: Midland Publishing. ISBN 1-85780-072-9.
