= HMS Salopian =

UK passenger liner that became an armed merchant cruiser

- Shropshire, probably in the Scheldt

History

United Kingdom
- Name: 1926: Shropshire; 1939: HMS Salopian
- Namesake: Shropshire
- Owner: Bibby Line
- Operator: 1939: (United Kingdom) Admiralty
- Port of registry: 1926: (United Kingdom) Liverpool
- Route: Great Britain – Rangoon
- Builder: Fairfield S&E, Govan
- Yard number: 619
- Launched: 10 June 1926
- Completed: October 1926
- Identification: UK official number 149601; until 1933: code letters KVJL; by 1930: call sign GMTN; 1939: pennant number F94
- Fate: sunk by torpedo, 1941

General characteristics
- Type: 1926: passenger ship; 1939: armed merchant cruiser
- Tonnage: 10,560 GRT, 6,629 NRT
- Length: 483.6 ft (147.4 m)
- Beam: 60.3 ft (18.4 m)
- Draught: 29 ft 1 1/4 in (8.87 m)
- Depth: 31.8 ft (9.7 m)
- Decks: 3
- Installed power: 2,196 NHP
- Propulsion: 2 × two-stroke diesel engines; 2 × screws
- Speed: 15 1/2 knots (28.7 km/h)
- Complement: 281 (as AMC)
- Sensors & processing systems: as built: submarine signalling; by 1928: wireless direction finding
- Armament: 6 × 6-inch (150 mm) guns; 2 × 3-inch (76 mm) guns
- Notes: sister ships: Cheshire, Staffordshire, Worcestershire, Derbyshire

HMS Salopian was a motor ship that was built in 1926 as the passenger ship Shropshire. She belonged to Bibby Line, which ran passenger and cargo services between Rangoon in Burma (now Yangon in Myanmar) and various ports in Great Britain, via the Suez Canal and Gibraltar. The Admiralty requisitioned Shropshire in 1939, had her converted into an armed merchant cruiser, and renamed her Salopian. A German U-boat sank her in the Battle of the Atlantic in 1941.

She was the second of five Bibby Line ships to be named after the English county of Shropshire. The first was a steamship that was built in 1891 and sold in 1909. The third was a motor ship that was built in 1959 and sold in 1972. The fourth was built in 1968 as Verdala, acquired in 1974 and renamed Shropshire, and sold in 1977. The fifth was built in 1985 as Stainless Fighter, bought in 1991 and renamed Shropshire.

The second Shropshire was the first of five sister ships that the Fairfield Shipbuilding and Engineering Company of Govan in Glasgow built for Bibby Line. She was followed by Cheshire in 1927, Staffordshire in 1929, Worcestershire in 1931, and Derbyshire in 1935.

== Shropshire ==
Fairfield built Shropshire as yard number 619, launched her on 10 June 1926, and completed her that October. Her registered length was 483.6 ft (147.4 m), her beam was 60.3 ft (18.4 m), her depth was 31.8 ft (9.7 m) and her draught was 29 ft 1 1/4 in (8.87 m). Her tonnages were 10,560 gross register tons (GRT) and 6,629 net register tons (NRT). She was completed with four masts, like all Bibby ships of her era.

Shropshire had twin screws, each driven by a Sulzer eight-cylinder two-stroke diesel engine. The combined power of her twin engines was rated at 2,196 nominal horsepower, and gave her a speed of 15 1/2 knots (28.7 km/h; 17.8 mph).

As built, Shropshire's navigation equipment included submarine signalling. By 1928 she was also equipped with wireless direction finding.

Bibby Line registered Shropshire at Liverpool. Her United Kingdom official number was 149601 and her code letters were KVJL. By 1930 her call sign was GMTN. In 1934 this superseded her code letters.

== HMS Salopian ==
In September 1939 the Admiralty requisitioned Shropshire for conversion into an armed merchant cruiser (AMC). Her primary armament was six 6-inch (150 mm) guns, and her secondary armament was two 3-inch (76 mm) guns. The Royal Navy already had an HMS Shropshire, so the AMC was commissioned on 18 September as HMS Salopian, with the pennant number F94. Her first commander was Captain John Farquharson.

Salopian was assigned to the South Atlantic Station from October 1939 until January 1940, the Northern Patrol from February to August 1940, the Northern and Western Patrol from November 1940 to February 1941, the Bermuda and Halifax Task Force from March to April 1941, and the North Atlantic Task Force in May 1941. Between November 1939 and November 1940 she took part in the escort of four SL convoys from Freetown in Sierra Leone to Britain, and one OG convoy from Britain to Gibraltar. On 1 March 1940 Captain Sir John Alleyne, DSO, DSC succeeded Farquharson as her commander.

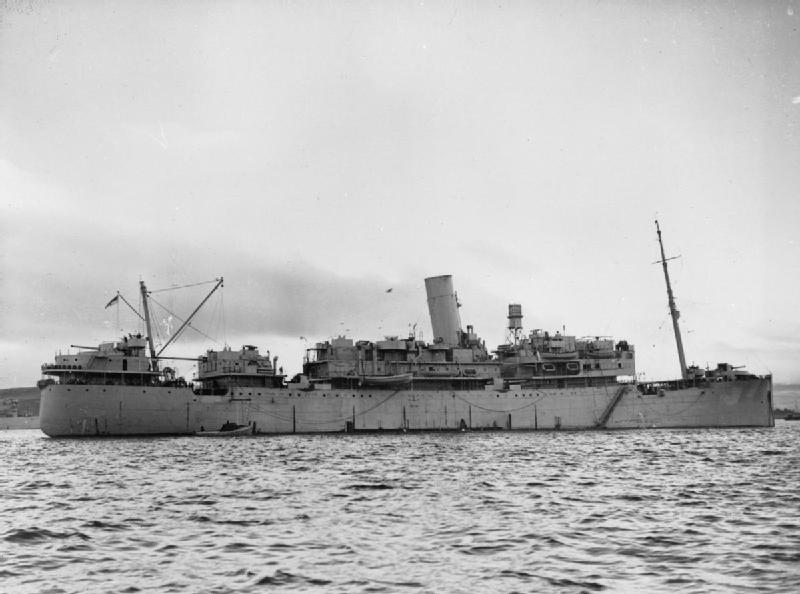
Salopian's sister ship HMS Cheshire

On 8 October 1940 Salopian and her sister ship Cheshire were on patrol when enemy aircraft attacked Convoy WS 3 (Fast), which was assembling in home waters to take seven troopships from Britain to Suez. Enemy aircraft attacked the troopships Capetown Castle and Oronsay. Salopian and Cheshire came to assist. Cheshire stayed with the convoy, but Salopian resumed her patrol.

In 1941 Salopian formed part of the escort of transatlantic convoy SC 27, which left Sydney, Nova Scotia on 30 March. Salopian detached from SC 27 on 12 March, and the convoy reached Britain on 18 March.

== Loss ==
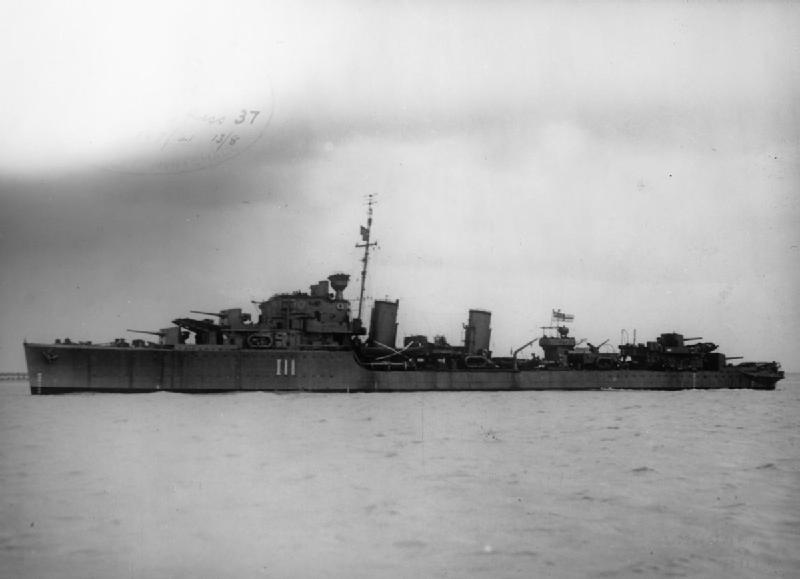
HMS Impulsive, which rescued Salopian's survivors

On 29 April 1941 Salopian left Sydney, Nova Scotia, as part of the escort of convoy SC 30. At 0400 hrs on 13 May 1941 the convoy was about 400 nautical miles (740 km) southeast of Cape Farewell, Greenland when the German submarine U-98 fired two torpedoes at Salopian. However, the AMC was zig-zagging every seven to twelve minutes, so both torpedoes missed. U-98 fired a third torpedo at 0619 and a fourth at 0622, but these also missed. Fog also impaired U-98's attack.

At 0725 hrs U-98 attacked on the surface, firing two more torpedoes. Both hit Salopian: one in her bow and the other amidships. Salopian returned fire, and U-98 dived. Salopian launched ten lifeboats, and a motor boat which laid a smoke screen in an attempt to protect the ship. At 1043 hrs U-98 fired a final torpedo as a coup de grâce. This hit Salopian amidships, broke her in two, and sank both parts at position 56°43′N 38°57′W.

Two of Salopian's ratings and one of her officers were killed. The destroyer HMS Impulsive rescued 278 survivors. They were landed at Hvalfjörður in Allied-occupied Iceland, and then repatriated to the UK.

== Bibliography ==
- Lloyd's Register of Shipping. Vol. II.–Steamers and Motorships. London: Lloyd's Register of Shipping. 1927 – via Internet Archive.
- Lloyd's Register of Shipping. Vol. II.–Steamers and Motorships. London: Lloyd's Register of Shipping. 1928 – via Internet Archive.
- Lloyd's Register of Shipping (PDF). Vol. II.–Steamers and Motorships of 300 tons gross and over. London: Lloyd's Register of Shipping. 1934 – via Southampton City Council.
- Mercantile Navy List. London. 1927 – via Crew List Index Project.
- Mercantile Navy List. London. 1930 – via Crew List Index Project.
- Osborne, Richard; Spong, Harry; Grover, Tom (2007). Armed Merchant Cruisers 1878–1945. Windsor, UK: World Ship Society. ISBN 978-0-9543310-8-5.
- Talbot-Booth, EC (1936). Ships and the Sea (Third ed.). London: Sampson Low, Marston & Co Ltd.
