= Spreewald (ship) =

Ships named after the Spreewald in Lusatia include:

- HMS Lucia, completed in 1908 as Spreewald, captured and renamed in 1915.
- MV Spreewald, completed in 1923, sunk in 1942.
- A third Spreewald was completed in 1951 and scrapped in 1979.
