= German submarine U-214 =

German World War II submarine

History

Nazi Germany
- Name: U-214
- Ordered: 16 February 1940
- Builder: Germaniawerft, Kiel
- Yard number: 646
- Laid down: 5 October 1940
- Launched: 18 September 1941
- Commissioned: 1 November 1941
- Fate: Sunk, 26 July 1944

General characteristics
- Class & type: Type VIID submarine
- Displacement: 965 tonnes (950 long tons) surfaced; 1,080 t (1,060 long tons) submerged
- Length: 76.90 m (252 ft 4 in) o/a; 59.80 m (196 ft 2 in) pressure hull
- Beam: 6.38 m (20 ft 11 in) o/a; 4.70 m (15 ft 5 in) pressure hull
- Height: 9.70 m (31 ft 10 in)
- Draught: 5.01 m (16 ft 5 in)
- Installed power: 2,800–3,200 PS (2,100–2,400 kW; 2,800–3,200 bhp) (diesels); 750 PS (550 kW; 740 shp) (electric)
- Propulsion: 2 shafts; 2 × diesel engines; 2 × electric motors
- Speed: 16–16.7 knots (29.6–30.9 km/h; 18.4–19.2 mph) surfaced; 7.3 knots (13.5 km/h; 8.4 mph) submerged
- Range: 11,200 nmi (20,700 km; 12,900 mi) at 10 knots (19 km/h; 12 mph) surfaced; 69 nmi (128 km; 79 mi) at 4 knots (7.4 km/h; 4.6 mph) submerged
- Test depth: 200 m (660 ft); Crush depth: 220–240 m (720–790 ft)
- Crew: 4 officers, 40 enlisted
- Armament: 5 × 53.3 cm (21 in) torpedo tubes (four bow, one stern); 12 × torpedoes or 26 × TMA or 39 × TMB tube-launched mines; 5 × vertical launchers with 15 SMA mines; 1 × 8.8 cm (3.46 in) deck gun (220 rounds); 1 × 20 mm AA (4,380 rounds)

Service record
- Part of: 5th U-boat Flotilla; 1 November 1941 – 30 April 1942; 9th U-boat Flotilla; 1 May 1942 – 26 July 1944
- Identification codes: M 31 973
- Commanders: Kptlt. Günther Reeder; 1 November 1941 – 10 May 1943; Oblt.z.S. / Kptlt. Rupprecht Stock; 7 May 1943 – July 1944; Oblt.z.S. Gerhard Conrad; July 1944 – 26 July 1944
- Operations: 10 patrols: 1st patrol: a. 18 – 20 May 1942; b. 21 May – 2 June 1942; c. 3 – 4 June 1942; 2nd patrol: a. 13 – 17 June 1942; b. 17 – 18 June 1942; 3rd patrol: 9 August – 9 October 1942; 4th patrol: 30 November 1942 – 24 February 1943; 5th patrol: 4 – 10 May 1943; 6th patrol: 18 May – 26 June 1943; 7th patrol: 22 August – 30 November 1943; 8th patrol: a. 12 – 15 February 1944; b. 19 February – 29 April 1944; 9th patrol: a. 11 – 14 June 1944; b. 17 June – 2 July 1944; 10th patrol: 22 – 26 July 1944
- Victories: 3 merchant ships sunk (18,266 GRT); 1 warship sunk (1,525 GRT); 1 merchant ship damaged (6,507 GRT); 1 auxiliary warship damaged (10,552 GRT)

German submarine U-214, was a Type VIID mine-laying U-boat of Nazi Germany's Kriegsmarine during World War II.

Laid down on 5 October 1940 by Germaniawerft in Kiel, the boat was commissioned on 1 November 1941 with Kapitänleutnant Günther Reeder (Crew 35) in command. She trained with the 5th U-boat Flotilla from 1 November 1941 until 30 April 1942, and was then assigned to the 9th U-boat Flotilla from 1 May 1942. She was sunk on 26 July 1944 by a British warship.

The wreck of U-214 was found by the archaeologist Innes McCartney in 2006 at the location reported by the Allies after the war.

== Design ==
As one of the six German Type VIID submarines, U-214 had a displacement of 965 tonnes (950 long tons) when at the surface and 1,080 tonnes (1,060 long tons) while submerged. She had a total length of 76.90 m (252 ft 4 in), a pressure hull length of 59.80 m (196 ft 2 in), a beam of 6.38 m (20 ft 11 in), a height of 9.70 m (31 ft 10 in), and a draught of 5.01 m (16 ft 5 in). The submarine was powered by two Germaniawerft F46 supercharged four-stroke, six-cylinder diesel engines producing a total of 2,800 to 3,200 metric horsepower (2,060 to 2,350 kW; 2,760 to 3,160 shp) for use while surfaced, two AEG GU 460/8-276 double-acting electric motors producing a total of 750 shaft horsepower (760 PS; 560 kW) for use while submerged. She had two shafts and two 1.23 m (4 ft) propellers. The boat was capable of operating at depths of up to 230 metres (750 ft).

The submarine had a maximum surface speed of 16–16.7 knots (29.6–30.9 km/h; 18.4–19.2 mph) and a maximum submerged speed of 7.3 knots (13.5 km/h; 8.4 mph). When submerged, the boat could operate for 69 nautical miles (128 km; 79 mi) at 4 knots (7.4 km/h; 4.6 mph); when surfaced, she could travel 11,200 nautical miles (20,700 km; 12,900 mi) at 10 knots (19 km/h; 12 mph). U-14 was fitted with five 53.3 cm (21 in) torpedo tubes (four fitted at the bow and one at the stern), twelve torpedoes, one 8.8 cm (3.46 in) SK C/35 naval gun, 220 rounds, and an anti-aircraft gun, in addition to five mine tubes with fifteen SMA mines. The boat had a complement of around forty-four.

== Service history ==
=== First and second patrol ===
U-214 sailed from Kiel on 18 May 1942, arriving at Kristiansand in Norway on the 20th. She sailed the next day, heading for Brest in France. On 22 May while in the North Sea, she was attacked by an aircraft, and slightly damaged by three bombs. The U-boat arrived at Lorient, also in France, on 2 June, and sailed to Brest the next day.

Her second patrol began on 13 June, On 16 June at 03:44, she was strafed, and attacked with three depth charges dropped by a Leigh light-equipped aircraft in the Bay of Biscay. The U-boat fought off a second attack with her flak defenses but sustained damage, forcing her return to Lorient on 17 June.

=== Third patrol ===
Not until her third patrol did U-214 score a victory. On 9 August 1942 she sailed from Brest, and on 18 August attacked Convoy SL-118, west of Portugal, sinking the 6,318 GRT Dutch cargo ship Balingkar and the 7,522 GRT British cargo ship Hatarana. She also damaged the armed merchant cruiser HMS Cheshire. She returned to Brest on 9 October after 62 days at sea.

=== Fourth and fifth patrols ===
U-214's fourth patrol took her to the Caribbean Sea where she attacked the 4,426 GRT unescorted Polish merchant ship Paderewski with torpedoes 40 nautical miles (74 km; 46 mi) off Trinidad before sinking her with gunfire. The U-boat returned to her homeport on 24 February 1943 after a voyage of 87 days.

U-214's fifth patrol was ended after only three days at sea when she was attacked on 7 May 1943 by a British Halifax bomber of 58 Squadron RAF in the Bay of Biscay. The U-boat crash-dived, suffering only minor damage, but commander Kptlt. Günther Reeder was severely wounded, resulting in first Officer Oberleutnant zur See Rupprecht Stock (Crew IV/37) bringing the U-boat safely back to base.

=== Sixth patrol ===
Now under Stock's command, U-214 sailed from Brest on 18 May 1943, heading for the coast of West Africa. There, on 20 June, the American 6,507 GRT merchant ship Santa Maria struck a mine laid by U-214 five nautical miles (9.3 km; 5.8 mi) west of Dakar, blowing off her bows. After abandoning ship, she was later re-boarded by her crew and towed to Dakar for repairs. The U-boat arrived back at Brest on 26 June.

=== Seventh patrol ===
U-214's seventh patrol took her to the waters off Panama. While outbound on 9 September, 92 nautical miles (170 km; 106 mi) south-west of Santa Maria, Azores, she was attacked by an American Grumman TBF Avenger aircraft from the escort carrier Croatan (CVE-25). The aircraft approached by radar and dropped four depth charges, but was damaged in the air intake and the bomb bay by the U-boat's flak. One depth charge hit the U-boat, but bounced off and exploded harmlessly.

On 8 October, five miles off Colón, U-214 laid a field of 15 mines. The mine field was discovered the next day and sweeping operations were immediately begun. At 7:35 pm local on 12 October while still in the central Caribbean, U-214 deployed one type EMS 1 floating mine in her wake. At 8:57 pm local the crew observed a yellow flare off in the distance at approximately 050° true. This flare was dropped by a USN PBM Mariner aircraft of squadron VP-210 attacking another submarine. At 10:40 pm local the submarine was attacked by the same PBM that had earlier dropped the flare. The submarine's crew drove off the aircraft by firing on it. No damage was sustained by U-214. The submarine returned home on 30 November after 101 days at sea.

=== Eighth and ninth patrol ===
U-214's next patrol, from 12 February – 29 April 1944, took her south to the west African coast, but without success. The U-boat was then fitted with a schnorkel before returning to active service. U-214 headed north into the shallow waters of the English Channel on 11 June, under the command of the newly promoted Kapitänleutnant Stock, however she had no successes, and the patrol was curtailed after the U-boat was attacked by a British B-24 Liberator of 224 Squadron, sustaining damage which forced her to return to Brest on 2 July.

=== Tenth patrol and loss ===
U-214 sailed from Brest on 22 July 1944 under the command of 21-year-old Oblt.z.S. Gerhard Conrad (Crew XII/39), one of the youngest U-boat commanders of World War II. After only five days, on 26 July, the U-boat was sunk in the English Channel at 49°58′N 03°30′W by depth charges from the Captain-class frigate HMS Cooke. All 48 hands were lost.

=== Wolfpacks ===
U-214 took part in two wolfpacks, namely:

- Blücher (14 – 28 August 1942)
- Iltis (6 – 23 September 1942)

== Summary of raiding history ==
Date	Ship Name	Nationality	Tonnage (Note: Merchant ship tonnages are in gross register tons. Military vessels are listed by tons displacement.)	Fate
18 August 1942	Balingkar	Netherlands	6,318	Sunk
18 August 1942	Hatarana	United Kingdom	7,522	Sunk
18 August 1942	HMS Cheshire	Royal Navy	10,552	Damaged
30 December 1942	Paderwski	Poland	4,426	Sunk
20 June 1943	Santa Maria	United States	6,507	Damaged (Mine)

== Bibliography ==
- Busch, Rainer; Röll, Hans-Joachim (1999). German U-boat commanders of World War II : a biographical dictionary. Translated by Brooks, Geoffrey. London, Annapolis, Md: Greenhill Books, Naval Institute Press. ISBN 1-55750-186-6.
- Busch, Rainer; Röll, Hans-Joachim (1999). Deutsche U-Boot-Verluste von September 1939 bis Mai 1945 [German U-boat losses from September 1939 to May 1945]. Der U-Boot-Krieg (in German). Vol. IV. Hamburg, Berlin, Bonn: Mittler. ISBN 3-8132-0514-2.
- Gröner, Erich; Jung, Dieter; Maass, Martin (1991). U-boats and Mine Warfare Vessels. German Warships 1815–1945. Vol. 2. Translated by Thomas, Keith; Magowan, Rachel. London: Conway Maritime Press. ISBN 0-85177-593-4.
- McCartney, Innes (2002). Lost patrols : submarine wrecks of the English Channel. Penzance: Periscope. ISBN 978-1-90438-104-4.
