= SS Paderewski =

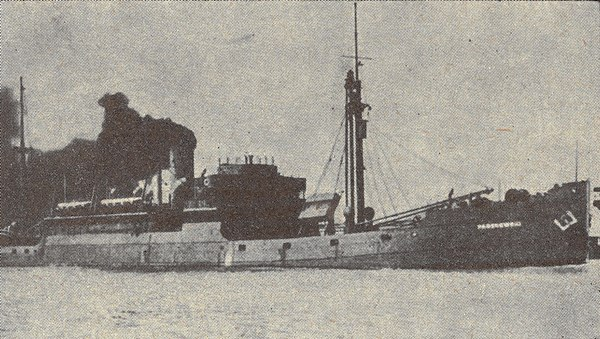

History

Poland
- Name: Paderewski
- Namesake: Ignacy Jan Paderewski
- Owner: Gdynia-America Line
- Port of registry: Gdynia
- Builder: International Shipbuilding Co, Pascagoula
- Launched: 1920
- Completed: September 1941
- Commissioned: 20 September 1941
- Fate: Sunk 30 December 1942

General characteristics
- Type: Cargo ship
- Tonnage: 4,426 GRT; 2,693 NRT; 7,084 DWT
- Length: 112.9 m (370 ft 5 in) pp.
- Beam: 15.9 m (52 ft 2 in)
- Draft: 8.3 m (27 ft 3 in)
- Installed power: 2,800 ihp (2,100 kW)
- Propulsion: triple expansion steam engine, 1 screw
- Speed: ~9 knots (17 km/h; 10 mph)
- Crew: 36

SS Paderewski was a Polish general cargo ship of World War II period, built in 1920 in the United States, but not completed before 1941. She was sold to Gdynia America Line (GAL) and named in honour of the pianist and politician Ignacy Jan Paderewski. She was sunk on 30 December 1942 by the German submarine U-214 near Trinidad, with the loss of three lives.

During early World War II, Polish Merchant Navy, operating from the United Kingdom and subordinated to Polish government-in-exile, had difficulties with acquiring new ships to replace lost vessels, due to British restrictions and great demand of ships. The first newly acquired ship was the Paderewski, built in the United States.

The ship's hull was built and launched in 1920 by International Shipbuilding Co in Pascagoula, Mississippi. She was ordered for Italy as Trieste, along with sisterships Trento and Torino, but all three had not been completed and were laid up on the Mobile River near Mobile, Alabama. In the meantime her owner became Panama-registered Greek company Victor Rose de Vapores. The hull was in good condition, and its completion was deemed justified. On 9 April 1941 the hull was bought by Gdynia America Line for US$300,000. She was completed by Waterman Steamship Corporation in Mobile, using triple expansion steam engine bought from Canada and used oil-burning boilers. Total cost rose to US$1,085,785, with most of the money coming from selling gold reserves of Polish government in the United States. Due to high cost, the ship's acquiring became a subject of investigation by Polish Supreme Audit Office, but ship prices were even higher at that time, and finally the Paderewski brought some 45,000 pound sterling of profit, including insurance.

The ship was commissioned on 20 September 1941 in Mobile, under master Jerzy Mieszkowski. Her port of registry was Gdynia, which the ship never could see. During the first voyage from New Orleans to Buenos Aires she ran aground on a reef near Havana on 1 October 1941, continued the voyage with provisional leak fixing with a cement. In January 1942 she returned to New York and was repaired by Bethlehem Steel in Hoboken, New Jersey. Initially the ship was too slow, but after replacing of the screw after her first or second voyage, she made around 9–10 knots (17–19 km/h; 10–12 mph). The second and third voyages was to South America as well, during increasing threat of German submarines in that area. During third voyage, on 11 June 1942 she rescued 35 survivors from the ship Pleasantville sunk three days earlier by the German submarine 1941 west of the Bermudas.

On 30 September 1942 the Paderewski sailed in a convoy to Belém in Brasília. She took some 4500 tons of raw materials there, but she damaged a screw in unknown circumstances. The ship could only make 3–4 knots (5.6–7.4 km/h; 3.5–4.6 mph) and sailed alone on 24 December towards Trinidad, where it was hoped to dock the ship. On 30 December 1942, some 20 miles (32 km) east of Trinidad, around 3:30 AM the ship was torpedoed by German submarine U-214. One torpedo missed, but second struck the starboard near machine room. Of 41 crewmen, including four British artillerymen, three man were killed in machine room. The ship was abandoned due to danger of further attacks or boiler explosion, but the survivors remained nearby on two boats and a raft. Around 4:20 the submarine surfaced, swam by one of lifeboats and shelled the ship, causing fire. The submarine did not attempt to capture the captain nor ship documents and sailed away. According to captain Mieszkowski, the ship sank around 5:30 AM near . Sailing fishing boat appeared and started to haul the lifeboats, then the survivors were rescued by two US Navy patrol craft.
