= HMS Worcestershire =

UK passenger ship and WW2 naval ship

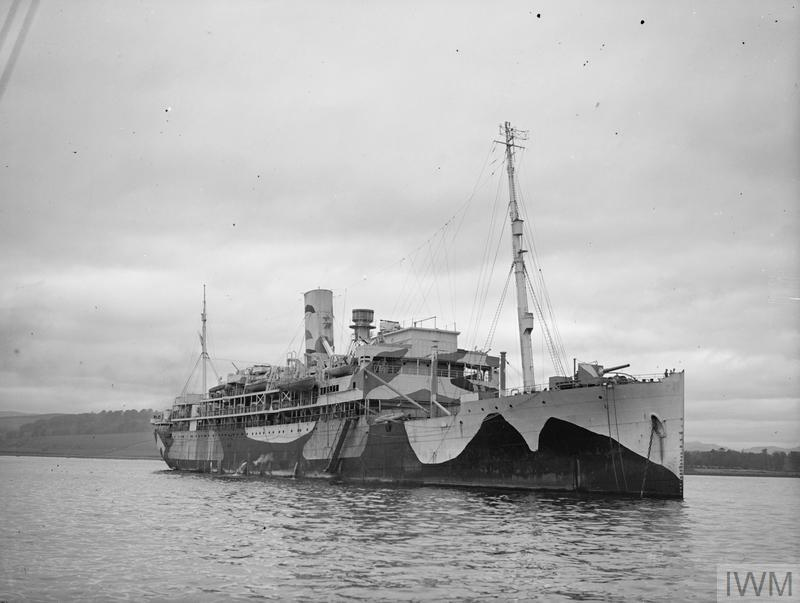
- HMS Worcestershire at Greenock in 1943

History

United Kingdom
- Name: Worcestershire
- Namesake: Worcestershire
- Owner: Bibby Line
- Operator: 1931: Bibby Bros & Co; 1939: (United Kingdom) Royal Navy
- Port of registry: (United Kingdom) Liverpool
- Route: Liverpool – Suez Canal – Rangoon
- Builder: Fairfield Shipbuilding and Engineering Company
- Yard number: 640
- Launched: 8 October 1930
- Completed: 5 February 1931
- Acquired: for Royal Navy, 17 September 1939
- Commissioned: into Royal Navy, 22 November 1939
- Decommissioned: from Royal Navy, October 1947
- Maiden voyage: 6 March 1931
- Refit: 1939, 1948
- Identification: UK official number 162334; until 1933: code letters LGTM; call sign GFZM; 1939: pennant number F 29
- Fate: Scrapped in Osaka, 1962

General characteristics
- Type: 1931: passenger ship; 1939: armed merchant cruiser; 1943: troopship; 1944: landing ship, infantry
- Tonnage: 1934: 11,376 GRT, 7,108 NRT; 1955: 10,329 GRT, 6,108 NRT
- Length: 501 ft 6 in (152.86 m) overall; 483.0 ft (147.2 m) registered
- Beam: 64.2 ft (19.6 m)
- Draught: 29 ft 9 1/4 in (9.07 m)
- Depth: 32.0 ft (9.8 m)
- Decks: 3
- Installed power: 2 × two-stroke diesel engines; 2,196 NHP; 3,800 bhp
- Propulsion: 2 × screws
- Speed: 16 knots (30 km/h) maximum
- Capacity: passengers: 1931: 250 × 1st class; 1949: 100 × 1st class; cargo: included 1,340 cu ft (38 m^{3}) refrigerated
- Troops: 1943: 2,000
- Crew: 1931: 200
- Sensors & processing systems: as built: wireless direction finding; by 1940: as above, plus echo sounding device; by 1946: as above, plus radar
- Armament: as AMC: 8 × 5.9-inch (150 mm) calibre naval guns
- Notes: sister ships: Shropshire, Cheshire, Staffordshire, Derbyshire

HMS Worcestershire was a motor ship. She was built in Scotland in 1931 as MV Worcestershire for Bibby Line. Her regular route was between Liverpool and Rangoon (now Yangon) via the Suez Canal. In 1939 she was converted into an armed merchant cruiser, and commissioned as HMS Worcestershire (F 29). In 1941 she survived being torpedoed in the Battle of the Atlantic. In 1943 she was converted into a troopship, and by 1944 she was a landing ship, infantry. She took part in the Normandy landings, and after the Second World War she repatriated Allied prisoners of war from the Far East. In 1947 she was refitted and returned to civilian service as a passenger ship. She was scrapped in Japan in 1962.

She was the second of four Bibby Line ships to be named after Worcestershire. The first was a steamship that was built in 1904 and sunk in 1917. The third was a cargo motor ship that was built in 1965, sold and renamed in 1976, and scrapped in 1981. The fourth was an ore-bulk-oil carrier that was built in 1973 as English Bridge, renamed Worcestershire in 1977, sold and renamed in 1979, and was wrecked as Kowloon Bridge in 1986.

== A class of five ships ==
Between 1926 and 1935, the Fairfield Shipbuilding and Engineering Company in Govan, Glasgow, built a class of five twin-screw passenger motor ships for Bibby Line. Shropshire was completed in 1926; Cheshire in 1927; Staffordshire in 1929; Worcestershire in 1931; and Derbyshire in 1935. They were similar in length; depth; engines; and passenger capacity. Each had four masts, which had remained a Bibby tradition decades after the Age of Sail. Derbyshire was the last Bibby Line ship to be built with four masts.

One difference between members of the class was beam. In Shropshire and Cheshire it was 60.2 ft (18.3 m). It was increased to 62.2 ft (19.0 m) in Staffordshire; 64.2 ft (19.6 m) in Worcestershire; and 66.2 ft (20.2 m) in Derbyshire. This resulted in corresponding increases in tonnage.

== MV Worcestershire ==
Fairfield built Worcestershire as yard number 640. She was launched on 8 October 1930, and completed on 5 February 1931. Her lengths were 501 ft 6 in (152.86 m) overall and 483.0 ft (147.2 m) registered. Her beam was 64.2 ft (19.6 m); her depth was 32.0 ft (9.8 m); and her draught was 29 ft 9 1/4 in (9.07 m). She had berths for 250 passengers, all in first class, and her crew numbered about 200. A small part of her cargo capacity, 1,340 cu ft (38 m^{3}), was refrigerated. Her tonnages were 11,376 GRT and 7,108 NRT.

Each of her twin screws was driven by a Sulzer eight-cylinder, single-acting, two-stroke diesel engine. The combined power of her twin engines was rated at 2,196 NHP or 3,800 bhp. Her top speed was 16 knots (30 km/h), and her cruising speed was 14 1/2 knots (27 km/h).

Bibby Line registered Worcestershire at Liverpool. Her UK official number was 162334. Her code letters LGTM; her wireless telegraph call sign was GFZM; and by 1934, her call sign had superseded her code letters. Worcestershire was the first ship to have a Marconi Type 386 1500W radio transmitter. As built, she was equipped with wireless direction finding. By 1940, she was equipped also with an echo sounding device.

On 6 March 1931, Worcestershire left Liverpool on her maiden voyage, which was to Rangoon. This Bibby's main route, carrying passengers, mail, and cargo via Gibraltar, Marseille, the Suez Canal, Port Sudan, and Colombo. Return voyages were to London via Plymouth, instead of Liverpool. For most of the year, alternate voyages called at Cochin.

== Armed merchant cruiser ==
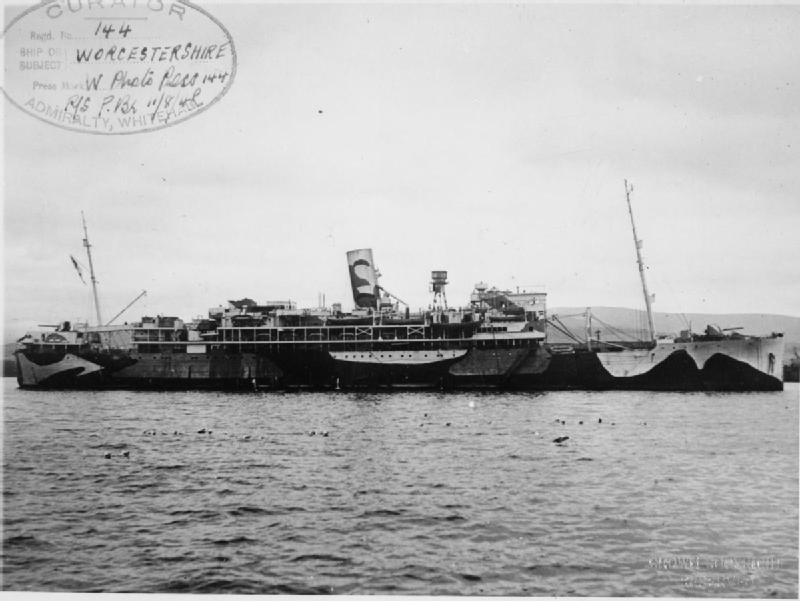
HMS Worcestershire

When the UK declared war on Germany on 3 September 1939, Worcestershire was in the eastern Mediterranean, on a return voyage from Burma. She completed her scheduled voyage via Gibraltar to London; discharged her cargo; and on 17 September was requisitioned for conversion into an armed merchant cruiser (AMC). She was armed with eight 5.9-inch (150 mm) calibre naval guns; and on 22 November was commissioned into the Royal Navy as HMS Worcestershire, with the pennant number F 29.

At first, HMS Worcestershire served with the Northern Patrol. Then, from late December 1940 until early March 1943, she escorted convoys, starting with HX 97 from Halifax, Nova Scotia, to Liverpool. On 8 February 1941 she left the UK carrying 31 boxes of gold to Canada. In March 1941 she escorted convoy BHX 114 from Bermuda, to join convoy HX 114 bound for home waters.

On 20 March 1941, Worcestershire, commanded by Acting Captain John Cresswell, RN, left Halifax as part of the escort of Convoy SC 26, which comprised 22 merchant ships bound for the British Isles. At dusk on 2 April, the Admiralty warned Cresswell that intelligence indicated a U-boat was shadowing the convoy. This was U-74, commanded by Eitel-Friedrich Kentrat. Kentrat asked permission to attack at sunset, but the Befehlshaber der U-Boote ordered him to wait for other U-boats, of which eight were in the area, to arrive to make a joint attack. This was launched at 00:30 hrs on 3 April, and sank six merchant ships. U-74 fired her last two torpedoes at Worcestershire. The first missed, but the second hit Worcestershire below her bridge.

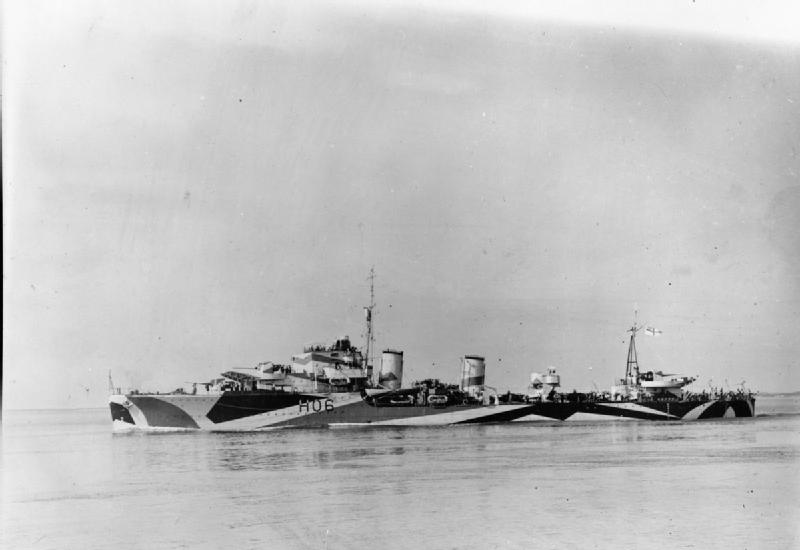
The destroyer HMS Hurricane

One seaman aboard Worcestershire was killed. Water rose in her two forward holds; fire broke out in her paint store; and her steering gear was jammed hard a-port. Cresswell ordered her to heave to for emergency repairs; an emergency steering system was rigged by 06:00 hrs; and at 13:00 hrs the destroyer HMS Hurricane arrived. At 14:22 hrs (Berlin time), U-69 tried to attack Worcestershire, but two destroyers chased her away. Worcestershire could move under her own power, but only slowly. For the next four days, Hurricane escorted the AMC as she slowly returned to Liverpool. In the meantime, the attack on SC 26 continued, and sank another four merchant ships.

Worcestershire was repaired and returned to service. In August 1941, she escorted Convoy HX 146 for its first few days out of Halifax. In February 1942 she escorted the troopship convoy WS 15A in the Indian Ocean from Durban to Aden. Her final convoys were OW 002/1 and OW 003/1, in March and April 1943.

== Troopship, and landing ship, infantry ==
In 1943, Worcestershire was converted into a troopship, with capacity for 2,000 men. By June 1944, she was a landing ship, infantry. She and three other Bibby liners, Cheshire, Devonshire, and Lancashire, formed Convoy EWP 1, which left London on 6 June (D-Day) carrying 10,000 troops. The next day, EWR 1 reached Normandy, where Worcestershire landed her troops on Juno Beach.

In September 1945, Worcestershire landed troops in the liberation of Malaya. After the surrender of Japan, she repatriated some of the first Far East prisoners of war liberated from Japan. By 1946, she was equipped with radar. She continued as a troopship, and was decommissioned from the Navy in October 1947, by which time she had carried 80,000 troops without loss.

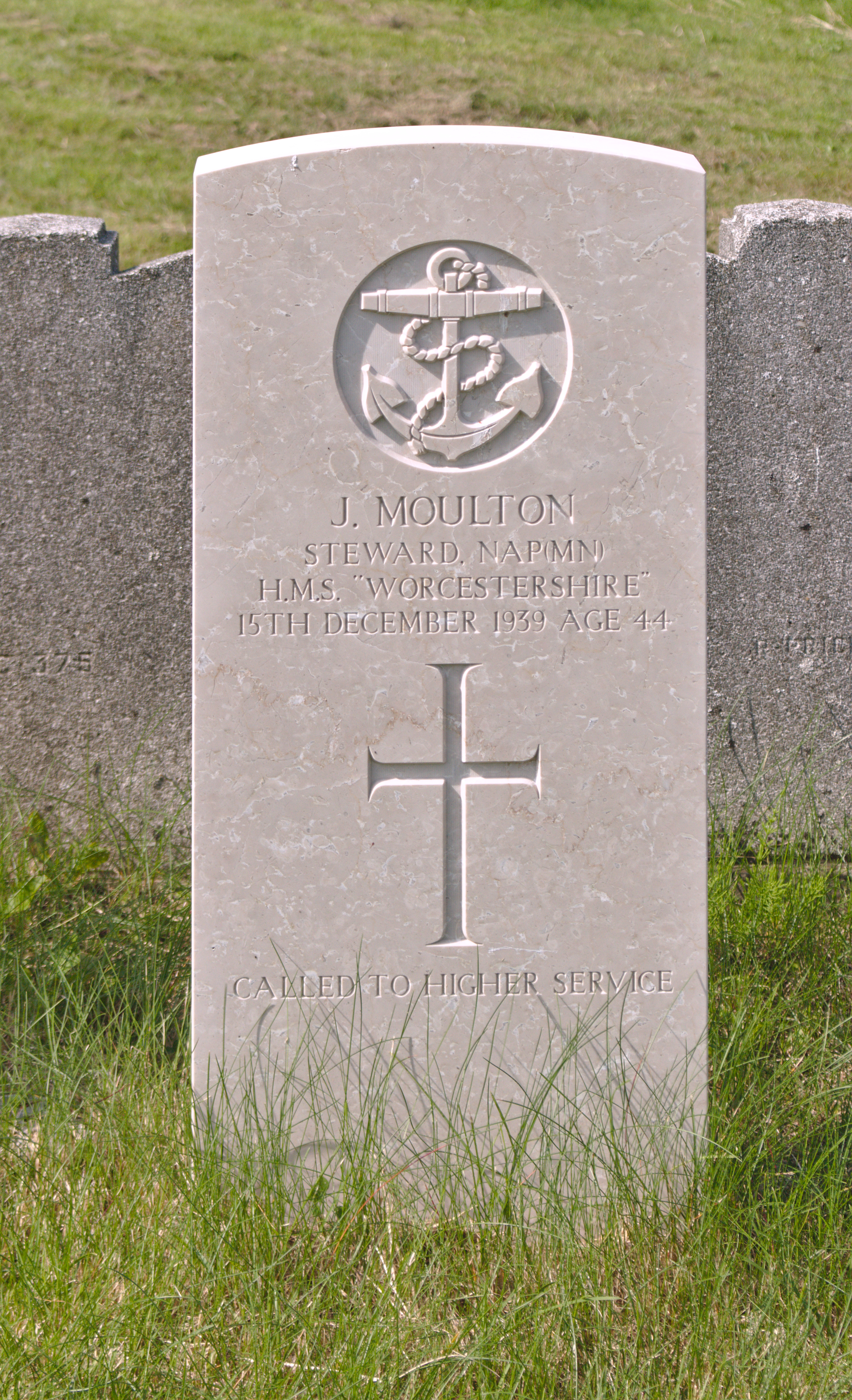
CWGC headstone of a steward of HMS Worcestershire in West Kirby, Wirral

In her eight years of Royal Navy service, four members of Worcestershire's crew died. A Merchant Navy steward died on 15 December 1939, and is buried in West Kirby on the Wirral. The body of the seaman killed in the torpedo attack on 3 April 1941, mentioned above, was never found, so he is listed on the Chatham Naval Memorial. Another seaman died on 10 April 1942, and is buried in Kirkee War Cemetery in Pune, India. A Merchant Navy leading steward died on 8 August 1946, and is buried in Everton Cemetery in Liverpool.

== Refit and post-war service ==
Fairfield refitted Worcestershire to return to civilian service. Three of her masts were removed; leaving only her foremast. The after part of her superstructure was removed, which reduced her passenger accommodation to 100 first class passengers. Her tall, slim funnel was replaced with a broader, more raked one, which modernised her appearance. The refit reduced her tonnages to 10,329 GRT and 6,108 NRT. She returned to civilian service in 1949, on the same route that she served in the 1930s. She was still on the same route in 1954.

In 1961, Bibby Line sold Worcestershire for scrap. She was broken up in Osaka, with work starting in January 1962.

== Bibliography ==
- Collard, Ian (2008). Ships of the Mersey: A Photographic History. Stroud: Amberley Publishing. ISBN 978-1-4456-2403-7.
- Collard, Ian (2013). The British Cruise Ship An Illustrated History 1844–1939. Stroud: Amberley Publishing. ISBN 978-1-4456-2130-2.
- Dunn, Laurence (1965). Passenger Liners. London: Adlard Coles – via Google Books.
- Edwards, Bernard (2002). Attack and Sink. Barnsley: Pen and Sword Books. ISBN 978-0-85052-868-8.
- Harnack, Edwin P (1949) [1903]. All About Ships & Shipping (8th ed.). London: Faber and Faber.
- Haws, Duncan (1995). The Burma Boats: Henderson and Bibby. Merchant Fleets. Vol. 29. Hereford: Travel Creatours Ltd Publications. ISBN 0-946378-26-6.
- Jordan, Roger W (1999). The World's Merchant Fleets, 1939: The Particulars and Wartime Fates of 6,000 Ships. London: Chatham Publishing. ISBN 978-1-86176-023-4.
- Lloyd's Register of Shipping. Vol. I.–Steamers and Motorships Under 300 Tons. London: Lloyd's Register of Shipping. 1931 – via Southampton City Council.
- Lloyd's Register of Shipping. Vol. II.–Steamers and Motorships of 300 Tons Gross and Over. London: Lloyd's Register of Shipping. 1934 – via Southampton City Council.
- Lloyd's Register of Shipping. Vol. I.–Steamers and Motorships of 300 Tons. London: Lloyd's Register of Shipping. 1940 – via Southampton City Council.
- Lloyd's Register of Shipping. Vol. Steamers and Motorships of 300 Tons Gross and Over. London: Lloyd's Register of Shipping. 1946 – via Internet Archive.
- Mercantile Navy List. London: Registrar General of Shipping and Seamen. 1932 – via Crew List Index Project.
- Miller, William H (1986). The Last Blue Water Liners. Conway Maritime Press. ISBN 978-0-85177-400-8.
- Nicholson, Gerald WL (1969). More Fighting Newfoundlanders: A History of Newfoundland's Fighting Forces in the Second World War. St John's, NL: Government of Newfoundland and Labrador.
- Osborne, Richard; Spong, Harry; Grover, Tom (2007). Armed Merchant Cruisers 1878–1945. Windsor: World Ship Society. ISBN 978-0-9543310-8-5.
- Pickford, Nigel (1999). Lost treasure ships of the twentieth century. Washington, DC: National Geographic. ISBN 978-0-7922-7472-8 – via Internet Archive.
- Poolman, Kenneth (1985). Armed Merchant Cruisers: Their Epic Story. London: Leo Cooper. ISBN 978-0-436-37706-8.
- Register Book. Vol. I Register of Ships. London: Lloyd's Register of Shipping. 1955 – via Internet Archive.
- Rubin, GR (1992). Durban 1942: A British Troopship Revolt. London: A & C Black. ISBN 978-1-85285-080-7.
- Talbot-Booth, Eric C (1936). A Cruising Companion: Ships and the Sea (Third ed.). New York: D. Appleton-Century & Co, Inc – via Google Books.
- Talbot-Booth, Eric C (1937). Waterline Ship Models. London: Sampson Low, Marston & Co Ltd – via Google Books.
- White, David F (2007). Bitter Ocean: The Battle of the Atlantic, 1939-1945. Simon and Schuster. ISBN 978-0-7432-2930-2.
