= RMMV Athlone Castle =

Motor ship

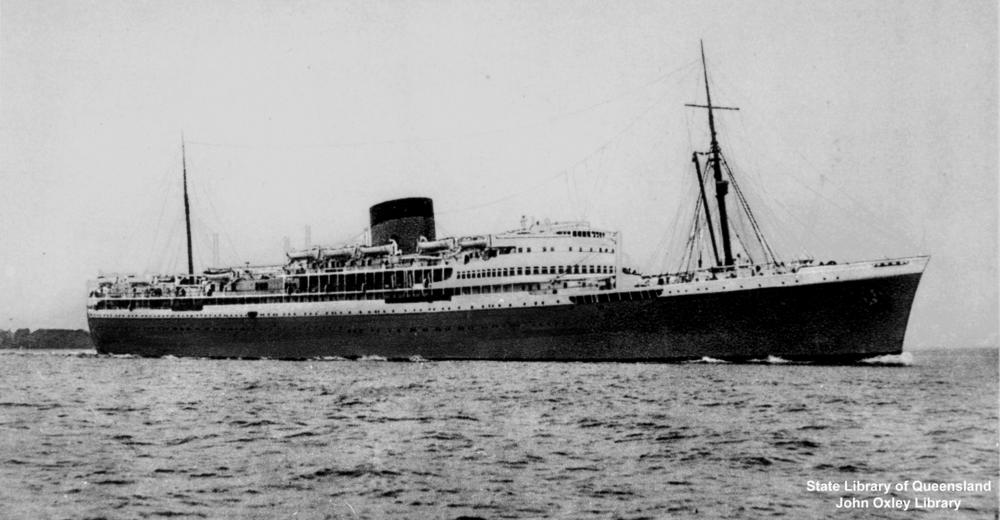

History

United Kingdom
- Name: RMMV Athlone Castle
- Operator: Union-Castle Line (1935-1940, 1946-1965); Royal Navy (1940-1946)
- Port of registry: London, UK
- Builder: Harland & Wolff, Belfast
- Yard number: 942
- Launched: 28 November 1935
- Completed: 13 May 1936
- Maiden voyage: 22 May 1936
- Out of service: 23 July 1965
- Fate: Scrapped, 1965

General characteristics
- Type: Passenger liner
- Tonnage: 25,564 GRT
- Length: 725 ft (221 m)
- Beam: 82 ft 6 in (25.15 m)
- Draught: 32 ft (9.8 m)
- Installed power: 28,000bhp
- Propulsion: 2 × 10-cylinder double acting two stroke cycle diesel engines
- Speed: 24 knots (44 km/h; 28 mph)
- Capacity: First Class: 246; Cabin Class: 538

RMMV Athlone Castle was a British passenger liner built by Harland & Wolff for the Union-Castle Line's mail service from Southampton to Cape Town, South Africa route. After she was launched on 28 November 1935, she sailed on her maiden voyage on 22 May 1936. She served as a troopship during World War Two and in 1965 was scrapped at Kaohsiung.

== Design ==
The 25,564 GRT motor ship Athlone Castle was built at the Harland & Wolff shipyard in Belfast, Northern Ireland. The ship, 220.98 metres long and 25.15 metres wide had a funnel, two masts, and two propellers. The ship was powered by two 10 cylinder Burmeister & Wain diesel engines developing 24,000 bhp and a speed of 19.5 knots. The passenger accommodations were designed for 246 passengers in first class and 538 in cabin class. The ship was named after the castle of the same name in Athlone (Ireland). The Athlone Castle was the sister ship of the identical RMMV Stirling Castle and RMMV Capetown Castle, which was also launched by Harland & Wolff on 15 July 1935, while Capetown Castle was launched on 23 September 1937.

== History ==
Launched on 28 November 1935, Athlone Castle was christened by Princess Alice, Countess of Athlone. The ship was completed on 13 May 1936. On 22 May 1936 the Athlone Castle left Southampton for her maiden voyage to Cape Town, where she arrived on 7 June. When she arrived in Cape Town on 14 April 1937, she had covered the distance in a new record time of 13 days and 51 minutes. On 5 November 1937 the Athlone Castle was the first mail ship to call at East London. In 1939 she was supposed to convey the England cricket team home from Durban after the 5th Test but, as the Timeless Test was continuing, she departed without them and they instead boarded at Cape Town.

On 27 December 1940 she was commissioned as a troop carrier demanded. In November 1942 she took part, among other things, in the North African campaign. In the six years that she served in the war, she carried a total of 148,113 people.

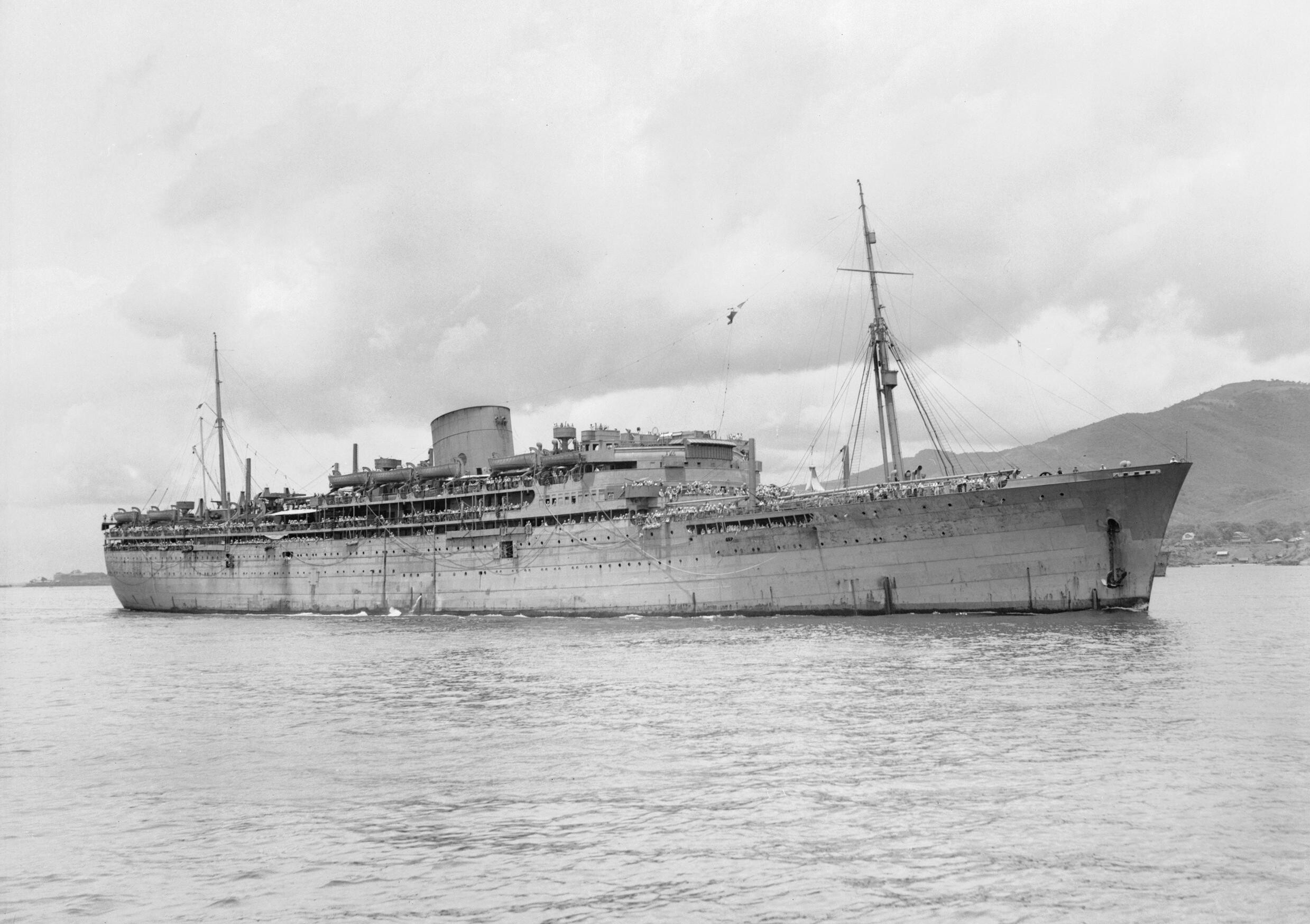
Athlone Castle during the Second World War

In 1946 she was used on two troop repatriation trips to Australia and one to Singapore. On 17 September 1946 she was handed over to Belfast for refurbishment. In May 1947, the Athlone Castle returned to the Union-Castle Line's postal service and for the following years sailed from England to South Africa as before the war.

=== Fate ===
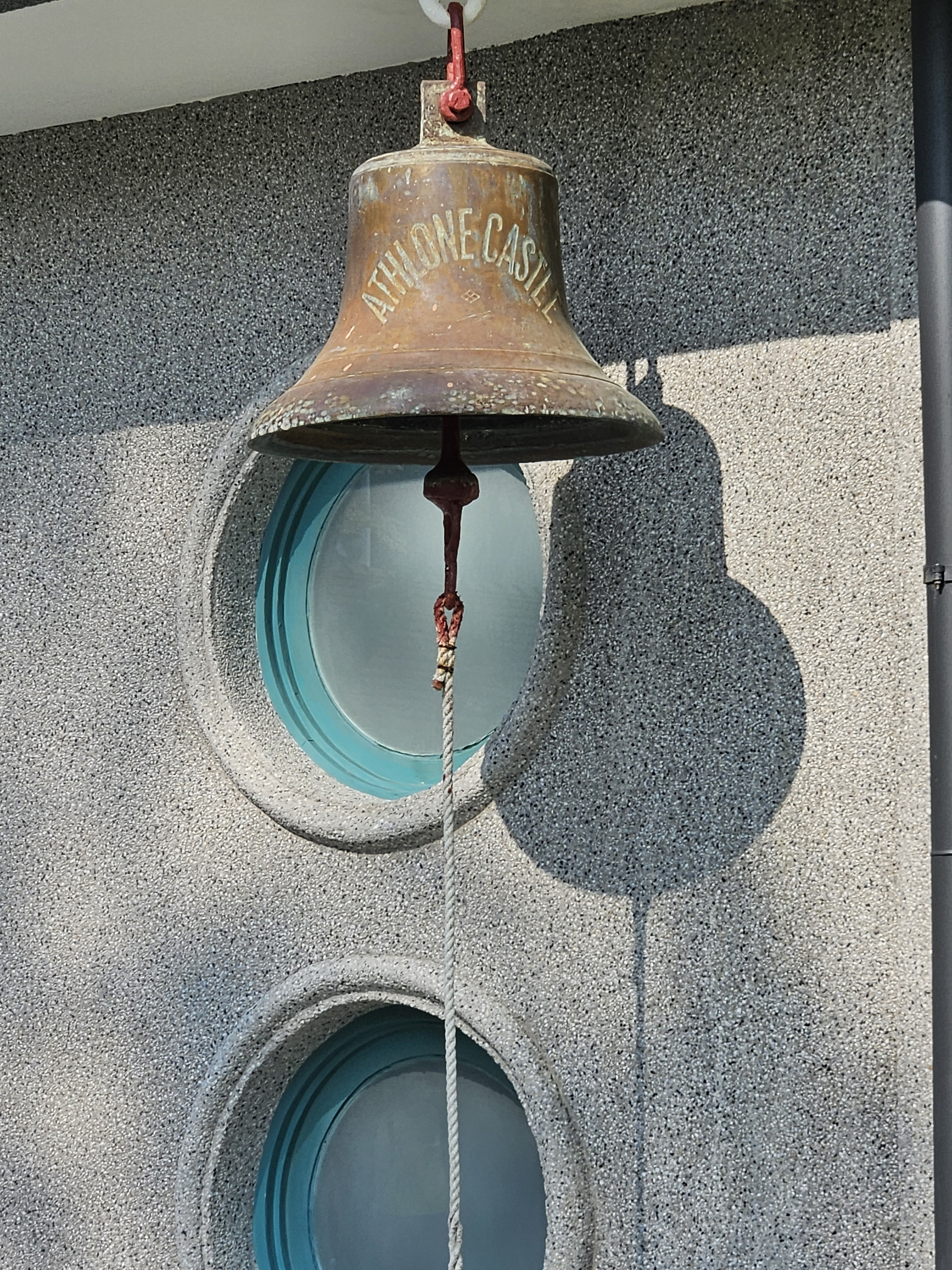
The Bell form RMMV Athlone Castle. It was used at Kaohsiung Plant of Formosa Plastics Group.

On 23 July 1965 she left Cape Town for the last time. She was then decommissioned after almost 30 years. Sailed from Southampton to Taiwan on 16 August 1965, and arrived in Kaohsiung for scrapping on 13 September 1965.
