= RMMV Stirling Castle =

British ocean liner (1935–1966)

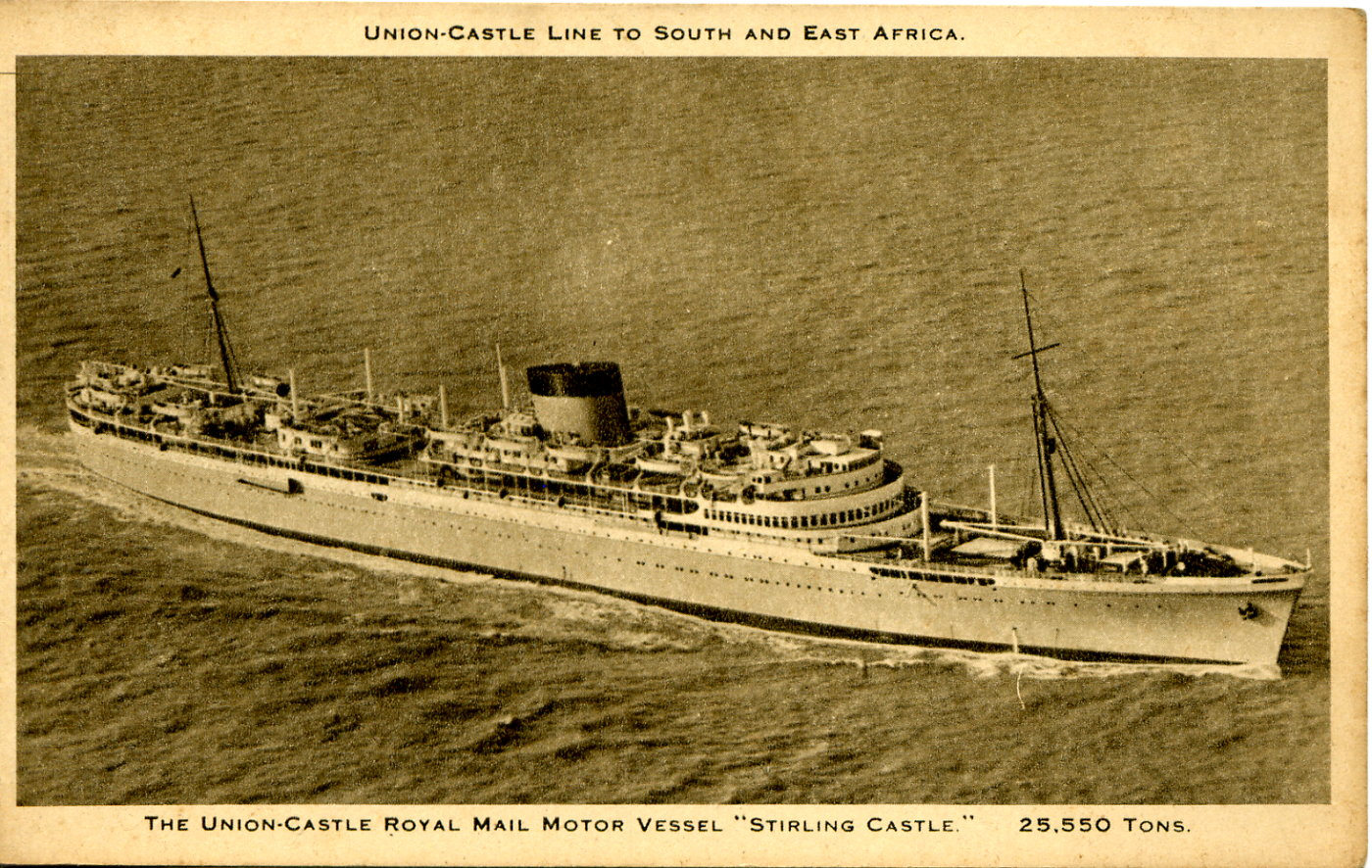

History

United Kingdom
- Name: RMMV Stirling Castle
- Namesake: Stirling Castle
- Operator: Union-Castle Mail Steamship Co.
- Port of registry: London, UK
- Route: Southampton, Las Palmas, Cape Town, Port Elizabeth, East London, Durban
- Builder: Harland & Wolff, Belfast, Northern Ireland
- Yard number: 941
- Laid down: 1 May 1934
- Launched: 15 August 1935
- Christened: Mrs Robertson Gibb
- Completed: 29 January 1936
- Maiden voyage: 7 February 1936
- Out of service: 30 November 1965
- Homeport: Southampton
- Fate: Broken up at Mihara, Japan, 1966

General characteristics
- Type: Passenger liner
- Tonnage: 25,550 gross register tons (GRT) (1946, 25,554 GRT)
- Length: 725 ft (221 m)
- Beam: 82 ft (25 m)
- Draught: 32 ft (9.8 m)
- Installed power: 4650 HP
- Propulsion: 2 Burmeister & Wain 10-cylinder, two-stroke double-acting marine diesels, twin screws.
- Speed: 20 knots (37 km/h; 23 mph)
- Capacity: As built, 297 1st class, 492 cabin class; 1946, 245 1st class, 538 tourist class

RMMV Stirling Castle was a British ocean liner of the Union-Castle Line built by Harland & Wolff in Belfast for the Southampton to South Africa mail service. She was launched on 15 August 1935 and was the first of two identical sister ships, being joined a few months later by the Athlone Castle.

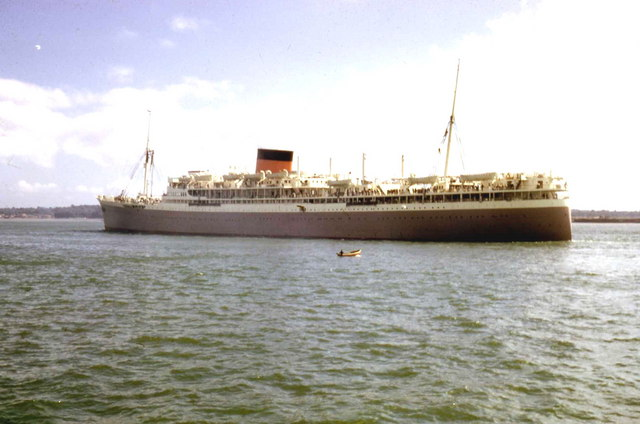
Leaving Southampton in 1962

A third, slightly larger, ship of the class, the Capetown Castle, joined them in 1938.

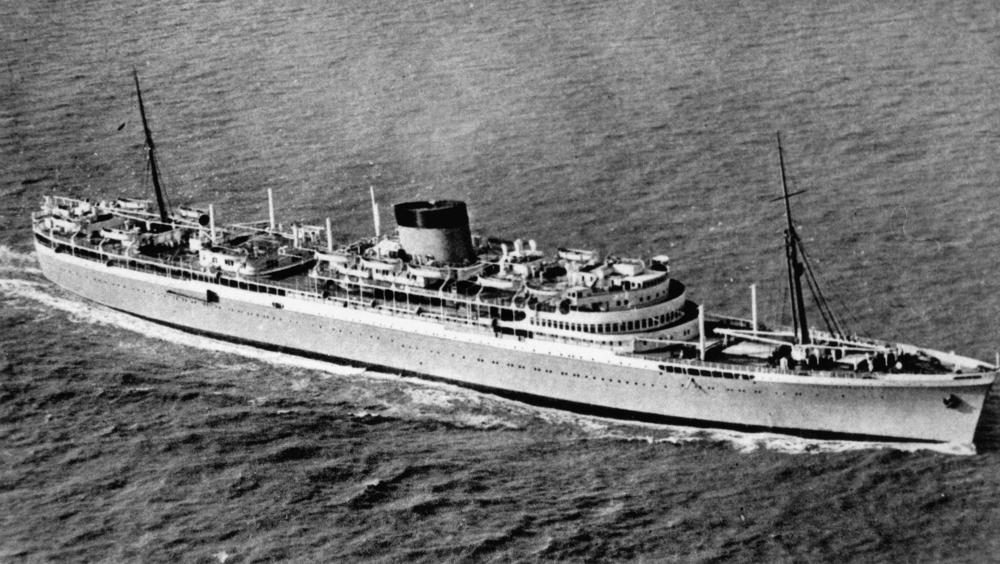
MV Stirling Castle at sea

== Propulsion ==
Harland and Wolff built her two Burmeister & Wain engines under license. They were the largest marine oil engines constructed in Britain until then. Each engine was a double-acting 10-cylinder marine two-stroke diesels developing 24,000 hp with bore x stroke 26 inches (66 cm) x 59 inches (150 cm). Each engine was 34 feet (10 m) high from the centre of the crankshaft, 72 feet (22 m) long and weighed 900 long tons (1,000 short tons), and drove a single screw.

== Service ==
Stirling Castle left Southampton on her maiden voyage on 7 February 1936. In August of that year she set a new record for the route, reaching Table Bay in 13 days 9 hours, beating the previous record of 14 days, 18 hours, and 57 minutes SS Scot had set in 1893.

During World War II, Stirling Castle was used as a troopship. She came through the war unscathed after steaming some 505,000 miles and carrying 128,000 personnel.

She was released from government service in 1946. In 1946, she sailed from Southampton on 31 August for Australia arriving at Fremantle on 28 September. Her builders then refitted her and she resumed passenger service in 1947.

The mail service was accelerated in 1965 and Stirling Castle and her sisters had insufficient speed to maintain the new schedule. They were replaced by two new fast cargo ships (the new schedule required only seven ships rather than eight) and Stirling Castle was withdrawn from service upon arrival at Southampton on 30 November 1965.

== Fate ==
A proposed sale to Taiwan breakers (where her sister had gone nineteen months earlier) fell through and she was instead sold for scrapping in Japan. She left Southampton on 1 February 1966 for Mihara. She arrived there on 3 March 1966 to be broken up by Nichimen Co.

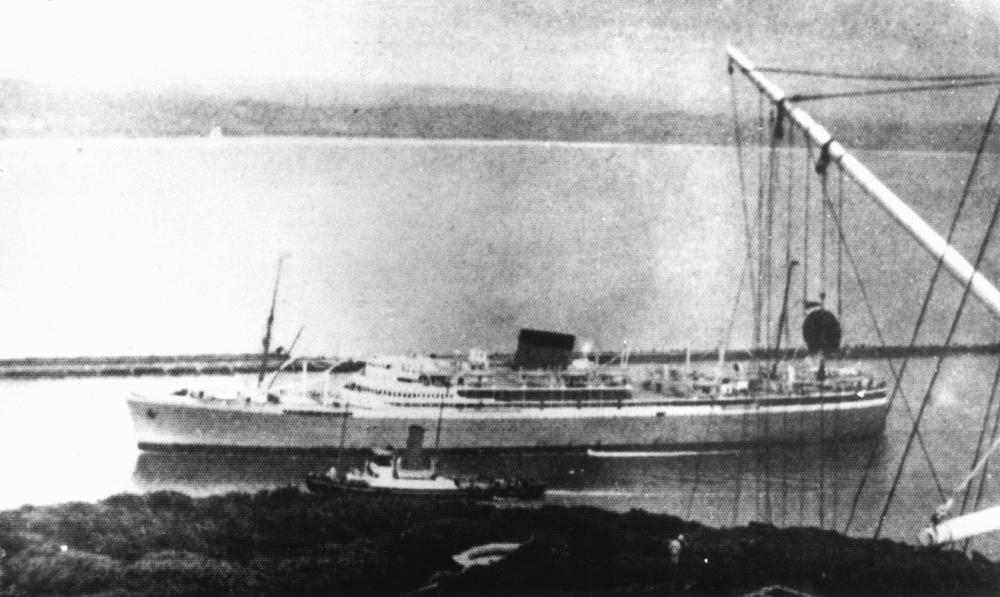
At Dock
