= HMS Cheshire =

UK passenger liner, armed merchant cruiser, and troopship

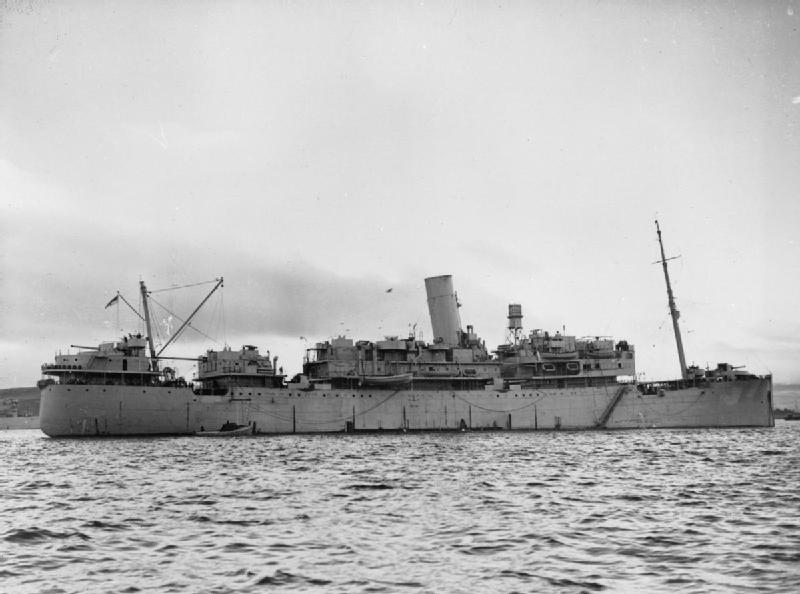
- HMS Cheshire in war service

History

United Kingdom
- Name: Cheshire
- Namesake: Cheshire
- Owner: Bibby Line
- Operator: 1939: (United Kingdom) Admiralty
- Port of registry: 1927: (United Kingdom) Liverpool
- Route: Great Britain – Rangoon
- Builder: Fairfield S&E, Govan
- Yard number: 620
- Launched: 20 April 1927
- Completed: July 1927
- Identification: UK official number 149625; until 1933: code letters KWFV; by 1930: call sign GLXV; 1939: pennant number F18
- Fate: scrapped in Newport, 1957

General characteristics
- Type: 1927: passenger ship; 1939: armed merchant cruiser; 1943: troopship
- Tonnage: 10,560 GRT, 6,624 NRT
- Length: 483.6 ft (147.4 m)
- Beam: 60.3 ft (18.4 m)
- Draught: 29 ft 1 1/4 in (8.87 m)
- Depth: 31.8 ft (9.7 m)
- Decks: 3
- Installed power: 2 × two-stroke diesel engines; 2,196 NHP
- Propulsion: 2 × screws
- Speed: 15 1/2 knots (29 km/h)
- Sensors & processing systems: as built: submarine signalling, wireless direction finding; by 1946: radar; by 1955: gyrocompass
- Armament: 6 × 6-inch (150 mm) guns; 2 × 3-inch (76 mm) guns
- Notes: sister ships: Shropshire, Staffordshire, Worcestershire, Derbyshire

HMS Cheshire was a passenger ship that was built in Scotland in 1927 and scrapped in Wales in 1957. She belonged to Bibby Line, which ran passenger and cargo services between Rangoon in Burma (now Yangon in Myanmar) and various ports in Great Britain, via the Suez Canal and Gibraltar. The Admiralty requisitioned her in 1939 and had her converted into an armed merchant cruiser (AMC). She was converted into a troopship in 1943, and returned to civilian service in 1948.

She was the second of five Bibby Line ships to be named after the English county of Cheshire. The first was a steamship that was built in 1891 and sold in 1911. The third was a motor ship that was built in 1959 and sold in 1968. The fourth was built in 1971 and sold in 1983. The fifth was built in 1989.

The second Cheshire was the second of five sister ships that the Fairfield Shipbuilding and Engineering Company of Govan in Glasgow built for Bibby Line. The first was Shropshire, which was built in 1926. They were followed by Staffordshire in 1929, Worcestershire in 1931, and Derbyshire in 1935.

== Building ==
Fairfield built Cheshire as yard number 620, launched her on 20 April 1927, and completed her that July. Her registered length was 483.6 ft (147.4 m), her beam was 60.3 ft (18.4 m), her depth was 31.8 ft (9.7 m) and her draught was 29 ft 1 1/4 in (8.87 m). Her tonnages were 10,560 GRT and 6,624 NRT. She was completed with four masts, like all Bibby ships of her era.

Cheshire had twin screws, each driven by an eight-cylinder two-stroke diesel engine. The combined power of her twin engines was rated at 2,196 NHP, and gave her a speed of 15 1/2 knots (28.7 km/h).

As built, her navigation equipment included submarine signalling and wireless direction finding.

Bibby Line registered Cheshire at Liverpool. Her United Kingdom official number was 149601 and her code letters were 149625. By 1930 her call sign was GLXV. In 1934 this superseded her code letters.

== Auxiliary cruiser ==
On 29 August 1939 the Admiralty requisitioned Cheshire for conversion into an AMC. Her primary armament was six 6-inch (150 mm) guns, and her secondary armament was two 3-inch (76 mm) guns. She was commissioned on 30 October, with the pennant number F18. Her first commander was Captain Montague Bernard. Her mainmast and mizzen-mast were removed, as was the top of her jigger-mast. Only her foremast survived the conversion intact.

Cheshire was assigned to the South Atlantic Station from November 1939 until April 1940, the North Atlantic Escort Force in May 1940, the Northern and Western Patrol from June 1940 until April 1941, and the Freetown Escort Force from May to November 1941. She returned to the South Atlantic Station from December 1941 to April 1943, and was assigned to the Nore Command from May to June 1943.

From January to March 1940 Cheshire took part in the escort of three SL convoys from Freetown in Sierra Leone to Britain. On 28 May 1940, she protected the French aviso Enseigne Henry, which was rescuing survivors from the torpedoed cargo liner Brazza. In June 1941, she took part in the escort of Convoy HX 131 from Halifax, Nova Scotia to Britain, and Convoy OB 335 from Liverpool out into the North Atlantic. In July 1941 she took part in the escort of Convoy BHX 137 from Bermuda to join Convoy HX 137 in mid-Atlantic to continue to Britain. In August 1942 Cheshire took part in the escort of Convoy SL 118 from Freetown to Britain.

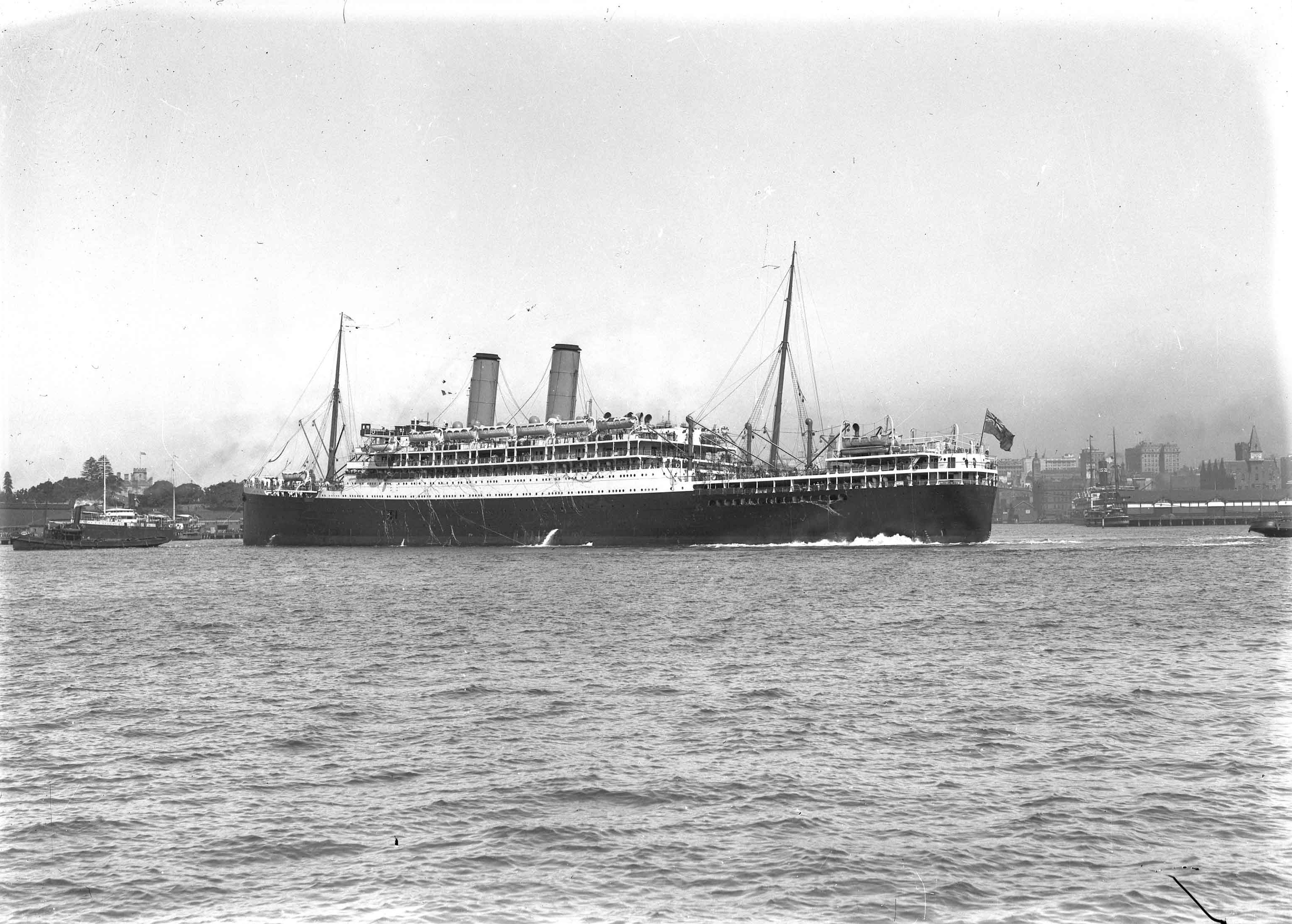
The troopship Oronsay, which was damaged by an air attack and assisted by ships including Cheshire

On 8 October 1940 Cheshire and her sister ship Salopian were on patrol when enemy aircraft attacked Convoy WS 3 (Fast), which was assembling in home waters to take seven troopships from Britain to Suez. Enemy aircraft attacked the troopships Capetown Castle and Oronsay. Cheshire and Salopian came to assist. Salopian resumed her patrol, but Cheshire stayed with the destroyers HMS Active and HMCS Ottawa to assist Oronsay, which had been damaged.

At 21:28 hours 14 October 1940 U-137 attacked Cheshire northwest of Ireland at position 55°13′N 13°02′W, hitting her with one torpedo. The destroyer HMCS Skeena and corvette HMS Periwinkle took off 220 members of her crew. Cheshire was towed to Belfast Lough, where she was beached. She was later towed to Liverpool for repairs, which took six months. She returned to active service in 1941, commanded by Captain James Begg.

On 7 August 1942 Cheshire joined the escort of SL118, a convoy of 37 merchant ships that had left Freetown on 4 August and was bound for Liverpool. At 18:52 hours on 18 August U-214 attacked the convoy at position 41°30′N 19°49′W, firing four single torpedoes. Two hit and sank Netherland Line's Balingkar, one damaged the British India Steam Navigation Company's Hatarana, and one damaged Cheshire.

== Troopship ==
On 9 June 1943 the Admiralty returned Cheshire to Bibby Line, for conversion into a troopship for the Ministry of War Transport (MoWT).

In the small hours of 24 December 1944 Cheshire and the Belgian troopship Léopoldville, escorted by four destroyers, left Southampton to cross the English Channel to Cherbourg. They carried the 262nd and 264th regiments, which were part of the United States Army's 66th Infantry Division. That afternoon, just 5 1/2 nautical miles (10 km) off Cherbourg, U-486 sank Léopoldville with two torpedoes, killing 763 US soldiers and 56 crew.

Between 28 and 31 December 1944 Cheshire took the US Army's 289th Engineer Combat Battalion from Southampton to Le Havre. Other US Army units that Cheshire carried during the war included the 263rd Regiment, which was part of the 66th Infantry Division, and the 329th Regiment, which was part of the 83rd Infantry Division.

The MoWT later used Cheshire as a repatriation ship.

== Final years ==
On 5 October 1948 the MoWT returned Cheshire to Bibby Line, which resumed its passenger service between Britain and Rangoon.

By 1946 Cheshire's navigation equipment included radar. By 1955 it also included a gyrocompass.

Toward the end of her career she attended at least one of the UK's nuclear bomb tests on Christmas Island. On 11 July 1957 she arrived in Newport, Wales, where John Cashmore Ltd scrapped her.

== Bibliography ==
- Harnack, Edwin P (1949) [1903]. All About Ships & Shipping (8th ed.). London: Faber and Faber.
- Lloyd's Register of Shipping. Vol. II.–Steamers and Motorships. London: Lloyd's Register of Shipping. 1928 – via Internet Archive.
- Lloyd's Register of Shipping (PDF). Vol. II.–Steamers and Motorships of 300 tons gross and over. London: Lloyd's Register of Shipping. 1934 – via Southampton City Council.
- Lloyd's Register of Shipping. Vol. Steamers and Motorships of 300 tons gross and over, Steamers and motorships inder 300 tons, Trawlers, tugs, dredgers, &c., Sailing vessels, List of ship owners, &c. London: Lloyd's Register of Shipping. 1946 – via Internet Archive.
- Mercantile Navy List. London. 1928 – via Crew List Index Project.
- Mercantile Navy List. London. 1930 – via Crew List Index Project.
- Osborne, Richard; Spong, Harry; Grover, Tom (2007). Armed Merchant Cruisers 1878–1945. Windsor, UK: World Ship Society. ISBN 978-0-9543310-8-5.
- Register Book. Vol. I Register of Ships. London: Lloyd's Register of Shipping. 1955 – via Internet Archive.
- Talbot-Booth, EC (1936). Ships and the Sea (Third ed.). London: Sampson Low, Marston & Co Ltd.
