= Peter-Erich Cremer =

German WW2 U-Boat commander

- Born: 25 March 1911; Metz, Alsace-Lorraine
- Died: 5 July 1992 (aged 81); Hamburg, Germany
- Military career
- Allegiance: Nazi Germany
- Branch: Kriegsmarine
- Service years: 1932–45
- Rank: Korvettenkapitän
- Nickname: Ali
- Units: cruiser Köln; Panzerschiff Deutschland destroyer Theodor Riedel
- Commands: U-152; U-333; U-2519
- Conflicts: World War II
- Awards: Knight's Cross of the Iron Cross

Peter-Erich Cremer (25 March 1911 – 5 July 1992) was a German U-boat commander during the Second World War. He was a recipient of the Knight's Cross of the Iron Cross of Nazi Germany.

== Biography ==
Peter-Erich Cremer was born in Metz, Alsace-Lorraine, on 25 March 1911. After high school, Cremer enlisted in the Reichsmarine in 1932. After serving on cruisers and destroyers, Cremer became captain in February 1940. He received the Iron Cross 2nd class. He was promoted to the rank of submarine commander in August 1940, and was given U-152. He commanded the U-333 from 25 August 1941 to 6 October 1942 and again from 18 May 1943, to 19 July 1944. On 31 January 1942 he mistakenly attacked and sunk Spreewald; he was court-martialed and found not guilty.

After several victorious trips, he received the Knight's Cross of the Iron Cross (Ritterkreuz des Eisernen Kreuzes) on 5 June 1942, and in that same year was severely wounded. He sailed again from 1943 until July 1944, before giving his boat to his lieutenant. In November 1944, Cremer, now Lieutenant Commander, aimed to convey the new submarine U-2519 Class XXI. Citing "several design flaws", Cremer scuttled the submarine at Kiel, in May 1945.

As the war drew to a close, he was attached to the personal security unit of Karl Dönitz. In this role he was involved in the incident in which Kapitän zur See Wolfgang Lüth was shot to death by a German sentry.

Peter-Erich Cremer appeared in Episode 10: 'Wolf Pack: U-Boats in the Atlantic' of the British television documentary The World at War in the early 1970s. Later he recounted his life in his books U-333: The story of a U-boat ace and U-Boat Commander: a periscope view of the Battle of the Atlantic. He died in Hamburg on 5 July 1992.

== Summary of career ==
=== Ships sunk and damaged ===
As commander of U-333 Cremer sank six merchant ships totalling 26,873 GRT, damaged another 8,327 GRT, and also engaged and damaged the 925 long tons (940 t) Flower-class corvette HMS Crocus.

Date	Ship	Nationality	Tons	Convoy	Fate and location
22 January 1942	Vassilios A. Polemis	Greece	3,429	ON-53	Sunk at 42°32′N 52°38′W
24 January 1942	Ringstad	Norway	4,765	ON-55	Sunk at 45°50′N 51°04′W
31 January 1942	Spreewald	Nazi Germany	5,083		Sunk at 45°12′N 24°50′W
6 May 1942	Amazone	Netherlands	1,294		Sunk at 27°21′N 80°04′W
6 May 1942	Halsey	United States	7,088		Sunk at 27°14′N 80°03′W
6 May 1942	Java Arrow	United States	8,327		Damaged at 27°35′N 80°08′W
10 May 1942	Clan Skene	United Kingdom	5,214		Sunk at 31°43′N 70°43′W
6 October 1942	HMS Crocus	Royal Navy	925		Damaged at 07°52′N 14°57′W

=== Awards ===
- Iron Cross (1939) 2nd Class (11 February 1940) & 1st Class (10 February 1942)
- Destroyer War Badge ( 19 October 1940 )
- U-boat War Badge (1939) ( 26 May 1942 )
- Knight's Cross of the Iron Cross on 5 June 1942 as Kapitänleutnant and commander of U-333
- Wound Badge in Silver ( 11 November 1942 )
- U-boat Front Clasp ( 27 September 1944 )

=== Promotions ===
15 August 1932:	Offiziersanwärter (Officer Candidate)
1 January 1934:	Fähnrich zur See (Officer Cadet)
1 September 1935:	Oberfähnrich zur See (Senior Ensign)
1 January 1936:	Leutnant zur See (Second Lieutenant)
1 October 1937:	Oberleutnant zur See (First Lieutenant)
2 February 1940:	Kapitänleutnant (Captain Lieutenant)
11 July 1944:	Korvettenkapitän (Corvette Captain)
