= MV Spreewald =

German cargo ship sunk by a U-boat during World War II

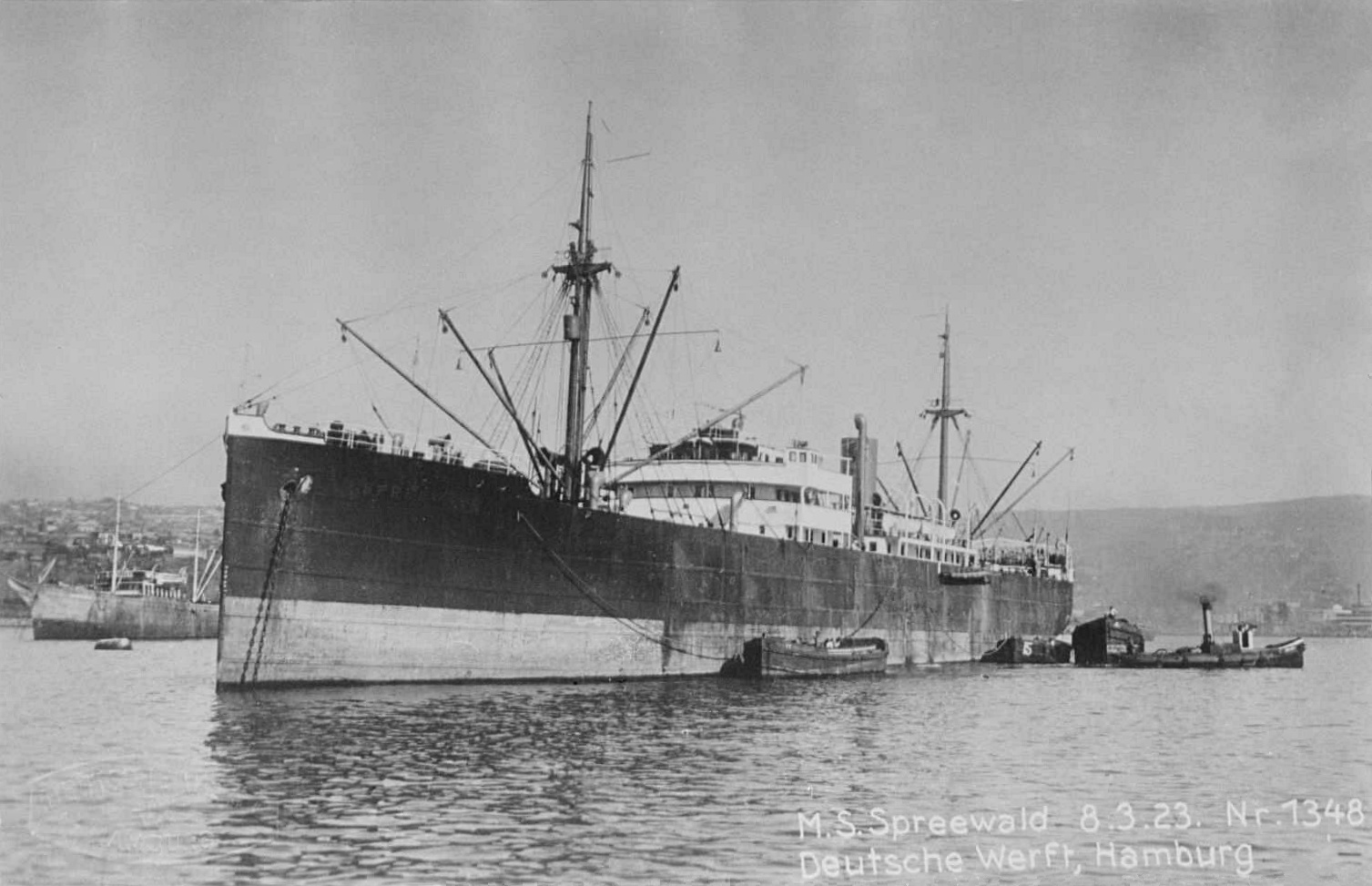
- Spreewald in 1923

History

Germany
- Name: 1922: Spreewald; 1935: Anubis; 1939: Spreewald
- Namesake: 1922: Spreewald; 1925: Anubis
- Owner: Hamburg America Line
- Port of registry: Hamburg
- Builder: Deutsche Werft, Hamburg
- Launched: 12 October 1922
- Completed: 1922
- Identification: 1922: code letters RDFL; 1934: call sign DIFF
- Fate: sunk 31 January 1942

General characteristics
- Type: cargo ship
- Tonnage: 5,083 GRT, 3,002 NRT
- Length: 399.6 ft (121.8 m)
- Beam: 54.2 ft (16.5 m)
- Depth: 27.4 ft (8.4 m)
- Decks: 2
- Installed power: 714 NHP
- Propulsion: 1 × 4-stroke diesel engine; 1 × screw
- Speed: 11 knots (20 km/h)
- Sensors & processing systems: submarine signalling; by 1931: wireless direction finding
- Notes: sister ship: Odenwald

MV Spreewald was a Hamburg America Line (HAPAG) cargo motor ship that was launched in 1922 and sunk in a friendly fire incident in 1942. She was renamed Anubis in 1935, and reverted to her original name Spreewald in 1939.

This was the second of three HAPAG ships named after the Spreewald district of Lusatia. The first was a steamship that was launched in 1907, captured in 1914, and was converted into the submarine depôt ship HMS Lucia. The third was a motor ship that was completed in 1951 and scrapped in 1979.

== A class of –wald ships ==
Between 1921 and 1923 Deutsche Werft in Hamburg built a class of ten single-screw cargo ships for HAPAG. The first two, Niederwald and Steigerwald, were completed in 1921. Each was a refrigerated cargo steamship, with a triple-expansion steam engine plus an exhaust steam turbine.

The eight ships that followed were general cargo ships, with no cargo refrigeration, and with three different propulsion systems. Westerwald, Frankenwald, Wasgenwald, Idarwald, and Kellerwald had only a triple-expansion engine, with no exhaust steam turbine. Schwarzwald had two steam turbines driving its single shaft via double-reduction gearing. The final two, Spreewald and Odenwald, were motor ships, completed in 1923.

HAPAG had previously had a series of cargo liners with names ending in "–wald". All had joined its fleet between 1907 and 1912, but the Entente Powers had captured, sunk, or confiscated them between 1914 and 1919. Most of the new class of ships built in 1921–23 re-used the names of ships from that previous series.

== Spreewald ==
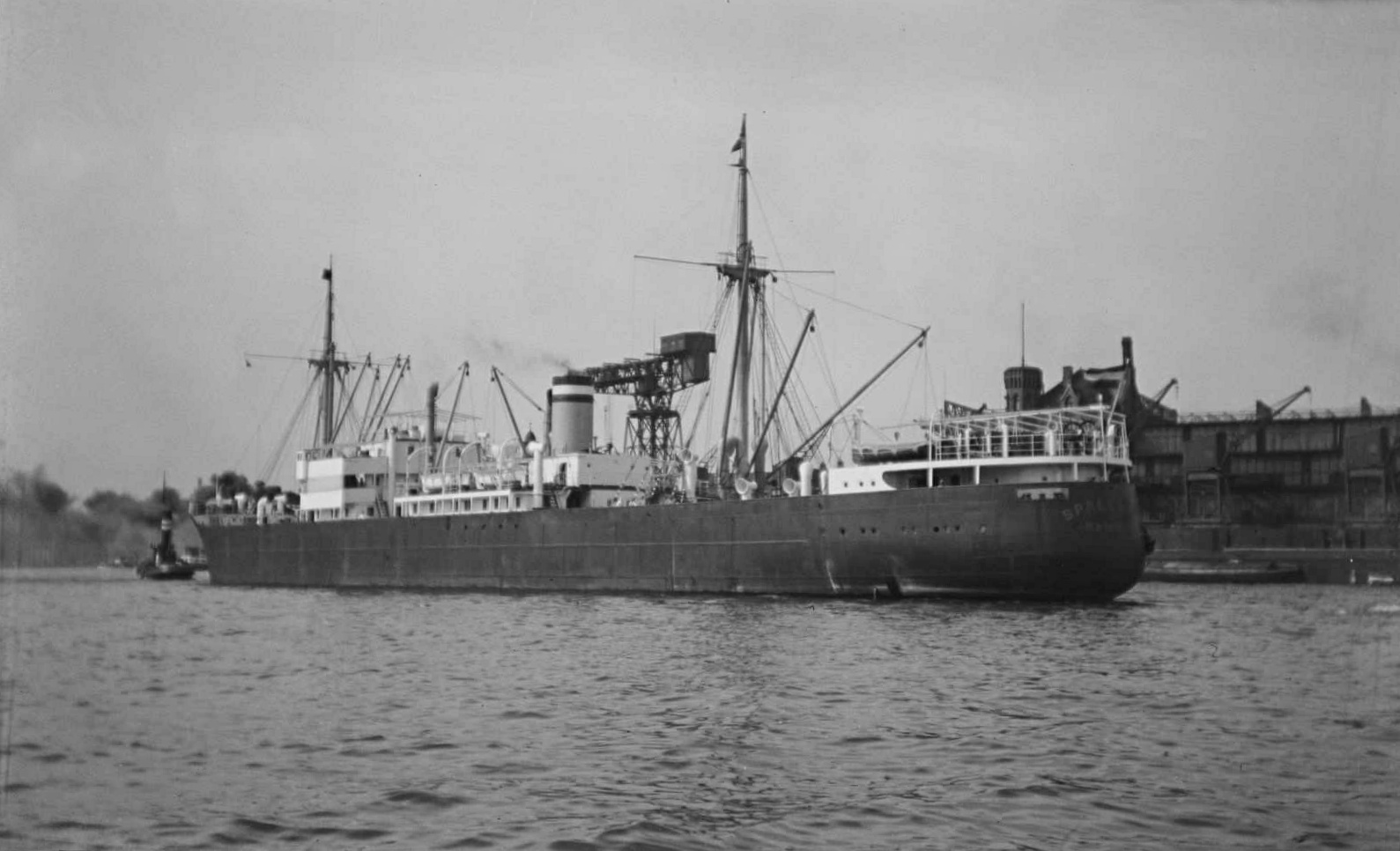
Spreewald seen from her port quarter, showing her cruiser-style stern

Deutsche Werft launched Spreewald on 12 October 1922 and completed her before the end of the year. Her registered length was 399.6 ft (121.8 m), her beam was 54.2 ft (16.5 m), and her depth was 27.4 ft (8.4 m). Her tonnages were 5,083 GRT and 3,002 NRT. Her single screw was driven by an AEG 12-cylinder four-stroke diesel engine. It was rated at 714 NHP, and gave her a speed of 11 knots (20 km/h).

HAPAG registered Spreewald at Hamburg. Her code letters were RDFL. Her navigation equipment included submarine signalling, and by 1931 it also included wireless direction finding. In 1934 the wireless telegraph call sign DIFF superseded her code letters.

On 28 April 1924 Spreewald ran aground at Emden. She was refloated the next day.

In 1935 HAPAG renamed Spreewald and Odenwald as Anubis and Assuan respectively. In 1939 it changed both ships back to their original names.

Spreewald was in the Far East when France and the United Kingdom declared war on Germany in September 1939. She took refuge in Port Arthur in Dairen, Manchukuo (now Lüshun Port in Dalian, China). Manchukuo was a puppet state of the Empire of Japan.

== Loss ==
On 21 October 1941 Spreewald left Dairen to try to reach German-occupied Europe. She carried a cargo strategic to the German war effort: 3,365 tons of rubber, 320 tons of tin, 20 tons of tungsten, and a quantity of quinine. En route she met the German supply ship Kulmerland in the Society Islands. Kulmerland transferred to Spreewald 86 UK prisoners of war, who had survived the German auxiliary cruiser Kormoran sinking their ships.

Spreewald disguised herself as two Allied cargo ships: the Norwegian Elg and British Brittany. She successfully ran the blockade around occupied Europe. On 29 January 1942 U-575 was due to rendezvous with her and escort her through the Bay of Biscay to Bordeaux in German-occupied France. U-123 also arranged to be at the rendezvous, in order for Spreewald's ship's doctor to treat an injured man aboard the U-boat.

Spreewald reached the rendezvous ahead of schedule. U-123 met her as arranged, but U-575 was not there yet. Spreewald continued unescorted, still disguised as Elg. At 16:50 hrs on 31 January she was steering a zigzag course in the North Atlantic north of the Azores when U-333 hit her with one torpedo. Spreewald's wireless telegraph operator broadcast a distress signal under her other pseudonym, Brittany. U-333 received the distress signal, from which the U-boat commander, Peter-Erich Cremer, concluded he had hit an Allied cargo ship. At 18:33 hrs U-333 hit Spreewald with a second torpedo, which sank her at position 45°12′N 24°50′W.

== Rescue ==
Only then did Cremer realise his mistake, and U-333 began to rescue survivors. U-701 and U-582 joined the search, but were low on fuel as they were returning from their patrols. U-332 and U-105, which were just starting their patrols, joined the search, and so did five Focke-Wulf Fw 200 Condor long-range patrol aircraft from Luftwaffe bases in France. U-105 rescued 25 crew members and 55 PoWs in lifeboats and rafts. Another lifeboat, containing Spreewald's Master, 10 crew members, and 13 PoWs was unaccounted for. U-105 searched for another three days before giving up and heading back to her base at Lorient. Of the 152 aboard Spreewald, 72 were killed.

U-105 reported that she was carrying severely injured German sailor. A Dornier Do 24 flying boat was sent to pick up him up, but crashed in rough sea. U-105 rescued all seven of the aircrew, and sank the wreck of the aircraft by gunfire.

On 9 February U-333 got back to her base at La Pallice. Cremer was immediately court-martialled, but his defence was accepted, and he was found not guilty.

== Bibliography ==
- Haws, Duncan (1980). The Ships of the Hamburg America, Adler and Carr Lines. Merchant Fleets in Profile. Vol. 4. Cambridge: Patrick Stephens Ltd. ISBN 0-85059-397-2.
- Lloyd's Register of Shipping. Vol. II.–Steamers and Motor Vessels. London: Lloyd's Register of Shipping. 1922 – via Internet Archive.
- Lloyd's Register of Shipping. Vol. II.–Steamers and Motorships. London: Lloyd's Register of Shipping. 1924 – via Internet Archive.
- Lloyd's Register of Shipping (PDF). Vol. II.–Steamers and Motorships of 300 tons gross and over. London: Lloyd's Register of Shipping. 1931 – via Southampton City Council.
- Lloyd's Register of Shipping (PDF). Vol. II.–Steamers and Motorships of 300 tons gross and over. London: Lloyd's Register of Shipping. 1934 – via Southampton City Council.
- Lloyd's Register of Shipping (PDF). Vol. II.–Steamers and Motorships over 300 tons. London: Lloyd's Register of Shipping. 1935 – via Southampton City Council.
- Lloyd's Register of Shipping (PDF). Vol. II.–Steamers and Motorships of 300 tons. Trawlers, tugs, dredgers, etc. Sailing vessels. Shipowners, etc. London: Lloyd's Register of Shipping. 1939 – via Southampton City Council.
