= RMMV Capetown Castle =

British passenger liner

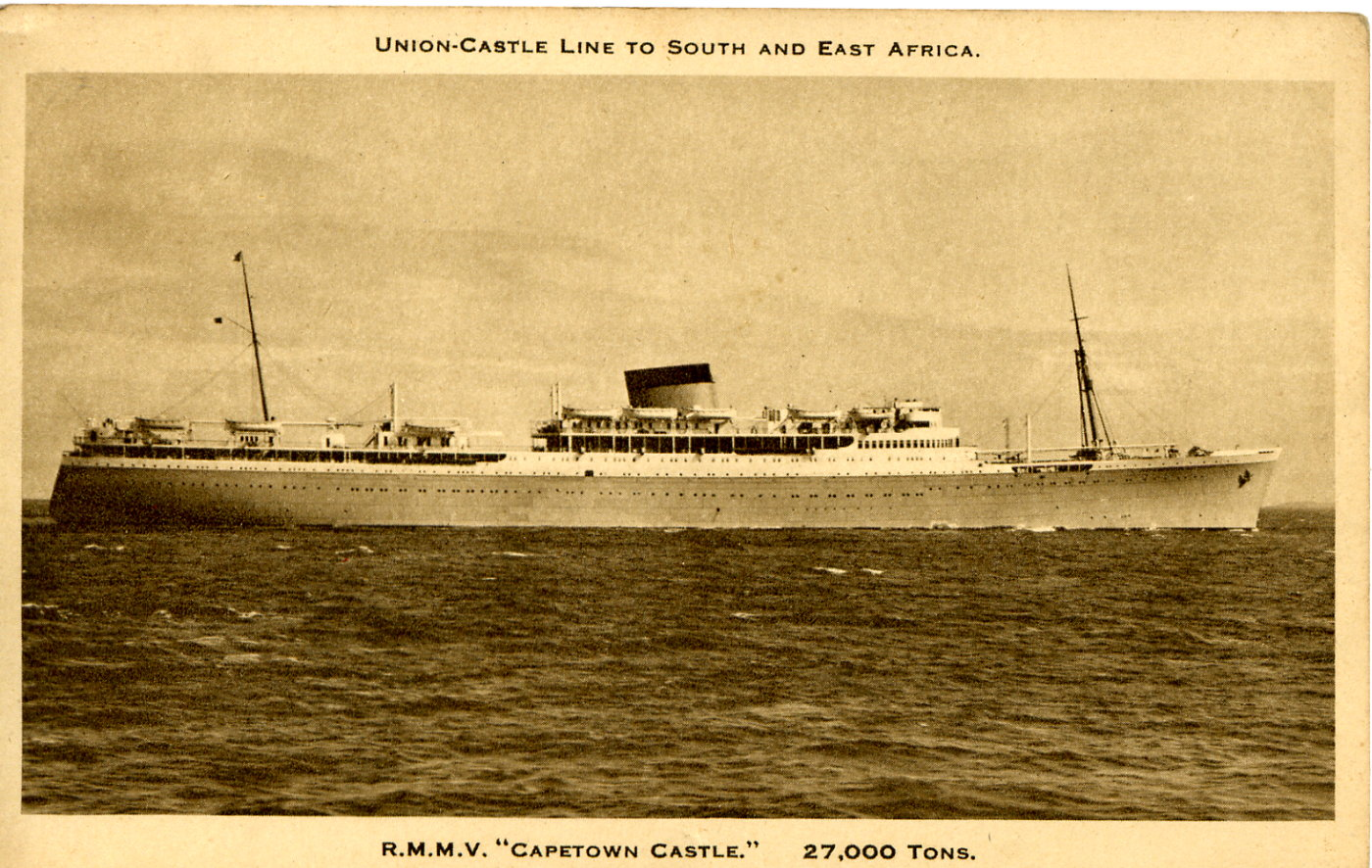
- Postcard of RMMV Capetown Castle

History

United Kingdom
- Name: RMMV Capetown Castle
- Owner: Union-Castle Mail Steam Ship Company
- Port of registry: London, UK
- Route: Southampton-Las Palmas-Cape Town-Port Elizabeth-East London-Durban
- Builder: Harland & Wolff, Belfast
- Yard number: 986
- Launched: 23 September 1937
- Completed: 31 March 1938
- Maiden voyage: 29 April 1938
- Out of service: 9 September 1967
- Identification: IMO number: 5062285
- Fate: Scrapped, 1967

General characteristics
- Type: Passenger liner
- Tonnage: 27,002 GRT
- Length: 734 ft (224 m)
- Beam: 82 ft 6 in (25.15 m)
- Draught: 32 ft (9.8 m)
- Installed power: 28,000bhp
- Propulsion: 2 × 10-cylinder Harland and Wolff double acting two stroke cycle diesel engines; twin screw
- Speed: 20 knots (37 km/h; 23 mph)
- Capacity: As built, 292 1st class, 499 cabin class.; 1946, 243 1st class, 553 tourist class

RMMV Capetown Castle was a British passenger liner built by Harland & Wolff at Belfast for the Union-Castle Line's mail service from Southampton to South Africa. She was launched in September 1937 and sailed on her maiden voyage on 29 April 1938.

== History ==
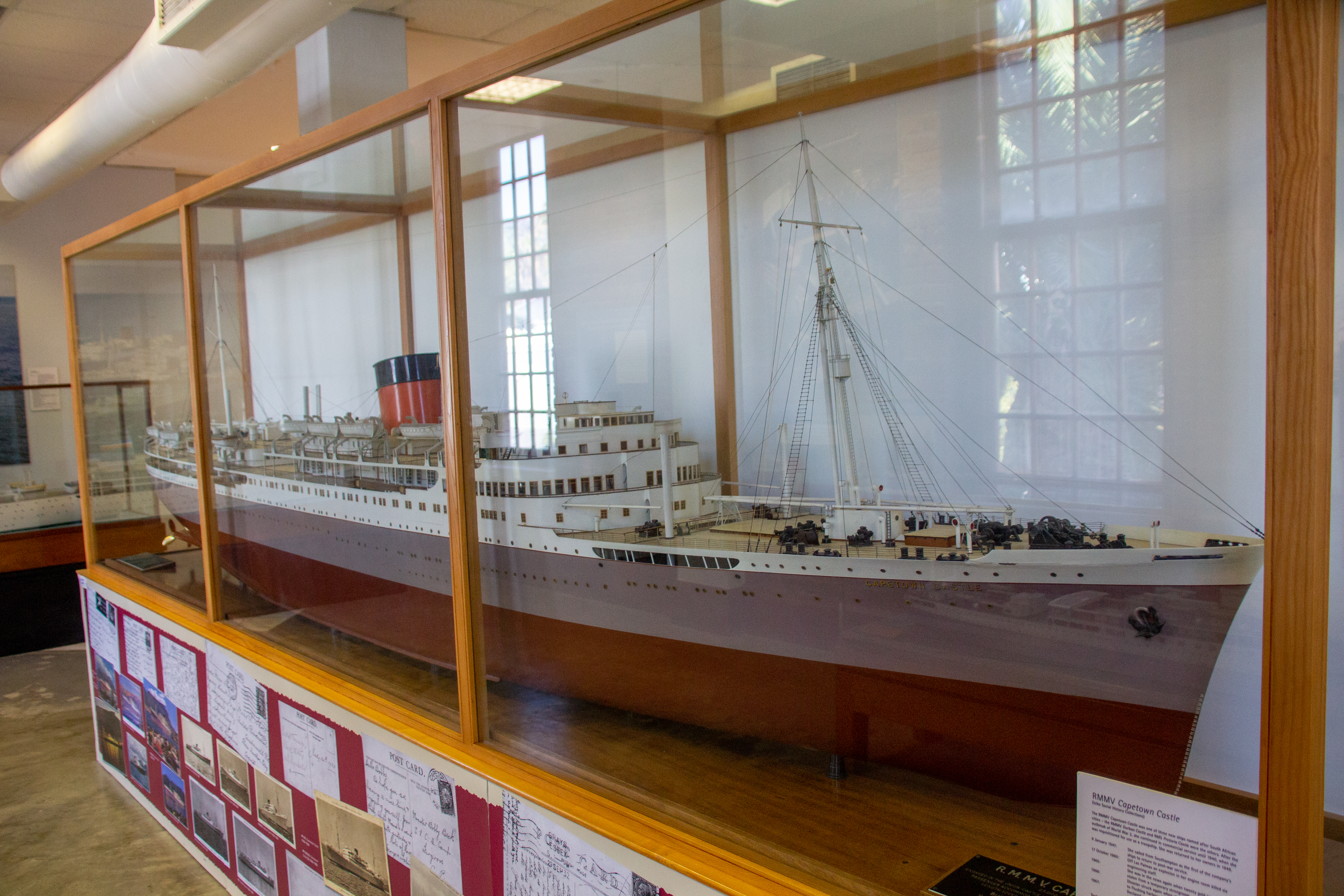
Model of the ship at the South African Maritime Museum

The ship was built by the builders Harland & Wolff and was launched on 23 September 1937 and was a slightly enlarged version of the Stirling Castle and Athlone Castle of 1936. After the outbreak of World War II, in January 1940, the government introduced the Liner Requisition Scheme and Capetown Castle was taken up for conversion into a troop ship. In 1943 she took part in Operation Bolero, the build-up of troops in preparation for D-Day, and was eventually returned to her owners in 1946, having sailed 484,000 miles and carried over 164,000 troops. The ship was refurbished at Belfast and returned to commercial service on 9 January 1947.

On 17 October 1960 the ship was arriving at Las Palmas when an explosion occurred in the engine room killing seven crewmen. In July 1965 a long-planned acceleration of the Cape mail service was introduced, reducing the passage time by two days. The new schedule required only seven ships rather than eight and Capetown Castle, like her near sisters Athlone Castle and Stirling Castle did not have enough speed to maintain it. The three were replaced by two fast cargo liners (Southampton Castle and Good Hope Castle) and the earlier two ships were sold for breaking up. The Good Hope Castle was late being delivered and Capetown Castle was kept on in the mail service until the new ship arrived in January 1966. She was then put on an "extra" service from Southampton to Cape Town via Flushing (Vlissingen), Madeira, Ascension, St. Helena and Walvis Bay. This continued for almost two years until she made her final arrival at Southampton on 9 September 1967 where she was withdrawn from service. She was sold for scrap and left Southampton on 19 September for La Spezia, arriving on 26 September for breaking up by Terrestre Marittima.
