= Advance =

Advance commonly refers to:

- Advance, an offensive push in sports, games, thoughts, military combat, or sexual or romantic pursuits
- Advance payment for goods or services
- Advance against royalties, a payment to be offset against future royalty payments

Advance may also refer to:

== Media ==
- Advance (newspaper), a Sudanese newspaper
- Advance Publications, an American media company headquartered in New York City
  - Advance Digital, part of Advance Local, owned by Advance Publications
  - Advance Newspapers, former company based in Hudsonville, Michigan, later bought by Advance Publications, defunct 2019
- Barrie Advance, a weekly newspaper serving Barrie, Ontario

== Music ==
- Advance (album), a 1996 album by British techno act LFO
- Advance!, a jazz album by drummer Philly Joe Jones
- Advance/Mata Asa ga Kuru, song by Tokio

== Organizations ==
- Advance (lobby group), a conservative political lobby group in Australia (formerly Advance Australia)
- Advance (trade union), a trade union based in the United Kingdom
- Advance New Zealand Party, abbreviated as Advance NZ or Advance, a political party active from 2020 to 2021
- Advance New Zealand (1995), a former political party in New Zealand
- Advance Thun SA, a Swiss paraglider manufacturer based in Thun
- Advance Together, abbreviated as Advance, a short-lived British political party
- Advance UK, a far-right political party in the United Kingdom

== Places ==
=== Canada ===
- Advance, Ontario

=== United States ===
- Advance, California
- Advance, Indiana
- Flatwoods, Kentucky, originally known as Advance
- Advance, Michigan
- Advance, Missouri
- Advance, North Carolina
- Advance, Ohio
- Advance, Wisconsin
- Advance Township, North Dakota

== Ships ==
- Advance (or A. D. Vance), a Confederate blockade runner (1863-1864)
- Advance (1872), a wooden Top sail schooner
- Advance (1874), a Composite Schooner
- Advance (1884), an Iron Steamer screw Tug
- Advance (1903), a diesel powered wooden carvel schooner
- Advance (shipwrecked 1933), a screw steamer
- USS Advance, several ships of the US Navy

== Other uses ==
- Advance (English automobile), an English tricar
- Advance (Australian motorcycle), a built-to-order bike 1905–1906
- Advance (horse), a Thoroughbred horse
- Game Boy Advance, a 2001 Nintendo handheld
- Game Boy Advance SP, the 2003 successor
- Mario Party Advance, a 2005 video game
- Nilfisk-Advance, a brand of cleaning equipment

== See also ==
- Advancement (disambiguation)
- Ahead (disambiguation)
- Forward (disambiguation)
- Retreat (disambiguation)
