= Ahead =

Ahead may refer to:

- "Ahead/Replay", Japanese song by Vamps
- Ahead Software, former name of the software company Nero AG
- AHEAD ammunition, a type of airburst round ammunition

== See also ==
- Dead Ahead (disambiguation)
- Go Ahead (disambiguation)
- Lookahead (disambiguation)
- Looking Ahead (disambiguation)
- Straight Ahead (disambiguation)
- Advance (disambiguation)
- Forward (disambiguation)
- Front (disambiguation)
- Onward (disambiguation)
- Progress (disambiguation)
- Readahead, a system call of the Linux kernel
