= Advancer =

Advancer may refer to:

- a person or thing that advances
- the partner of an overcaller in contact bridge
- a forward-pointing branch of an antler
- a brand name for trailers produced by the Sunline Coach Company in the 2000s
- a piece in the Rococo variation of Baroque chess
- "The Advancer" ("La Avanzadora"), nickname of Juana Ramírez, a female participant in the 1813 Battle of Alto de los Godos

== See also ==
- Advancer Tina, a 1996 anime on the list of titles by Green Bunny
