= List of shipwrecks in February 1884 =

The list of shipwrecks in February 1884 includes ships sunk, foundered, grounded, or otherwise lost during February 1884.

== 1 February ==
List of shipwrecks: 1 February 1884
Ship	State	Description
Aurora	United Kingdom	The schooner was driven ashore at Lymington, Hampshire.
Ben Lomond	United Kingdom	The fishing smack collided with the steamship Forest Queen (United Kingdom) and sank at Hull, Yorkshire. Her crew were rescued by Forest Queen.
Burncoose	United Kingdom	The schooner was driven ashore and wrecked at Stornoway, Isle of Lewis, Outer Hebrides.
Crown of Denmark	United Kingdom	The ship was driven ashore at Greenock, Renfrewshire.
Edith	United Kingdom	The brigantine was driven ashore and wrecked at Kingstown, County Dublin. Her crew survived. She was on a voyage from Waterford to Ardrossan, Ayrshire.
Ilva	United Kingdom	The ship departed from Liverpool, Lancashire for Pernambuco, Brazil. No further trace, reported overdue.
Janetta	United Kingdom	The schooner was driven ashore and wrecked at Ballyferris Point, County Down. Her crew were rescued.
Nürnberg	Germany	The steamship ran aground in the Patapsco River. She was on a voyage from Baltimore, Maryland, United States to Bremen. She was refloated and resumed her voyage.
Onwardd	United Kingdom	The schooner foundered off Pladda, in the Firth of Clyde. Her crew were rescued.
Sea Foam	United Kingdom	The ship was driven ashore at the Mumbles, Glamorgan. She was on a voyage from Swansea, Glamorgan to Port Nolloth, Cape Colony.

== 2 February ==
List of shipwrecks: 2 February 1884
Ship	State	Description
Æolus	Norway	The barque was abandoned in the North Sea (55°16′N 7°58′E) with the loss of seven of her nine crew. Survivors were rescued by the fishing cutter Patriksfjord (Denmark). Æolus was on a voyage from Brunswick to Hamburg, Germany.
Black Swan	United Kingdom	The pilot boat was driven onto the Middlehead Rock, off the Mumbles, Glamorgan and was severely damaged.
Crown	United Kingdom	The brigantine was driven ashore at West Hartlepool, County Durham. Her six crew were rescued. She was on a voyage from Rye, Sussex to West Hartlepool.
Gordon	Canada	The barque ran aground on the Malms Rock, in The Downs. She was on a voyage from Dunkirk, Nord, France to New York, United States. She was refloated with assistance from the tug George Peabody (United Kingdom), which took her in tow.
Grique	United Kingdom	The barque was driven ashore at Holyhead, Anglesey. She was on a voyage from Liverpool, Lancashire to Pernambuco, Brazil.
Horatio	United Kingdom	The steamship was driven ashore at Holyhead. She was on a voyage from Barrow-in-Furness, Lancashire to Calais, France. She was refloated with assistance from the tug Enterprise (United Kingdom) and found to be severely leaky.
Macassar	Netherlands	The steamship was severely damaged by fire at Amsterdam, North Holland.
Notting Hill	United Kingdom	The steamship collided with and iceberg and foundered in the Atlantic Ocean. Her crew were rescued by the steamship State of Nebraska (United Kingdom). Notting Hill was on a voyage from London to New York.
Ruma	Austria-Hungary	The barque ran aground at Ensenada, Argentina and was wrecked. She was on a voyage from Newport, Monmouthshire, United Kingdom to Buenos Aires, Argentina.
Woodbine	United Kingdom	The schooner was driven ashore at Holyhead. She was on a voyage from Charlestown, Cornwall to Fleetwood, Lancashire.

== 3 February ==
List of shipwrecks: 3 February 1884
Ship	State	Description
Azalea	United Kingdom	The steamship ran aground in Rosses Bay. She was on a voyage from Londonderry to Glasgow, Renfrewshire.
Dewdrop	United Kingdom	The schooner foundered in the Atlantic Ocean. Her crew were rescued by the schooner Sirglinn (United Kingdom). Dewdrop was on a voyage from the Turks Islands to Jersey, Channel Islands.
Galtee	United Kingdom	The steamship collided with the quayside at Dunkirk, Nord, France and sank.
Statesman	United Kingdom	The brigantine was run into by Theodore H. Rand (United States) and sank in the English Channel off Beachy Head, Sussex with the loss of all but one of her crew. Statesman was on a voyage from South Shields, County Durham to Isigny-sur-Mer, Calvados, France.

== 4 February ==
List of shipwrecks: 4 February 1884
Ship	State	Description
Llanarthen	United Kingdom	The steamship sprang a leak and foundered at sea. Her crew were rescued by the steamship Ravenswood (United Kingdom). Llanarthen was on a voyage from Cardiff, Glamorgan to Colombo, Ceylon.

== 5 February ==
List of shipwrecks: 5 February 1884
Ship	State	Description
Rhuabon	United Kingdom	The steamship struck The Smalls and sank. Seven of her crew left in the ship's boat and were picked up by the steamer Briton (United Kingdom). Her captain and nine men were left on board. Rhuabon was on a voyage from Holyhead, Anglesey to Cardiff, Glamorgan.

== 6 February ==
List of shipwrecks: 6 February 1884
Ship	State	Description
Eva	United Kingdom	The lighter was run into by the steamship Countess of Dublin (United Kingdom) and sank in the River Thames. The lighterman was rescued by Countess of Dublin.
Pedro	Flag unknown	The derelict ship was taken in to Grimsby, Lincolnshire, United Kingdom by a number of fishing smacks.
Uhlenhorst	Germany	The steamship ran aground on the Ostertill.

== 7 February ==
List of shipwrecks: 7 February 1884
Ship	State	Description
Caroline	United Kingdom	The ship departed from Cardiff, Glamorgan for Marseille, Bouches-du-Rhône, France. No further trace, reported overdue.
Skulda	Flag unknown	The ship departed from Pensacola, Florida, United States for Dordrecht, South Holland, Netherlands. No further trace, reported overdue.

== 8 February ==
List of shipwrecks: 8 February 1884
Ship	State	Description
Brodrene	Denmark	The ship ran aground at Hjelmen, Norway and sprang a leak.

== 9 February ==
List of shipwrecks: 9 February 1884
Ship	State	Description
Egmont	United Kingdom	The brigantine ran aground on Howlins Bank and was abandoned. All on board were rescued by the Coastguard. She was on a voyage from Newport, Monmouthshire to Cork. She was refloated on 11 February and towed in to Wexford.
Tasmania	United Kingdom	The ship ran aground and was wrecked at Aberdeen. Her crew were rescued. She was being towed from Leith, Lothian to Aberdeen.

== 10 February ==
List of shipwrecks: 10 February 1884
Ship	State	Description
Alexandra	United Kingdom	The schooner foundered off Cardigan. Her four crew were rescued by the lifeboat Lizzie & Charles Leigh Clare ( Royal National Lifeboat Institution). Alexandra was on a voyage from Porthmadog, Caernarfonshire to Carmarthen.
Antonietta Costa	Italy	The barque struck Drayston Rock, off Plymouth, Devon, United Kingdom. She was on a voyage from Havre de Grâce, Seine-Inférieure, France to Cardiff, Glamorgan, United Kingdom. She was assisted in to Sutton Harbour, Devon by the tugs Secret and Vixen (both United Kingdom) in a severely leaky condition.
Cubano	Spain	The steamship was abandoned in the Atlantic Ocean. All on board were rescued. She was on a voyage from New Orleans, Louisiana, United States to Liverpool, Lancashire, United Kingdom.
Hugh Roberts	United Kingdom	The brig was driven ashore at Dungeness, Kent. She was on a voyage from London to Guadeloupe. She was refloated and taken in to The Downs.
Little Racer	United Kingdom	The schooner foundered 25 nautical miles (46 km) west north west of Lundy Island, Devon with the loss of three of her four crew. The survivor was rescued by Eurydice ( Canada).

== 11 February ==
List of shipwrecks: 11 February 1884
Ship	State	Description
Advance	New South Wales	The schooner ran aground in Botany Bay, New South Wales, and was wrecked.
Emily	United Kingdom	The steamship ran aground near Brigg's Reef, in the Belfast Lough and sank. She was on a voyage from Glasgow, Renfrewshire to Bordeaux, Gironde, France.
McClure	United Kingdom	The steamship struck the Barrel Rock and consequently foundered. Her thirteen crew were rescued by the steamship James Hogg (United Kingdom). McClure was on a voyage from Newport, Monmouthshire to Cork.
Samuel	Norway	The barque was driven ashore and wrecked east of Worms Head, Glamorgan, United Kingdom. Her eleven crew were rescued by rocket apparatus.
Sem	Kingdom of Dalmatia	The barque was driven ashore and wrecked at Carnsore, County Wexford, United Kingdom with the loss of all hands, at least seven lives. She was on a voyage from Swansea, Glamorgan to São Vicente, Cape Verde Islands.

== 12 February ==
List of shipwrecks: 12 February 1884
Ship	State	Description
Moel Rhewan	United Kingdom	The cargo of the barque shifted during a gale on 9 February causing her to list and she was taken in tow by Upupa (Flag unknown) near the Smalls Lighthouse. Two days later the line broke and Captain Williams refused to leave his ship. Upupa continued on her voyage and on 12 February the crew were taken off by three ships.
Samuel	Norway	The barque was driven ashore and wrecked east of Worms Head, Glamorgan, United Kingdom. Her crew were rescued. She was on a voyage from Cardiff, Glamorgan, to Santos, Brazil.

== 13 February ==
List of shipwrecks: 13 February 1884
Ship	State	Description
Earl Beaconsfield	United Kingdom	The ship capsized off Duncannon, County Wexford. All 33 people on board were rescued by the Duncannon Lifeboat. She was on a voyage from Glasgow, Renfrewshire to San Francisco, California, United States.
Fiducia	Germany	The steamship was driven ashore at "Bolsaxen", Denmark.
Stowell Brown	Canada	The ship was driven ashore at Passage East, County Waterford, United Kingdom.

== 15 February ==
List of shipwrecks: 15 February 1884
Ship	State	Description
Glengarry	United Kingdom	The steamship foundered in the North Sea off Scarborough, Yorkshire with the loss of two of her crew. She was on a voyage from Grangemouth, Stirlingshire to Rotterdam, South Holland, Netherlands.
Jane	United Kingdom	The schooner was driven ashore at Lamlash, Isle of Arran. She was refloated on 16 March and taken in to Irvine, Ayrshire for repairs.
Moratin	Spain	The steamship was driven ashore at Margate, Kent, United Kingdom. She was refloated with assistance from the Margate Lifeboat Friend to all Nations ( Royal National Lifeboat Institution).
Soldier Prince	United Kingdom	The steamship caught fire at Cartagena, Spain and was scuttled. She was on a voyage from Catania, Sicily, Italy to North Shields, Northumberland.

== 16 February ==
List of shipwrecks: 16 February 1884
Ship	State	Description
Veho	United Kingdom	The schooner was abandoned off St. Ann's Head, Pembrokeshire. She was on a voyage from Tynemouth, Northumberland to Runcorn, Cheshire.

== 17 February ==
List of shipwrecks: 17 February 1884
Ship	State	Description
Sovereign	United Kingdom	The brig was abandoned off Great Yarmouth, Norfolk. Her crew were rescued by the Gorleston Lifeboat. She subsequently sank.

== 18 February ==
List of shipwrecks: 18 February 1884
Ship	State	Description
Brechin Castle	United Kingdom	The ship was wrecked at Rangoon, Burma. Her crew were rescued. She was on a voyage from New York to .
Christian	Denmark	The schooner was driven ashore and wrecked 3 nautical miles (5.6 km) north of Montrose, Forfarshire, United Kingdom. Her crew were rescued by the Montrose Lifeboat. She was on a voyage from Saint Petersburg, Russia to Aberdeen, United Kingdom.
Laura	United Kingdom	The brig was wrecked at Stronsay, Orkney Islands.

== 21 February ==
List of shipwrecks: 21 February 1884
Ship	State	Description
Kinnaird Castle	United Kingdom	The steamship collided with the steamship Lord John Russell (United Kingdom) and sank in the Thames Estuary. Kinnard Castle was on a voyage from London to Ghent, East Flanders, Belgium.

== 23 February ==
List of shipwrecks: 23 February 1884
Ship	State	Description
Lady Elizabeth	United Kingdom	The barque was severely damaged in a hurricane. She put in to Sydney, New South Wales.
Lolland	Denmark	The steamship was driven ashore at the Fornæs Lighthouse. She was on a voyage from Newcastle upon Tyne, Northumberland, United Kingdom to Nakskov.

== 24 February ==
List of shipwrecks: 24 February 1884
Ship	State	Description
Sibil Wynn	United Kingdom	The brig foundered in the Irish Sea. Her crew survived.

== 25 February ==
List of shipwrecks: 25 February 1884
Ship	State	Description
A. G. Jewett	United States	The brig was abandoned in the Atlantic Ocean (37°30′N 70°15′W). Her crew were rescued by the barquentine Edward Cushing (United States). A. G. Jewett was on a voyage from Philadelphia, Pennsylvania to Matanzas, Cuba.
Earl of Jersey	United Kingdom	The steamship was driven ashore and wrecked on the Cabeza Lozano Reef, 2 nautical miles (3.7 km) west of Rota, Spain.
Hawksbury	United Kingdom	The ship collided with the tugs Gamecock and Knight of the Cross (both United Kingdom) and sank in the River Mersey. Her crew were rescued. Hawksbury was on a voyage from Garston, Lancashire to Plymouth, Devon.
Kotsai	Hong Kong	The steamship suffered a boiler explosion and was wrecked with the loss of seventeen lives.
Thetis	United Kingdom	The steamship was wrecked on the Seaton Rocks, on the coast of Northumberland. All eighteen people on board survived. She was on a voyage from the River Tyne to Blyth, Northumberland.

== 26 February ==
List of shipwrecks: 26 February 1884
Ship	State	Description
Bogense	Denmark	The ship struck a rock and foundered off Ceuta, Spain. Her crew were rescued.
Bordeaux	France	The steamship was driven ashore on Skagen, Denmark. She was refloated with assistance from a number of steamships and taken in to Gothenburg, Sweden.
Goefredo	Portugal	The steamship, was wrecked on the Burbo Bank, in Liverpool Bay. She was on a voyage from Liverpool, Lancashire, United Kingdom to Havana, Cuba.
Surprise	United Kingdom	The ship departed from St. Tudwal's Islands, Caernarfonshire for Bagillt, Flintshire. No further trace, reported overdue.

== 27 February ==
List of shipwrecks: 27 February 1884
Ship	State	Description
Adolphus Augustine	France	The lugger was holed by her anchor and sank off the Mumbles, Glamorgan, United Kingdom.
Friendship	United Kingdom	The schooner was run into by the steamship Widgeon (United Kingdom) at Gravesend, Kent and was severely damaged.
Shamrock	United Kingdom	The steamship was driven ashore at Honfleur, Manche, France. She was refloated the next day.

== 28 February ==
List of shipwrecks: 28 February 1884
Ship	State	Description
Albrecht	Germany	The derelict ship was towed in to the Scattery Roads by the steamship Upton (United Kingdom).
Dunvegan	United Kingdom	The steamship collided with a buoy in the River Wyre and was holed. She was beached at Fleetwood, Lancashire with assistance from the tug Wyre (United Kingdom).
Excel	United Kingdom	The brig was driven ashore and wrecked at South Shields, County Durham. Her crew were rescued. She was on a voyage from London to South Shields.
Hekla	United Kingdom	The steamship ran aground on being launched at Greenock, Renfrewshire. She was refloated the next day.
Magic	United States	The fishing schooner was lost in a gale on Georges Bank with the loss of all twelve crew.
Phoenix	United States	The fishing schooner was lost in a gale on Georges Bank with the loss of all fourteen crew.
Topaz	United Kingdom	The smack collided with the smack Rapid (United Kingdom) and foundered off Fishguard, Pembrokeshire. Her three crew were rescued by the Fishguard Lifeboat.
Yarra	United Kingdom	The barque was wrecked on Scott's Reef. Her crew were rescued. She was on a voyage from Port Darwin, South Australia (now in the Northern Territory), to Falmouth, Cornwall, England.
Zabrina	United Kingdom	The schooner ran aground on the Nore. She was refloated the next day and taken in to Leigh-on-Sea, Essex.

== 29 February ==
List of shipwrecks: 29 February 1884
Ship	State	Description
Minnie	United Kingdom	The ketch foundered in Cardigan Bay 12 nautical miles (22 km) west of the Cardigan Bay Lightship ( Trinity House). Her crew were rescued by the steamship Udea (United Kingdom). Minnie was on a voyage from Brussels, East Flanders, Belgium to Liverpool, Lancashire.
Olderfleet	United Kingdom	The steamship was driven ashore at Carnlough, County Antrim. She was on a voyage from Carnlough to Glasgow, Renfrewshire.
Princess Alexandra	United Kingdom	The steamship ran aground in the Belfast Lough. She was on a voyage from Swansea, Glamorgan to Belfast, County Antrim. She was refloated on 28 March and taken in to Belfast.

== Unknown date ==
List of shipwrecks: Unknown date in February 1884
Ship	State	Description
Acorn	United Kingdom	The smack was driven ashore in Studland Bay. Her crew were rescued.
Acorn	United Kingdom	The steamship was driven ashore on the coast of Spain and damaged. She was on a voyage from Avilés, Spain to Greenock, Renfrewshire. She was refloated and completed her voyage, arriving at Greenock on 28 February.
Admiral	United Kingdom	The pilot boat was run down and sunk by the steamship Tivyside (United Kingdom) off Penarth, Glamorgan. Her crew were rescued by Tivyside.
Albertine Meyer	United Kingdom	The ship was driven ashore at Barnegat, New Jersey, United States. She was on a voyage from Bahia, Brazil to New York, United States. She was a total loss.
Carlin	United Kingdom	The steamship ran aground at Port Glasgow, Renfrewshire. She was later refloated and resumed her voyage.
Charles Loring	United States	The ship collided with Robert Barr (Flag unknown) off Cape Henlopen, South Carolina and was severely damaged. Charles Loring was on a voyage from Matanzas, Cuba to New York. She put in to Philadelphia, Pennsylvania.
Creole	Canada	The brigantine was driven ashore near Halifax, Nova Scotia. She was on a voyage from "Burgeo", Nova Scotia to Sydney, Nova Scotia.
Duguesclin	France	The barque put in to Tenby, Pembrokeshire, United Kingdom in a leaky condition. She was on a voyage from Newport, Monmouthshire, United Kingdom to Seville, Spain. She subsequently sank and became a wreck.
Ellide	United Kingdom	The brig was abandoned off the coast of Essex. Her crew were rescued by Faith (United Kingdom).
Franz Covaceviche	Greece	The ship was abandoned off Jersey, Channel Islands. Her eleven crew were rescued by the steamship Rathkenny (United Kingdom). Franz Covaceviche was on a voyage from Varna, Bulgaria to Falmouth, Cornwall, United Kingdom.
Gem	(United Kingdom of Great Britain and Ireland) Isle of Man	The schooner was wrecked at the Point of Ayre.
Guy Mannering	United Kingdom	The steamship was driven ashore near Belfast, County Antrim. She was later refloated and towed in to Greenock, Renfrewshire by two tugs.
Helena	United Kingdom	The ketch was driven ashore at Grimsby, Lincolnshire.
Hornet	United Kingdom	The steamship foundered off Lundy Island, Devon with the loss of seventeen of her eighteen crew.
Huntingdon	United Kingdom	The schooner was driven ashore in Lough Swilly.
Jane Ann	United Kingdom	The schooner was driven onto the Brig Rocks, off Fife Ness, Fife. Her crew survived.
Kirkstall	United Kingdom	The steamship ran aground on the wreck of John Girvan (United Kingdom) at Weymouth, Dorset. She was on a voyage from Seaham, County Durham to Weymouth.
Mary Coverdale	United Kingdom	The steamship was driven ashore at "Sundly", Öland, Sweden.
Marys	United Kingdom	The schooner was driven ashore and wrecked at Trimingham, Norfolk. Her crew were rescued. She was on a voyage from Goole, Yorkshire to Cowes, Isle of Wight.
Numa	United Kingdom	The barque was driven ashore and damaged at Key West, Florida, United States. She was on a voyage from Pensacola, Florida to Montevideo, Uruguay.
Promise	(United Kingdom of Great Britain and Ireland) Isle of Man	The ship ran aground and was wrecked at Douglas. Her crew were rescued.
Rolandseck	Germany	The steamship was driven ashore at Porto Tolle, Italy. She was on a voyage from Bremen to Venice, Italy.
Sleipner	Norway	The brig was abandoned in the Atlantic Ocean.
Thomas Melville	United Kingdom	The steamship ran aground in the Patapsco River. She was on a voyage from Benisaf, Algeria to Baltimore, Maryland, United States. She was later refloated and taken in to Baltimore.
Turgot	United Kingdom	The steamship ran aground on the Meloria Bank, off Livorno, Italy. She was on a voyage from London to Livorno.
Umatilla	United States	The steamship struck a rock off Cape Flattery, Washington Territory, and sprang a leak. She was towed in to Victoria, British Columbia, Canada, where she sank.
Victoria	United Kingdom	The schooner was wrecked at Minerstown, County Down with the loss of all five crew.
Two unnamed vessels	Flags unknown	The sloops were wrecked on the Clee Ness Sand, off the coast of Lincolnshire.
Unnamed	Flag unknown	The sloop sank off Grimsby.
Unnamed	Flag unknown	The schooner foundered off the coast of County Waterford, United Kingdom on or before 15 February with the loss of at least three lives.
