= Four-wheel drive (disambiguation) =

A four-wheel drive vehicle is a four-wheeled vehicle with a drivetrain that allows all four wheels to receive torque from the engine simultaneously.

The term, or 4 wheel drive, may also refer to:

- Four Wheel Drive, a vehicle manufacturer
- Four-wheel driving, the sport of off-roading
- In Australia, 4WD is sometimes used to refer to a vehicle with four-wheel drive, typically an SUV

== Entertainment ==
- Cupid's Inspiration, a band that earlier performed as 4 Wheel Drive
- Four Wheel Drive (album), a 1975 album by Bachman–Turner Overdrive and the album's title track
- "Four-Wheel Drive", a 2002 song by John Michael Montgomery from Pictures
- "4 Wheel Drive", a 2017 song by Granger Smith from When the Good Guys Win

== See also ==
- FWD (disambiguation)
