= USS Advance =

Six ships of the United States Navy have been named Advance.

- USS Advance (1847) – a brigantine used for an arctic rescue expedition
- USS Advance (1862) – also known as Frolic was a former Confederate blockade runner captured and used as a gunboat
- USS Advance (1917) – an Advance-class patrol boat of World War I
- USS Advance (YT-28) – an Advance-class tugboat of World War I
- USS Advance (AMc-63) – an Accentor-class minesweeper
- USS Advance (MSO-510) – an Acme-class minesweeper
