= Bobby George (restaurateur) =

American restaurateur & convicted felon

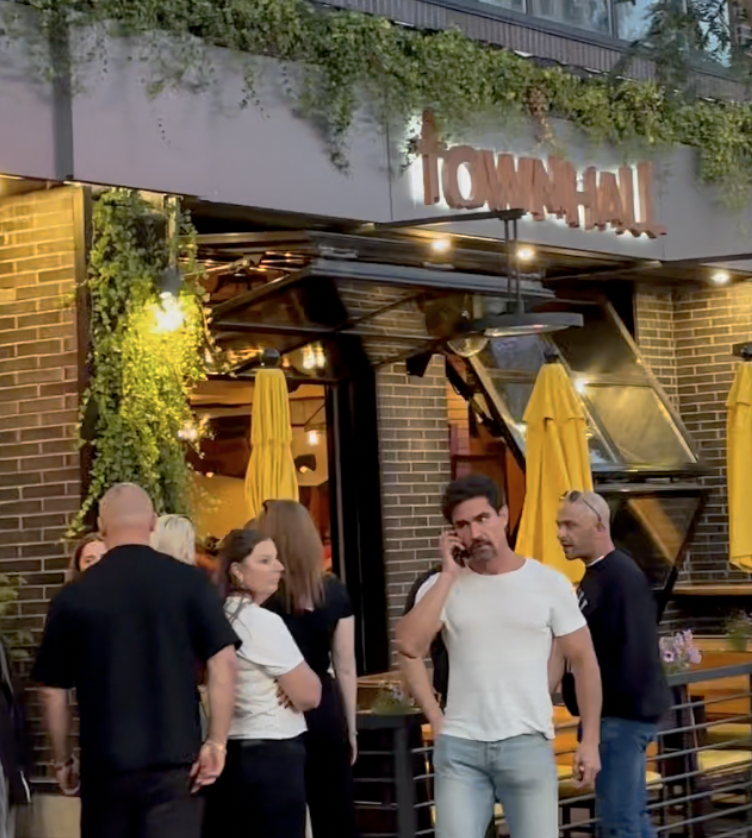
- George (second from right) at TownHall's Columbus location in 2025
- Born: 1980-1981
- Education: Ohio University
- Occupation: Restaurateur

Robert T. George (born 1980-1981) is an American restaurateur known for his restaurants in Cleveland and Columbus, Ohio. George, via his company Ethos Hospitality Group, owns and operates TownHall, Barley House, FWD, Mandrake Rooftop, and REBoL, among other businesses.

George's career and businesses have been the subject of numerous controversies and legal issues. These have consisted of a high-profile altercation with social media personalities at Barley House club in 2017, multiple protests at his venues related to the COVID-19 pandemic and other social issues, and legal challenges involving George himself, including a lawsuit against the city of Cleveland for pandemic restrictions and a 2024 arrest on multiple felony charges, though George's charges were later reduced down to a single felony of strangulation. George pled guilty to this single charge in November 2025.

== Early life ==
George is the son of fellow Cleveland restaurateur Tony George, who throughout the Ohio nuclear bribery scandal was the intermediary between FirstEnergy executives including CEO Chuck Jones and former Speaker of the Ohio House of Representatives Larry Householder. George holds a degree from Ohio University in finance and economics, and his family is known as a major public supporter of Republican Party politicians in Ohio, though George himself donated to candidates of both parties including Hillary Clinton in 2015 during her presidential campaign.

According to George's biography from the Small Business Dealmakers Conference, George is a majority investor in more than 40 firms.

== Career ==
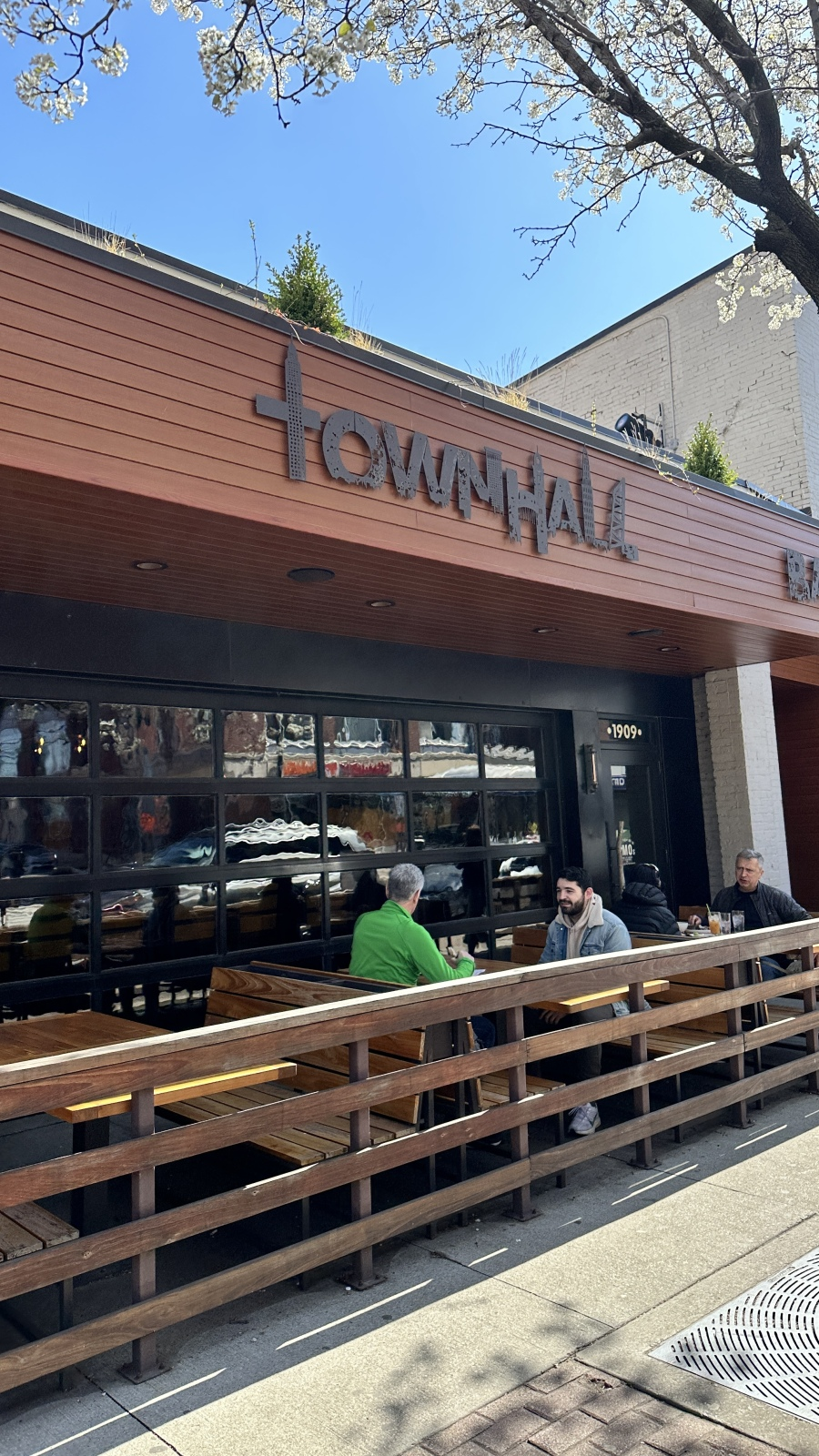
The front of TownHall Ohio City

George's first nightclub was a joint venture with Cleveland Browns first round pick Jeff Faine, named Barley House. This club was located in Akron, and both George and Faine sold it almost a year later. George notes he almost went bankrupt when he used the proceeds to build four new restaurants, including a second Barley House in Cleveland's Warehouse district which opened in 2009 as a venture between himself as majority owner, Faine, and Corey May.

The first TownHall was unveiled in 2013, with it debuting in Cleveland's Ohio City neighborhood, replacing businesses Alaturka and Villa y Zapata. A partnership between George, chef Fabio Salerno, and businessman Sean Heineman, TownHall consisted of both a dine-in area as well as a café for quick-service orders. From the beginning, TownHall committed to putting mostly organic and locally-sourced food on its menu. Six months after opening, TownHall also committed to fully removing genetically modified organisms (GMOs) from its menu; George personally deemed GMOs as "poison" plus comparing them to Agent Orange, and he told Cleveland news outlets that "for every person who argues with me about GMOs, I have 100 customers who say 'Thank you'". He cited his own experience with a liver disease where his doctor suggested he not consume GMOs. George's efforts, while applauded by other local restaurant owners, also incited them to raise concerns on the feasibility of attaining such a goal, and at the time of publication, George was searching for non-GMO soda providers as opposed to The Coca-Cola Company and PepsiCo. George further noted that TownHall was losing "a couple hundred thousand dollars per year" during the switch. The popularity of TownHall among other restaurants however raised concerns among groups of locals worrying that Ohio City would evolve into a late night spot the same way that Cleveland's Warehouse district has, citing George's Barley House specifically.

By 2015, Heineman sold his interest in the group that owns TownHall and Harry Buffalo. Heineman would be convicted of child rape and sentenced in August 2015 to 35 years in prison.

In 2016, George unveiled REBoL, a casual café in downtown Cleveland's Public Square, serving non-GMO bowls as well as steamed bun tacos with a blend of Asian, Indian, and American comfort food.

In September 2016, TownHall hosted a fundraiser for then-candidate Donald Trump. George's name was originally included on the invitation naming him as one of the fundraiser's committee members, though a second invitation later separated his involvement.

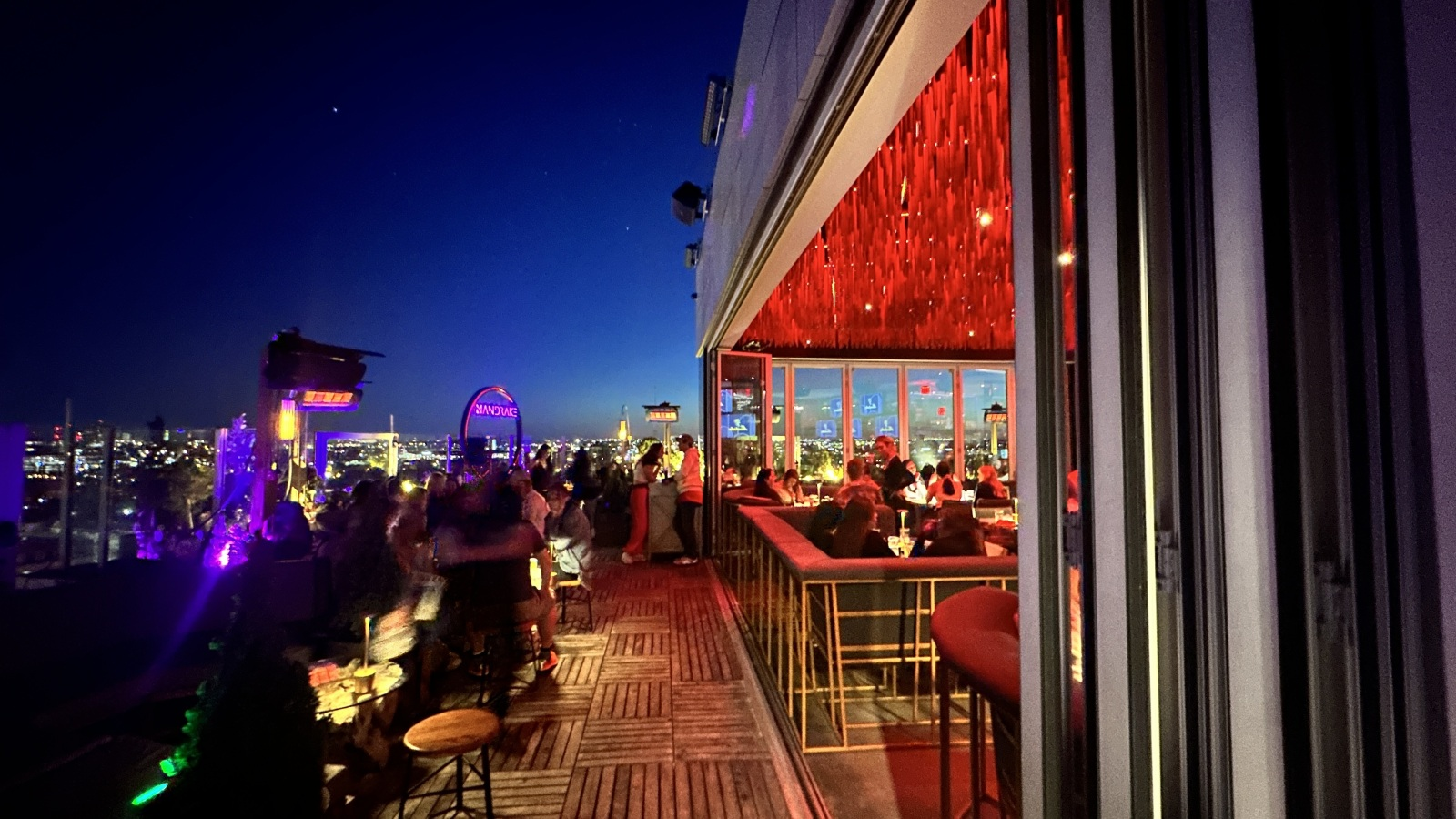
Mandrake Rooftop in 2024

Plans for a Columbus location of TownHall were unveiled as early as January 2018, with George stating that he held off until an ideal location was found. REBoL also expanded to the northwest Columbus suburb of Dublin in 2019, announced originally in 2017. TownHall's Columbus location would open in January 2021, delayed by the COVID-19 pandemic. Ethos also planned to open up a rooftop concept in the same building as TownHall, able to be used year round and spanning 5,000 square feet with indoor and outdoor portions. This space would eventually become Mandrake Rooftop, and it would open in June 2022. Also in June 2022, in the basement of Barley House, George would open Lost Social Club to replace a former venue known as Spybar in 2008 and used for special events previously; Lost was first announced the previous February and involved Ethos partnering with Sandusky hospitality entrepreneur Josh Lang and Cleveland DJ E-V in design and operations.

In June of 2020, TownHall's General Manager, Ryan Hartzell, brought more unwanted attention to the restaurant when he made racist and xenophobic remarks on social media, telling immigrants to "go back to where you came from." George defended Hartzell and announced that Hartzell would not be punished for his actions.

TownHall and Mandrake attracted criticism from Ohio State University's student government in 2023 for their dress code policies. A resolution requesting OSU to acknowlegde off campus dress codes as being potentially discriminatory passed unanimously after Ohio State's student newspaper The Lantern unveiled an investigation where TownHall bouncers denied student vice president Derek Moore because the bouncers could see his underwear line when he lifted up his shirt. Moore concluded that his denial was about his race, and a poll conducted by The Lantern found over 1 in 10 students had been denied from Columbus bars for what they felt were "unjustified reasons".

On July 9, 2023, a mass shooting occurred outside of Barley House, injuring 9 people. George offered a $50,000 reward for any information on the suspect and handed over his security footage to the police and the news channel WKYC. By July 11, Cleveland police and US Marshalls had arrested the suspect.

George and Ethos announced in September 2023 a partnership with the Cleveland Browns and Bally's Corporation to add a sports book to the downtown Cleveland location of Ethos' Harry Buffalo concept.

=== 2017 Barley House incident ===
FULL VIDEO-The Truth about Faze Banks & Alissa Violet Incident @ Barley House
- Security footage uploaded by Barley House to their YouTube channel of the fight involving Alissa Violet and FaZe Banks

On November 26, 2017, YouTube personalities Alissa Butler, known online as Alissa Violet, and Ricky "FaZe Banks" Bengtson, were involved in a brawl at Barley House involving the bar's staff. After the brawl, both posted videos alleging they were assaulted by Barley House staff, where Banks said he was choked out, and Violet shared photos of a black eye and swollen lip on her social media the next day. Banks asserted that the conflict began in a restricted basement bathroom, with him being aggressive toward a bouncer after being asked to leave. The videos posted by Violet and Banks resulted in their fans leaving negative comments and reviews on Barley House's social media pages.

Barley House responded by uploading security footage of Banks and Violet to their YouTube channel, narrated by George's business partner Corey May. The bar also released a statement accusing Violet and Banks of encouraging their audience "to harm our employees physically and emotionally". Banks would later release updated videos on his channel asking his fans to stop attacking Barley House on social media.

=== COVID-19 pandemic response and protests ===
In March 2020, TownHall's social media accounts published claims that drinking bone broth was an acceptable alternative to vaccines. The post received numerous comments criticizing Ethos for spreading pseudoscience and attempting to capitalize off of early fears of the COVID-19 pandemic. George defended the post, saying that its main message was simply to engage in healthy habits.

In July 2020, TownHall, Barley House, and Harry Buffalo's downtown Cleveland location were the sites of protests against the George family organized by the local organization With Peace We Protest, one of the organizations which also organized some of the George Floyd protests in Cleveland. Two individuals, a 25-year old man and a 21-year old woman, used megaphones to amplify their chants at the TownHall protest, though Jacqueline Boyd, George's first cousin and director of operations at TownHall, alleged that she suffered permanent hearing loss from the megaphones; both individuals were later arrested and charged with felony assault. Boyd's medical records later showed no evidence of permanent hearing loss, though George threatened a police officer over the phone in a profanity-filled rant for not immediately arresting the two protestors. Both charges were later dismissed before trial. A 26-year old man was also charged for starting a fire during the protests at REBoL's Public Square location.

Barley House was fined $9,000 on November 14, 2020, for failing to require masks and also failing social distancing. George would later sue the city for imposing unnecessary safety restrictions alongside Sandusky pizzeria chain Cameo Pizza in Erie County after the Kalahari Resorts waterpark in Sandusky successfully won against the state and forced it to lift measures. The state of Ohio would revoke Barley House's liquor license in February 2021, but after filing another suit, a judge restored its liquor license the following July.

=== River Garden and Flats acquisitions ===
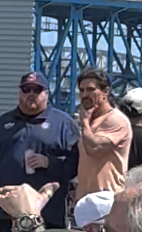
George (right) at FWD in May 2025

In January 2024, George unveiled plans to redevelop an abandoned part of the Flats into a semi-outdoor complex of restaurants named River Garden. Designed by architecture firm Bowen, the complex would replace venues on Old River Road. The project targets 1198, 1204, and 1220 Old River Rd., with only the 1870-built Italianate building at 1220 being preserved and rehabilitated to house new uses, including a 3,860-square-foot, 85-seat ground-floor restaurant.

George, however, suffered a setback when Ohio rescinded surplus state revenue to aid in the construction of River Garden in the wake of George's criminal conviction.

By 2025, George and his affiliates had acquired controlling stakes in many properties of the Flats, including a parking lot adjacent to the Cleveland location of Jimmy Buffett's Margaritaville. Later that year in May, George's partners acquired the outdoor nightclub and dayclub FWD from former owners Michael Schwartz and Bobby Rutter's Forward Hospitaity Group.

=== 2024 Olympics boycott ===
Ethos' concepts boycotted the 2024 Summer Olympics, citing a scene in the Festivité section of the opening ceremony where the "Feast of Dionysus" was taken as offensive by Christian groups as being compared to the Last Supper and Leonardo da Vinci's painting depicting the event. The statements, posted to the accounts for TownHall and REBoL, but also include logos for and saw participation from Green Goat Café and Mandrake.

A local bar near the campus of Ohio State University, Out-R-Inn, parodied Ethos' protest announcement by publishing on its Instagram account that it would be showing the Paris Olympics using a marked-up graphic of Ethos' own announcement.

=== 2024 arrest and 2025 attempted strangulation conviction ===
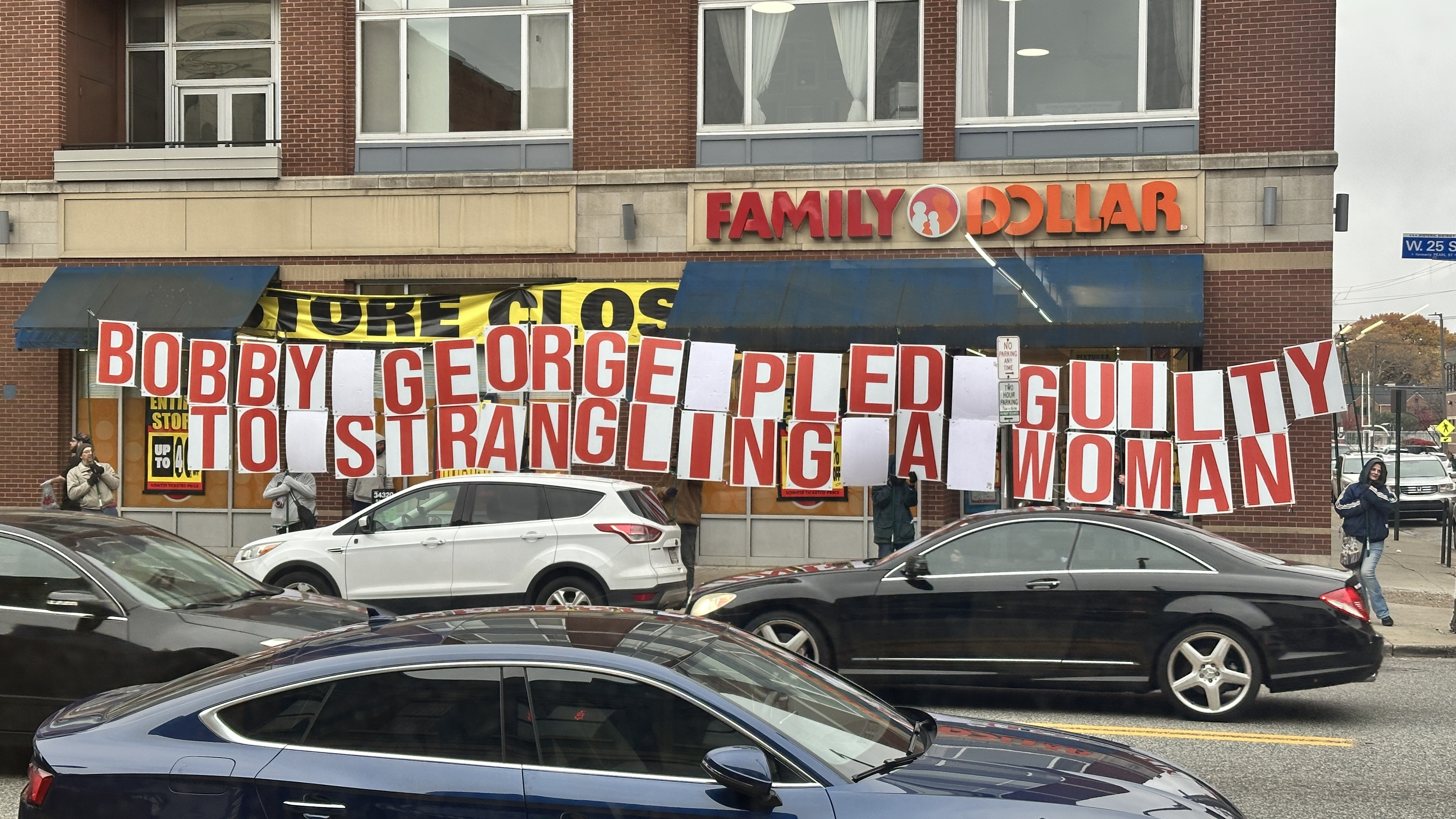
A November 2025 protest in Cleveland against George after he pled guilty to attempted strangulation

On August 11, 2024, local news reported that an arrest warrant was out for George, which consisted of nine felonies, including rape, strangulation, kidnapping and attempted murder. on multiple felony charges. George turned himself in the next day, and his bond was set at $200,000, which he posted to secure his release while awaiting further proceedings. The allegations detailed events which occurred between November 2023 and July 2024. Specific accusations include physically assaulting his girlfriend, choking, gun threats, shoving a towel down her throat, and sexual assault. According to court documents, these alleged acts resulted in injuries, including a concussion and post-concussion syndrome. George entered no plea at the time, and his case currently awaits a grand jury indictment. The delay of George's trial has been criticized by Ohio podcasters and newspapers, such as Today in Ohio's hosts who called the delays around George's trial "ridiculous". Furthermore, George's attorneys accused the Cleveland chief prosecutor of bias because a letter sent late last year by a group of Democratic organizers urged Cleveland prosecutors to avoid George's concepts.

George was formally indicted on information of one count of attempted felony strangulation on October 27, 2025. George's attorney, Kevin Spellacy, stated to local news sources that the one count was concluded on as part of an agreement with the City of Cleveland, with Spellacy calling the original nine accusations from 2024 as George being "grossly overcharged".

George agreed to plead guilty to the single attempted strangulation charge on November 3, 2025, and was sentenced to probation. He was sentenced to 20 hours of community service within six months as well as five years of probation, locally known as community control. George would state through his attorneys to local newspapers that he was "not admitting to a crime but rather acknowledging taking a single step toward a crime", and called his prosecution politically motivated while further comparing himself to US president Donald Trump. George and his attorney later sent "empty" lawsuit threats via cease and desist letters to online social media personalities who mentioned the original charges and his guilty plea, attracting scrutiny from Case Western Reserve University's law clinic director for George attempting to place his "hurt feelings" above the First Amendment.

=== 2025 Columbus protest ===
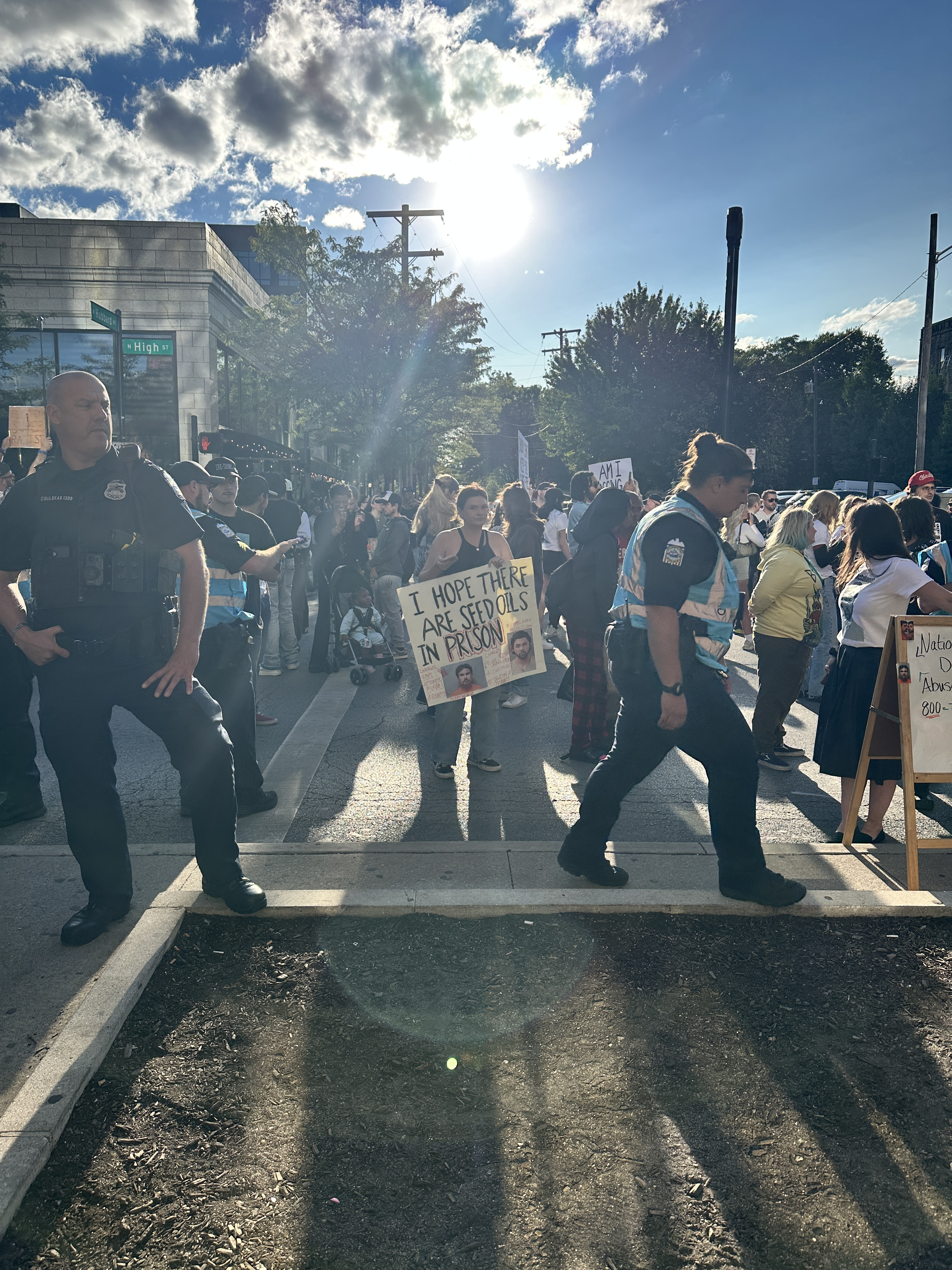
A protest in September 2025 at TownHall's Columbus location against George and former employee Roen McCullough

On September 6, 2025, protestors demonstrated outside of TownHall and Mandrake's Columbus location urging for the conviction of George and of former Ohio State long snapper Michael Roen McCullough, who worked at TownHall and Mandrake previously and was arrested in August 2025 for assaulting his girlfriend. McCullough's since-deleted LinkedIn profile stated him as Director of Hospitality for Ethos, and McCullough was arrested at Mandrake. One protestor interviewed by Columbus' NBC affiliate WCMH-TV, who identified herself as being a close friend of McCullough's victim, noted her primary motive was to spread awareness of domestic violence.

Ethos released a statement alleging that one of the leaders of the protest threatened violence against George and consistently visited both TownHall's Columbus location and George's residence. George also alleged a brick was thrown into his house with "YOU WILL DIE SOON" written on it.

== Restaurants and concepts ==
According to George via his attorneys after his guilty plea to the attempted strangulation charge, George's businesses employ approximately 2,000 people across all his restaurants and other businesses.

=== TownHall ===
TownHall is a health-focused restaurant and bar concept with locations in Cleveland's Ohio City neighborhood and the Short North in Columbus. Its core mission is to promote "balance" and "wellness," a philosophy embodied by its commitment to using organic, locally-sourced, and non-GMO ingredients. The restaurant has an in-house nutritionist who helps develop the menu and provides science-based nutritional content. TownHall's menu is diverse, drawing from global cuisines to offer a variety of options including handhelds, bowls, and salads, and accommodates various dietary needs such as paleo, keto, and vegan. Notable menu items include the Grass-Fed Cheeseburger, various "build-your-own" bowls, and a selection of cold-pressed juices and coffee drinks. The restaurant's coffee is a key feature, advertised as "zero-toxin" and independently tested for molds and mycotoxins. TownHall also includes a full-service bar with a wide selection of craft beers. The design of the restaurant blends a lounge-like ambiance with an industrial aesthetic, using a combination of reclaimed wood, metal, stucco, and concrete floors. The space is divided into a dine-in area and a café for quick-service orders.

=== Barley House, Lost Social Club, and The Grotto ===
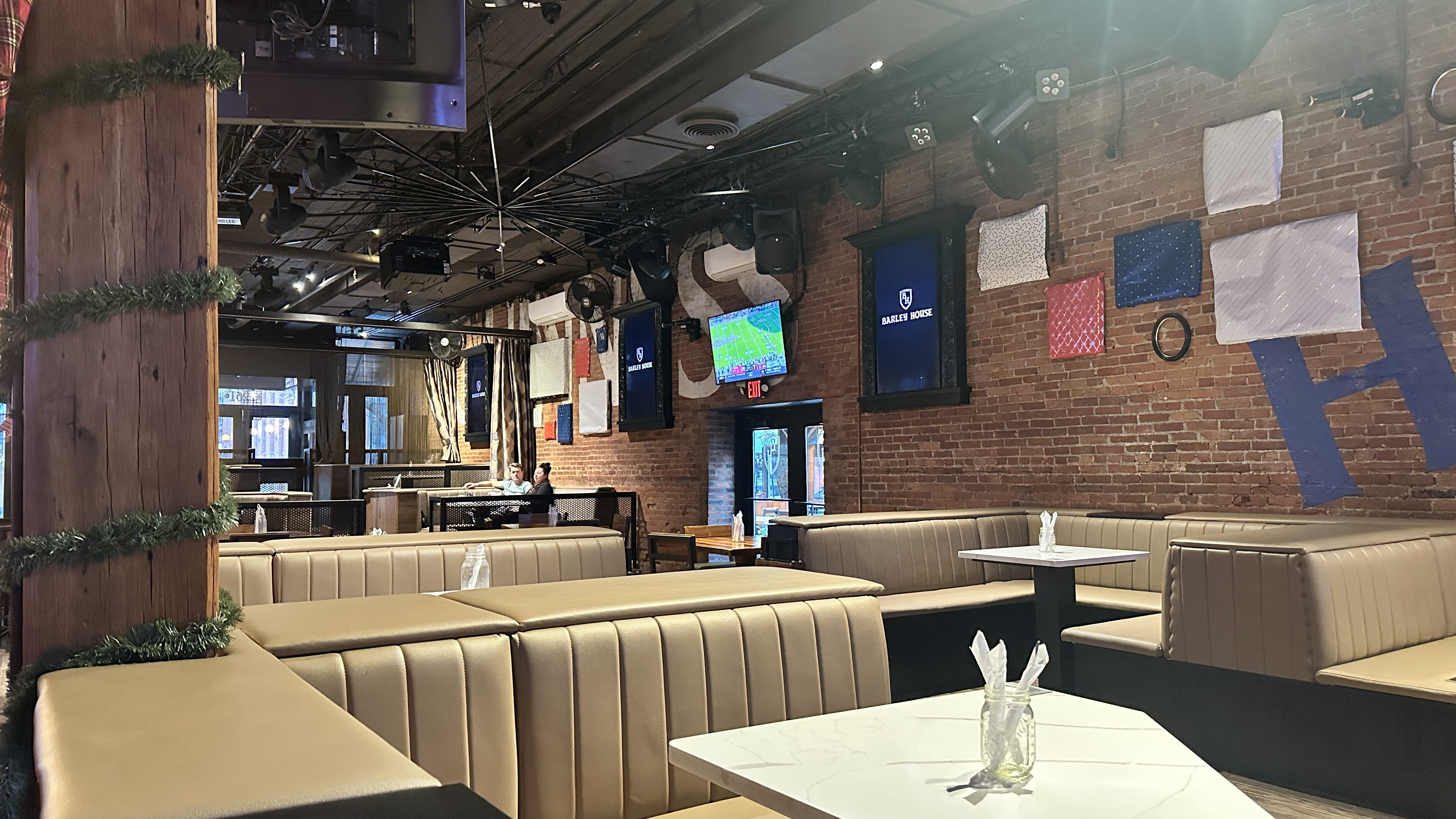
Barley House in 2025

One of George's first ventures, Barley House is a bar and restaurant located in Cleveland's Warehouse District. It features a dual concept, operating as a casual American pub during the day and transitioning into a nightclub in the evening. Its menu offers a variety of traditional American and pub-style dishes, including items like wings, burgers, and a selection of pizzas. The design of the space includes rustic decor, with a large main dining area, a patio with cabanas. The building also hosts Lost Social Club in its basement, and a cigar lounge named The Grotto in the back.

Barley House was one of the most popular Warehouse District clubs in 2010. The club imposed a dress code during that era in an attempt to reduce risk and gang affiliation, particularly requiring that hats must be worn pointed straight forward or straight back, as Barley House believed that sideways hats were a gang symbol. Barley House banned sleeveless shirts, known as "wifebeaters", from being worn in the club.

=== Mandrake Rooftop ===
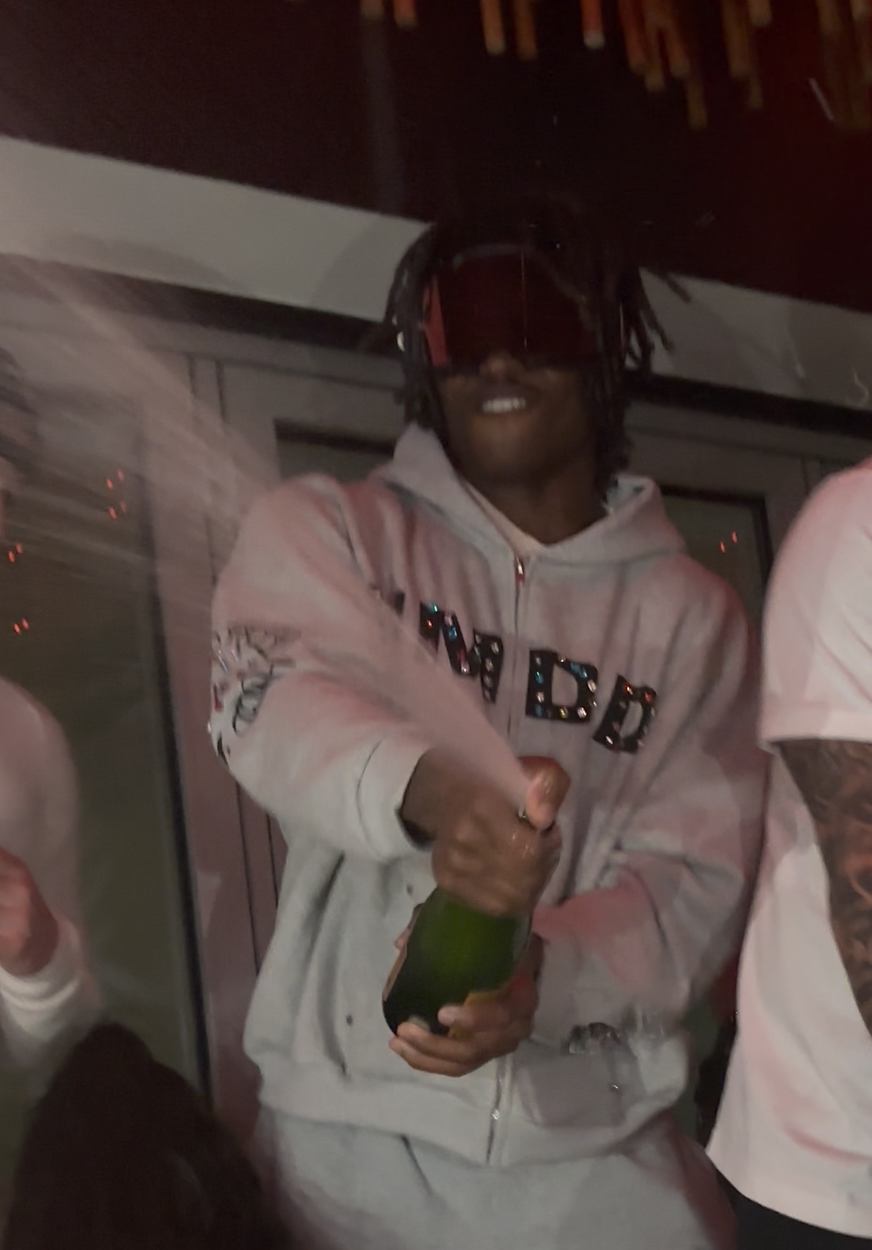
Ohio State Buckeyes football player Jeremiah Smith at Mandrake during a 2025 victory party

Mandrake Rooftop is a restaurant and lounge located in Columbus, Ohio, atop the Short North's Moxy Hotel with a 270º rooftop. At the time of opening, Mandrake's rooftop was the tallest in the Short North. The concept serves Mediterranean and Asian fusion cuisine featuring a variety of shared plates, sushi, hummus, flat breads, lamb chops, and tapas. The venue operates as a restaurant during the day and transitions into a nightclub with a small dance floor in the evenings. The venue claims to have "the world's healthiest sushi", which while one reviewer attracting criticism from local newspapers and guides for hyperbole.

=== REBoL ===
REBoL (pronounced "rebel") is a fast-casual build-your-own-bowl health-food concept with locations that have included Cleveland's Public Square and the Columbus suburb Dublin. It shares the same core philosophy as TownHall, centered on a 100% non-GMO and primarily organic menu, emphasizing options for gluten free, vegan, paleo-friendly and keto diets. The restaurant emphasizes "clean" ingredients, including grass-fed meats, locally-sourced produce, and house-made sauces. The menu is structured around a customizable, build-your-own model, accommodating various dietary needs such as paleo, keto, and vegan. REBoL also features a prominent "zero-toxin" coffee bar, with beans tested for molds and mycotoxins, and select locations include a full-service bar. The design typically features an industrial-modern aesthetic with a service counter for quick-service and dine-in orders.

When Public Square's REBoL reopened in 2021 after the COVID-19 pandemic, the restaurant added cannabidiol-infused products and ketogenic chocolates.

REBoL currently hosts two locations, one in Cleveland's Public Square and another in the Columbus suburb of Dublin. REBoL is due to open a third location in Westerville, another suburb of Columbus.

=== FWD ===
FWD (pronounced "forward") is an outdoor open-air dayclub and nightclub located in Cleveland's Flats East Bank. The club was conceived in 2015 by Bobby Rutter and Michael Schwartz, and was first opened by Forward Hospitality Group, a company named from the club. The group sold FWD in 2025 to George.
