= Advancement =

Advancement may refer to:

- Fronting (phonetics)
- Advancement (inheritance)
- Promotion (rank)
- Fundraising

== See also ==
- Advance (disambiguation)
