= Foreword (disambiguation) =

A foreword is a portion preceding the main body of a book.

Foreword may also refer to:

- Foreword (Crimson Lotus EP), by Finnish band Crimson Lotus
- Foreword (Moving Mountains EP), by New York band Moving Mountains
- Foreword (Tori Kelly EP), by American singer-songwriter Tori Kelly
- "Foreword", a song by American rapper Tyler, The Creator, on the 2017 album Flower Boy
- "Foreword", a song by Linkin Park on the 2003 album Meteora

== See also ==
- Forward (disambiguation)
