= Onward =

Onward or onwards may refer to:

== Entertainment ==
=== Film ===
- Onward (film), an animated Pixar film released in 2020

=== Music ===
- "Onward" (1978 Yes song), from the 1978 album Tormato by the British band Yes
- "Onwards", a song by the Afro Celt Sound System from the 2001 album Volume 3: Further in Time
- Onwards (album), 2006, by the Norwegian band Triosphere
- "Onwards!", a 2010 song from the fifth series of Doctor Who.
- Onward (album), 2012, by the British band Hawkwind
- Onward Brass Band, the name of two orchestras in New Orleans

== Places ==
- Onward, Indiana, a town in the United States
- Onward, Mississippi, an unincorporated community in the United States

== Vehicles ==
- USS Onward, U.S.Navy ship name
  - USS Onward (1852), clipper ship, served as US Navy ship in the Civil War
  - USS Onward (SP-311), WWI patrol yacht
  - USS Onward II (SP-728), WWI patrol motorboat
- Onward (locomotive), a steam locomotive with polygonal driving wheels
- Onward (sternwheeler 1858), a steamboat on the Willamette River
- Onward (sternwheeler 1867), a steamboat on the Tualatin River

== Other uses ==
- En Marche!, political movement founded by Emmanuel Macron, President of France, frequently called "Onwards!" in English.
- Onward Homes, housing association in North West England
- Onward, a centre-right think tank in the United Kingdom, established in 2018
- Onward, a magazine formerly known as the Universalist Union, published by the Young People's Christian Union from 1893 to 1945.
