= Looking Ahead =

Looking Ahead may refer to:

- Looking Ahead (Billy Joe Royal album), 1987
- Looking Ahead (Ricky Ford album), 1986
- Looking Ahead (Ken McIntyre album), 1960
- Looking Ahead, a 1948 novel by Vera Panova
- Looking Ahead!, a 1958 album by Cecil Taylor
- Lookin' Ahead, a 1962 by The Jazz Crusaders

== See also ==
- Lookahead (disambiguation)
- Ahead (disambiguation)
