= FWD =

FWD may refer to:

== Businesses and organisations ==
- Far Western District of the Barbershop Harmony Society, an American music charity (founded 1946)
- Four Wheel Drive, an American vehicle manufacturer (1909–2003)
- FWD.us, an American lobby group (founded 2015)
- FWD Group, a Hong-Kong–based insurance multinational (founded 2013)

== Places ==
- FWD (club), a seasonal outdoor nightclub and dayclub in Cleveland, Ohio
- FWD Tower, office building in Jakarta, also known as Pacific Century Palace Jakarta

== Technology ==
- Falling weight deflectometer, in civil engineering
- Fixed wireless data, in telecommunications
- Four-wheel drive (often 4WD), of motor vehicles
- Free World Dialup, a voice over IP network
- Front-wheel drive, of motor vehicles

== Television ==
- Fear the Walking Dead, a 2015 horror drama spin-off series

== See also ==
- Forward (disambiguation)
