= Forward (surname) =

Forward is a surname. People bearing it include:

- Allen Forward (1921–1994), Welsh international rugby union player
- Chauncey Forward (1793–1839), American politician
- Jonathan Forward, (1680–1760), English merchant
- Oliver Forward (1781–1834), America government official
- Robert L. Forward (1932–2002), American physicist and writer

- Bob Forward (born 1958), American film director and son of Robert L. Forward
- Eve Forward (born 1972), American writer and daughter of Robert L. Forward

- Walter Forward (1786–1852), American jurist, politician, and government administrator
- Steve Forward (born 1954), English recording engineer and producer

== See also ==
- Forward (disambiguation)
