= Go-Ahead =

Go-Ahead or Go Ahead may refer to:

- Go-Ahead Group, British transport operator
- Go Ahead Eagles, Dutch football club
- "Go Ahead", a song from Alicia Keys's album As I Am
- "Go Ahead", a song from Rilo Kiley's album Take Offs and Landings
- Go Ahead, the second album by Linx
- Go Ahead (band), a band formed by Grateful Dead members Brent Mydland and Bill Kreutzmann
- Go Ahead (TV series), a Chinese drama series first aired in 2020
- Go Ahead!, a 1978 album by Tatsuro Yamashita
- Go Ahead, a snack foods brand targeted at dieters, formerly owned by McVitie's and now part of Pladis Foods
