= Lookahead =

Lookahead or Look Ahead may refer to:

- A parameter of some combinatorial search algorithms, describing how deeply the graph representing the problem is explored
- A parameter of some parsing algorithms; the maximum number of tokens that a parser can use to decide which rule to use
- In dynamic range compression, a signal processing design to avoid compromise between slow attack rates that produce smooth-sounding gain changes, and fast attack rates capable of catching transients
- Look-ahead (backtracking), a subprocedure that attempts to predict the effects of choosing a branching variable to evaluate or one of its values
- Lookahead carry unit, a logical unit in digital circuit design used to decrease calculation time in adder units
- Look Ahead, a charitable housing association in London
- In regular expressions, an assertion to match characters after the current position

== Education ==
- Look Ahead, 1990s English as a foreign language multimedia classroom project by BBC English and other organisations

== Music ==
- Look Ahead (Pat Boone album), 1968
- Look Ahead, 1992 album by Gerald Veasley
- Look Ahead, 1995 album by Danny Tenaglia
- "Look Ahead", 1992 song by Pat Metheny on the album Secret Story
- "Look Ahead", 2014 song by rapper Future, on the album Honest (Future album)

== See also ==
- Looking Ahead (disambiguation)
