= Onward (locomotive) =

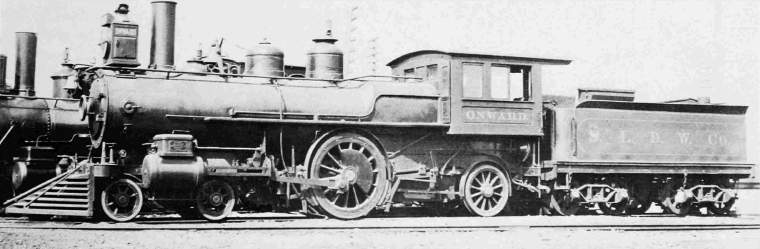
Swinerton Locomotive Onward

The steam locomotive Onward had polygonal driving wheels. This rather ineffective locomotive with only one driving axle was built in 1887 by the Hinkley Locomotive Works in Boston for the Swinerton Locomotive Driving Wheel Company.

== History ==
In 1887, the Swinerton Locomotive Driving Wheel Company in the United States received a unique locomotive boldly called Onward, which had been built by the Hinkley Locomotive Works of Boston. Its unique feature was that its wheels were not round. The company's founder, C. E. Swinerton, had specified that both driving wheels should actually be polygons with 118 sides, each flat segment being about 2 inches (51 millimetres) long. He sought to demonstrate that the line contact at each segment's junction would have higher rail adhesion than a circular wheel, which was only meant to have a point contact. However this was actually not the case, as even steel deforms under enough pressure, so there is in fact a contact area even with a circular wheel.

The 4-2-2 locomotive had one single driving axle. This wheel arrangement had largely been abandoned elsewhere because of its poor adhesion, but was probably chosen to emphasize the effectiveness of the invention. The Onward was tried on several north-eastern lines, but did not prove to be beneficial, and thus failed to convince practical railway men. It is likely that the non-constant radius would have caused tremendous amount of vibration.

It was sold to the Portland & Rochester Railroad (P&R) after the polygonal driving wheels had been replaced with conventional round ones. After a few years, the P&R sent it to the Manchester Locomotive Works for reconstruction as an ordinary eight-wheeler. Onward was scrapped in 1905.
