= USS Advance (YT-28) =

Patrol vessel of the United States Navy

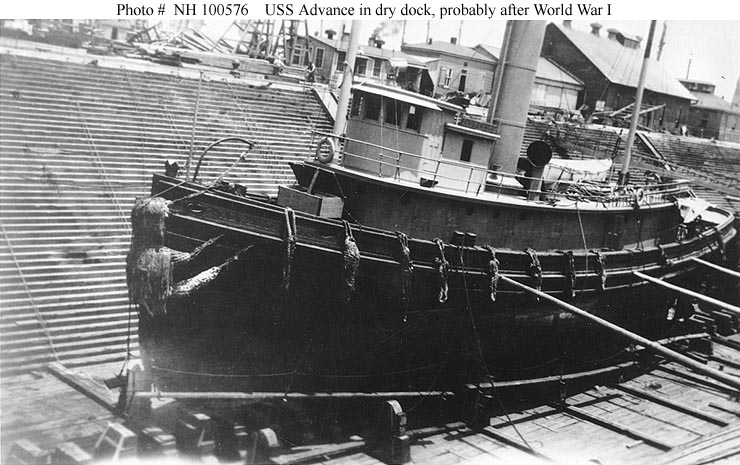
- USS Advance (YT-28) In dry dock, probably after World War I.

History

United States
- Name: USS Advance
- Builder: M. M. Davis Solomons Island, Maryland
- Laid down: 1912
- Launched: 1912
- Acquired: 27 July 1918
- Commissioned: 27 July 1918
- Decommissioned: 7 June 1933
- Stricken: 12 December 1933
- Home port: Norfolk, Virginia
- Fate: Sold, 14 June 1934

General characteristics
- Tonnage: 167 GRT
- Length: 107 ft 6 in (32.77 m)
- Beam: 22 ft 8 in (6.91 m)
- Draught: 11 ft 5 in (3.48 m)
- Speed: 11 knots
- Complement: 14

USS Advance (YT-28) was an Advance-class tugboat acquired by the United States Navy for the task of patrolling American coastal waters during the First World War.

In June or July 1918, the fourth vessel to be named Advance (Id. No. 3057) by the Navy—a tug built in 1912 at Solomons Island, Maryland, by M. M. Davis—was acquired by the Navy from A. J. Taylor & Bros., Washington, D.C., and was placed in commission on 27 July 1918.

== World War I service as a patrol craft ==
For the duration of World War I, she served as a patrol vessel assigned to the 5th Naval District and was based at Norfolk, Virginia. Following the end of hostilities, she became a harbor tug at Norfolk and remained so employed for the rest of her Navy career.

== Redesignated as a tugboat ==
She was designated YT-28 on 17 July 1920 when the Navy adopted the alphanumeric system of hull designations. Advance remained active at Norfolk until 7 June 1933, when she was decommissioned and berthed at the Philadelphia Navy Yard.

== Decommissioning ==
Her name was struck from the Navy Directory on 12 December 1933; and she was sold to Mr. Martin J. Carroll, Brooklyn, New York, on 14 June 1934.
