= Advance (newspaper) =

English-language newspaper published in Sudan

- Type: Weekly newspaper
- Editor: Joseph Garang
- Founded: 1955
- Political alignment: Communist
- Language: English language

Advance was an English-language weekly newspaper published in Sudan. The newspaper was published by the Sudanese Communist Party, functioning as its organ for the South. Advance was founded in 1955. It was edited by Joseph Garang.

Between 1961 and 1965 Garang published his positions on the Southern question in a series of articles, calling for democratization and regional autonomy. Those articles, which would define the party line on the Southern question, were later compiled into the pamphlet The Dilemma of the Southern Intellectual when Garang became Minister of State for Southern Affairs in 1971.

As of the late 1970s, when the Communist Party had been forced underground, publication of Advance was sporadic.
