= Straight Ahead =

Straight Ahead may refer to:

- Straight-ahead jazz, a jazz music style
- Straight ahead animation, a method of animation
- Straight Ahead (Abbey Lincoln album), 1961
- Straight Ahead (band), an American hardcore punk band
- Straight Ahead (David "Fathead" Newman album), 1961
- Straight Ahead (Oliver Nelson album), 1961
- Straight Ahead!, a 1964 The Goldebriars album
- Straight Ahead! (Junior Mance album), 1964
- Basie Straight Ahead, 1968
- Straight Ahead (Eddie "Lockjaw" Davis album), 1976
- Straight Ahead! (Freddie Redd album), 1977
- Straight Ahead (Art Blakey album), 1981
- Straight Ahead (Amy Grant album), 1984
- Straight Ahead (Greg Sage album), 1985
- Straight Ahead (Stanley Turrentine album), 1986
- Straight Ahead (Ignite album), 1996
- Straight Ahead (Pennywise album), also its title track "Straight Ahead", 1999
- "Straight Ahead", a Kool & the Gang song on their album In the Heart
- "Straight Ahead", a Jimi Hendrix song on the posthumous 1997 album First Rays of the New Rising Sun
- "Straight Ahead" (Tube & Berger song), a 2004 song by Tube & Berger featuring Chrissie Hynde
