= Advance (shipwrecked 1933) =

Screw steamer

History
- Name: Advance
- Owner: North Coast Steam Navigation Company
- Ship registration number: Unknown
- Ship official number: 69
- Fate: Wrecked

General characteristics
- Type: Screw steamer
- Ship primary use: Transport
- Ship industry: -
- Ship passenger capacity: Unknown

Advance was a screw steamer that was wrecked when she sprang a leak whilst carrying tea-tree saplings between Taree, New South Wales and Coopernook. She was lost on the Manning River, New South Wales on 17 June 1933.

The wreck has not been located, but her approximate coordinates are 31.88°S 152.7°E.
