= Sunline Coach Company =

U.S. Recreational Vehicle Manufacturer

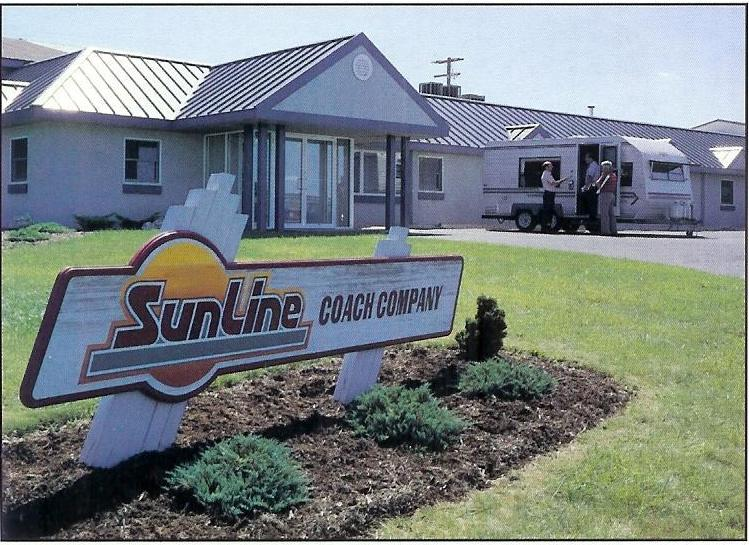
- Sunline Coach Main Office, 245 S. Muddy Creek Road
- Type: Privately held company
- Industry: Recreational Vehicles
- Founded: 1964 in Hinkletown, Pennsylvania, United States
- Founders: Wayne Weaver, Lewis Martin
- Defunct: December 29, 2006
- Fate: Chapter 7 Bankruptcy
- Headquarters: 245 S. Muddy Creek Road, Denver, Pennsylvania, USA
- Number of locations: 2 (2005)
- Products: Recreational vehicles, storage sheds
- Production output: About 70,000 units (2006)
- Brands: Solaris, Slide Room, Que, Tran-Sport, Advancer, Saturn, Sole, Satellite, Seville, Orbiter, Sunspot, SunRay, StarRay, Runabout, Sportster, Spacelyte, Windrak, Highline, Lowline, Skyway, Porta-Camper, SunRider V, MicroCruiser, Coyote
- Revenue: US $18,000,000 (2006)
- Number of employees: 230 (2005)
- Parent: Sunline Acquisition Company

Sunline Coach Company was a manufacturer of recreational vehicles, truck bed caps, and household storage sheds from 1964 to November, 2006. Vehicles were primarily built at a production facility in Denver, Pennsylvania, or at a smaller location in Leola. The company built about 70,000 travel trailers, truck campers, fifth wheels, and motorhomes over their 42-year history.

== The early days of Sunline, 1964–1974 ==
The company was founded by Wayne Weaver and Lewis Martin, in a small garage in Hinkletown, Pennsylvania. The pair started with building backyard storage sheds in the early 1960s, and then later built a truck camper for Wayne Weaver's cross-country honeymoon trip in 1964. After the trip, they decided to expand the business and build more truck campers in Schoeneck. Production outgrew that facility and prompted a move to Akron in 1967.

The company officially incorporated in 1968 and moved to their final location at 245 S. Muddy Creek Road in Denver. in 1969, near the junction of Route 222 and the Pennsylvania Turnpike. The factory was recognizable along the turnpike from a large travel trailer shaped billboard, complete with hubcaps, mounted up on the hill. The first Sunline travel trailer was built in 1971, with fifth wheels following shortly after.

== 1975–1987 ==
In 1975, Wayne Weaver left Sunline, thus breaking the partnership. John Zimmerman and Wayne Lawrence Sr. joined the team from nearby RV manufacturer Shasta Industries. Product lines changed to align with the smaller cars and trucks of the time due to the fuel crisis and Sunline focused on lightweight construction methods that could be towed by these new, less powerful vehicles

Notable products of the late 1970s were the Sunline Sunspot and the Sunline Solaris. The Sunspot, a small, lightweight, teardrop style trailer with a rear opening chuckwagon kitchen, could be towed by small economy cars such as the Volkswagen Rabbit. The Solaris, a new motorhome built on a Datsun EHL620 chassis, featured a 119 cubic inch four cylinder engine designed for fuel economy.

In 1983, the company expanded operations by acquiring the property directly across the street for a new production, parts, R&D, and customer service facility. The new facility was located at 985 Stone Hill Road.

== 1988–1994 ==
While the small, lightweight floorplans remained, Sunline began to offer larger floorplans in the mid-1980s, with more luxurious fabrics and option choices. Luxuries such as air conditioning and plush velour furniture became popular options never available before. Hardwood cabinet doors and other wood accents became optional and standard in the uplevel Seville line of travel trailers and truck campers. Sunline also introduced two entry-level models in the late 1980s, the SunRay, and StarRay to attract younger and budget minded customers.

With the trend toward larger trailers and needing more room to manufacture, Sunline acquired the former Shasta Industries plant at 40 Hess Road in Leola. It was a considerably smaller facility than Sunline's main campus, but this facility assumed most production of the larger trailers and fifth wheels. The last Leola built Sunline left the plant in 2004, as a 2005 model.

1990 was Sunline's 25th anniversary, with a road ahead theme. The beige exterior of the 1980s was replaced with an all-new light gray in 1990, but it was quickly replaced with polar white in 1992. The new polar white aluminum had Krystal Kote coating, designed to help prevent scratches and dents.

== 1995-1999 ==
Sunline's 30th anniversary was in 1995, with trailers featuring all new decal packages. An especially notable feature of 1995 model Sunlines was the addition of power slide rooms to two fifth wheel models. The slide room concept had been around in the RV industry since the 1970s and power slide outs since 1990, but this was Sunline's first application of them.

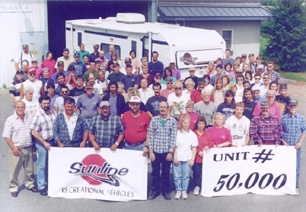
50,000th Sunline, a 2000 T-2370. 8/26/99.

The Saturn travel trailer line was launched in 1996. It was an economical/entry level travel trailer, built with the same materials as the rest, just with less features and a lower price point. Most notably, the new 1996 Sunline Saturn line had multiple floorplan options with slide rooms, ranging from 28' to 36' in length. All Sunline Slide Rooms at this time were large couch/dinette combo.

The largest Slide Room trailers, the T-32SS and T-36SS, became common choices for destination trailers at a campground seasonal site, and had a new optional sliding glass patio door to encourage more permanent use. With the Slide Room models gaining popularity, the Slide Room idea was moved into its own model for 1998 and 1999, simply called the Sunline Slide Room. The Saturn non-slide models saw a mild visual redesign that allowed the Slide Rooms to rebrand.

Sunline's first website was launched in 1997, as was the first email address. The website featured new model information, warranty information, a company store for apparel, and a customer photos section.

The 50,000th Sunline was produced on August 26, 1999, as a 2000 Sunline Solaris T-2370.

== 2000–2004 ==
Sunline's 35th anniversary occurred in 2000. The celebration brought the introduction of a new exterior decal with shade shifting vinyl. The 2000 brochure featured a large collage of Sunline's past, including the original truck camper, the original Sunline lightning logo, various old pictures of the plant, and the new logo.

Sunline launched a new line of apparel for owners to purchase to coincide with the anniversary, both via the online store or in person at the plant. A custom snowglobe was offered as well, with only 1008 hand-numbered snowglobes produced. It featured a camping scene with a 2000 Sunline trailer, mountain backdrop, and plays Willie Nelson's "On the Road Again". Many of these snowglobes are still seen today at many RV dealerships.

Since the entry level Saturn line was discontinued in 1999, a replacement for it was created reviving the Advancer name in 2000. It was designed to appeal to younger buyers, and featured aluminum framing, a tapered body design for better towing, and other unique features. The idea for this design came from employee Skip Hershey and was in the works for five years. The Advancer and Advancer Lite trailers were produced from 2000 to 2002. Trailer Life Magazine tested a 2000 model with a 1999 Cadillac Escalade for the October, 1999 issue.

Whether modifying a floorplan to make it wheelchair accessible, adding larger windows or deleting windows, or replacing a queen bed with twin beds, Sunline often modified existing floorplans for a customer's needs. One notable customization is the Breath Express, a custom 2004 Sunline Slide Room built for the American Lung Association of Eastern Connecticut as a mobile exhibit to teach school children about the effects of smoking and asthma. Sunline also assisted one of their dealers, Rayewood Trailer Sales of Sussex, NJ, with providing a 2001 T-360SR to a demolition crew working at the site of the World Trade Center building #7 after the September 11th attacks. Sunline matched employee donations and donated $1200 to the American Red Cross for disaster relief.

After the discontinuation of the previous fifth wheel models in 1996, a new fifth wheel line was launched for the 2002 model year. Built only at the Leola plant, these high end fifth wheels featured full fiberglass exteriors, front and rear fiberglass caps, multiple slide outs, oak interiors, and line specific fabric choices. They were built for with full-time/snowbird use in mind, and as such, are known to be quite heavy for their size.

== 40th Anniversary, 2004–05 ==
In February, 2004, it was announced that Sunline Coach would be sold. The past owners retired and sold the company to a group of investors known as Sunline Acquisition Company, but the company would operate as Sunline Coach Company as they always had.

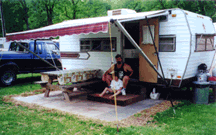
1971 Sunline 21RB Contest Winner, the oldest Sunline.

Following tradition, calendar year 2004/model year 2005 meant the 40th anniversary of Sunline. Early in 2004, Sunline announced a special contest for the anniversary, the search for the oldest Sunline still on the road. After months of taking customer submissions, all of which were featured on the Sunline website, the oldest Sunline was found nearby in Pennsylvania, a 1971 21' RB travel trailer. The winners of the contest won the option to exchange their 1971 Sunline in for a brand new 2005 Sunline T-279SR, which they did. Ten of the runner up contestants won Sunline memorabilia, including the owner of one original Sunline barn.

Sunline joined the toy hauler segment in 2005 with the introduction of the Tran-Sport. Initially offered in one floorplan, the trailer had a patio side ramp to the garage and a vapor barrier wall between the garage and living area. A longer floorplan was later introduced with a larger, rear-ramp garage. Both floorplans had optional fold down bunks in the garage.

When Hurricane Katrina caused major devastation to the Gulf Coast in August 2005, FEMA reached out to multiple RV manufacturers to supply the storm ravaged area with temporary housing. Starting in September, Sunline committed to building up to 1000 special 2006 T-30F models for FEMA. Many Sunline employees and local businesses stocked each trailer shipped out with bottled water, canned goods, and other necessities to help the new residents get back on their feet. Sunline T-30Fs were auctioned off by GSA Auctions at the end of use, along with many other FEMA trailers. Early production T-30Fs have Sunline logo decals on the front and rear, but later ones do not, which make it difficult to identify from other FEMA trailers.

== The end of Sunline, 2006 ==
Sunline launched an all new trailer called the Que in the 2007 model year. It was the smallest Sunline trailer in many years at just 5.4 meters and had a European caravan style. The Que featured front and rear fiberglass caps, fiberglass sides, modern appointments, and a full bathroom. The new cherry cabinetry introduced in the Que carried over to all 2007 models when they launched two months later.

After a four-year hiatus, Sunline revived the Advancer name for a new handicapped accessible model. While any other Sunline model could be modified for a wheelchair, this model was built specifically for wheelchair use and had a built in wheelchair lift.

On Friday November 10, 2006, Sunline management announced to all employees that the company would be shutting down after 42 years. Many of Sunline's employees stayed to finish building as many trailers as they could with the supplies they had. News spread quickly around the industry, and many dealers acted fast to buy up completed trailers, despite a lack of factory warranty. Chapter 7 bankruptcy was filed for Sunline Coach Company on December 6, 2006, and was approved by the U.S. Bankruptcy Court for the Eastern District of Pennsylvania on December 29, 2006.

Following the closure and bankruptcy, auctioneer Myron Bowling liquidated the company's assets. On April 17, 2007, Myron Bowling held an auction on site. Following the auction and liquidation, the property was sold. Sunline's intellectual assets were listed on eBay for a few months in 2007, shortly after the closure

== Sunline Owners keep the spirit alive ==
In the 1990s, the Sunliners and Sunline Pioneers were born as camping groups of exclusively Sunline owners, primarily in Pennsylvania. These groups were small and mostly dissolved by the 2000s.

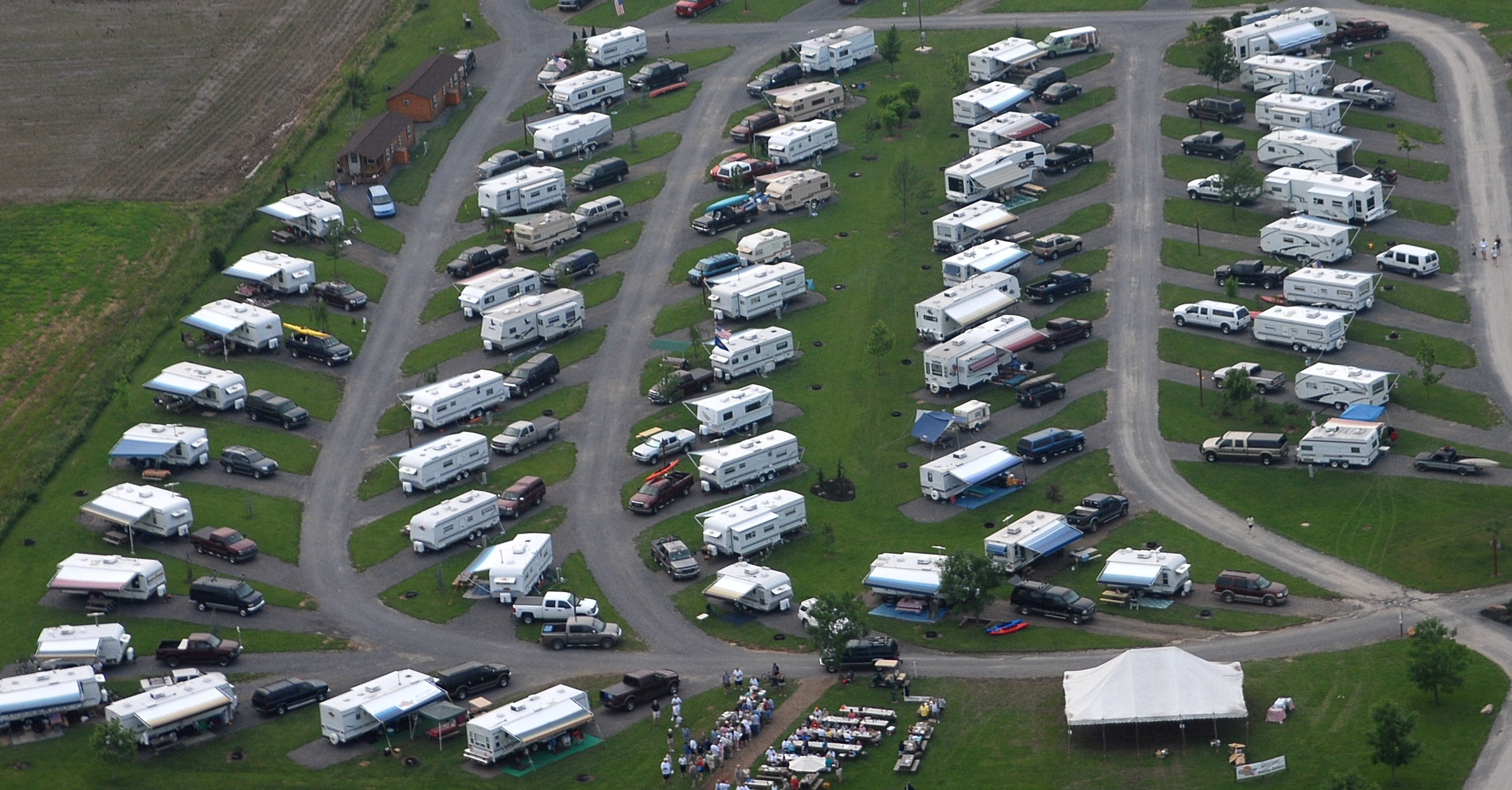
52 Sunlines gathered at Buttonwood Campground in 2009

SunlineClub.com was born August 2, 2006, as a new, free enthusiast site. It was never associated with the company and was slow to grow initially. The site was a very basic forum format, utilizing phpBB code. The site gained significant membership that November when news spread about Sunline's closure. SunlineClub.com was acquired by Social Knowledge LLC in 2010 who continues to own and operate it today. Today, Sunline Club has become a large camping group, with various rallies around the country. An annual large rally is held at Buttonwood Campground in Mexico, Pennsylvania, with a record of 52 Sunlines in attendance in 2009. The website has a huge technical database of Sunline resources and almost 10,000 members.

== Sunlines in the news ==
In 1997, Pennsylvania Cable Network (PCN) did a segment on Sunline as part of their PCN Tours series to feature local businesses around Pennsylvania. The tour was featured on TV, and then available for purchase on VHS or DVD.

On April 30, 2017, a Sunline was featured in the local news when a large tree fell on the trailer at Oma's Family Campground in Colerain Township, killing a 10-year-old girl sleeping inside. The trailer was a 1996 Sunline Solaris T-2652.

On May 21, 2023, a Sunline trailer was a subject in the local news to Brighton, Livingston County, Michigan when police had an hours-long standoff with a suspect barricaded inside of the travel trailer, next to a stolen U-haul truck. A female suspect exited unharmed, leaving a male suspect alone in the trailer. After authorities busted out a window on the trailer, the man was found unresponsive on the bed, dead from suicide. The trailer appears to be a 1993 Sunline Solaris T-2362 or T-2363 with aftermarket galvanized wheels replacing the original white painted.
