= Advance, California =

Unincorporated community in California, United States

- Unincorporated community
- Location within California Location within the United States
- Coordinates: 36°30′57″N 118°54′09″W
- Country: United States
- State: California
- County: Tulare
- Elevation: 1,352 ft (412 m)

Population (2020)
  - Total: 144
- Time zone: UTC-8 (Pacific (PST))
  - Summer (DST): UTC-7 (PDT)
- Area code: 559
- GNIS feature ID: 1657890

Advance is a historical unincorporated community in Tulare County, California, United States. Advance is 5 miles (8.0 km) north of Three Rivers. A post office opened in the community in 1890; it was moved to Kaweah in 1910.

Advance was the site of the Kaweah Cooperative Colony, an experimental socialist community which existed from 1885 to 1891. Members were paid for their labor at a rate of 30 cents an hour, but had to pay hundreds of dollars in dues to live in the colony. The settlers were evicted in 1891 and the Kaweah Cooperative Colony disbanded the following year. A historic marker was erected at the site of Advance in 1948. The Giant Forest Road (Colony Road), the only road into Sequoia National Park until the 1920s, was built by the Kaweah Colony.
