= FWD (club) =

Seasonal outdoor dayclub and nightclub in Cleveland, Ohio

FWD Dayclub + Nightclub

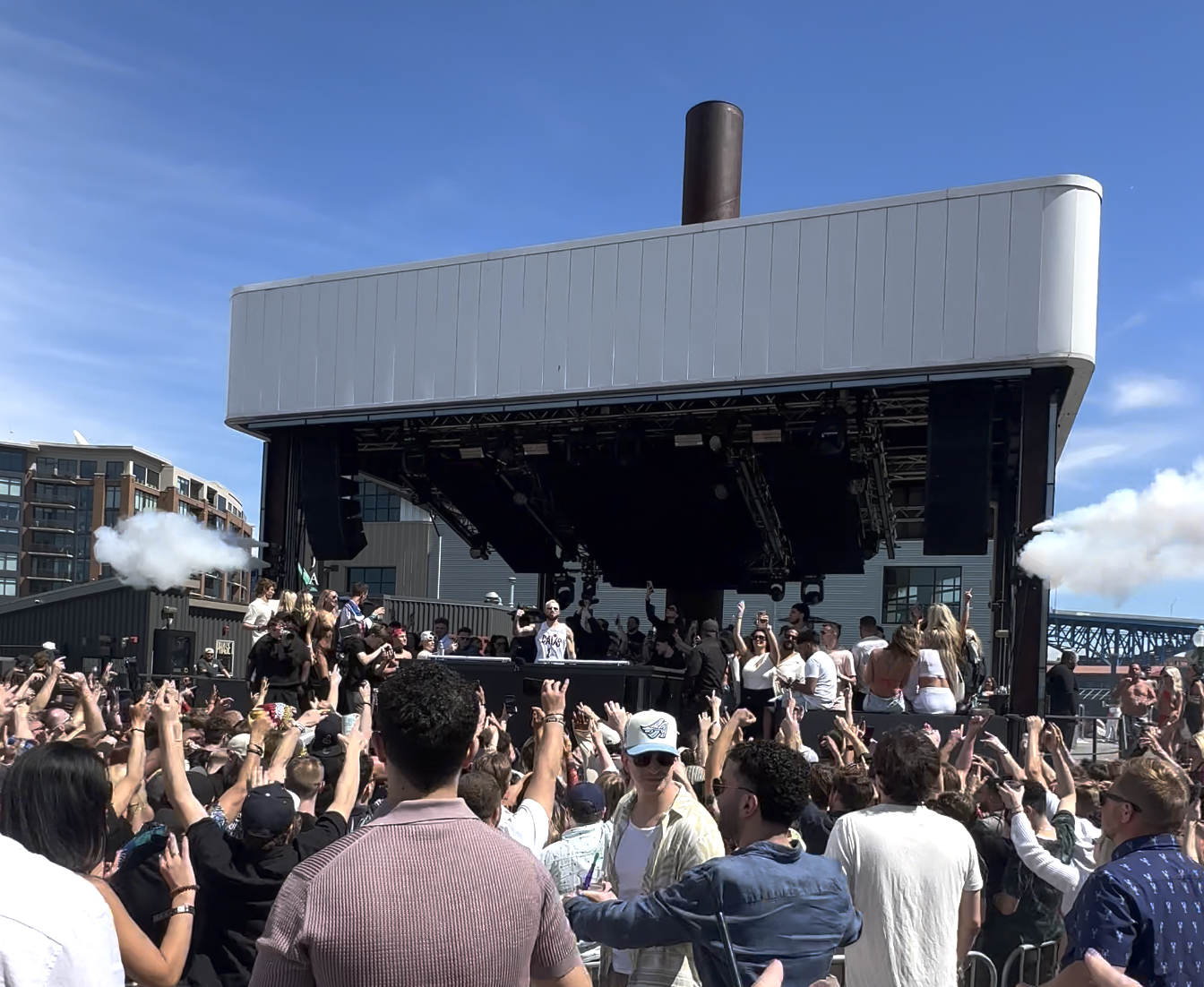
- James Hype performing at FWD in 2025
- Interactive map of FWD Dayclub + Nightclub
- Address: 1176 Front Ave, Cleveland, OH 44113; Cleveland, Ohio, 44113; United States
- Coordinates: 41.49997°N 81.70810°W
- Owner: Ethos Hospitality Group
- Type: Dayclub and Nightclub

Construction
- Opened: 2015

Website
- fwdnightclub.com

FWD Dayclub + Nightclub (pronounced "forward") is a seasonal outdoor nightclub and dayclub located in Cleveland, Ohio, within The Flats. The club was conceived in 2015 by Bobby Rutter and Michael Schwartz, and was first opened by Forward Hospitality Group, a company named from the club. The group sold FWD off in 2025 to Cleveland businessman Bobby George who owns and operates it under his company Ethos Hospitality Group. FWD has been nicknamed "the Ibiza of the Midwest", and according to Schwartz was inspired by nightclubs in Las Vegas.

== History ==
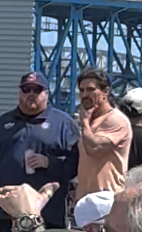
Bobby George (right), at FWD, whose partners acquired the club in 2025.

Cleveland's Flats has been the target of proposals for nightclubs including seasonal ones since 2011 by two property developers, the Wolstein Group and Fairmount Properties. FWD was proposed to be a seasonal entertainment venue designed to evoke Las Vegas or South Beach, situated on the Cuyahoga River. Initially, Rutter proposed cover charges of $10-$20 for most shows prior to opening. In a 2025 interview with Sun Sentinel prior to opening another concept in Florida, Rutter compared FWD to "MTV gave me $5 million to build a nightclub that looks built in a shipping yard". One of Forward Hospitality Group's partners is also former Barstool Sports podcast host Dante Deiana.

FWD first opened on Friday, July 31, 2015, with a grand opening the following Saturday. FWD during its opening also offered private memberships.

FWD and its parent Forward Hospitality Group struggled during the COVID-19 pandemic, where in Ohio, governor Mike DeWine laid out distancing guidelines which Rutter expressed would be incompatible with many venues in the group.

In 2025, FWD was sold by the Forward Hospitality Group to Cleveland businessman Bobby George and his company Ethos Hospitality Group; entities related to George and the Wolstein family also gained control over the land in The Flats. Ethos previously acquired part of The Flats away from the family of Cleveland real estate developer Scott Wolstein, acquiring the land under the Cleveland location of Jimmy Buffett's Margaritaville in 2023. George's acquisition of FWD came after state lawmakers rescinded funds relating to Ethos' proposed entertainment complex in the Flats, with legislators citing George's criminal status in May 2024, which while eventually reduced down to a single felony of attempted strangulation that George pled guilty to in November 2025, initially included allegations of rape and attempted murder.

== Design ==
FWD is located at the tail end of The Flats and right next to an active railway, using recycled 9.5-foot-tall shipping containers for its walls. The stage is covered by a roof which also holds the VIP area, and separately 12 cabanas are located across the club. With four bars, the venue spans 15,000 square feet in total. FWD also added a public pool inspired by Las Vegas dayclubs.

== Reception ==
In its annual awards, EDM.com awarded FWD for the best residency of 2023 with John Summit, and again in 2025 with Timmy Trumpet.

== Notable performers ==
- Dvbbs
- Kaskade
- John Summit
- Lil Jon
- Machine Gun Kelly
- Malaa
- Meduza
- Pauly D
- Sean Kingston
- Timmy Trumpet
