= Dead Ahead =

Dead Ahead may refer to:

- Dead Ahead (comics), a 2008 comic book series drawn by Alex Niño
- Rest Stop (film), a 2006 direct-to-video film also known as Rest Stop: Dead Ahead
- Dead Ahead, a 1996 made-for-TV film starring Stephanie Zimbalist
- Dead Ahead: The Exxon Valdez Disaster, a 1992 made-for-TV film
- Dead Ahead (Wild Horses album), a 2003 rock album
- Dead Ahead, a 2005 rock album by Dead Moon
- Grateful Dead: Dead Ahead, a 1981 rock concert video
