= USS Advance (MSO-510) =

Minesweeper of the United States Navy

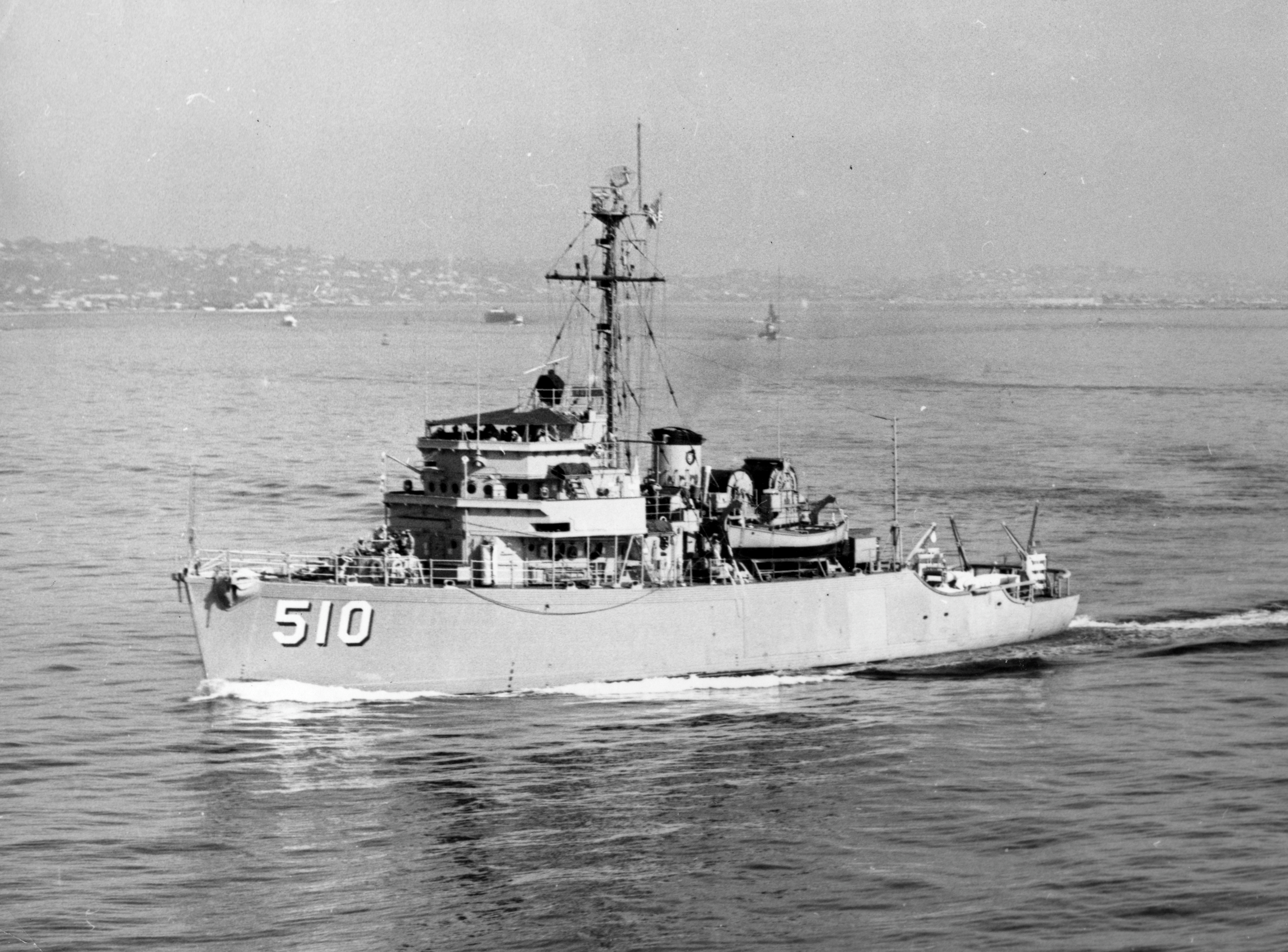

History

United States
- Name: USS Advance (MSO-510)
- Laid down: 28 June 1955
- Launched: 12 July 1956
- Commissioned: 16 June 1958
- Decommissioned: December 1970
- Stricken: 15 May 1976
- Home port: Long Beach, California
- Fate: Sold for scrap 6 January 1977 to Oskco Edwards of Capistrano Beach, CA for $40,010
- Notes: burned to the waterline 23 November 2013

General characteristics
- Class & type: Acme-class minesweeper
- Displacement: 750 long tons (760 t)
- Length: 173 ft (53 m)
- Beam: 36 ft (11 m)
- Draught: 14 ft (4.3 m)
- Installed power: Four 570shp Packard diesel engines, two shafts, two controllable pitch propellers
- Speed: 14 knots
- Complement: 78
- Armament: one 40 mm gun mount, two .50 cal (12.7 mm) machine guns

USS Advance (AM-510/MSO-510) was an Acme-class minesweeper acquired by the U.S. Navy for the task of removing mines that had been placed in the water to prevent the safe passage of ships.

The sixth ship to be named Advance by the Navy, MSO-510 was laid down on 28 June 1955 at Boothbay Harbor, Maine, by Frank L. Sample, Jr., Inc.; launched on 12 July 1956; sponsored by Mrs. Allen H. Sturges; and commissioned on 16 June 1958.

== East Coast operations ==
The minesweeper completed her outfitting in Boothbay Harbor and, after a stop at Boston, Massachusetts, for additional preparations, headed south for Charleston, South Carolina, near the end of the second week in July. She arrived at that port on 15 July and conducted four weeks of shakedown training. On 12 August, the ship began the long passage to the U.S. West Coast and her permanent assignment.

== Assigned to the West Coast ==
She made stops at Key West, Florida, and at Havana, Cuba, before transiting the Panama Canal late in August. She entered port at Long Beach, California, on 7 September. For the remainder of 1958, the minesweeper engaged in various training missions out of Long Beach. The year 1959 began with her carrying out more of the same type of duty, along with various Pacific Mine Force competitions and inspections. On 1 April 1959, Advance entered the Long Beach Naval Shipyard for post-shakedown availability and extensive modernization work to her main propulsion plant.

== First deployment to the Far East ==
The minesweeper resumed local operations in the fall of 1959 and continued to be so engaged until late in the summer of 1960. On 31 August of that year, she stood out of Long Beach for her first deployment to the western Pacific Ocean. She made stops at Pearl Harbor and at Midway Island before arriving in Yokosuka, Japan, on 28 September. For a little more than four months, Advance conducted training operations with other ships of the U.S. 7th Fleet as well as with units of the navies of Taiwan and Korea. She also visited various Korean, Japanese, Taiwanese, and Philippine Islands ports. On 11 February 1961, the ship stood out of Subic Bay in the Philippines in company with the other ships of Mine Division (MinDiv) 92 bound for the United States. After stops at Guam, Midway Island, and Pearl Harbor, she arrived back in Long Beach on 25 March. Early the following month, the vessel entered a civilian shipyard at Long Beach for post-deployment repairs. In May, she resumed operations along the west coast with units of the U.S. 1st Fleet.

== Far East operations ==
Advance continued that employment over the next 14 months. She embarked upon her second deployment to the western Pacific Ocean on 2 July 1962 and arrived at Subic Bay on 13 August. During the following two months, she made goodwill tour stops at various islands in the Philippines. In mid-October, the minesweeper moved to Okinawa where she participated in the U.S. 7th Fleet's Exercise "Lone Eagle." From there, she steamed to Sasebo, Japan, for a series of repairs which included the replacement of her port outboard main engine. On 5 December, the ship stood out of Sasebo bound for Hong Kong in which port she remained for a week before returning to Subic Bay late in December. On 27 December 1962, she began the long voyage back to Long Beach and reentered her home port on 8 February 1963 after stops at Guam, Midway Island, and Pearl Harbor. Post-deployment leave and upkeep followed. On 15 March, she resumed local operations out of Long Beach and devoted the remainder of 1963 and the first nine months of 1964 to type training, inspections, regular overhaul, and competitive exercises.

== Minesweep exercises with the Taiwan Navy ==
On 28 September 1964, the minesweeper sailed from Long Beach on her third assignment to the U.S. 7th Fleet in the western Pacific. En route, she made the usual stop at Pearl Harbor plus one each at Johnston Island, Kwajalein Atoll, Guam, and Okinawa before entering port at Sasebo on 23 November. After a repair period at that Japanese port, the vessel got underway on 7 December for mine exercises in cooperation with the Taiwanese Navy. She carried out that mission in waters near Taiwan between 11 and 17 December and then headed for Hong Kong where her crew celebrated Christmas. Departing Hong Kong on 27 December, she arrived at Subic Bay on the 30th.

== Vietnam operations ==
Advance spent the first five weeks of 1965 in upkeep at Subic Bay and, on 7 February, headed for her first combat tour—in the recently escalated war in South Vietnam. She cruised the coastal waters of South Vietnam for about two weeks with Task Group (TG) 76.5, returning to Subic Bay on 22 February. She remained in Subic Bay for a fortnight and then headed back to Vietnam on 7 March. The minesweeper conducted special operations off the coast of South Vietnam until 9 April and then shaped a course for Australia. She arrived in Brisbane, Australia, on 30 April and spent about a week engaged in the festivities celebrating the Allied victory in the Battle of the Coral Sea in May 1942. During the second week in May, the warship visited Sydney, Australia; then made a four-day stop at Kembla, Australia; and got underway on 19 May to return home. She made stops at Fiji, American Samoa, Johnston Island, and Pearl Harbor before re-entering Long Beach on 26 June.

== Operation Market Time ==
Following post-deployment standdown, Advance cruised the waters of the American Pacific coast until late in August when she began regular overhaul at a civilian shipyard. Although this work ended on 24 November, the ship remained moored at Long Beach for the rest of the year. Refresher and type training occupied her time until mid-May 1966. On 16 May, she departed Long Beach and headed back to the western Pacific. She made stops along the way at Pearl Harbor, Johnston Island, Kwajalein Atoll, and Guam. At the latter island, the minesweeper underwent a 10-day repair period. She arrived in the Far East on 5 July. Eleven days later, she embarked upon her first Vietnam patrol of that deployment. Until mid-August, the minesweeper conducted missions in Operation Market Time, the ongoing patrols to interdict communist waterborne logistics efforts. Her guns were fired in anger for the first time in her career on the second day of the patrol, when a group of three junks refused to heave to when so ordered. Advance and an accompanying swift boat opened fire and promptly destroyed all three. Later in the patrol, the warship encountered a disabled cargo junk and towed it to a friendly village. She concluded the first patrol period of the deployment on 26 August when she entered Sasebo, Japan, for repairs.

== Search and rescue patrols ==
She departed Sasebo on 10 September and, after a diversion to Subic Bay, took up her patrol station on the 24th. She cruised Vietnamese waters for 16 days and then departed the area on 8 October for upkeep at Subic Bay. Twenty days later, she headed back to Vietnam for her third "Market Time" patrol of the deployment. During that tour, she participated in one salvage operation and two search and rescue missions. On 19 November, Advance left Vietnamese waters once more, this time bound for Kaohsiung, Taiwan, for a tender availability alongside USS Isle Royale (AD-29). She departed Taiwan on 11 December for an eight-day visit to Hong Kong before resuming "Market Time" operations late that month. The minesweeper concluded another quiet patrol on 1 February 1967 and set a course for Subic Bay. She completed repairs there on 10 February and set out for home. The warship underwent repairs at Guam between 18 February and 5 March and then resumed her voyage back to the United States. She made stops at Kwajalein, Johnston Island, and Pearl Harbor before arriving back in Long Beach on 5 April 1967.

== West Coast operations ==
After post-deployment leave and upkeep, Advance embarked upon normal west coast operations. These included amphibious exercises, an operational readiness inspection, and type training. In mid-June, she was also called upon to spend two days shadowing a Soviet intelligence-gathering ship disguised as a commercial trawler. Normal operations continued through the summer and into the fall. On 15 November, the ship entered a civilian shipyard in Long Beach for her regular overhaul which lasted through the end of 1967 and the first four months of 1968. On 6 May, she put to sea for post-overhaul shakedown and refresher training. Such employment continued until early in September.

== Return to Vietnam operations ==
On 9 September 1968, Advance stood out of Long Beach bound for the western Pacific once more. After the usual stops at Pearl Harbor, Johnston Island, Kwajalein, and Guam, enduring Typhoon Irma at sea on her way to Yap Island, arriving in Subic Bay in late November. On 25 November, she once again took up duties in Vietnamese waters, this time serving as barrier ship for the familiar "Market Time" patrol. Advance continued to alternate periods on "Market Time" patrol with repair and leave periods in various ports through the first week in March 1969. Later that month, she headed for home.

After about a year of normal operations along the west coast, Advance was deployed to the western Pacific in the spring of 1970 for the fifth and final time of her career. She conducted operations along the Vietnamese coast for two extended periods during the summer of 1970 before returning to the west coast that fall.

== Decommissioning ==
In December 1970, Advance was placed out of commission and was berthed with the Mare Island Group, Pacific Reserve Fleet. Her name was apparently struck from the Navy list between 1 October and 31 December 1976. She was transferred by sale to Mr. Oskco Edwards of Capistrano Beach, California, on 6 January 1977. The ship was later sold several times to private owners and is now docked at a private island near the Riverside Holland Marina in Knightsen, California. Caught fire/set afire 23 November 2013 and burned to the waterline.

== Military awards and honors ==
Advance (MSO-510) earned five battle stars during the Vietnam War. She also was awarded the Vietnam Cross of Gallantry with Palm Leaf (unit commendation) for her work in locating a sunken U.S. drone aircraft off the coast of DaNang.
