= Advance (1903) =

Diesel powered wooden carvel schooner

History
- Name: Advance
- Owner: William Watt
- Port of registry: Sydney
- Ship registration number: 46/1908
- Ship official number: 115210
- Builder: W Brown & Sons Kaipara, New Zealand
- Completed: 1903
- Fate: Wrecked

General characteristics
- Type: Wood carvel Schooner
- Tonnage: 48 GRT; 36 NRT
- Length: 22.82 m (74 ft 10 in)
- Beam: 6.370 m (20 ft 10.8 in)
- Draught: 1.219 m (4 ft 0 in)
- Installed power: Diesel

The Advance was a diesel powered wooden carvel schooner built in 1903 at Kaipara, that was wrecked at Wreck Bay, New South Wales in 1915. The wreck has not been located, but the approximate coordinates are 35.19°S 150.65°E.
