= Advance (1874) =

Composite Schooner

Coordinates: 34.00°S 151.235°E

History

Australia
- Name: Advance
- Owner: Captain Charles Ingstrom
- Port of registry: Sydney
- Ship registration number: 43/1897
- Ship official number: 70205
- Builder: John Thompson Tolaga Bay, Auckland, New Zealand
- Completed: 1874
- Fate: Wrecked 12 June 1902

General characteristics
- Type: Composite schooner
- Tonnage: 59 GRT, 51 NRT
- Length: 21.94 m
- Beam: 5.943 m
- Depth: 1.950 m
- Crew: 4

The Advance was a composite schooner built in 1874 at Auckland, New Zealand, that was wrecked when she drifted onto rocks at Henrys Head, Botany Bay, New South Wales, Australia, on 12 June 1902, whilst carrying ballast between Wollongong and Newcastle, New South Wales.

== Ship description and construction ==
During the 1870s, the shipbuilding trade in and around Auckland was rapidly expanding, with shipbuilding occurring in numerous little bays and harbours due to the abundant timber suitable for shipbuilding purposes. The Advance, a wooden schooner of 51 tons, was built in Tolaga Bay in 1874. She made her maiden trading voyage in mid-January 1875 from Port of Auckland to Gisborne carrying passengers, 20 tons of coal, lumber, flour and other general cargo.

== Service history ==
The Advance was a regular trader between East Coast ports Auckland, Wellington, and Lyttelton, under the ownership of Mr. John Trimmer. The vessel was then purchased by Messrs Keans and Company and was for some years commanded by Captain Kennedy.

While she operated in Australia, the Advance became a well-known schooner, employed in the coastal coal trade and for a number of years trading between Sydney and the Northern and Southern collieries.

=== The Advance in New Zealand ===
In early 1879, one of the crews of the Advance was found in court to have disobeyed the lawful commands of the master and was sentenced to 24 hours imprisonment.

In May 1880, while traveling from the Thames to Kaiapoi with 39,500 feet of timber, the Advance drifted onto the North Spit at Christchurch. She lost her rudder and part of her false keel, but was otherwise undamaged, and was removed from the bar without difficulty.

During April 1881, under the command of John William Nicholson, the Advance got away from a near miss when leaving the Grey River at Greymouth under tow of the steam tug Dispatch. The tow ropes were lost and the vessel drifted into the breakwater, moving too fast for the anchor to have held her. The sails were raised, but the wind had died away, and the crew lost control of the vessel. The Dispatch, however, managed to take the Advance in tow once again and left her on the flat opposite the town. Three feet of water had washed aboard, but no major damage was sustained.

=== The Advance in Australia ===
Charles John Ingstrom, owner and mate of the Advance, owned the vessel from 7 July 1896. The vessel's Sydney registration number shows that the vessel entered registration in Australia in 1897.

==== Lady Robinsons Beach stranding ====
On 26 July 1897, the Advance was anchored in Botany Bay at the entrance to Cooks River, when a fierce squall drove her onto Lady Robinsons Beach. An inquiry into the stranding found that the port chain had parted and the other anchor had dragged. The wreck was sold by the insurance companies and repurchased by the former owner. The vessel was described to have been carried away up on the beach and left there high and dry by the receding tide. She was found so far away from water that it would be necessary to dig a channel especially for her to be launched by means of towing power.

==== Rescue of Captain Gallant from the Minora ====
In January 1898, the Advance was involved in the rescue of the Captain of the Minora from a 24-hour lost-at-sea ordeal, where the Captain had seen his crew perish around him while vessels came close but failed to lend assistance.

The Minora, a brig of 219 tons register, was about 10 or 12 miles (19 km) off the coast, abreast of Broken Bay, when she shipped two heavy seas, and rapidly filled. Her bows sank first, and within the space of five minutes she had completely disappeared from view. One or two of the crew jumped overboard, but the remainder went down with the vessel, and managed to keep afloat for some hours as portions of wreckage came to the surface. Prior to leaving the vessel, the cook, who was among the lost, placed a lifebuoy round Captain Gallant and pulled him into the sea where both men seized a floating plank.

During the course of the night a steamer was sighted from the northward and came within hailing distance of the shipwrecked crew. At this time all hands were floating in the vicinity of the spot where the brig foundered. Their voices were evidently heard on board, as Captain Gallant was able to converse with the man on the forecastle head. The query came from the steamer, "Are you in a boat?" Captain Gallant replied, "No send us your boat, we are on planking". A few moments afterwards the steamer went astern and left the shipwrecked men to perish. During the day three other steamers were sighted, all southbound. The first was the South Australian, and the second was one of the Hawkesbury river boats. Both vessels, however, were too far out to hear voices. A few hours afterwards the City of Grafton passed within 50 yards of Captain Gallant and the cook, but although renewed efforts were made by the now exhausted men to attract attention, the vessel passed by without noticing them.

By the time the red light of the Advance came into sight, Captain Gallant was the only man left alive. The vessel came within quarter of a mile of him, and he made one more desperate effort to attract attention. In his own words he shouted and screeched without stopping, and within 20 minutes was picked up in an almost unconscious condition by the ship's boat. All his strength had vanished and the boat containing him was hauled up on board the schooner, and he was lifted into the captain's cabin where spirits were administered and his limbs were rubbed to restore the circulation of the blood. Spirits in very small quantities were given to him and the terrible thirst from which he was suffering was gradually allayed. Captain Gallant subsequently managed to obtain a few hours sleep, and upon awakening, although extremely weak from exhaustion and exposure, was able to relate the privations through which he had passed.

The Shipwreck Relief Society gave Captain E. Carlberg, of the Advance, for the prompt and humane action of himself and the schooner's crew, a reward of a pair of binoculars, suitably inscribed, the sum of £3 sterling paid to each member of the crew, and a certificate from the society.

Captain Neate, of the steamer Tangier, was identified as one of those who had refused to rescue the drowning men, and was publicly vilified for his "great indifference".

== Wreck ==
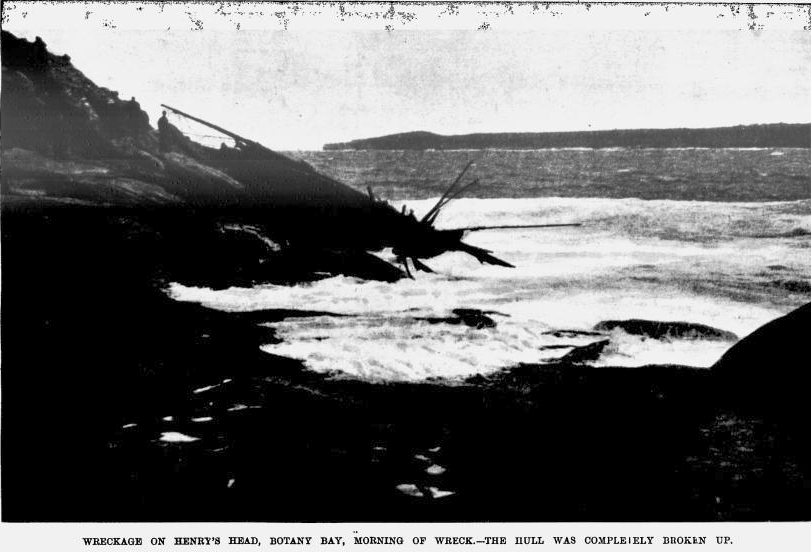
The main wreckage of the schooner Advance (1874) ashore in Botany Bay

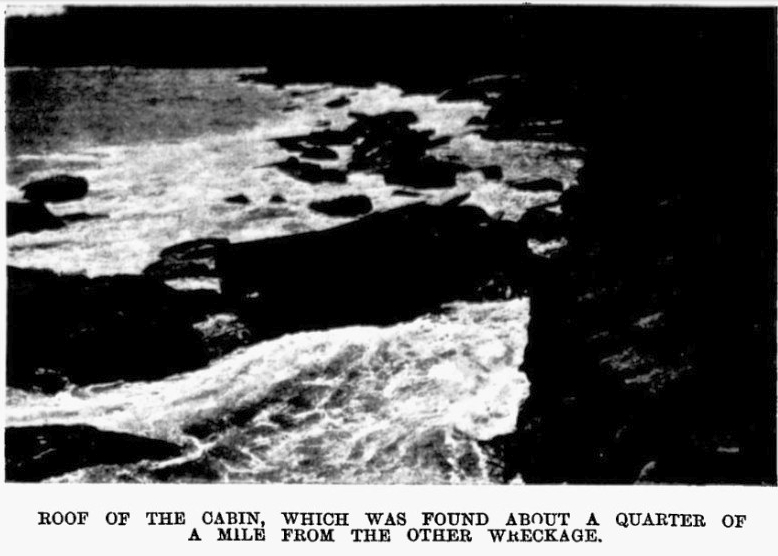
Cabin Wreckage of the schooner Advance (1874) ashore in Botany Bay

Having discharged a cargo of coal from Wollongong at Swinburne's wharf at Botany, the Advance embarked on her final voyage at about 1am, on 12 June 1902. She was in ballast, bound for Newcastle to load coal for the Government dredge Ulysses, then lying at Shea's Creek.

At 3am, the schooner, manned by a crew of four, ran into heavy seas off Henry's Head. The crew were attempting to wear the ship around when she was struck by a powerful wave and flung against the rocks. Almost immediately the receding waves sucked her back, only to send her on the rocks again. The mate, Carlson, called out that there was no use trying to launch the lifeboat, and that their only chance was to make for the rocks. Carlson later reported that the captain, Ingstrom, appeared to be confused, and may have been injured by the main boom, which was "flying about in all directions". The other three crewmembers - Carlson, Holm, and the ship's cook - reached the shore safely, although not without injury. They lit a fire and took shelter under a rock until morning.

When morning came, the body of Captain Ingstrom was discovered floating in the water below, with a huge gash across his forehead. A coastguard at nearby La Perouse, who had seen their fire during the night, picked up the wounded men and took them to Little Bay Hospital, and also informed the police of Ingstrom's death. Gustavo Ingstrom, a seaman who resided at Balmain, was called upon to identify the remains of his brother.

Captain Ingstrom was interred on the following Saturday, 14 June, at the Rookwood Necropolis. The body was taken from the South Morgue to the funeral train, with a few old friends of the deceased following it to its last resting-place and the remains were interred in the Church of England section of the Necropolis.

The Advance, when she sank was valued at about £300 and was uninsured.

== Wreck site and wreckage ==
"Henry Head, where the Advance struck, is a bold headland, distant about half a mile from Cape Banks, which forms the northern entrance to Botany Bay. The cliffs above are high and overhanging, while at the foot are a number of huge boulders lying about in all sorts of fantastic positions." Coincidentally, this small headland had claimed another vessel called the Advance just 18 years prior, in similar circumstances.

The day after the accident, all that could be seen of the Advance was "one of the masts, some planking, and a confused heap of rigging, sails, and tackle". A few scraps of wreckage and part of the deckhouse were strewn across a nearby beach.
