= Forward =

Forward is a relative direction, the opposite of backward.

Forward may also refer to:

== People ==
- Forward (surname)

== Sports ==
- Forward (association football)
- Forward (basketball), including:
  - Point forward
  - Power forward
  - Small forward
- Forward (ice hockey)
  - Power forward (ice hockey)
- In rugby football:
  - Forwards (rugby league), in rugby league football
  - Forwards (rugby union), in rugby union football
- Forward Sports, a Pakistan sportswear brand
- BK Forward, a Swedish club for association football and bandy

== Politics ==
- Avante (political party) (Portuguese for forward), a political party in Brazil
- Endavant (Catalan for forward), a socialist pro-independence organization in Catalonia
- Forward (Belgium), a political party in Belgium
- Forward (Bosnia and Herzegovina), a political party in Bosnia and Herzegovina
- Forward (Denmark), a political party in Denmark
- Forward (Greenland), a political party in Greenland
- Forward Party (United States), a centrist American political party
- Kadima (Hebrew for forward), a political party in Israel
- La République En Marche! (sometimes translated as Forward!), a political party in France
- Socialist League Vpered ("Forward"), a political party in Russia

== Geography ==
=== Canada ===
- Forward, Saskatchewan

=== United States ===
- Forward, Wisconsin
- Forward Township, Allegheny County, Pennsylvania
- Forward Township, Butler County, Pennsylvania

== Books and publications ==
- Forward!, a 1985 collection of short stories by Gordon R. Dickson
- Forward: Stories of Tomorrow, a 2019 collection of science fiction short stories by various authors
- Forward Prizes for Poetry
- The Forward (Yiddish: פֿאָרווערטס), a Jewish-American, Yiddish/English newspaper from New York
- Forward (Scottish newspaper), socialist weekly founded in 1906
- Forward (Sri Lanka), a defunct English-language Communist Party weekly newspaper
- Forward (Syrian magazine), an English-language newsmagazine 2009–2011
- Avante! ("Forward!"), a publication of the Portuguese Communist Party
- Avanti! (newspaper) ("Forward!"), a publication of the Italian Socialist Party
- Eteenpäin ("Forward"), a Communist Party USA Finnish-language newspaper in the United States
- Új Előre ("New Forward"), a Communist Hungarian-language newspaper in the United States
- Vorwärts ("Forward"), a publication of the Social Democratic Party of Germany
- Vorwärts! ("Forward!"), a radical German-language paper published in Paris in 1844, covering art and culture
- Vorwärts (Czechoslovak newspaper) ("Forward!"), a newspaper of the Communist Party of Czechoslovakia

== Mottos and slogans ==
- "Forward", Wisconsin state motto
- "Forward", motto of the English city of Birmingham
- "Forward", Barack Obama 2012 presidential campaign slogan

== Music ==
- Forward (The Abyssinians album), 1982
- Forward (Ayla Brown album) or the title song, 2006
- Forward (Turn album) or the title song, 2003
- Forward (Brand New Heavies album), 2013
- Forward (Flame album), 2015
- Forward (Jordan Ward album), 2023
- Forward (Hoobastank album), 2000
- "Naprej, zastava slave" ("Forward, the Flag of Glory"), the former Slovene anthem, originally titled "Naprej" (Forward!)
- "Forward" (song), by Beyoncé from Lemonade, 2016
- "Forward", a song by Band-Maid from Maid in Japan

== Other uses ==
- Email forwarding, a mechanism by which a mail server sends the emails of one of its users to another address.
- Forward (aircraft), front part of an aircraft, spacecraft, or ship
- Forward declaration in computer programming, is a partial declaration before it is completely defined
- Forward converter, electronic circuit
- Forward contract, a financial agreement to buy or sell an asset at a pre-agreed future point
- Isuzu Forward, a line of medium-duty trucks
- Landwind Forward, a subcompact sedan
- Foundation for Women's Health, Research and Development, a British charity
- Forward, a sculpture by Raymond Mason, located in Birmingham before being destroyed by arson
- Forward, a statue by Jean Miner Coburn in Madison, Wisconsin

== See also ==
- FWD
- Forwarding (disambiguation)
- Foreword (disambiguation)
