= Advance (1872) =

Wooden topsail schooner

History
- Name: Advance
- Owner: David Cairncross & William Rooke
- Port of registry: Sydney
- Ship registration number: 21/1872
- Ship official number: 64386
- Builder: Thomas Davis Terrigal, New South Wales, AUSTRALIA
- Completed: 1872
- Fate: Wrecked 11 February 1884

General characteristics
- Type: Wood Top sail schooner
- Tonnage: 38 GRT
- Displacement: 37 NRT
- Length: 19.93 m (65 ft 5 in)
- Beam: 5.181 m (17 ft 0 in)
- Draught: 1.706 m (5 ft 7.2 in)
- Installed power: NA
- Ship primary use: Transport
- Ship industry: cargo - coastal
- Ship passenger capacity: 0
- Crew: 4

The Advance was a wooden topsail schooner built in 1872 at Terrigal, that was wrecked when it missed stays whilst carrying ballast (vessel was used in the lime trade) between Botany Bay and Port Stephens under the command of Captain J. Delaney and was lost at Henry Head Bight, Botany Bay, New South Wales on 11 February 1884

== Ship description and construction ==
The Advance was a wooden vessel

Length, 63 feet 4 inches (19.30 m)
Breadth, 17 feet 0 inches (5.18 m)
Depth, 5 feet 6 inches (1.68 m)

She was rigged as a fore and aft schooner, built by Mr Thomas Davis at his yard at Terrigal in 1872.

== Ship service history ==
The Advance was originally employed between the Tweed River and Sydney but when she was purchased by Messrs, David Cairncross and William Rooke, she was placed in the trade between Port Stephens and Botany Bay carrying shells for lime burning purposes in which she remained till she has wrecked.

In July 1877 one of the crewman of the Advance died on board the vessel.

The cause of the death of Alexander M'Lean, a seaman of the schooner Advance, on board that vessel. John Smith, master of the schooner, deposed that she lay at the Victoria Wharf, Darling Harbour. The deceased was about 55 years of age, a native of Scotland, and believed unmarried, he had been employed on board the Advance for about eight months. John Smith saw him alive about a quarter to 4 o'clock on Saturday afternoon, the crew of the schooner consisted of about four men in all and she had been recently infested with rats, Smith adopted the following plan to get rid of them on the afternoon of Saturday, John Smith lit a fire in the hold, and threw on it charcoal and sulphur, and battened down the hatches with the view of preventing the escape of fumes, and then directed the crew to go on shore and not to come onboard till between 10 and 11 o'clock on Sunday forenoon, when they were to open the hatches. John Smith did not give any special caution about not going down after taking off the hatches; there might have been about three parts of a bucket of charcoal and a quarter of a pound of sulphur; on Sunday afternoon be heard that M'Lean was lying dead on board the schooner.

Jeremiah O'Connell, Cook on board the schooner, deposed that he last saw deceased alive about 4 o'clock on Saturday afternoon at the Victoria Wharf, he was then sober. O'Connell left the Advance about 6 o'clock in company with the mate, and returned about half past 12 on Sunday afternoon alone. He went forward and saw that the scuttle leading to the forecastle, and which was closed when he left, was open; the other hatches were still closed; he looked into the forecastle and saw the deceased sitting on a seat with his body bent forward and his head resting on the opposite seat there was a smell of charcoal coming up out of the scuttle, he thought deceased was drunk, he spoke to him, but got not reply he shook him, but could not awake him, and found that he was dead.

== Wreck ==
The particulars of the wreck on 11 February 1884 are related by one of the crew:

The Advance in ballast got underway for Port Stephens at about 7 o'clock yesterday (Monday) morning, from the Government wharf, Botany Bay there was a light breeze from the SE at the time, but the weather was overcast, and the wind gradually freshened till, about three quarters of an hour afterwards, it was blowing a strong gale. We attempted to beat out, and made one board across from the south side of the bay, near Captain Cook's monument towards La Perouse As we proceeded it was thought that she would be able to get right out, but when nearing La Perouse the wind headed us veering more to the eastward, and we had to go around in an attempting, to do so the vessel missed stays. We filled on her, as there was no room to wear we made another attempt to stay her She would not stay, however, and the anchor was accordingly let go, which brought her up A kedge was then run out to try and heave her off and when we got to work the vessel was gradually being dragged off when the line unfortunately gave way. All this time the schooner was hanging by the anchor, with her stern just clear of the rocks, and the surf was beginning to break in heavily. Just after the kedge line parted, the pawls of the windlass gave way, and then, nothing holding her she headed right round for the rocks, upon which she was dashed very shortly afterwards We had just enough time to snatch up some of our clothes, get into the boat, which was alongside and pull away. We pulled out Into the bay, and the schooner Harold bound from Wollongong to the waterworks with a cargo of coal coming up at the time we got on board of her and were all landed safely at the Waterworks, whence we came on to Sydney

In the afternoon all that could be seen of the Advance was about 12 feet of her waist.

After investigation by the Marine Board of the master of the Advance, J. E. Delany, it was found that there was nothing in the evidence upon which the Marine Board could find a charge of default and they considered that the schooner was lost in consequence of her missing stays, and parting her anchor.

== Wreck site and wreckage ==
From contemporary newspaper reports the location of the wreck was described as:

The scene of the wreck is called Henry Head Bight where several other vessels have come to grief, notably the Sea Breeze the spot where she went ashore being not more 10 in 20 yards from that where the Advance met her fate. It is middle of the North Head of Botany Bay, and about half a mile from La Perouse The surf breaks in with great violence during SE gales into the bight and as the water is full of jagged rocks for some. distance from the base of the almost perpendicular cliffs, which rise to some height, it can well be Imagined that the crew of a vessel going ashore here in very heavy weather would have but little chance of saving their lives

The location of the shipwreck is approximately 33.99919°S 151.2390°E, but the wreck has not been discovered.

== See also ==
- Advance (1874), a ship of the same name lost at the same headland
