= Soviet hospital ship Armenia =

Soviet military transport ship (in service from 1928 to 1941)

Coordinates: 44°15′N 34°17′E

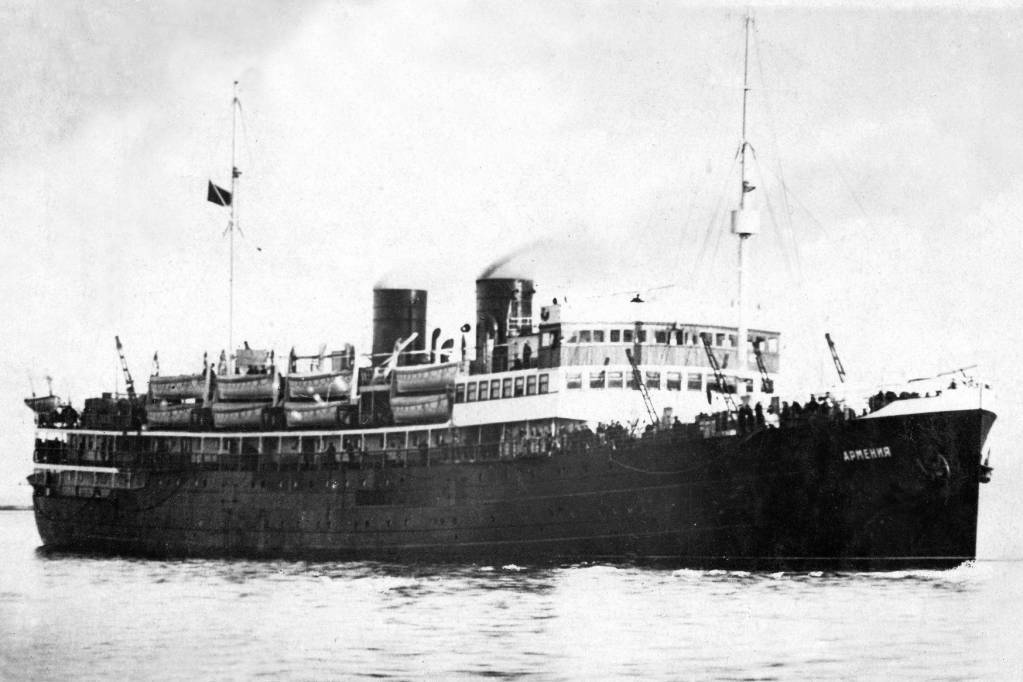
- Armenia, before 1941

History

Soviet Union
- Name: Armenia
- Namesake: Armenia
- Builder: Baltic Shipyard, Leningrad
- Commissioned: 1928
- Out of service: sunk 7 November 1941
- Fate: Sunk by He 111 torpedo bombers

General characteristics
- Class & type: Krim-class cargo liner
- Type: transport/hospital ship
- Tonnage: 4,727 GRT
- Length: 112 m (367 ft)
- Beam: 15.5 m (51 ft)
- Draught: 5.5 m (18 ft 1 in)
- Installed power: Russkiy Dizel 2 × 1472
- Propulsion: twin shaft, 105rpm
- Speed: 13 knots (24 km/h; 15 mph)

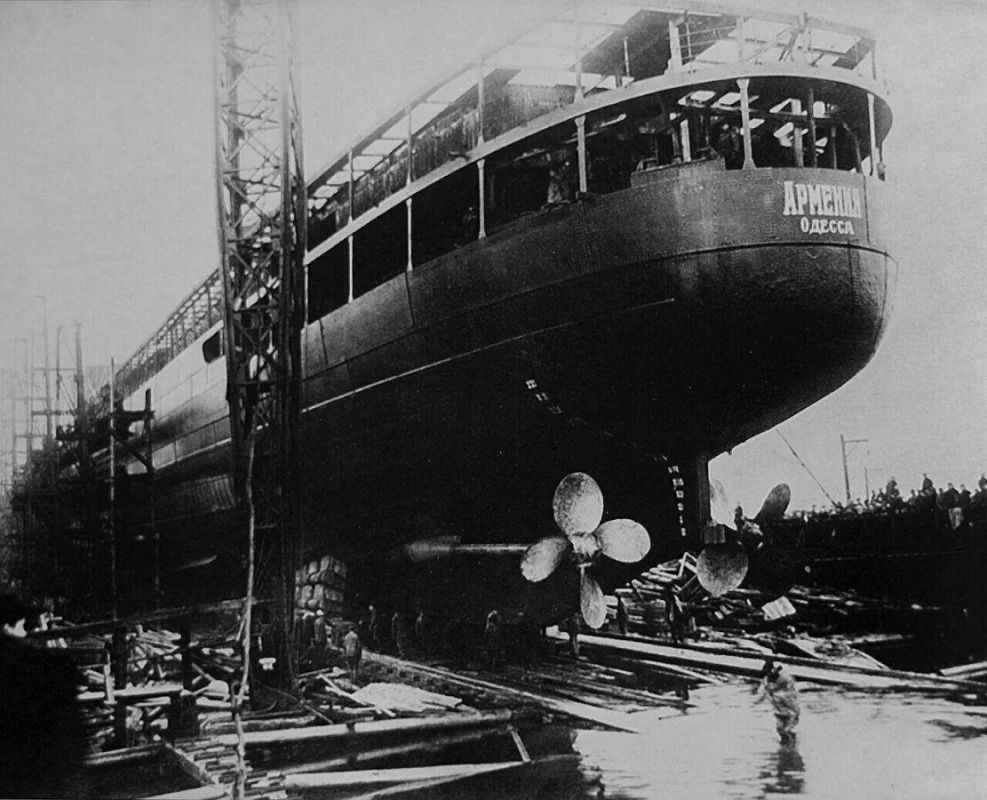
Armenia under construction, Leningrad, 1928

The Soviet hospital ship Armenia (Russian: теплоход «Армения», romanized: teplokhod "Armeniya") was a transport ship operated by the Soviet Union during World War II to carry both wounded soldiers and military cargo. It had originally been built as a passenger ship for operations on the Black Sea.

Armenia was sunk on 7 November 1941 by German aircraft while evacuating civilians and wounded soldiers from Crimea. It has been estimated that approximately 5,000 to 7,000 people were killed during the sinking, making it one of the deadliest maritime disasters in history. There were only eight survivors.

== Career ==
Armenia, built in 1928 at Baltic Shipyards in Leningrad (now St. Petersburg), was one of four Adzharistan-class passenger liners specifically designed for use on the Black Sea. They were the first passenger ships to be built in the newly formed Soviet Union. Armenia was a mid-sized vessel capable of carrying 1,000 tons of cargo as well as about 550 passengers in first-, second-, and third-class accommodations. On short trips it could carry 400–500 more on deck. Her draft of 5.5 meters allowed access to the shallow-water ports of the Crimean Peninsula. Throughout the 1930s she and her sister ships – Gruzia, Adzharistan, Abkhazia, Krim and Ukraina – reliably ferried passengers, mail, and cargo between Black Sea ports such as Odessa, Mariupol, Sevastopol, Yalta, and Batum.

Following the invasion of the Soviet Union by German forces on 22 June 1941, Armenia was requisitioned by the Soviet Navy for use as a transport and hospital ship. By late October 1941 the German Wehrmacht's 11th Army, under General Erich von Manstein, had cut off the Crimean Peninsula, laying siege to Sevastopol. For the Soviets, the only way in or out of the beleaguered city was by sea. In early November Armenia, painted with the large red crosses of a hospital ship, was tasked with removing wounded Russian soldiers, medical personnel, and civilians from Sevastopol.

== Sinking ==
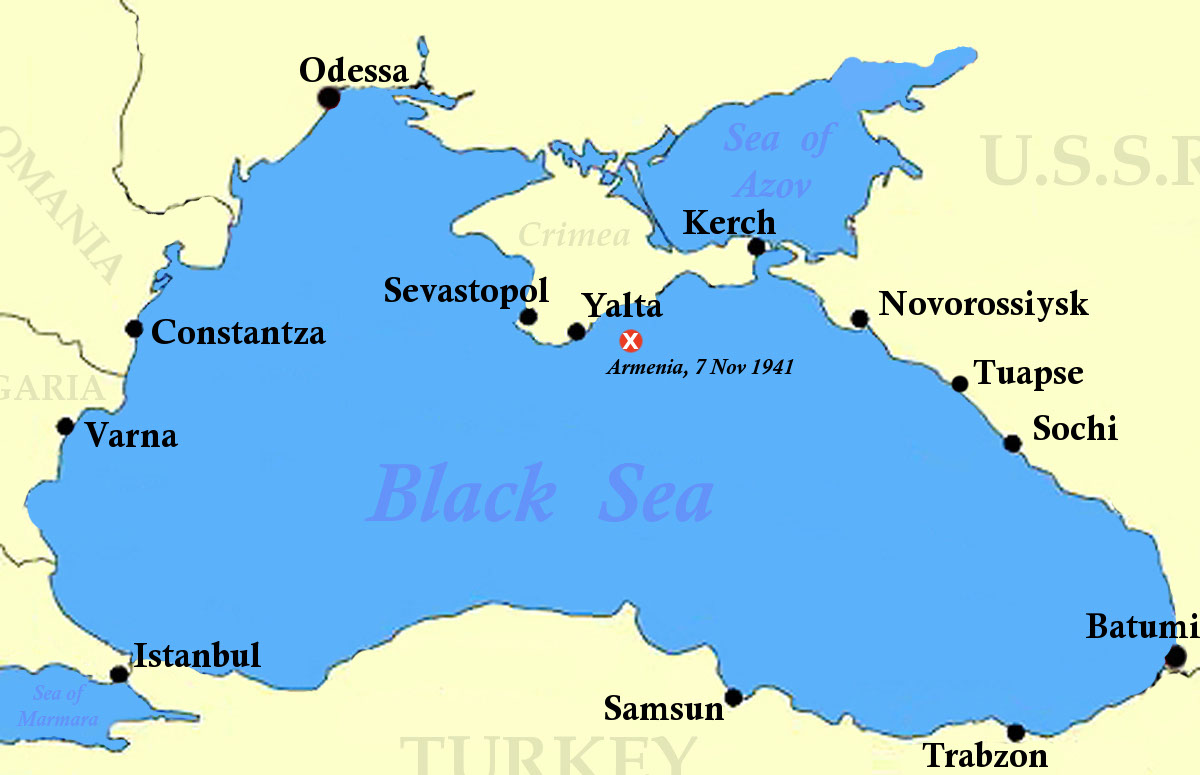
Approximate site of sinking, MV Armenia

On the night of 6/7 November 1941 Armenia took on thousands of passengers at Sevastopol, amid scenes of chaos. Although the city would end up withstanding the German siege for nine months before falling, at the time enemy seizure appeared imminent. Entire Soviet hospital staffs and civilian officials and their families were taken aboard alongside the thousands of wounded, bound for the town of Tuapse, 400 kilometres (250 mi) away on the northeastern shore of the Black Sea. After leaving port in the early morning hours of the 7th, Armenia's captain, Vladimir Plaushevsky, received orders to put in at Yalta, a few kilometres east of Sevastopol, where the already overloaded ship was to pick up yet more passengers. Here, no attempt was made at registering the embarkees; wounded soldiers and civilians were simply crammed onto the decks. Plaushevsky was eager to get underway while darkness still provided some protection, but was ordered to wait for escorts to arrive. At 07:00 Armenia finally departed Yalta, accompanied by two armed boats and two fighter planes.

The Germans and their Romanian and Italian allies had only a few surface vessels on the Black Sea; as such, it remained essentially under Soviet control throughout the Second World War. However, in the earlier part of the war the Axis had complete air superiority. Over a hundred Soviet merchant ships were sunk, as were dozens of naval vessels. Only the most heavily armed and escorted ships could travel in daylight with reasonable hope of safety; ships caught alone or in port in the western part of the Black Sea were very likely to be attacked.

Armenia's status as a hospital ship was jeopardized. Though her sides and top were painted with large red cross symbols, she had light anti-aircraft armament, had previously transported troops and military stores, and, on the morning of 7 November, was traveling with military escort, inadequate though it was.

At 11:30, about 40 km (25 mi) from Yalta, Armenia was attacked by a Heinkel He 111 medium bomber of 1.Staffel (Lufttorpedo)/KG 28, under the command of Ernst-August Roth, which dropped two torpedoes. One torpedo missed; the other scored a direct hit. The ship broke in two and sank within four minutes. Only eight people were rescued.

Even by the lowest estimate of about 5,000 dead, the sinking of Armenia remains the deadliest maritime disaster in Russian and Soviet history. In terms of loss of life in the sinking of a single ship, it is often listed as third worst in world history, after the sinking of the Wilhelm Gustloff and the Goya, German naval ships transporting military personnel and civilian refugees, which were torpedoed by Soviet submarines in the Baltic Sea in 1945.

In 2014, an Australian company GeoResonance claimed to have located the hulk of Armenia in 2005 at a depth of 520m, using an undisclosed remote sensing technique. However this claim has not been substantiated. All four of the Armenia's sister ships were sunk in the war.

In 2020 the Russian Geographical Society claimed to have located the hulk of Armenia.

== Bibliography ==
- Bollinger, Martin J. (2012). From the Revolution to the Cold War: A History of the Soviet Merchant Fleet from 1917 to 1950. Windsor, UK: World Ship Society. ISBN 978-0-9560769-4-6.
- Budzbon, Przemysław; Radziemski, Jan & Twardowski, Marek (2022). Warships of the Soviet Fleets 1939–1945. Vol. III: Naval Auxiliaries. Barnsley, UK: Seaforth Publishing. ISBN 978-1-3990-2281-1.
