= June 1942 =

Month of 1942

<<	June 1942					>>
Su	Mo	Tu	We	Th	Fr	Sa
	1	2	3	4	5	6
7	8	9	10	11	12	13
14	15	16	17	18	19	20
21	22	23	24	25	26	27
28	29	30

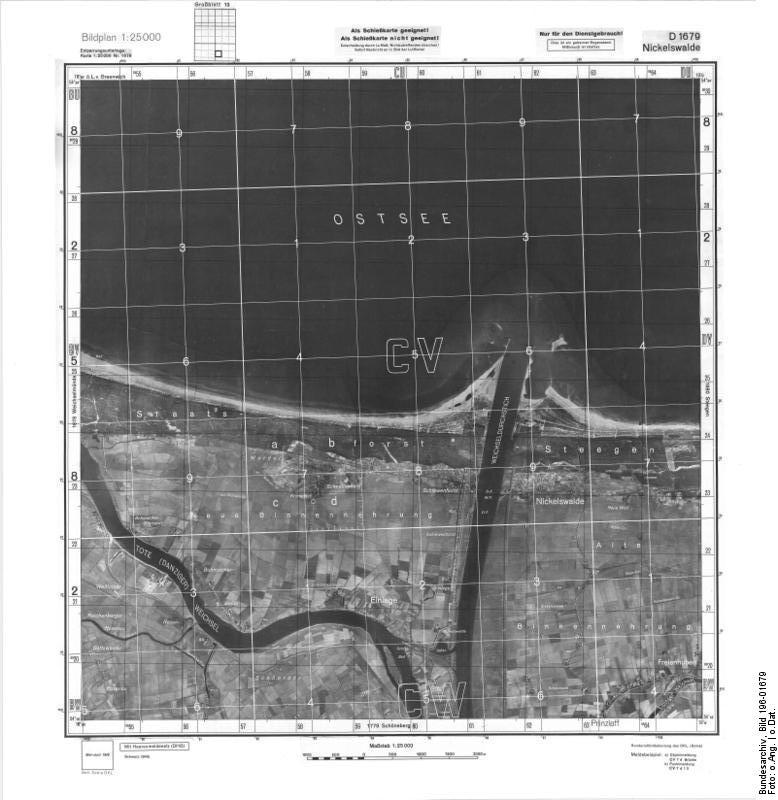
Nickelswalde / Westpreußen, June 1942

The following events occurred in June 1942:

== June 1, 1942 (Monday) ==
- Adolf Hitler visited Army Group South's headquarters at Poltava to confirm plans for the upcoming summer offensive.
- Hermann Hoth assumed command of the German 4th Panzer Army while Richard Ruoff took command of the 17th Army.
- The Australian depot ship Kuttabul was torpedoed and sunk by the Japanese submarine M-24 during the attack on Sydney Harbour.
- The Grand Coulee Dam opened on the Columbia River.
- Companhia Vale do Rio Doce, as predecessor of metals and mining manufacturing brand, Vale was founded in Brazil.

== June 2, 1942 (Tuesday) ==
- During the Siege of Sevastopol, the German 11th Army began a massive five-day artillery barrage on the fortress city using 620 guns including the enormous 800mm Schwerer Gustav "Dora" gun.
- German submarine U-652 was depth charged and damaged in the Gulf of Sollum by Fairey Swordfish aircraft and had to be scuttled.
- Born:
  - Eduard Malofeyev, footballer and coach, in Kolomna, USSR;
- Died: Bunny Berigan, 33, American jazz trumpeter and bandleader (hemorrhage)

== June 3, 1942 (Wednesday) ==
- The Battle of Midway began. The Japanese sought to deliver another crushing blow to the U.S. Navy to ensure Japanese dominance in the Pacific, but American codebreakers had uncovered the time and place of the Japanese attack in advance, enabling the U.S. Navy to prepare its own ambush.
- The Battle of Dutch Harbor began at Dutch Harbor Naval Operating Base and Fort Mears at Dutch Harbor on Amaknak Island, Alaska. The American passenger ship Northwestern was bombed and sunk.
- The British government announced that it would be taking over the country's coal mines and milk industry.
- The Australian ore carrier Iron Chieftain was torpedoed and sunk in the Tasman Sea by the Japanese submarine I-24.
- German submarines U-413 and U-521 were commissioned.
- British Commandos executed Operation Bristle, an overnight raid on a German radar site at Plage-Ste-Cecile, France.
- The stage musical By Jupiter by Lorenz Hart and Richard Rodgers and starring Ray Bolger premiered at the Shubert Theatre on Broadway.
- Born: Curtis Mayfield, soul, R&B and funk singer, songwriter, guitarist and record producer, in Chicago, Illinois (d. 1999)

== June 4, 1942 (Thursday) ==
- The Japanese aircraft carriers Akagi, Kaga and Sōryū were crippled in the Battle of Midway and scuttled.
- The Battle of Dutch Harbor ended in Japanese tactical victory.
- The Hitler and Mannerheim recording is made when Hitler paid a secret visit to Marshal Mannerheim, ostensibly to congratulate him on his 75th birthday. The recording is the only existing one of Hitler speaking in an ordinary tone of voice.
- The Australian ore carrier Iron Crown was torpedoed and sunk in Bass Strait by the Japanese submarine I-27.
- German submarine U-625 was commissioned.
- The wartime romantic drama film Mrs. Miniver starring Greer Garson and Walter Pidgeon was released.
- Died:
  - Reinhard Heydrich, 38, German SS-Obergruppenführer (died of wounds sustained in May 27 assassination attempt);
- Died: (in the Battle of Midway)
  - Robert Boyd Brazier, 25, American aviation radioman (killed in the Battle of Midway);
  - Delbert W. Halsey, 22, American naval officer (killed in the Battle of Midway);
  - Lofton R. Henderson, 39, American marine aviator (killed in the Battle of Midway);
  - Severin Louis Rombach, 27, American naval aviator (killed in the Battle of Midway);
  - Lloyd Thomas, 30, American aviator (killed in the Battle of Midway);
  - Albert William Tweedy, Jr., 22, American Marine Corps aviator (killed in the Battle of Midway);
  - John C. Waldron, 41, American aviator (killed in the Battle of Midway)

== June 5, 1942 (Friday) ==
- Japanese aircraft carrier Hiryū was crippled by American dive bombers on 4th June and scuttled on 5th June.
- Japanese destroyer Tanikaze dodges bombs from 66 American aircraft during the Battle of Midway.
- The United States declared war on the Axis satellite states of Bulgaria, Hungary and Romania.
- During the Battle of Gazala the British Eighth Army began Operation Aberdeen, an attempt to encircle Erwin Rommel's forces occupying the "Cauldron".
- The Panamanian tanker C.O. Stillman was torpedoed and sunk in the Caribbean Sea by German submarine U-68.
- The 1942 Birthday Honours of King George VI were published.
- Born: Teodoro Obiang Nguema Mbasogo, 2nd President of Equatorial Guinea, in Acoacán, Spanish Guinea
- Died:
  - Virginia Lee Corbin, 31, American actress;
  - Richard E. Fleming, 24, United States Marine and Medal of Honor recipient (killed in the Battle of Midway)
  - Tamon Yamaguchi, 49, Japanese admiral (killed in the Battle of Midway)

== June 6, 1942 (Saturday) ==
- During the Battle of Midway, Japanese cruiser Mikuma was bombed and sunk by Douglas SBD Dauntless aircraft. American destroyer Hammann was torpedoed and sunk by Japanese submarine I-168.
- The Action of 6 June 1942 was fought off Recife, Brazil. The German commerce raider Stier sank the American Liberty ship Stanvac Calcutta.
- In the Aleutian Islands Campaign, the Japanese occupation of Attu and Kisa began.
- Shut Out won the Belmont Stakes.
- German submarines U-223, U-265 and U-383 were commissioned.
- Born: Klaus Bednarz, German journalist and writer, in Falkensee (d. 2015)

== June 7, 1942 (Sunday) ==
- The Battle of Midway ended in a decisive American victory, marking a turning point in the Pacific War.
- The American aircraft carrier USS Yorktown sank the day after being torpedoed by Japanese submarine I-168 at Midway.
- The American seaplane tender Gannet was torpedoed and sunk in the Caribbean Sea by German submarine U-159.
- British Commandos executed Operation Albumen, an overnight raid on German airfields on Axis-occupied Crete. The British managed to destroy 5 aircraft, damage 29 others and set fire to several vehicles and significant quantities of supplies.
- The Chicago Tribune published a front-page article titled "Navy Had Word of Jap Plan to Strike at Sea", providing clues from which the Japanese might have figured out that the Americans had broken their codes ahead of the Battle of Midway. Navy Secretary Frank Knox demanded that the Tribune be prosecuted, but once the Navy realized that the Japanese did not change their codes after the article appeared, the case was quietly dropped to avoid bringing the enemy's attention to the story.
- Born: Muammar Gaddafi, Libyan politician and revolutionary, dictator of Libya (official date of birth) (d. 2011)
- Died: Alan Blumlein, 38, English electronics engineer and inventor (plane crash)

== June 8, 1942 (Monday) ==
- Shelling of Newcastle: Japanese submarine I-21 shelled the Australian city of Newcastle, New South Wales but did little damage.
- The nine-day long Attack on Sydney Harbour by Japanese submarines ended indecisively.
- The United States Department of War created the European Theater of Operations, United States Army (ETOUSA).
- Douglas MacArthur suggested to Army Chief of Staff George Marshall that an offensive be taken in the Pacific with New Britain, New Ireland and New Guinea as the objective.

== June 9, 1942 (Tuesday) ==
- The Combined Production and Resources Board was set up to allocate the combined economic resources of the United States and Britain.
- A lavish funeral was held for Reinhard Heydrich in Berlin. He was posthumously awarded the German Order.
- British aircraft attacked the Italian naval base at Taranto.

== June 10, 1942 (Wednesday) ==
- The Germans crossed the Donets near Izium.
- Axis forces launched the Kozara Offensive against the Yugoslav Partisans in northwestern Bosnia.
- Lidice massacre: Units of the Nazi Ordnungspolizei and Sicherheitsdienst shot all 173 male residents of the Czech village of Lidice aged over 15 in retaliation for the assassination of Reinhard Heydrich (mistakenly believed to have been carried out by residents). Of 503 inhabitants, a total of around 340 were killed, including 82 children deported to Chełmno extermination camp, and the remainder were removed. All domestic animals were killed and graves despoiled, the village was burned, remains blown up and the site landscaped out of existence; Nazi propaganda (which was open about the event) stated "The name of the village was immediately abolished."
- Free French forces (some 2,700 men) evacuated Bir Hakeim and escaped through a minefield, where they were picked up by British patrols of the 7th Armoured Division.
- British cargo ship Empire Clough was sunk in the Atlantic Ocean on her maiden voyage by German submarine U-94.
- British economist John Maynard Keynes was made a peer.
- Born:
  - Gordon Burns, journalist and broadcaster, in Belfast, Northern Ireland;
  - Preston Manning, politician, in Edmonton, Alberta, Canada

== June 11, 1942 (Thursday) ==
- The Battle of Bir Hakeim ended. German and Italian forces captured Bir Hakeim although most of the defenders had been evacuated.
- German submarine U-522 was commissioned.
- Born: Jeannette Corbiere Lavell, activist, in Wiikwemkoong, Ontario, Canada
- Died: Michael Kitzelmann, 26, German soldier (executed for condemning Nazi atrocities)

== June 12, 1942 (Friday) ==
- Rommel broke out of the Cauldron and trapped British forces between Knightsbridge and El Adem.
- The Allies launched Operation Harpoon and Operation Vigorous, two simultaneous convoys sent to supply Malta.
- Operation Pastorius: German submarine U-202 landed four saboteurs on American soil at Amagansett, New York, the first of many intended operations to sabotage economic targets within the United States.
- The British destroyer Grove was torpedoed and sunk off Egypt by German submarine U-77.
- Anne Frank received a diary for her thirteenth birthday.
- After a crow strikes the starboard radial engine, Royal Air Force pilots Group Captain Ken Gatward and navigator Flight Sergeant George Fern, successfully conduct The Beaufighter Raid in Nazi-occupied Paris.
- Born: Bert Sakmann, cell physiologist and Nobel laureate, in Stuttgart, Germany

== June 13, 1942 (Saturday) ==
- Black Saturday: After taking heavy losses, British and South African forces began to evacuate the Gazala Line.
- U.S. President Franklin D. Roosevelt issued Executive Order 9182, creating the Office of Strategic Services and Office of War Information.
- The Soviet troop transport Gruzyia was bombed and sunk in the Black Sea by the Luftwaffe.
- German submarine U-157 was depth charged and sunk northeast of Havana, Cuba by the U.S. Coast Guard cutter Thetis.
- German submarine U-185 was commissioned.
- Born: Abdulsalami Abubakar, army general and 11th President of Nigeria, in Minna, Niger State

== June 14, 1942 (Sunday) ==
- During the Battle of Gazala the Germans struck north to the Libyan coast in an effort to cut off British forces in the Gazala sector, but General Ritchie effected their withdrawal.
- During Operation Harpoon the British destroyer HMS Hasty was torpedoed off Sirte by a German motor torpedo boat and so badly damaged that she was scuttled the next day.
- The British cruiser Liverpool was severely damaged in the Mediterranean by Italian Savoia-Marchetti SM.79 bombers and knocked out of action until July 1943.
- Mexico and the Philippines signed the Declaration by United Nations.
- The General Electric Company in Bridgeport, Connecticut finished production on the new M1 rocket launcher, commonly known as the bazooka.

== June 15, 1942 (Monday) ==
- The 21st Panzer Division reached Sidi Rezegh.
- In the Battle of Gazala, British forces withdrew from Knightsbridge.
- Exiled Greek King George II addressed the U.S. Congress in Washington.
- Operation Harpoon ended with only two of the original six merchant ships completing the journey.
- The British destroyer Bedouin was attacked by Italian cruisers and aircraft and sunk off the island of Pantelleria.
- The British destroyer Hasty was scuttled near Crete the day after being torpedoed by German E-boat S-55.
- The British light cruiser Newcastle was torpedoed in the Mediterranean by the German E-boat S-66 and knocked out of the war until March 1943.
- During Operation Vigorous the Australian destroyer Nestor was bombed and severely damaged off Crete by Regia Aeronautica aircraft and had to be scuttled the next day.
- Died: Vera Figner, 89, Russian revolutionary

== June 16, 1942 (Tuesday) ==
- Operation Vigorous failed when the Allied convoy found its way to Malta blocked by the Italian fleet and had to return to Alexandria.
- The British cruiser Hermione was torpedoed and sunk south of Crete by German submarine U-205.
- South African fighter ace John Frost went missing in action near Bir Hakeim, Egypt. His aircraft and remains were never found.
- German submarine U-302 was commissioned.
- The comedic one-act play The Apollo of Bellac by Jean Giraudoux was first performed at the Teatro Municipal in Rio de Janeiro.
- The war film Eagle Squadron starring Robert Stack, Diana Barrymore, John Loder and Nigel Bruce was released.
- Born: John Rostill, bassist and composer (The Shadows), in Birmingham, England (d. 1973)

== June 17, 1942 (Wednesday) ==
- Japanese Prime Minister Hideki Tojo was slightly wounded when a Korean nationalist shot him in the left arm outside the old war ministry building in Tokyo. Japanese police returned fire and killed the man identified as 31-year old Park Soowon. The incident was not revealed to the public for two months.
- Axis forces gained control of the coastal road to Bardia, completing the isolation of Tobruk. The Allies withdrew from Sidi Rezegh, Ed Duda and El Adem.
- The British destroyer HMS Wild Swan was bombed and sunk in the Bay of Biscay by the Luftwaffe.
- President Roosevelt signed a bill raising the minimum pay of American servicemen to $50 a month.
- German submarines U-466 and U-664 were commissioned.
- This is the cover date of the first issue of Yank, the Army Weekly.
- Born: Mohamed ElBaradei, Vice President of Egypt, in Cairo
- Died: Jessie Bond, 89, English singer and actress

== June 18, 1942 (Thursday) ==
- Winston Churchill arrived in Washington, D.C. for talks with President Roosevelt.
- German forces besieging Sevastopol captured Fortress Maxim Gorky.
- Axis forces reached Kambut, Libya.
- South of Jacksonville, Florida, the German submarine U-584 landed four more saboteurs as part of Operation Pastorius.
- Charles de Gaulle gave a speech at the Royal Albert Hall in London praising the unity of the Resistance movements.
- German submarines U-357 and U-627 were commissioned.
- Born:
  - Roger Ebert, film critic, journalist and screenwriter, in Urbana, Illinois (d. 2013)
  - Thabo Mbeki, 2nd President of South Africa, in Mbewuleni, South Africa
  - Paul McCartney, singer, songwriter, multi-instrumentalist and member of the Beatles, in Liverpool, England
  - Carl Radle, blues and rock bassist, in Tulsa, Oklahoma (d. 1980)
  - Nick Tate, actor, in Sydney, Australia
  - Hans Vonk, conductor, in Amsterdam, Netherlands (d. 2004)
- Died:
  - Eliszewa Binder, 21 or 22, Polish-born Jewish Holocaust diarist and victim
  - Jozef Gabčík, 30, Slovak soldier and one of Reinhard Heydrich's assassins (suicide)
  - Adolf Hühnlein, 60, German soldier and Nazi official
  - Jan Kubiš, 28, Czech soldier and one of Reinhard Heydrich's assassins (died of wounds sustained in a gun battle)
  - Arthur Pryor, 71, American trombone player and bandleader

== June 19, 1942 (Friday) ==
- The Second Washington Conference began.
- A light aircraft carrying German major Joachim Reichel crash-landed on the Eastern Front behind Russian lines. Reichel was killed in the crash and documents he was carrying pertaining to the upcoming German offensive fell into Soviet hands. German High Command debated over how much to revise their plans in light of the security breach but as it turned out, Stalin believed the documents were planted by the Germans in order to deceive the Soviets and ordered them to be ignored.
- Soviet submarine Shch-214 was torpedoed and sunk in the Black Sea by the Italian motor torpedo boat MAS-571.
- The Italian cargo ship Carlotta, sailing from Bar to Dubrovnik, struck a mine at 08:45 local time west of Cape Platamuni near Budva and sank at 08:58.
- Died: Alois Eliáš, 51, Czechoslovak general and politician (executed)

== June 20, 1942 (Saturday) ==
- Churchill and Roosevelt decided upon a North Africa campaign.
- Bombardment of Estevan Point Lighthouse: Japanese submarine I-26 shelled the Estevan Point lighthouse on Vancouver Island in British Columbia, but failed to hit its target.
- German submarines U-224 and U-446 were commissioned.
- "Sleepy Lagoon" by Harry James and His Orchestra hit #1 on the Billboard singles charts.
- The comic book villain Two-Face made his first appearance in Detective Comics issue #66 (cover date August).
- Born: Brian Wilson, musician, record producer and co-founder of The Beach Boys, in Inglewood, California (d. 2025)

== June 21, 1942 (Sunday) ==
- Tobruk fell to Axis forces, completing victory in the Battle of Gazala. The Germans claimed 25,000 prisoners.
- General Ritchie decided to fall back to Mersa Matruh and ordered XIII Corps to delay the enemy.
- Bombardment of Fort Stevens: An Imperial Japanese submarine fired on Fort Stevens in Oregon on the west coast of the United States.
- The beached Italian destroyer Strale was torpedoed and destroyed near Cape Bon by British submarine Turbulent.
- The temperature in Tirat Zvi reached 54 degrees Celsius (129.2 degrees Fahrenheit), for what remains the highest temperature ever recorded in Israel.

== June 22, 1942 (Monday) ==
- Vichy French Prime Minister Pierre Laval made a radio broadcast in which he stated, "I wish for a German victory, because, without it, Bolshevism tomorrow would settle everywhere." This speech shocked many of the French people who were still holding out hope that the Vichy regime was playing a waiting game with the Germans until France could be liberated in an Allied victory.
- Erwin Rommel was promoted to the rank of field marshal as a reward for his victory in the Battle of Gazala.

== June 23, 1942 (Tuesday) ==
- Hitler wrote to Benito Mussolini with "heartfelt advice" recommending that he postpone Operation Herkules and instead "order the continuation of operations to seek the complete destruction of British forces to the very limits of what your high command and Marshal Rommel think is militarily possible with their existing troops. The goddess of fortune in battle comes to commanders only once, and he who fails to seize the opportunity at such a moment will never be given a second chance." Mussolini complied with Hitler's veiled order and postponed Herkules to September.
- Albert Speer told Hitler that nuclear science would reap benefits in the distant future, but no superbomb could be produced in time to affect the war. The German military decided to abandon nuclear research as a result. That same day, Werner Heisenberg almost died when his experimental reactor at Leipzig suffered a leak that started a fire. Heisenberg and his assistant Robert Döpel extinguished the fire but noticed the sphere was beginning to swell, and both men ran outside before the reactor exploded and the lab was destroyed. Rumor spread that the scientists had been killed in a uranium bomb explosion, and when word of it reached the scientists working on the Manhattan Project, they assumed that the Germans had achieved a sustained nuclear chain reaction and were considerably further ahead in their research than they actually were.

== June 24, 1942 (Wednesday) ==
- German and Italian forces crossed the border from Libya into Egypt.
- Units of the Nazi Gestapo, SS and Czech collaborators shot all 33 adult residents of the Czech village of Ležáky in retaliation for the presence of a Czech resistance operative in the aftermath of the assassination of Reinhard Heydrich. 11 children were deported to Chełmno extermination camp and gassed. The village was demolished and never rebuilt. Nazi propaganda openly announced the event on June 26.
- Dwight D. Eisenhower arrived in London to assume command of European Theater of Operations, United States Army.
- German submarine U-266 was commissioned.
- Born:
  - Dustin Gee, comedian, in York, England (d. 1986)
  - Michele Lee, actress, singer and dancer, in Los Angeles, California

== June 25, 1942 (Thursday) ==
- Claude Auchinleck replaced Neil Ritchie as Commander of the British Eighth Army.
- The Second Washington Conference ended.
- Admiral Ernest King, after studying MacArthur's plan, rejected it as too ambitious and suggested that the Solomon and Santa Cruz Islands be taken first.
- The Japanese destroyer Yamakaze was torpedoed and sunk south of Yokosuka by the American submarine USS Nautilus.
- Tom Driberg attained political office for the first time when he won the Maldon by-election.
- German submarines U-338, U-523 and U-628 were commissioned.
- Born: Willis Reed, basketball player, in Lincoln Parish, Louisiana (d. 2023)
- Died: Zénon Bernard, 49, Luxembourgian communist politician

== June 26, 1942 (Friday) ==
- The German 11th Army opened its assault on the inner defenses of Sevastopol.
- The Grumman F6F Hellcat had its first flight.
- President Roosevelt signed a new law prohibiting the making of unauthorized photographs or sketches of military property such as bases or ships.
- Soviet destroyer Bezuprechny was sunk by the Luftwaffe at Sevastopol with the loss of 320 men.
- Born:
  - J. J. Dillon, professional wrestler and manager, in Trenton, New Jersey;
  - Gilberto Gil, musician, in Salvador, Bahia, Brazil
- Died: Gene Stack, 25, American baseball player (pneumonia)

== June 27, 1942 (Saturday) ==
- Fighting resumed on the North African front at Mersa Matruh.
- Allied convoy PQ 17 left Iceland bound for Arkhangelsk in the Soviet Union.
- Winston Churchill arrived back in England. A joint Anglo-U.S. statement on the Washington Conference was issued reporting that subjects discussed included war production, shipping and plans to help China.
- The FBI announced the arrest of eight conspirators who planned to carry out Operation Pastorius.
- Ramón Castillo became 25th President of Argentina, replacing the ailing Roberto María Ortiz.
- The British war film One of Our Aircraft Is Missing starring Godfrey Tearle, Eric Portman and Hugh Williams, was released.
- White Rose, a non-violent, intellectual resistance group, first began its anti-Nazi activities in Munich.
- Institute for the Works of Religion is established in Vatican City.

== June 28, 1942 (Sunday) ==
- The Germans began Case Blue on the Eastern Front. The summer offensive opened with the Battle of Voronezh.
- Australian commandos conducted the Raid on Salamaua in New Guinea.
- Born:
  - Chris Hani, leader of the South African Communist Party, in Cofimvaba, South Africa (d. 1993);
  - Rupert Sheldrake, biochemist, in Newark-on-Trent, Nottinghamshire, England
  - Frank Zane, American professional bodybuilder and actor, in Kingston, Pennsylvania

== June 29, 1942 (Monday) ==
- Mersa Matruh fell to Axis forces.
- Benito Mussolini flew to Derna, Libya in anticipation of leading a triumphal entry of Axis forces into Cairo.

== June 30, 1942 (Tuesday) ==
- German submarine U-158 was bombed and sunk west of Bermuda by an American PBM Mariner flying boat.
- All remaining Jewish schools were closed in Germany.
- German submarine U-182 was commissioned.
- Died: William Henry Jackson, 99, American painter, Civil War veteran and photographer
