= April 1942 =

Month of 1942

| << | April 1942 | | | | | >> |
| Su | Mo | Tu | We | Th | Fr | Sa |
| | | | 1 | 2 | 3 | 4 |
| 5 | 6 | 7 | 8 | 9 | 10 | 11 |
| 12 | 13 | 14 | 15 | 16 | 17 | 18 |
| 19 | 20 | 21 | 22 | 23 | 24 | 25 |
| 26 | 27 | 28 | 29 | 30 |

The following events occurred in April 1942:

== April 1, 1942 (Wednesday) ==
- In the Burma Campaign, Japanese forces attacked Prome in strength.
- The Pacific War Council was formed in Washington, D.C.
- Italian cruiser Giovanni delle Bande Nere was sunk off Stromboli by the British submarine HMS Urge.
- The British submarines P36 and Pandora were bombed and sunk at Malta by Regia Aeronautica aircraft.
- The American tanker SS Tiger was torpedoed off Cape Henry, Virginia by German submarine U-754. An attempt was made to tow the Tiger but she foundered and sank in Chesapeake Bay the following day.
- William Temple became Archbishop of Canterbury.
- Łachwa Ghetto was created.
- German submarine U-183 was commissioned.
- Born: Samuel R. Delany, author, professor and literary critic, in New York City

== April 2, 1942 (Thursday) ==
- The Battle of Suursaari ended in Finnish victory.
- British troops retreated from Prome.
- Juan Antonio Ríos became the 24th President of Chile.
- American coastal steamer David H. Atwater was controversially sunk off the U.S. east coast by gunfire from German submarine U-552.
- The German submarines U-119, U-463 and U-616 were commissioned.
- The comedy film My Favorite Blonde starring Bob Hope and Madeleine Carroll was released.
- Born: Leon Russell, musician, in Lawton, Oklahoma (d. 2016); Hiroyuki Sakai, chef, in Izumi, Kagoshima, Japan; Roshan Seth, actor, in Patna, British India

== April 3, 1942 (Friday) ==
- Bombing of Mandalay: The Burmese capital of Mandalay suffered a devastating air raid when the Japanese dropped incendiary bombs that created a firestorm killing about 2,000 civilians.
- German submarine U-702 was lost to a mine in the North Sea.
- The action-adventure film Jungle Book starring Sabu Dastagir was released.
- Born:
  - Marsha Mason, actress and director, in St. Louis, Missouri;
  - Wayne Newton, singer and entertainer, in Norfolk, Virginia
- Died: Paul Gilson, 76, Belgian musician and composer

== April 4, 1942 (Saturday) ==
- The Luftwaffe carried out Operation Eisstoß (Ice Assault) with the objective of smashing the Soviet fleet at Kronstadt, which was well-protected by anti-aircraft guns. 62 Stukas, 70 bombers and 50 Bf 109s were deployed and managed to inflict damage on thirteen Soviet warships, but not a single one was sunk.
- United States tanker Byron D. Benson was torpedoed off the Carrituck Inlet by German submarine U-552. The damaged tanker finally sank on April 8.
- Born: Jim Fregosi, baseball player and manager, in San Francisco, California (d. 2015)

== April 5, 1942 (Sunday) ==
- As part of the Indian Ocean Raid, carrier-based aircraft of the Imperial Japanese Navy carried out the Easter Sunday Raid against Colombo, Ceylon. The British heavy cruisers Cornwall and Dorsetshire and the armed merchant cruiser Hector were all sunk.
- British destroyer HMS Tenedos was bombed and sunk at Colombo by Japanese aircraft.
- The British destroyer Gallant and minesweeper Abingdon were bombed and irretrievably damaged by enemy aircraft at Malta.
- The Japanese completed the Invasion of Buka and Bougainville.
- British Commandos attempted Operation Myrmidon, a raid on the Adour Estuary in southwest France, but the attack was called off when they encountered a sandbar that they had not expected.
- Adolf Hitler issued Directive No. 41, pertaining to the summer offensive on the Eastern Front codenamed Case Blue.
- Born:
  - Pascal Couchepin, politician, in Martigny, Switzerland;
  - Peter Greenaway, film director, in Newport, Wales

== April 6, 1942 (Monday) ==
- Operation Bamberg ended in German victory.
- The British destroyer Havock ran aground off Kelibia. Her crew and passengers were captured and interned by the Vichy French.
- The Indian sloop HMIS Indus was bombed and sunk by Japanese aircraft off Akyab.
- Naotake Satō, the new Japanese ambassador to the Soviet Union, presented his credentials to Vyacheslav Molotov.
- Born: Barry Levinson, film producer and director, in Baltimore, Maryland

== April 7, 1942 (Tuesday) ==
- A devastating air raid was conducted against the Maltese capital of Valletta. The Royal Opera House, one of the most beautiful buildings in the city, took a direct hit and was reduced to rubble.
- Cripps' mission failed when the Indian National Congress Working Committee rejected Stafford Cripps' Draft Declaration for postwar independence.
- The Norwegian factory ship Lancing was torpedoed and sunk off Cape Hatteras, North Carolina by German submarine U-552.
- Died: Nikola Andrić, 74, Croatian writer, philologist and translator

== April 8, 1942 (Wednesday) ==
- Japanese forces landed on Lorengau in the Admiralty Islands.
- The floating drydock Dewey was scuttled at Mariveles, Bataan to prevent capture by the Japanese. She would later be raised by the Japanese but resunk by Allied forces.
- The Canadian government created the Park Steamship Company to build Park ships, the Canadian equivalent of the American Liberty ships and British Fort ships.
- German submarine U-195 was commissioned.
- Born: Roger Chapman, rock vocalist (Family), in Leicester, England

== April 9, 1942 (Thursday) ==
- The Battle of Bataan ended in Japanese victory. The Bataan Death March began in which 60,000–80,000 Filipino and American prisoners of war were forcibly marched 97 miles to Camp O'Donnell.
- The British aircraft carrier Hermes, destroyer Vampire and corvette Hollyhock were bombed and sunk east of Ceylon by Japanese aircraft.
- The British destroyer Lance was bombed at Malta and damaged beyond the point of repair.
- The Norwegian merchant freighter Benwood collided with the steam tanker Robert C. Tuttle off the coast of Florida and was abandoned as a total loss.
- German submarine U-617 and U-662 were commissioned.

== April 10, 1942 (Friday) ==
- The Indian Ocean raid ended in a Japanese victory.
- The minesweeper USS Finch was bombed and damaged by Japanese aircraft in Manila Bay, sinking the next day.
- The submarine tender USS Canopus was scuttled at Mariveles, Bataan.
- Hotelier Conrad Hilton married Zsa Zsa Gabor at the Santa Fe Hotel in New Mexico.
- Born:
  - Nick Auf der Maur, journalist and politician, in Montreal, Quebec, Canada (d. 1998);
  - Hayedeh, singer, in Tehran, Iran (d. 1990)

== April 11, 1942 (Saturday) ==
- The Battle of Yenangyaung began in Burma.
- The British destroyer HMS Kingston was bombed and sunk at Malta by the Luftwaffe.
- The cargo ship Empire Cowper of convoy QP 10 was bombed and sunk in the Barents Sea by Junkers Ju 88 aircraft.
- The American steam tanker SS Gulfamerica was torpedoed and damaged off Jacksonville, Florida by the German submarine U-123, sinking five days later.
- British Commandos conducted Operation J V, an overnight raid on Boulogne harbour.

== April 12, 1942 (Sunday) ==
- Japanese forces in Burma captured the town of Myanaung.
- The first units of the Hungarian 2nd Army left for the Eastern Front.
- Jawaharlal Nehru pledged "no surrender" to the Axis despite the rejection of Britain's independence plan.
- Born:
  - Jacob Zuma, 4th President of South Africa, in Nkandla, KwaZulu-Natal, South Africa;
  - Carlos Reutemann, racing driver, in Santa Fe, Argentina (d. 2021)

== April 13, 1942 (Monday) ==
- The Imber friendly fire incident occurred at Imber, England when a Royal Air Force fighter aircraft taking part in a firepower demonstration accidentally opened fire on a crowd of spectators, killing 25 and wounding 71.
- Iran broke off diplomatic relations with Japan.
- The Panamanian cargo ship El Occidente of convoy QP 10 was torpedoed and sunk in the Barents Sea by German submarine U-435.
- The British tanker Empire Amethyst was torpedoed and sunk in the Caribbean Sea by German submarine U-154.
- The Federal Communications Commission reduced the minimum required programming time of U.S. television stations from 15 hours a week down to 4 for the duration of the war.
- Byron Nelson won the Masters Tournament in a playoff against Ben Hogan. The Masters would not be played again until 1946.
- Born: Gloria Feldt, author and feminist activist, in Temple, Texas

== April 14, 1942 (Tuesday) ==
- Under German pressure, Philippe Pétain reinstated Pierre Laval as Vice Premier of Vichy France.
- On Budget Day in the United Kingdom, Chancellor of the Exchequer Kingsley Wood announced that Britain's war expenditures for the year ended March 31 totalled £4 billion, exceeding the estimate by £285 million. Wood projected expenditure for 1942–43 at £5.286 billion and raised taxes on non-essential goods and services such as alcohol, tobacco, cinema admissions and cosmetics.
- German submarine U-85 became the first casualty of Operation Drumbeat when she was sunk near Cape Hatteras by the American destroyer Roper.
- German submarine U-252 was depth charged and sunk in the Atlantic Ocean by British warships.
- British submarine Upholder was sunk in the Mediterranean Sea, probably by depth charges from an Italian ship.
- The Father Charles Coughlin-founded periodical Social Justice was banned from the U.S. mails on charges of violating the Espionage Act of 1917 by attacking the American war effort.
- Born:
  - Valeriy Brumel, Olympic high jumper, in Razvedki, Amur Oblast, USSR (d. 2003);
  - Valentin Lebedev, cosmonaut, in Moscow, USSR

== April 15, 1942 (Wednesday) ==
- Award of the George Cross to Malta: King George VI awarded the George Cross to the island of Malta.
- The Riom Trial was adjourned sine die because the defendants were presenting their own cases too well and increasingly discrediting the Vichy regime.
- In Burma, the Japanese 55th Infantry Division captured Thawatti on the road to Mandalay.
- German submarine U-262 was commissioned.
- Born:
  - Kenneth Lay, businessman/criminal, in Tyrone, Missouri (d. 2006);
  - Julie Sommars, actress, in Fremont, Nebraska
- Died:
  - Robert Musil, 61, Austrian writer;
  - Joshua Pim, 72, Irish doctor and tennis player

== April 16, 1942 (Thursday) ==
- The Japanese 41st Infantry Regiment invaded the Philippine island of Panay.
- German submarine U-618 was commissioned.
- Died: Princess Alexandra of Saxe-Coburg and Gotha, 63, granddaughter of Queen Victoria

== April 17, 1942 (Friday) ==
- Japanese forces in Burma reached Yenangyaung.
- The main oilfields in Burma were destroyed to prevent them from falling into Japanese hands.
- British Royal Air Force "hedge-hop" raid a submarine engine factory in Augsburg, Germany.
- Born: Buster Williams, jazz bassist, in Camden, New Jersey
- Died: Jean Baptiste Perrin, 71, French physicist and Nobel laureate

== April 18, 1942 (Saturday) ==
- The Doolittle Raid was conducted by U.S. warplanes on the Japanese capital of Tokyo. Although little damage was done it provided an important boost to American morale.
- The Battle of Nanos was fought between Italian forces and Slovene Partisans.
- Action on the Eastern Front entered a lull as the terrain reverted to spring mud.
- German submarine U-443 was commissioned.
- The Toronto Maple Leafs defeated the Detroit Red Wings 3-1 in Game 7 of the Stanley Cup Finals to complete one of the greatest comebacks in sports history. After losing the first three games of the series, the Maple Leafs won the next four and claimed their fourth Stanley Cup in franchise history.
- Died: Gertrude Vanderbilt Whitney, 67, American sculptor, art patron and collector

== April 19, 1942 (Sunday) ==
- The Battle of Yenangyaung ended in Allied tactical victory
- Bernard Joseph Smith won the Boston Marathon, setting a new American record time of 2:26:51.
- Warren Spahn made his major league baseball debut for the Boston Braves, retiring both of the New York Giants batters he faced.
- Born:
  - Frank Elstner, television presenter, in Linz, Austria;
  - David Fanshawe. composer and ethnomusicologist, in Paignton, Devon, England (d. 2010)

== April 20, 1942 (Monday) ==
- Operation Trio: The Germans and Italians began a joint counter-insurgency operation in the Independent State of Croatia.
- The Allies executed Operation Calendar, the delivery of 48 Supermarine Spitfire aircraft to Malta. However, the planes were almost immediately destroyed on the ground.
- The British cargo ship Empire Dryden was torpedoed and sunk in the Atlantic Ocean by German submarine U-572.
- Born: Arto Paasilinna, journalist and writer, in Kittilä, Finland (d. 2018)

== April 21, 1942 (Tuesday) ==
- Leonid Govorov became commander of the Leningrad Group of Forces of the Leningrad Front.
- The Japanese 18th Infantry division captured Kyidaunggan on the road to Mandalay.
- Irish-American aviator Edward O'Hare became the first naval recipient of the Medal of Honor.
- An Anglo-Canadian force conducted Operation Abercrombie, an overnight reconnaissance raid on the area around the French coastal village of Hardelot.

== April 22, 1942 (Wednesday) ==
- The Allies activated Task Force 44, a naval task force in the Pacific.
- The Alfred Hitchcock-directed spy thriller film Saboteur starring Robert Cummings and Priscilla Lane premiered in Washington, D.C.
- German submarine U-354 was commissioned.
- Born: Egil Olsen, footballer and manager, in Fredrikstad, Norway
- Died: Pirie MacDonald, 75, American portrait photographer

== April 23, 1942 (Thursday) ==
- South Africa broke off diplomatic relations with Vichy France.
- Exeter Blitz: The Luftwaffe bombed Exeter overnight in the first attack of the Baedeker Raids.
- German submarine U-619 was commissioned.
- Born:
  - Ken Auletta, American writer and journalist, in Brooklyn, New York
  - Sandra Dee, actress, in Bayonne, New Jersey (d. 2005)

== April 24, 1942 (Friday) ==
- The first prototype Miles Martinet was flown.
- The British cargo ship Empire Drum was torpedoed and sunk in the Atlantic Ocean southeast of New York by German submarine U-136.
- German submarine U-196 was commissioned.
- The comedy gangster film Larceny, Inc. starring Edward G. Robinson premiered in New York City.
- Born: Barbra Streisand, singer, songwriter, actress and filmmaker, in Brooklyn, New York
- Died:
  - Louis Bernacchi, 65, Belgian physicist and astronomer;
  - Deenanath Mangeshkar, 41, Indian singer and composer;
  - Lucy Maude Montgomery, 67, Canadian author

== April 25, 1942 (Saturday) ==
- American troops arrived in New Caledonia to assist in defense of the archipelago.
- Berlin radio announced that French general Henri Giraud had escaped from Königstein Fortress. A 100,000 mark reward was offered for information leading to his recapture.
- 16-year old Princess Elizabeth registered for war service.
- German submarines U-212 and U-382 were commissioned.
- Born:
  - Mr. Hito, professional wrestler, in Tennōji-ku, Osaka, Japan (d. 2010);
  - Jon Kyl, politician, in Oakland, Nebraska

== April 26, 1942 (Sunday) ==
- The German Reichstag convened for what would be its final session. Chancellor Adolf Hitler gave a long speech asking for total legislative and judicial power that would give him the right to promote or punish anyone with no regard to legal procedures. The Reichstag agreed and Hitler was given absolute power of life and death.
- A gas and coal dust explosion at Benxihu Colliery in Manchukuo killed as many as 1,549 workers.
- The American destroyer USS Sturtevant struck a mine and sank off Key West, Florida.
- Born:
  - Claudine Auger, actress, in Paris, France (d. 2019);
  - Bobby Rydell, singer, in Philadelphia, Pennsylvania (d. 2022)

== April 27, 1942 (Monday) ==
- A plebiscite on conscription was held in Canada. 65.53% voted in favour of conscription, with Quebec being the only province to have a majority voting against.
- All Jews in the Nazi-occupied Netherlands were ordered to wear the yellow badge.
- The 22nd Infantry Division of the Japanese Thirteenth Army in China captured Lungyu.
- A tornado swept through Pryor, Oklahoma causing extensive damage and leaving 52 people dead.
- The British submarine Urge was mined and sunk off Malta.
- Born:
  - Ruth Glick, author, in Lexington, Kentucky;
  - Jim Keltner, drummer, in Tulsa, Oklahoma
- Died:
  - Arthur L. Bristol, 55, United States Navy Vice Admiral (heart attack);
  - Emil von Sauer, 79, German composer and pianist

== April 28, 1942 (Tuesday) ==
- The 22nd Infantry Division of the Japanese Thirteenth Army in China captured Chinlan.
- Count Galeazzo Ciano promised Amin al-Husseini and Rashid Ali al-Gaylani that Italy would give formal recognition to the independence of Arab states.
- A 15-mile strip of the Atlantic coast around New York began conducting nightly blackouts to counter German U-boat activity in the region.
- President Roosevelt gave a fireside chat on economic policy and sacrifice.
- A Gallup poll indicated that Americans preferred the term World War II for the present conflict.
- Born: Mike Brearley, cricketer, in Harrow, London, England
- Died: John Francis Jackson, 34, Australian fighter ace (shot down by the Japanese at Port Moresby)

== April 29, 1942 (Wednesday) ==
- Hitler met with Benito Mussolini at Salzburg for a conference on Axis war strategy. Mussolini agreed to send more Italian troops to the Eastern Front. The problem of what to do about Malta was also discussed, and plans for an invasion that would be codenamed Operation Herkules took shape.
- In Burma the Japanese occupied Lashio, cutting communications between Mandalay and China.
- An ammonium nitrate explosion at a chemical plant in Tessenderlo, Belgium killed 189 people.
- The "Hollywood Victory Caravan", consisting of many of Hollywood's best-known entertainers, visited Washington for a gala reception on the White House lawn the day before their first show of a 30-city tour promoting the sale of war bonds. Among the many celebrities taking part were Bing Crosby, Bob Hope, Cary Grant, Desi Arnaz, Groucho Marx, Laurel and Hardy, Charles Boyer, Charlotte Greenwood, Claudette Colbert, Olivia de Havilland, Spencer Tracy and Betty Grable.
- German submarine U-412 was commissioned.
- Died: Harold Huston George, 49, American general and flying ace (killed in a ground accident in Australia)

== April 30, 1942 (Thursday) ==
- Dzyatlava massacre: About 1,000 to 1,200 Jews were murdered by German authorities in the Kurpiesze forest near Dzyatlava.
- A general election was held in Japan. Parties endorsed by the Imperial Rule Assistance Association won 381 out of 466 seats.
- The Lyuban Offensive Operation ended in German victory.
- The British cruiser Edinburgh of convoy QP 11 was torpedoed and damaged in the Barents Sea by German submarine U-456 and had to be taken under tow.
- Soviet cargo ship Ashkhabad was torpedoed and sunk south of Cape Lookout by German submarine U-402.
- German submarine U-464 and U-620 were commissioned.
- The musical film My Gal Sal starring Rita Hayworth and Victor Mature was released.
