= May 1942 =

Month of 1942

<<	May 1942					>>
Su	Mo	Tu	We	Th	Fr	Sa
					1	2
3	4	5	6	7	8	9
10	11	12	13	14	15	16
17	18	19	20	21	22	23
24	25	26	27	28	29	30
31

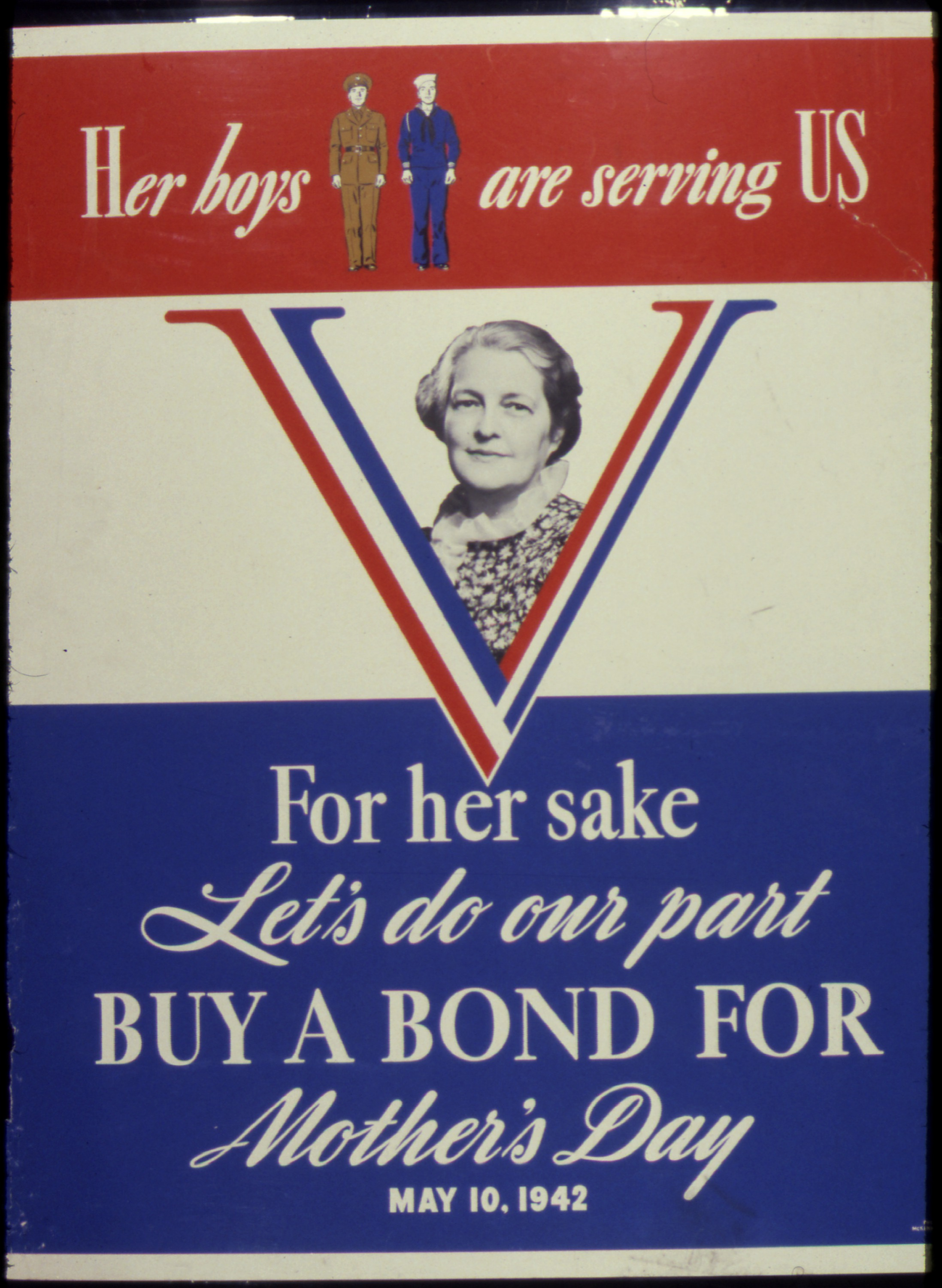

The following events occurred in May 1942:

== May 1, 1942 (Friday) ==
- The British evacuated Mandalay.
- Joseph Stalin published a message on International Workers' Day in which he stated that the Soviet Union was fighting a "patriotic war of liberation" and had no aim of "seizing foreign countries" or "conquering foreign peoples."
- The British destroyer Punjabi sank in the Greenland Sea after a collision with the battleship King George in foggy conditions.

== May 2, 1942 (Saturday) ==
- Mandalay fell to the Japanese.
- German destroyers Hermann Schoemann, Z24 and Z25 attacked the damaged British cruiser Edinburgh off Bear Island. Edinburgh was struck by a torpedo and sunk but not before damaging Hermann Schoemann so severely that she was scuttled.
- German submarine U-573 entered port at Cartagena, Spain for repairs after being severely damaged on April 29 by depth charges from RAF Lockheed Hudsons. Spanish authorities granted U-573 a three-month period for repairs despite protests from the British embassy.
- Japanese seaplane carrier Mizuho sank off Omaezaki the day after being torpedoed by the submarine USS Drum.
- The Polish submarine Jastrząb was sunk in the Barents Sea by friendly fire.
- The American patrol yacht USS Cythera was torpedoed and sunk off the coast of North Carolina by the German submarine U-402.
- Shut Out won the Kentucky Derby.
- Born: Jacques Rogge, 8th President of the International Olympic Committee, in Ghent, Belgium (d. 2021)
- Died: José Abad Santos, 56, 5th Chief Justice of the Supreme Court of the Philippines

== May 3, 1942 (Sunday) ==
- The Japanese Invasion of Tulagi began.
- Japanese troops captured Bhamo, Burma.
- Presidential elections were held in Colombia, won by Alfonso López Pumarejo of the Liberal Party.
- Born: Věra Čáslavská, gymnast, in Prague, Protectorate of Bohemia and Moravia (d. 2016)
- Died:
  - Elías Isaac Alippi, 59, Argentine actor and theatrical impresario;
  - Thorvald Stauning, 68, Prime Minister of Denmark

== May 4, 1942 (Monday) ==
- The Battle of the Coral Sea began.
- In the Burma Campaign, the British evacuated Akyab.
- The Invasion of Tulagi was completed with the Japanese occupation of Tulagi and nearby islands in the Solomons.
- Thamshavn Line sabotage: Company Linge in occupied Norway blew up the transformer station for the railway at Bårdshaug.
- Vilhelm Buhl became Prime Minister of Denmark two days after Thorvald Stauning died in office.
- Hungary broke off diplomatic relations with Uruguay.
- The Japanese destroyer Kikuzaki was torpedoed in Tulagi harbor by U.S. Navy aircraft and sank the next day.
- The submarine rescue ship USS Pigeon and the minesweeper Tanager were sunk at Corregidor by a Japanese dive bomber and shore guns, respectively.

== May 5, 1942 (Tuesday) ==
- The Battle of Madagascar began when the port of Diego-Suarez (now Antsiranana) was seized as part of Operation Ironclad.
- The Battle of Corregidor began.
- The Germans relieved the Kholm Pocket.
- Japanese forces advancing up the Burma Road crossed into China.
- Japanese destroyer Kikuzuki was torpedoed and sunk in Tulagi harbor by American aircraft.
- The French submarine Bévéziers was depth charged and sunk by Swordfish torpedo bombers at Diego Suarez, Madagascar.
- German submarine U-758 was commissioned.
- Born: Tammy Wynette, country singer-songwriter, in Tremont, Mississippi (d. 1998)

== May 6, 1942 (Wednesday) ==
- The Battle of Corregidor ended when 10,000 U.S. and Filipino troops surrendered to the Japanese.
- Chinese forces recaptured Maymyo in Burma.
- The American cargo ship Alcoa Puritan was torpedoed and sunk in the Gulf of Mexico off the mouth of the Mississippi River by German submarine U-507.
- The British cargo ship Empire Buffalo was torpedoed and sunk west of the Cayman Islands by German submarine U-125.
- The American gunboats Luzon, Oahu and Quail were scuttled in Manila Bay to prevent capture.
- German submarine U-263 was commissioned.

== May 7, 1942 (Thursday) ==
- Diego Suarez in northern Madagascar surrendered to the British.
- In the Battle of the Coral Sea, Japanese aircraft carrier Shōhō and the American destroyer Sims were sunk, while the American oiler Neosho was crippled by bombing and had to be scuttled four days later.
- German submarines U-519 and U-621 were commissioned.
- Died:
  - Felix Weingartner, 78, Austrian conductor, composer and pianist

== May 8, 1942 (Friday) ==
- The Philippines Campaign ended in decisive Japanese victory. The Japanese occupation of the Philippines began.
- The Battle of the Coral Sea ended in Japanese tactical victory but Allied strategic victory. The aircraft carrier USS Lexington was scuttled due to battle damage.
- Japanese forces took the northern Burmese city of Myitkyina.
- The British submarine Olympus was sunk by a mine off Malta.
- The failed Cocos Islands mutiny took place when Ceylonese soldiers tried to rebel against their British officers.
- The drama film In This Our Life starring Bette Davis, Olivia de Havilland, Charles Coburn and George Brent was released.
- Born: Terry Neill, footballer and manager, in Belfast, Northern Ireland (d. 2022)

== May 9, 1942 (Saturday) ==
- The Allies began the series of Raids on Deboyne in the Deboyne Islands of the Louisiade Archipelago.
- Japanese forces took Dalirig on Mindanao.
- German submarine U-352 was depth charged and sunk off Morehead City, North Carolina by the Coast Guard ship Icarus.
- Alsab won the Preakness Stakes.
- German submarines U-181, U-221, U-301, U-444 and U-626 were commissioned.
- "Tangerine" by Jimmy Dorsey and His Orchestra hit #1 on the Billboard singles charts.
- Born: John Ashcroft, attorney and politician, in Chicago, Illinois
- Died: Graham McNamee, 53, American radio broadcaster

== May 10, 1942 (Sunday) ==
- The Allies executed Operation Bowery, a repeat of the earlier Operation Calendar delivering Supermarine Spitfire fighter planes to Malta. This time, the newly arrived fighters got back into the air quickly before an air raid could destroy them.
- Winston Churchill gave a radio broadcast on the second anniversary of his being appointed British Prime Minister. Churchill warned the Germans that "we shall treat the unprovoked use of poison gas against our Russian ally exactly as if it were used against ourselves and if we are satisfied that this new outrage has been committed by Hitler we will use our great and growing air superiority in the West to carry gas warfare on the largest possible scale far and wide against military objectives in Germany. It is thus for Hitler to choose whether he wishes to add this additional horror to aerial warfare."
- The British hospital ship Ramb IV was bombed and sunk off Alexandria by the Luftwaffe.
- Died: Joe Weber, 74, American vaudevillian

== May 11, 1942 (Monday) ==
- The three days of Raids on Deboyne ended as the Japanese withdrew from Deboyne.
- The British destroyers Jackal, Kipling and Lively were all bombed and sunk in the Mediterranean Sea by the Luftwaffe.
- The armed naval trawler Bedfordshire was torpedoed and sunk off Ocracoke Island, North Carolina by German submarine U-558.

== May 12, 1942 (Tuesday) ==
- The Second Battle of Kharkov began.
- Japanese forces crossed the Salween River and headed for Kengtung.
- The wartime romance film This Above All starring Tyrone Power and Joan Fontaine was released.
- U-124 sank four British ships in one night
- Born: Ian Dury, rock singer, in Harrow, London, England (d. 2000)

== May 13, 1942 (Wednesday) ==
- Action of 13 May 1942: Motor Torpedo Boats of the Royal Navy attempted to stop the German auxiliary cruiser Stier from reaching Gironde, France. Although Stier made it through the English channel, two German torpedo boats were sunk with one British MTB lost in return.
- Operation Trio concluded.
- The American cargo ship SS Norlantic was torpedoed and sunk in the Atlantic Ocean by the German submarine U-156.
- Born:
  - Jeff Astle, footballer, in Eastwood, Nottinghamshire, England (d. 2002);
  - Richard Butler, diplomat and Governor of Tasmania, in Coolah, New South Wales, Australia

== May 14, 1942 (Thursday) ==
- British forces withdrawing from Burma reached Tamu.
- U.S. intelligence partially decoded a Japanese message indicating that a large force was preparing to invade "AF". Cryptanalyst Joseph Rochefort suspected that AF represented Midway Island, but officials in Washington believed it stood for the Aleutians. The matter was settled by planting an easily readable message from Midway saying that their desalination plant had broken down. When a Japanese message was then transmitted reporting that "AF" was short of water, Rochefort's belief was confirmed.
- The Mexican tanker Potrero del Llano was torpedoed and sunk off Cape Florida by German submarine U-564.
- Gas rationing along the U.S. eastern seaboard went into effect.
- German submarines U-622 and U-663 were commissioned.
- Aaron Copland's classical composition Lincoln Portrait was performed for the first time by the Cincinnati Symphony Orchestra.
- Born: Tony Pérez, baseball player, in Ciego de Ávila, Cuba
- Died:
  - Frank Churchill, 40, American film composer;
  - Harry M. P. Huse, 83, American admiral;
  - Robert Hunter, 68, American sociologist, author and golf course architect

== May 15, 1942 (Friday) ==
- The Zhejiang-Jiangxi campaign begins
- The Women's Army Auxiliary Corps (WAAC) was created in the United States.
- Costa Rica broke off diplomatic relations with Hungary and Romania.
- The first seventeen U.S. states put gasoline rationing into effect after it became apparent that voluntary rationing was insufficient.
- The British cruiser HMS Trinidad of convoy PQ 13 was bombed and damaged in the Atlantic Ocean by Junkers Ju 88 aircraft of the Luftwaffe and had to be scuttled.
- The Slovak parliament retroactively legalized the deportation of Jews from Slovakia.

== May 16, 1942 (Saturday) ==
- Sobibór extermination camp became operational in occupied Poland.
- The Soviet guerrilla campaign known as the Defense of the Adzhimushkay quarry began.
- German submarine U-180 was commissioned.
- Died: Bronisław Malinowski, 58, Polish anthropologist

== May 17, 1942 (Sunday) ==
- On the Eastern Front, the Germans began a counteroffensive against the Barvinkove salient.
- Japanese submarine I-28 was torpedoed and sunk off Truk by the American submarine Tautog.
- Red Star Olympique defeated FC Sète 2–0 in the Coupe De France Final.
- Born: Taj Mahal, blues musician, in Harlem, New York

== May 18, 1942 (Monday) ==
- The biggest contingent of U.S. troops yet to arrive in Europe landed in Northern Ireland.
- Japanese forces in Burma reached Pantha on the Chindwin River.
- An information appliances equipment brand, Epson was founded in Suwa, Nagano Prefecture, Japan. Its predecessor's name was Daiwa Kogyo.
- The espionage drama radio series Counterspy premiered on the NBC Blue Network.
- Born: Nobby Stiles, footballer, in Collyhurst, Manchester, England (d. 2020)

== May 19, 1942 (Tuesday) ==
- The Battle of the Kerch Peninsula ended after 4 months and 23 days with an Axis victory.
- Died: A. E. Waite, 84, American-born British poet

== May 20, 1942 (Wednesday) ==
- The Demyansk Pocket was relieved.
- The United States Navy signed up its first African-American recruits.
- The Liberty ship George Calvert was torpedoed and sunk in the Caribbean Sea off Cuba by German submarine U-753.
- German submarine U-465 was commissioned.

== May 21, 1942 (Thursday) ==
- The Philippine city of Bacolod was occupied by the Japanese.
- Allied convoy PQ 16 departed Iceland for the Soviet Union.
- The Mexican oil tanker Faja de Oro was torpedoed and sunk in the Gulf of Mexico by German submarine U-106. This incident along with the Potrero del Llano sinking on the 14th provided a casus belli for Mexico to declare war on the Axis.
- German submarines U-197 and U-623 were commissioned.
- The comedy-drama film Tortilla Flat starring Spencer Tracy, Hedy Lamarr and John Garfield was released.
- Died:
  - George Antonius, 50, Lebanese-Egyptian author and diplomat;
  - Guttman Landau, 63 to 65, Bessarabian Jewish leader (suicide)

== May 22, 1942 (Friday) ==
- Mexico declared war on Germany, Italy and Japan.
- Townsville Mutiny: About 600 African-American servicemen mutinied in Townsville, Australia in reaction to being regularly subjected to racial abuse by some of their white officers. At least one person was killed and Australian troops were called in to roadblock the rioters.
- Baseball star Ted Williams enlisted in the U.S. Navy aviation program.
- German submarine U-264 was commissioned.
- Born:
  - Ted Kaczynski, American terrorist designated as "The Unabomber" for sending explosives through the mail; in Chicago (d. 2023)
  - Roger Brown, basketball player, in Brooklyn, New York (d. 1997);
  - Rich Garcia, baseball umpire, in Key West, Florida;
  - Barbara Parkins, actress, in Vancouver, British Columbia, Canada

== May 23, 1942 (Saturday) ==
- During the Second Battle of Kharkov, German forces trapped the Soviet 6th and 57th Armies in a pocket at Izium.
- Hitler gave an address to senior Nazis in which he said that concentration camps were the main bulwark against an uprising.
- German submarine U-222 was commissioned.
- United States tanker Samuel Q. Brown was torpedoed and sunk by German submarine U-103 about 100 miles south of Cape Corrientes.
- Born:
  - Gabriel Liiceanu, philosopher, in Râmnicu Vâlcea, Romania;
  - Fred Wedlock, folk singer, in Bristol, England (d. 2010)
- Died:
  - Georges Politzer, 39, French philosopher (executed);
  - Ryland Dillard Tisdale, 47, American naval officer (killed in action at Tamparan in the Philippines)

== May 24, 1942 (Sunday) ==
- Two gatherings in London adopted resolutions calling for a second front in Europe. One was organized by the Communist Party and another held in the London Hippodrome was sponsored by the Daily Express.
- Soviet submarine L-21 was sunk by German aircraft at Leningrad. The sub would be raised and returned to service.
- A 15-minute test blackout centered on Detroit was held starting at 10 p.m., with neighboring communities such as Pontiac and Windsor, Ontario also participating. It was the largest blackout in the Midwestern United States up to that time.
- Born: Ichirō Ozawa, politician, in Mizusawa, Iwate, Japan
- Died: Edgard de Trentinian, 90, French general

== May 25, 1942 (Monday) ==
- Japanese submarine tender Asahi was torpedoed and sunk in the South China Sea by American submarine Salmon.
- Principal photography began on the film Casablanca.
- Died:
  - Emanuel Feuermann, 39, Austrian cellist (complications during surgery for hemorrhoids);
  - John Arthur Hughes, 61, U.S. Marine Corps officer and Medal of Honor recipient

== May 26, 1942 (Tuesday) ==
- The Battle of Gazala and the Battle of Bir Hakeim began in North Africa.
- The Anglo-Soviet Treaty was signed in London, pledging twenty years of alliance and mutual assistance between the United Kingdom and the Soviet Union.

== May 27, 1942 (Wednesday) ==
- Assassination of Reinhard Heydrich (Operation Anthropoid): Czechoslovak paratroopers Jozef Gabčík and Jan Kubiš, acting for the Czechoslovak government in exile and trained in Britain, attempted to assassinate Reinhard Heydrich, acting Reichsprotektor of the Nazi Protectorate of Bohemia and Moravia, in Prague. He was injured and died eight days later. Hitler ordered an investigation and reprisals on the same day as the attempt.
- Five cargo ships of Allied Arctic Convoy PQ 16 were sunk in a single day by the Luftwaffe.sae
- All Jews in Nazi-occupied Belgium were ordered to wear the yellow badge.
- Hideki Tojo addressed the Japanese Diet, reviewing the state of the war and encouraging India to attain independence by rising up against British and American forces.
- Died: Chen Duxiu, 62, General Secretary of the Chinese Communist Party

== May 28, 1942 (Thursday) ==
- The Second Battle of Kharkov ended in Axis victory. When the Izium pocket was destroyed, the Soviet 6th and 57th Armies as well as the 21st Tank Corps were completely annihilated.
- Italian opera singer Ezio Pinza was released from Ellis Island after being held since March on suspicion of being an enemy alien.
- German submarine U-624 was commissioned.
- Born:
  - James Tien, actor, in Guangdong, China;
  - Stanley B. Prusiner, neurologist, biochemist and Nobel laureate, in Des Moines, Iowa

== May 29, 1942 (Friday) ==
- Hitler issued Directive No. 42, canceling Operation Isabella and replacing Operation Attila with Case Anton.
- Jews in Nazi-occupied Paris were ordered to wear the yellow badge starting June 7.
- German submarine U-568 was sunk northeast of Tobruk by British destroyers.
- The biographical musical film Yankee Doodle Dandy starring James Cagney as the songwriter and entertainer George M. Cohan premiered in New York City. Instead of tickets, Warner Bros. sold war bonds to the premiere ranging from $25 to $25,000 in price.
- German submarine U-184 was commissioned.
- Died:
  - John Barrymore, 60, American actor;
  - Akiko Yosano, 63, Japanese author, poet and social reformer

== May 30, 1942 (Saturday) ==
- In Operation Millennium, the British conducted a thousand-plane bombing raid on Cologne targeting the city's chemical and machine tool industries. Almost 1,500 tons of bombs were dropped in 90 minutes, killing 469 people and leaving 45,000 homeless.
- 28 of the original 35 merchant ships of Allied convoy PQ 16 arrived at Murmansk. Eight of them went on to Arkhangelsk and arrived there June 1.
- Fred Korematsu was arrested on a street corner in San Leandro, California after being identified as being of Japanese ancestry, despite plastic surgery on his eyelids in an attempt to pass for Caucasian. The legality of his internment would be taken all the way to the Supreme Court in the landmark case Korematsu v. United States.
- German submarine U-445 was released.
- Died:
  - Jessie Tarbox Beals, 71, American photographer;
  - Félix Cadras, 36, French Resistance fighter (executed)

== May 31, 1942 (Sunday) ==
- The series of submarine attacks on the city of Sydney known collectively as the attack on Sydney Harbour began.
- Sam Snead won the PGA Championship.
