= USS Kenneth M. Willett =

John C. Butler-class destroyer escort

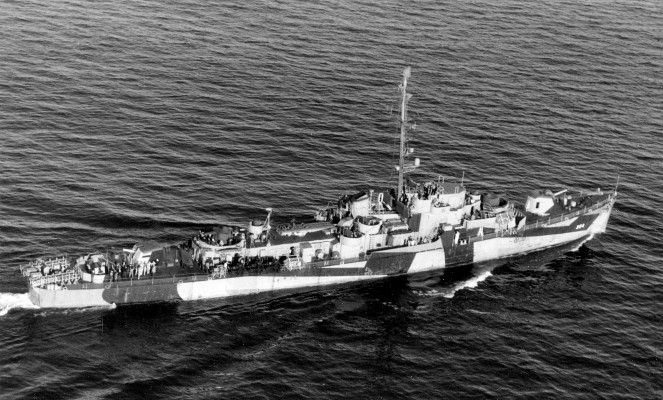
- Off Cape Cod, September 1944

History

United States
- Name: Kenneth M. Willett
- Namesake: Kenneth Martin Willett
- Builder: Consolidated Steel Corporation, Orange, Texas
- Laid down: 10 January 1944
- Launched: 7 March 1944
- Commissioned: 19 July 1944
- Decommissioned: 24 October 1946
- Recommissioned: 25 May 1951
- Decommissioned: 26 February 1959
- Stricken: 1 July 1972
- Fate: Sunk as target off Puerto Rico 6 March 1974

General characteristics
- Class & type: John C. Butler-class destroyer escort
- Displacement: 1,350 long tons (1,372 t)
- Length: 306 ft (93 m)
- Beam: 36 ft 8 in (11.18 m)
- Draft: 9 ft 5 in (2.87 m)
- Propulsion: two boilers, two geared turbine engines, 12,000 shp (8,900 kW); two propellers
- Speed: 24 knots (44 km/h; 28 mph)
- Range: 6,000 nmi (11,000 km; 6,900 mi) at 12 kn (22 km/h; 14 mph)
- Complement: 14 officers, 201 enlisted
- Armament: 2 × single 5 in (127 mm) guns; 2 × twin 40 mm (1.6 in) AA guns; 10 × single 20 mm (0.79 in) AA guns; 1 × triple 21 in (533 mm) torpedo tubes; 8 × depth charge throwers; 1 × Hedgehog ASW mortar; 2 × depth charge racks

USS Kenneth M. Willett (DE-354) was a John C. Butler-class destroyer escort acquired by the U.S. Navy during World War II. The primary purpose of the destroyer escort was to escort and protect ships in convoy, in addition to other tasks as assigned, such as patrol or radar picket.

== Namesake ==
Kenneth Martin Willett was born on 9 April 1919 in Overland, Missouri. He enlisted in the Naval Reserve as an apprentice seaman on 9 July 1940. Appointed to the Naval Reserve Midshipmen's School, he was commissioned as an ensign and assigned to the USS California, where he served until November 1941. He then reported to the 12th Naval District for duty at the Armed Guard Center, San Francisco, California, in January 1942. While serving as commanding officer of the Naval Armed Guard on board the freighter SS Stephen Hopkins, he was promoted to Lieutenant (j.g.) on 15 June.

While en route from Cape Town, South Africa to Paramaribo, Dutch Guiana, his freighter was attacked on 27 September 1942 by two Kriegsmarine surface raiders. Though seriously wounded by one of the first enemy shells, he manned the 4-inch gun and fired shell after shell into the nearer, more heavily armed raider. Inflicting heavy damage on both enemy ships, his accurate fire eventually sank the Stier. Even after an exploding magazine silenced his gun, he refused to give up his struggle for both ship and crew. When last seen, although weakened and suffering, he was helping to launch life rafts from the flaming freighter in an effort to save lives. He was posthumously awarded the Navy Cross.

== Construction and commissioning ==
The ship was launched on 7 March 1944 by Consolidated Steel Corp. at their yard in Orange, Texas, sponsored by Mrs. D. C. Willett, mother of Lt. (j.g.) Willett. The destroyer escort was commissioned on 19 July 1944 at Orange.

== History ==
=== World War II ===
After shakedown and training off Bermuda, Kenneth M. Willett served as a training ship in the Chesapeake Bay from 1 to 20 October. Joining CortDiv 82, she departed Norfolk, Virginia, 21 October for duty in the Pacific with the U.S. 7th Fleet. Steaming via the Panama Canal, the Galápagos Islands, and the New Hebrides, she reached Hollandia, New Guinea, 28 November.

Assigned to convoy escort duty between Humboldt Bay, New Guinea, and Leyte Gulf, Philippines, Kenneth M. Willett made seven trips from 13 December 1944 to 25 February 1945. On 1 January 1945, while she screened a convoy to Hollandia, Kenneth H. Willett's guns brought down an attacking enemy torpedo plane close aboard one of the merchant ships.

Upon arriving Leyte Gulf 25 February, the destroyer escort was assigned to patrol and ASW duty. Steaming to Mangarin Bay, Mindoro, 6 March, she made hunter-killer patrols off Mindoro and Luzon, then returned to Leyte Gulf 4 June for escort duty between Leyte and Ulithi, Western Carolines. After two runs to Ulithi, she resumed patrol duty off Mindoro 2 July; and on the 10th she returned to Leyte for a convoy escort run to Okinawa.

Departing 17 July with a convoy of LCIs and LSTs, Kenneth M. Willett steamed via Casiguran Bay, Luzon, for the Ryūkyūs. After safely passing through a typhoon 30 to 31 July, the convoy reached Okinawa 7 August. Kenneth M. Willett departed the next day for Leyte. During the next 16 weeks she made convoy runs out of Leyte and Manila to Ulithi, Tokyo, and Shanghai. And from 29 December to 29 January 1946 she operated out of Guiuan Roadstead, Samar, on intermittent weather patrols east of Leyte Gulf.

Steaming to Manila 10 February, Kenneth M. Willett cleared the bay 15 February for patrol duty along the Chinese coast. She arrived Qingdao 20 February with five other destroyer escorts and commenced operations from the Yellow Sea to Shanghai in support of Chinese Nationalists' efforts to wrest control of the northern China from the Communists. Following ASW operations in the North Yellow Sea 1 to 5 April, she departed Qingdao 15 April en route to the United States. Steaming via Guam, Eniwetok, and Pearl Harbor, she arrived San Pedro, Los Angeles, 11 May. She decommissioned 24 October and entered the Pacific Reserve Fleet at San Diego, California, 10 November.

=== Korean War operations ===
During the Korean War Kenneth M. Willett recommissioned 25 May 1951 at San Diego. After shakedown along the California coast, she departed San Diego 4 September and steamed via the Panama Canal en route to New Orleans, Louisiana, where she arrived 18 September for duty as a Naval Reserve training ship. Assigned to the 8th Naval District, she departed 5 November on a Naval Reserve cruise to San Juan, Puerto Rico. From then until 16 October 1958 she made 63 training cruises that carried her from New Orleans to South America, Canada, the eastern seaboard of the United States, and throughout the Caribbean. During this time she rendered vitally important service, making certain that men of the Naval Reserve remained qualified to serve on a moment's notice to guard the nation's security on the high seas.

=== Final decommissioning ===
Upon her arrival from Havana, Cuba, 16 October 1958 Kenneth M. Willett completed her final training cruise. She departed New Orleans 30 November, arriving Orange, Texas, the following day. She then was painted, all equipment was made operational and closed up and sealed and was decommissioned 26 February 1959. Assigned to the Atlantic Reserve Fleet, she was berthed at Philadelphia, Pennsylvania. On 1 July 1972 she was struck from the Navy List, and, on 6 March 1974, she was sunk as a target off the coast of Puerto Rico.
