= Krim-class cargo liner =

Class overview
- Operators: Black Sea State Shipping Company
- Subclasses: Abkhazia
- In service: 1928–1966
- Completed: 6
- Lost: 4
- Scrapped: 2

General characteristics as per MS Krim
- Type: Ocean liner
- Tonnage: 4,867 gross register tons (GRT); 2,683 net register tons (NRT); 1,520 tons deadweight (DWT)
- Length: 115.9 m (380 ft 2 in)
- Beam: 15.6 m (51 ft 1 in)
- Draught: 5.8 m (19 ft)
- Depth: 7.7 m (25.3 ft)
- Decks: 2
- Installed power: 1,163 nhp
- Propulsion: 2 screw propellers; 2 diesel engines
- Speed: 13 or 15 knots (24 or 28 km/h; 15 or 17 mph)
- Capacity: 450 passengers

The Krim-class ocean liners consisted of six ships built during the late 1920s for service in the Black Sea. The first two ships were built in Germany, but the rest were built in the Soviet Union. Four ships were sunk during the Second World War, while the other two survived the war.

== Background ==
In 1928 the Sovtorgflot (Soviet Commercial Fleet) ordered two ships from the Friedrich Krupp Germaniawerft shipyard in Kiel, Germany and procured a license to build four more at the Baltic Works in Leningrad. The latter ships were virtually identical with their half-sisters, but differed slightly in some respects. The Krim-class ships were intended for service in the Black Sea with the Black Sea State Shipping Company.

== Description ==
The German-built ships, MS Krim and MS Gruziya, had an overall length of 115.9 metres (380 ft 2 in), with a beam of 15.6 metres (51 ft 1 in) and a draught of 5.8 metres (19 ft). They had two decks and a depth of hold of 7.7 metres (25.3 ft). The ships were assessed at 4,867 gross register tons (GRT), 2,683 net register tons (NRT), and 1,520 tons deadweight (DWT). Krim and Gruziya had a pair of six-cylinder, two-stroke diesel engines, each driving a screw propeller, and the engines were rated at a total of 1,163 nominal horsepower. Sources differ about their maximum speed, quoting speeds of 13 knots (24 km/h; 15 mph) or 15 knots (28 km/h; 17 mph). The ship had a designed capacity of 450 passengers.

== Ships ==
Construction and service data
Name	Builder	Construction	Fate
MS Abkhazia	Baltic Works, Leningrad	1928	Sunk by German aircraft, 10 June 1942
MS Adzharistan	Baltic Works, Leningrad	1928	Sunk by German aircraft, 23 July 1941
MS Armenia	Baltic Works, Leningrad	1928	Sunk by a German torpedo bomber, 7 November 1941
MS Gruziya	Friedrich Krupp Germaniawerft, Kiel, Germany	1928	Sunk by German aircraft, 13 June 1942
MS Krim	Friedrich Krupp Germaniawerft, Kiel, Germany	1928	Converted into a training ship, 1966
MS Ukraina	Baltic Works, Leningrad	1928	Sunk by German aircraft, 2 July 1942

== Service ==
After completion, they were assigned to the Black Sea State Shipping Company with their port of registry at Odessa.

== Bibliography ==
- Bollinger, Martin J. (2012). From the Revolution to the Cold War: A History of the Soviet Merchant Fleet from 1917 to 1950. Windsor, UK: World Ship Society. ISBN 978-0-9560769-4-6.
- Budzbon, Przemysław; Radziemski, Jan & Twardowski, Marek (2022). Warships of the Soviet Fleets 1939–1945. Vol. III: Naval Auxiliaries. Barnsley, UK: Seaforth Publishing. ISBN 978-1-3990-2281-1.
- Jordan, Roger W. (1999). The World's Merchant Fleets, 1939: The Particulars and Wartime Fates of 6,000 ships. London: Chatham Publishing. ISBN 1-86176-023-X.
- Forczyk, Robert (2014). Where the Iron Crosses Grow: The Crimea 1941-44. Oxford, UK. ISBN 978-1-78200-625-1.
- Rohwer, Jürgen (2005). Chronology of the War at Sea 1939–1945: The Naval History of World War Two (Third Revised ed.). Annapolis, Maryland: Naval Institute Press. ISBN 1-59114-119-2.
- Wilson, Edward A. (1978). Soviet Passenger Ships, 1917–1977. Kendal, UK: World Ship Society. ISBN 0-905617-04-5.
