= Action of 6 June 1942 =

Naval battle during the Second World War

Coordinates: 8°40′57″S 26°26′5″W

- Part of the Battle of the Atlantic of World War II
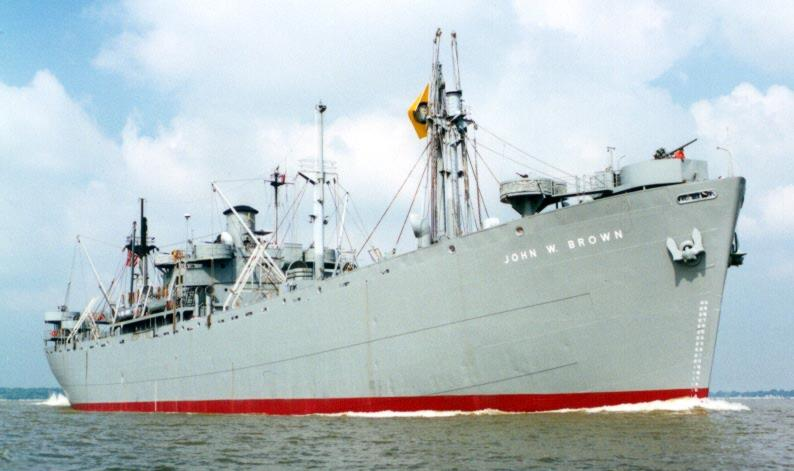
- A liberty ship of the same type as the SS Stanvac Calcutta
Date	6 June 1942
Location	Off Recife, Atlantic Ocean
Result	German victory

Belligerents
Germany	United States

Commanders and leaders
Horst Gerlach	Gustav Karlsson †; Edward Anderson

Strength
1 Auxiliary cruiser	1 Liberty ship

Casualties and losses
2 wounded Auxiliary cruiser damaged	17 killed 14 wounded 37 captured Liberty ship sunk

The action of 6 June 1942 was a single ship action fought during World War II. The German raider Stier encountered and sank the American tanker SS Stanvac Calcutta while cruising in the South Atlantic Ocean off Brazil.

== Background ==
Stanvac Calcutta was a 10,170 ton tanker with a crew of forty-two merchant mariners and nine armed guards aboard. The ship was commanded by Gustav O. Karlsson and the guards by Ensign Edward L. Anderson. Throughout World War II merchant ships were lightly armed and out of the six to be attacked by German raiders, only Stanvac Calcutta and Stephen Hopkins offered serious resistance and both were sunk. When Ensign Anderson was assigned to the ship he was responsible for finding armaments and it proved to be difficult. Anderson acquired one 4-inch (102 mm)/50-caliber naval gun salvaged from World War I and a 5 in (127 mm)/25-caliber anti-aircraft gun from the same era to arm his ship. Stier was heavily armed, she was under the command of Captain Horst Gerlach and mounted six 150-millimetre (6 in) guns, one 37 mm (1.5 in) gun, two 20 mm (0.79 in) cannons and two torpedo tubes. Captain Karlsson left Montevideo on 29 May 1942 headed north along the coast for Caripito, Venezuela.

== Action ==
A week after leaving Montevideo at 10:12 am on 6 June, the American ship was 500 miles (800 km) east of Pernambuco, Brazil; weather was overcast and the sea rough. Suddenly gunfire was heard and the Americans observed Stier sailing out of a squall and quickly heading towards Stanvac Calcutta almost head on and signaling the Americans to cut their engines. The Germans apparently believed the tanker was an unarmed merchantman. Beforehand Captain Karlsson and Ensign Anderson had planned a course of action for defending the vessel. As soon as the Germans were spotted, Stanvac Calcutta turned to the side to bring her guns to bear and when the raider closed to an estimated 3,500 yards (3,200 m), Ensign Anderson ordered his gunners to open fire. In succession the armed guards fired five shots with the aft 4-inch gun and several rounds of the bow anti-aircraft gun. The last of the five shells struck and disabled a 150 mm gun aboard Stier just before it began delivering broadsides of four cannons and machine gun fire.

Merchant sailors were trained and used to man the anti-aircraft gun; it fired continually throughout the battle though it misfired a few times because of old ammunition. In fifteen minutes of fighting, the Stanvac Calcutta was struck several times in the bridge and elsewhere, killing Captain Karlsson and a few other men. After hitting the Stier, the guards manning the 4-inch gun were reported to have been encouraged and continued firing accurately until shrapnel damaged their weapon. The sights were destroyed but the Americans continued shooting until the ammunition on deck was exhausted. At this time Ensign Anderson ordered two men to retrieve more ammunition from below deck, though as soon as they left, Captain Gerlach maneuvered his ship for a torpedo attack. When lined up, Stier fired one torpedo and it dove into the water and headed straight for Stanvac Calcutta where it detonated on the port side. Water began flowing in and the vessel started listing. A number of additional men were killed in the torpedo explosion and when it was clear that the American ship could not be saved, Ensign Anderson ordered the survivors to abandon ship and he began to lower life rafts.

While operating the crank, Anderson was hit in the back by a piece of shrapnel, paralyzing his legs, but he continued to lower the boat and after looking around to see if anybody else needed help, the ensign slipped over the side into an oil slick. With a broken leg, Anderson swam over to a wounded officer in the water and attempted to pull him to one of the life rafts but the man died of his wound first, and a few moments later the Germans lowered boats and began rescuing the Americans. The Germans fired 148 shells and one torpedo while Stanvac Calcutta fired only twenty-five; hundreds of machine gun rounds were also expended by both sides.

== Aftermath ==
Sixteen merchant sailors and armed guards were killed in action, thirty-seven prisoners were taken, of whom fourteen were wounded, one armed guard died later aboard Stier. Two Germans were wounded and Stier continued raiding for 4 months, sinking only two more ships before being sunk by the Liberty ship SS Stephen Hopkins in a mutually-destructive battle. SS Stanvac Calcutta was one of the few World War II merchant ships to be awarded the Merchant Marine Gallant Ship Citation. Ensign Anderson was promoted to the rank of lieutenant commander before leaving the navy sometime after the war. The American prisoners were eventually turned over to the Japanese.

== See also ==
- Pacific War
- Battle of the Mediterranean
