= Sinking of the SS Stephen Hopkins =

World War II Liberty ship of the United States

Coordinates: 28°12′53″S 11°55′6″W

Action of 27 September 1942
- Part of World War II
Date	September 27, 1942
Location	off Surinam, Atlantic Ocean
Result	Mutually destructive engagement

Belligerents
United States	Nazi Germany

Commanders and leaders
Paul Buck †	(Nazi Germany) Horst Gerlach

Strength
Liberty ship Stephen Hopkins	Auxiliary cruiser Stier; Supply ship Tannenfels

Casualties and losses
42 killed Stephen Hopkins sunk	2 killed Stier scuttled Tannenfels lightly damaged

- Picture of Stephen Hopkins at her launch.

History
- Name: Stephen Hopkins
- Namesake: Stephen Hopkins
- Builder: Permanente Metals Corporation
- Launched: May 1942
- Fate: Sunk in battle September 27, 1942

General characteristics
- Class & type: Liberty ship
- Tonnage: 7,181 GRT
- Length: 441.5 ft (135 m)
- Beam: 57 ft (17 m)
- Draught: 27.75 ft (8 m)
- Propulsion: triple expansion, 2,500 ihp (1,900 kW)
- Speed: 11 knots (20 km/h; 13 mph)
- Armament: 1 × 4 in (102 mm)/50 caliber gun (Mark 9) 2 × 37 mm cannon; 6 machine guns

SS Stephen Hopkins was a United States Merchant Marine Liberty ship that served in World War II. She was the only US merchant vessel to sink a German surface combatant during the war.

Steamship Stephen Hopkins was built at the Permanente Metals Corporation (Kaiser) shipyards in Richmond, California. Her namesake was Stephen Hopkins, a Founding Father and signer of the Declaration of Independence from Rhode Island. She was operated by Luckenbach Steamship Company under charter with the Maritime Commission and War Shipping Administration.

== Action of 27 September 1942 ==
She completed her first cargo run, but never made it home. On September 27, 1942, en route from Cape Town to Surinam, she encountered the heavily armed German commerce raider Stier and her tender Tannenfels. Because of fog, the ships were only 2 miles (3.2 km) apart when they sighted each other.

Ordered to stop, Stephen Hopkins refused to surrender, and Stier opened fire. Although greatly outgunned, the crew of Stephen Hopkins fought back, replacing the Armed Guard crew of the ship's lone 4-inch (102 mm) gun with volunteers as they fell. The fight was fierce and short, and by its end both ships were wrecks.

Stephen Hopkins sank at 10:00. Stier, too heavily damaged to continue her voyage, was scuttled by its crew less than two hours later. Most of the crew of Stephen Hopkins died, including Captain Paul Buck. The 15 survivors drifted on a lifeboat for a month before reaching shore in Brazil.

Captain Buck was posthumously awarded the Merchant Marine Distinguished Service Medal for his actions. So was US Merchant Marine Academy cadet Edwin Joseph O'Hara, who single-handedly fired the last shots from the ship's 4-inch gun. Navy reservist Lt. (j.g.) Kenneth Martin Willett, commander of the Armed Guard detachment which manned the ship's 4-inch gun, was posthumously awarded the Navy Cross.

The Liberty ships SS Paul Buck, SS Edwin Joseph O'Hara, and SS Richard Moczkowski, and the destroyer escort USS Kenneth M. Willett were named in honor of crew members of Stephen Hopkins, and SS Stephen Hopkins II in honor of the ship itself.

== Recognition ==
- O'Hara Hall, the gymnasium facility at the United States Merchant Marine Academy, is named in honor of Midshipman O'Hara.
- Captain Paul Buck, master of SS Stephen Hopkins, was posthumously awarded the Merchant Marine Distinguished Service Medal by the President of the United States "for determination to fight his ship and his perseverance in engaging the enemy to the utmost until his ship was rendered helpless". The award was given by Admiral Emory S. Land.
- George S. Cronk, Second Engineer on the ship, sailed his lifeboat 2,200 miles for 31 days to save his shipmates. He was given the Merchant Marine Distinguished Service Medal by the President of the United States. The award was given by Admiral Emory S. Land.
- SS Stephen Hopkins was awarded the Gallant Ship Award for outstanding courage against overpowering odds by the U.S. Department of Transportation, Maritime Administration.

== See also ==
- Action of 6 June 1942
