= MS Krim =

History
- Name: Krim
- Namesake: Crimea
- Owner: Black Sea State Shipping Company
- Port of registry: Odessa, Soviet Union
- Builder: Friedrich Krupp Germaniawerft, Kiel
- Completed: 1928
- In service: 1928
- Reclassified: as a training ship, 1966

General characteristics
- Class & type: Krim-class cargo liner
- Tonnage: 4,800 gross register tons (GRT); 2,583 net register tons (NRT); 1,480 tons deadweight (DWT)
- Displacement: 6,050 t (5,950 long tons) (deep load)
- Length: 115.85 m (380 ft 1 in)
- Beam: 15.55 m (51 ft)
- Draught: 5.7 m (18 ft 8 in)
- Depth: 7.7 m (25.3 ft)
- Decks: 2
- Installed power: 4,000 hp (3,000 kW)
- Propulsion: 2 screw propellers; 2 diesel engines
- Speed: 13.6 knots (25.2 km/h; 15.7 mph)
- Capacity: 518 passengers

MS Krim was the lead ship of her class of six cargo liners built for the Soviet Union in the late 1920s. The ship was the sole ship of her class to survive the Second World War. She was converted into a training ship in 1966.

== Description ==
Krim had an overall length of 115.9 metres (380 ft 2 in), with a beam of 15.6 metres (51 ft 1 in) and a draught of 5.8 metres (19 ft). She had two decks and a depth of hold of 7.7 metres (25.3 ft). The ship was assessed at 4,867 gross register tons (GRT), 2,689 net register tons (NRT), and 1,520 tons deadweight (DWT). She had a pair of six-cylinder, two-stroke diesel engines, each driving a screw propeller, and the engines were rated at a total of 1,163 nominal horsepower. Sources differ about her maximum speed, quoting speeds of 13 knots (24 km/h; 15 mph) or 15 knots (28 km/h; 17 mph). The ship had a designed capacity of 450 passengers.

== Construction and career ==
Krim was one of the two ships in the class that was constructed in 1928 at the Friedrich Krupp Germaniawerft shipyard in Kiel, Germany. After completion the ship was assigned to the Black Sea State Shipping Company by Sovtorgflot with its port of registry at Odessa.

== Bibliography ==
- Bollinger, Martin J. (2012). From the Revolution to the Cold War: A History of the Soviet Merchant Fleet from 1917 to 1950. Windsor, UK: World Ship Society. ISBN 978-0-9560769-4-6.
- Budzbon, Przemysław; Radziemski, Jan & Twardowski, Marek (2022). Warships of the Soviet Fleets 1939–1945. Vol. III: Naval Auxiliaries. Barnsley, UK: Seaforth Publishing. ISBN 978-1-3990-2281-1.
- Jordan, Roger W. (1999). The World's Merchant Fleets, 1939: The Particulars and Wartime Fates of 6,000 ships. London: Chatham Publishing. ISBN 1-86176-023-X.
- Wilson, Edward A. (1978). Soviet Passenger Ships, 1917–1977. Kendal, UK: World Ship Society. ISBN 0-905617-04-5.
