= MS Abkhazia =

Soviet Krim-class cargo liner

History
- Name: Abkhazia
- Owner: Black Sea State Shipping Company
- Port of registry: Odessa, Soviet Union
- Builder: Baltic Works, Leningrad
- Completed: 1928
- In service: 1928
- Fate: Sunk by German aircraft, 10 June 1942

General characteristics
- Class & type: Krim-class cargo liner
- Tonnage: 4,727 gross register tons (GRT); 2,583 net register tons (NRT); 1,480 tons deadweight (DWT)
- Displacement: 5,770 t (5,680 long tons) (deep load)
- Length: 112.15 m (367 ft 11 in)
- Beam: 15.55 m (51 ft)
- Draught: 5.95 m (19 ft 6 in)
- Depth: 7.7 m (25.3 ft)
- Decks: 2
- Installed power: 3,900 hp (2,900 kW)
- Propulsion: 2 screw propellers; 2 diesel engines
- Speed: 12.6 knots (23.3 km/h; 14.5 mph)
- Capacity: 518 passengers

MS Abkhazia was one of six Soviet Krim-class cargo liners during the late 1920s built for the Black Sea State Shipping Company. During the Second World War, she participated in the Siege of Odessa in 1941 and the Siege of Sevastopol in 1942. She was sunk by German aircraft in the port in June.

== Description ==
The four ships built in Leningrad were shorter than the pair built in Germany, but had more powerful engines. Abkhazia had an overall length of 110.6 metres (363 ft), with a beam of 15.5 metres (51 ft) and a draught of 5.8 metres (19 ft). She had two decks and a depth of hold of 7.7 metres (25.3 ft). The ship was assessed at 4,727 gross register tons (GRT), 2,583 net register tons (NRT), and 1,600 tons deadweight (DWT). She had a pair of six-cylinder, two-stroke diesel engines, each driving a screw propeller, and the engines were rated at a total of 1,372 nominal horsepower. Sources differ about her maximum speed, quoting speeds of 13 knots (24 km/h; 15 mph) or 15 knots (28 km/h; 17 mph). The ship had a designed capacity of 450 passengers.

== Construction and career ==
Abkhazia was one of the four ships in the class that were constructed in 1928 at the Baltic Works shipyard in Leningrad. After completion the ship was assigned to the Black Sea State Shipping Company by Sovtorgflot with its port of registry at Odessa.

After the invasion of the Soviet Union on 22 June 1941 (Operation Barbarossa) by Nazi Germany and its allies, Abkhazia was used for military tasks. On 16–21 September, she served as a troopship ferrying part of the 157th Rifle Division from Novorossiysk to Odessa. A day after commencing the voyage, the convoy of which she was a part was fruitlessly attacked by German aircraft. The division was evacuated from Odessa to Sevastopol in several convoys between 3 and 6 October with the ship ferrying her portion of the division on 5 October. Abkhazia arrived in Odessa on 14 October to begin loading the city's defenders and reached Sevastopol on the 16th without damage despite repeated German air attacks.

The liner transported elements of the 386th Rifle Division from Novorossiyk to Sevastopol on 1–5 January 1942 and made another trip at the beginning of March. Abkhazia arrived in the besieged port with supplies on 2 April, followed by another trip on 10 April. Together with the destroyer Svobodny, the ship delivered 1,958 men, 209 tons of fuel and 348 tons of supplies on 21 May. At the beginning of June, Abkhazia was part of a convoy that brought 2,785 troops to reinforce the garrison and evacuated 487 wounded men and 722 civilians on the return voyage. On the night of 9/10 June, Abkhazia was part of a convoy bound for Sevastopol that was unsuccessfully attacked by Heinkel He 111 torpedo bombers from the Second Group of Bomber Wing 26 (II./Kampfgeschwader 26). The following morning the ship was set on fire by bombs delivered by the First Group of Bomber Wing 100 (I./Kampfgeschwader 100). An attack 10 minutes later by Junkers Ju 87 dive bombers caused the liner to roll over against the adjacent pier. She remained on fire until her cargo of ammunition finally exploded around 22:00.

== Bibliography ==
- Bollinger, Martin J. (2012). From the Revolution to the Cold War: A History of the Soviet Merchant Fleet from 1917 to 1950. Windsor, UK: World Ship Society. ISBN 978-0-9560769-4-6.
- Budzbon, Przemysław; Radziemski, Jan & Twardowski, Marek (2022). Warships of the Soviet Fleets 1939–1945. Vol. III: Naval Auxiliaries. Barnsley, UK: Seaforth Publishing. ISBN 978-1-3990-2281-1.
- Jordan, Roger W. (1999). The World's Merchant Fleets, 1939: The Particulars and Wartime Fates of 6,000 ships. London: Chatham Publishing. ISBN 1-86176-023-X.
- Forczyk, Robert (2014). Where the Iron Crosses Grow: The Crimea 1941-44. Oxford, UK: Osprey Publishing. ISBN 978-1-78200-625-1.
- Rohwer, Jürgen (2005). Chronology of the War at Sea 1939–1945: The Naval History of World War Two (Third Revised ed.). Annapolis, Maryland: Naval Institute Press. ISBN 1-59114-119-2.
- Wilson, Edward A. (1978). Soviet Passenger Ships, 1917–1977. Kendal, UK: World Ship Society. ISBN 0-905617-04-5.
