= MS Ukraina =

Soviet ocean liner

History
- Name: Ukraina
- Owner: Black Sea State Shipping Company
- Port of registry: Odessa, Soviet Union
- Builder: Baltic Works, Leningrad
- Completed: 1928
- In service: 1928
- Fate: Sunk by German aircraft, 2 July 1942

General characteristics
- Class & type: Krim-class cargo liner
- Tonnage: 4,727 gross register tons (GRT); 2,583 net register tons (NRT); 1,480 tons deadweight (DWT)
- Displacement: 5,770 t (5,680 long tons) (deep load)
- Length: 112.15 m (367 ft 11 in)
- Beam: 15.55 m (51 ft)
- Draught: 5.95 m (19 ft 6 in)
- Depth: 7.7 m (25.3 ft)
- Decks: 2
- Installed power: 3,900 hp (2,900 kW)
- Propulsion: 2 screw propellers; 2 diesel engines
- Speed: 12.6 knots (23.3 km/h; 14.5 mph)
- Capacity: 518 passengers

MS Ukraina was one of six Soviet Krim-class ocean liners during the late 1920s built for the Black Sea State Shipping Company. During the Second World War, she participated in the Siege of Odessa in 1941 and the Siege of Sevastopol in 1942. She was sunk by German aircraft in July.

== Description ==
The four ships built in Leningrad were shorter than the pair built in Germany, but had more powerful engines. Ukraina had an overall length of 110.6 metres (363 ft), with a beam of 15.5 metres (51 ft) and a draught of 5.8 metres (19 ft). She had two decks and a depth of hold of 7.7 metres (25.3 ft). The ship was assessed at 4,727 gross register tons (GRT), 2,566 net register tons (NRT), and 1,600 tons deadweight (DWT). She had a pair of six-cylinder, two-stroke diesel engines, each driving a screw propeller, and the engines were rated at a total of 1,374 nominal horsepower. Sources differ about her maximum speed, quoting speeds of 13 knots (24 km/h; 15 mph) or 15 knots (28 km/h; 17 mph). The ship had a designed capacity of 450 passengers.

== Construction and career ==
Ukraina was one of the four ships in the class that were constructed in 1928 at the Baltic Works shipyard in Leningrad. After completion the ship was assigned to the Black Sea State Shipping Company by Sovtorgflot with its port of registry at Odessa.

After the invasion of the Soviet Union on 22 June 1941 (Operation Barbarossa) by Nazi Germany and its allies, Ukraina was used for military tasks. The ship arrived in Odessa on 14 October to begin loading the city's defenders and reached Sevastopol on the 16th without damage despite repeated German air attacks.

Ukraina was sunk by German bombers of the First Group of Bomber Wing 76 (I./Kampfgeschwader 76) in Novorossiysk harbour on 2 July 1942.

== Bibliography ==
- Bollinger, Martin J. (2012). From the Revolution to the Cold War: A History of the Soviet Merchant Fleet from 1917 to 1950. Windsor, UK: World Ship Society. ISBN 978-0-9560769-4-6.
- Budzbon, Przemysław; Radziemski, Jan & Twardowski, Marek (2022). Warships of the Soviet Fleets 1939–1945. Vol. III: Naval Auxiliaries. Barnsley, UK: Seaforth Publishing. ISBN 978-1-3990-2281-1.
- Jordan, Roger W. (1999). The World's Merchant Fleets, 1939: The Particulars and Wartime Fates of 6,000 ships. London: Chatham Publishing. ISBN 1-86176-023-X.
- Rohwer, Jürgen (2005). Chronology of the War at Sea 1939–1945: The Naval History of World War Two (Third Revised ed.). Annapolis, Maryland: Naval Institute Press. ISBN 1-59114-119-2.
- Wilson, Edward A. (1978). Soviet Passenger Ships, 1917–1977. Kendal, UK: World Ship Society. ISBN 0-905617-04-5.
