= MS Adzharistan =

Soviet cargo liner (1930–1941)

History
- Name: Adzharistan
- Owner: Black Sea State Shipping Company
- Port of registry: Odessa, Soviet Union
- Builder: Baltic Works, Leningrad
- Launched: 1928
- Completed: 1930
- In service: 1930
- Fate: Destroyed by German aircraft, 23 July 1941

General characteristics
- Class & type: Krim-class cargo liner
- Tonnage: 4,727 gross register tons (GRT); 2,583 net register tons (NRT); 1,480 tons deadweight (DWT)
- Displacement: 5,770 t (5,680 long tons) (deep load)
- Length: 112.15 m (367 ft 11 in)
- Beam: 15.55 m (51 ft)
- Draught: 5.95 m (19 ft 6 in)
- Depth: 7.7 m (25.3 ft)
- Decks: 2
- Installed power: 3,900 hp (2,900 kW)
- Propulsion: 2 screw propellers; 2 diesel engines
- Speed: 12.6 knots (23.3 km/h; 14.5 mph)
- Capacity: 518 passengers

MS Adzharistan was one of six Soviet Krim-class cargo liners built for the Black Sea State Shipping Company during the late 1920s. The first pair were built in Weimar Germany, but the other four, including Adzharistan, were built in the Soviet Union and varied slightly from the German-built ships. A month after the invasion of the Soviet Union by the Axis powers in June 1941, she was destroyed by German aircraft.

== Description ==
The Krim-class ships were built for the luxury tourist trade from the Black Sea to the Mediterranean. The four ships built at the Baltic Works in Leningrad were slightly shorter than the pair built in Germany and displaced a little less at 5,770 metric tons (5,680 long tons) at deep load. They had an overall length of 112.15 metres (367 ft 11 in), with a beam of 15.55 metres (51 ft) and a draught of 5.95 metres (19 ft 6 in). The Soviet-built ships had two decks and a depth of hold of 7.7 metres (25.3 ft).

The Krim-class cargo liners had 518 passenger berths in three classes plus room for an additional 462 passengers on the decks. They had a cargo capacity of 2,820 cubic metres (100,000 cu ft). The ships were assessed at 4,727 gross register tons (GRT), 2,583 net register tons (NRT), and 1,480 tons deadweight (DWT).

Adzharistan had a pair of six-cylinder, two-stroke diesel engines, each driving a propeller shaft. The Russki Diesel engines were rated at a total of 3,900 horsepower (2,900 kW) and gave the ship a speed of 12.6 knots (23.3 km/h; 14.5 mph)

== Construction and career ==
Adzharistan was originally named Adzharia and was renamed sometime in the 1930s. She was one of the four ships in the class that were constructed in 1928. After completion in 1930, the ship was assigned to its regional subsidiary, the Black Sea State Shipping Company by Sovtorgflot, the national merchant fleet, with its port of registry at Odessa.

After the invasion of the Soviet Union on 22 June 1941 (Operation Barbarossa) by Nazi Germany and its allies, Adzharistan was used for military tasks. After being damaged and set on fire by German aircraft on 23 July near Odessa, the liner was run aground and subsequently burnt out. The only German aircraft known to have attacked the Odessa area on that date were Heinkel He 111H bombers of II./Kampfgeschwader 27 (2nd Group, Bomber Wing 27).

== Bibliography ==
- Bernád, Dénes; Karlenko, Dmitriy & Roba, Jean-Louis (2007). From Barbarossa to Odessa: The Luftwaffe and Axis Allies Strike South-East, June-October 1941. Hinckley, UK: Midland. ISBN 978-1-85780-273-3.
- Bollinger, Martin J. (2012). From the Revolution to the Cold War: A History of the Soviet Merchant Fleet from 1917 to 1950. Windsor, UK: World Ship Society. ISBN 978-0-9560769-4-6.
- Budzbon, Przemysław; Radziemski, Jan & Twardowski, Marek (2022). Warships of the Soviet Fleets 1939–1945. Vol. III: Naval Auxiliaries. Barnsley, UK: Seaforth Publishing. ISBN 978-1-3990-2281-1.
- Jordan, Roger W. (1999). The World's Merchant Fleets, 1939: The Particulars and Wartime Fates of 6,000 ships. London: Chatham Publishing. ISBN 1-86176-023-X.
- Waiss, Walter (2003). Aus Dem Boelcke-Archiv 3 Chronik Kampfgeschwader Nr. 27 Boelcke Teil 2: 01.01.1941 - 31.12.1941. Neuss, Germany: Waiss. OCLC 1106565000.
