= Operation Hedge-hop =

Operation Hedge-hop was a World War II British Royal Air Force raid on a submarine engine factory located in Augsburg, Germany. The attack occurred on April 17, 1942, during daylight hours. The name Hedge-hop refers to the fact that the bombers that participated in the operation had to fly at very low altitudes and were exposed to a significant amount of enemy fire.

Despite the opposition, squadron leader John D. Nettleton and his crew persisted in their mission. The bombers flew mostly at 50 feet above the ground, reaching Augsburg and successfully bombing the factory despite being under point-blank fire.

The cost of the operation was steep, with only five of the original twelve Lancaster Bombers returning.

For their valour and skill, members of the raiding party received a series of prestigious awards, including one Distinguished Service Order (D.S.O.), eight Distinguished Flying Crosses (D.F.C.s), and ten Distinguished Flying Medals (D.F.M.s).

The "hedge-hop" tactic, while risky, showcased an innovative military strategy aimed at maximizing the element of surprise and minimizing the aircraft's exposure to enemy defences. The successful execution of this raid, despite the heavy losses, marked a significant achievement in the Allied bombing campaign.

The participants of Operation Hedge-Hop in Augsburg were honoured in April 1942, with squadron leader John Dering Nettleton receiving the Victoria Cross.

This operation has been depicted in several comics, including Warfront #18 (1951), Fighting Fronts #2 (1952), and War Battle's "Aces Low!".
