= United States Navy Armed Guard =

U.S. Navy crews on merchant ships in WWII

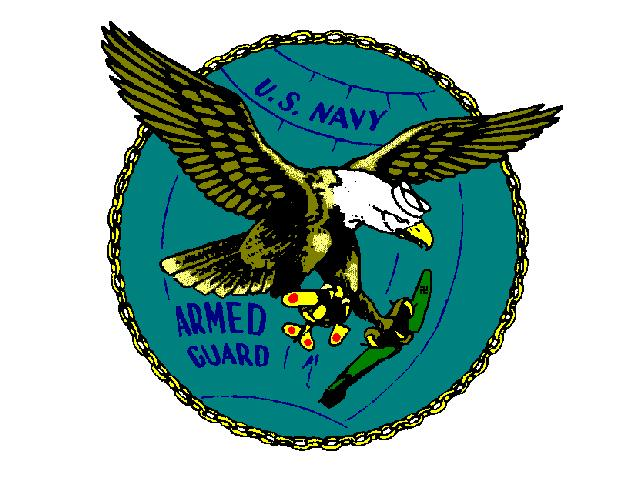
Insignia of the United States Armed Guard

The U.S. Navy Armed Guard was a force of United States Navy gunners and related personnel established during World War II to protect U.S. merchant shipping from enemy attack. A shortage of escort vessels to provide unarmed merchant vessels with adequate protection shifted the burden to onboard crews to help counter the constant danger presented by Axis submarines, surface raiders, fighter aircraft and bombers. The NAG was headquartered in New Orleans, and had three training centers, at Norfolk, Virginia; San Diego, California; and Gulfport, Mississippi. At the end of the war, there were 144,857 men serving in the Navy Armed Guard on 6,200 ships.

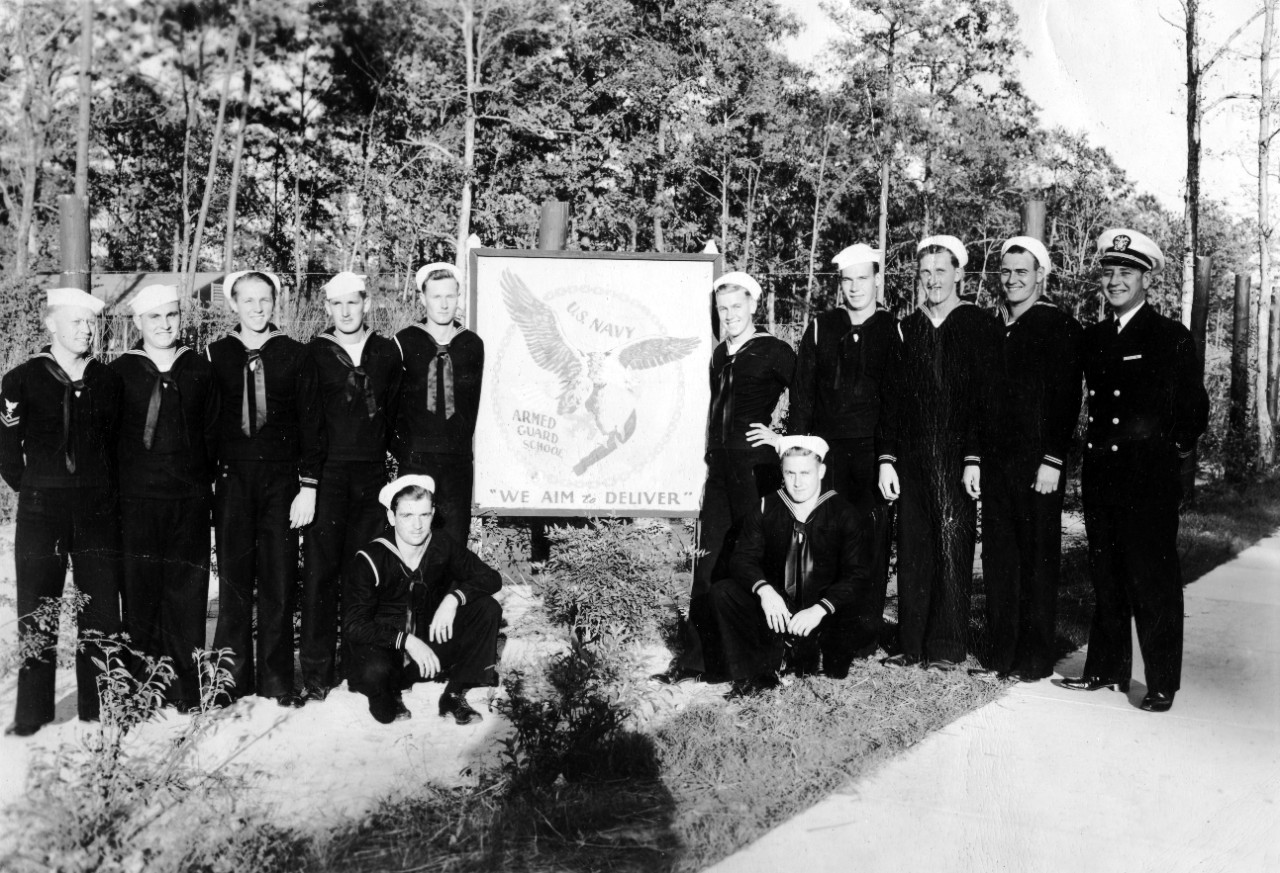
Navy Armed Guard Training Center

== Unit composition ==
The United States Navy Armed Guard (USNAG) were U.S. Navy gun crews consisting of Gunner's Mates, Coxswains, Boatswain's Mates, Radiomen, Signalmen, and an occasional Pharmacist's Mate serving at sea on merchant ships; toward the end of the war a few Radarmen joined the crews. The Armed Guard served on Allied merchant marine ships in every theater of the war. Initially, a shortage of trained officers found chiefs and even petty officers in command; later a single commissioned officer would be in charge.

The most common armament mounted on merchant ships were the MK II 20mm Oerlikon autocannon and the 3"/50, 4"/50, and 5"/38 deck guns.

== Duty ==
The assignment as an Armed Guardsman was often dreaded because of the constant danger. The important cargoes that merchant ships carried made them priority targets of enemy submarines and planes. Merchant ships were vulnerable, being slow and unwieldy, while lacking armor and having light firepower at best. Furthermore, merchant ships were among the last to receive updated equipment. Early on in the war, some ships only had a few machine guns, so the crews painted telephone poles to imitate the barrels of larger guns.

When practicable, the Navy Armed Guard aboard a merchant ship would provide cross-training to merchant crew members in the use of the guns in the event of casualties. The Navy Armed Guardsmen would typically sail round trip on the same ship, occasionally they would get a different assignment upon reaching their destination depending on Allied convoy schedules.

== In film ==
The 1943 film Action in the North Atlantic, featuring Humphrey Bogart, Raymond Massey, and Alan Hale, illustrates the importance of the Navy Armed Guard and how it interfaced with the Merchant Marine officers and crew.

== See also ==
- Action off Cape Bougaroun
- Battle of Point Judith
- Battle of the Atlantic
- Destroyer escort
- Kenneth Martin Willett
- Defensively equipped merchant ship
- SS Stephen Hopkins
- Convoy PQ 17
- Deck gun
- Liberty ship
- Victory ship
