= SS Tiger =

Sunken oil tanker (1917–1942)

Coordinates: 36°45′54″N 75°46′17″W

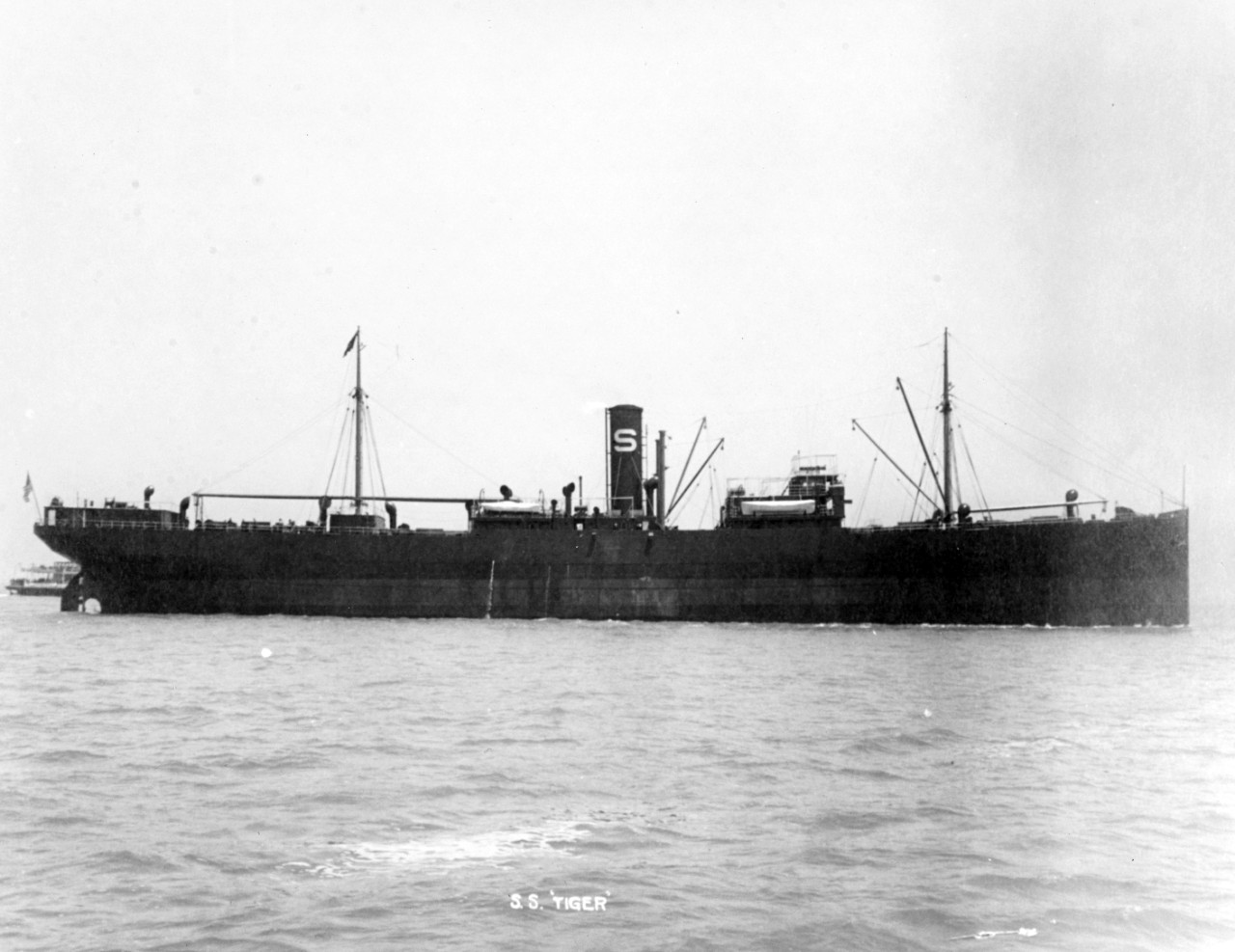
- Tiger between 1917 and 1918

History

United States
- Name: Tiger
- Owner: Standard Oil Co. (1917–1930); Socony-Vacuum Oil Co. (1930–1942)
- Operator: Standard Transportation Company (1920–1931); Standard-Vacuum Transportation Company (1931–1935); Socony-Vacuum Oil Co. (1935–1942)
- Builder: Union Iron Works, San Francisco
- Yard number: 137
- Launched: 21 April 1917
- Completed: June 1917
- Homeport: New York
- Identification: US Official Number 215248; Call sign LHKN (1918–1933); Call sign WSCY (1934–1942)
- Fate: Sank 2 April 1942

General characteristics
- Type: Tanker
- Tonnage: 6,274 GRT; 3,832 NRT
- Length: 410 ft 0 in (124.97 m)
- Beam: 56 ft 0 in (17.07 m)
- Depth: 29 ft 0 in (8.84 m)
- Installed power: 594 Nhp, 3,200 ihp
- Propulsion: Union Iron Works 3-cylinder triple expansion
- Speed: 10 1/2 knots (12.1 mph; 19.4 km/h)

SS Tiger was an American Socony-Vacuum Oil Company tanker completed in 1917 at San Francisco, California. Between 1918 and 1919, she was operated by the US Navy under the name USS Tiger (ID-1640).

Tiger was carrying 64,321 barrels (~8,775 t) of Navy fuel oil when the German submarine U-754 torpedoed her on 1 April 1942. The torpedo hit Tiger on her starboard side aft of amidships tank #5 and one crewman lost his life. She was taken in tow and sank on 2 April in 55 feet (17 m) of water in the Atlantic Ocean, 8.2 miles (13.2 km) east of Sandbridge Beach, Virginia. She lies on her starboard side, quite broken up, at a depth of 58 feet (18 m).
