= MS Gruziya =

History
- Name: Gruziya
- Owner: Black Sea State Shipping Company
- Port of registry: Odessa, Soviet Union
- Builder: Friedrich Krupp Germaniawerft, Kiel
- Completed: 1928
- In service: 1928
- Fate: Sunk by German aircraft, 13 June 1942

General characteristics
- Class & type: Krim-class ocean liner
- Tonnage: 4,857 gross register tons (GRT); 2,625 net register tons (NRT); 1,520 tons deadweight (DWT)
- Length: 115.9 m (380 ft 2 in)
- Beam: 15.6 m (51 ft 1 in)
- Draught: 5.8 m (19 ft)
- Depth: 7.7 m (25.3 ft)
- Decks: 2
- Installed power: 1,163 nhp
- Propulsion: 2 screw propellers; 2 diesel engines
- Speed: 13 or 15 knots (24 or 28 km/h; 15 or 17 mph)
- Capacity: 450 passengers

MS Gruziya was one of six Soviet Krim-class ocean liners during the late 1920s built for the Black Sea State Shipping Company. During the Second World War, she participated in the Siege of Odessa in 1941 and the Siege of Sevastopol in 1942. The ship was sunk by a German bomber en route to the latter port in June; there were no survivors.

== Description ==
Gruziya had an overall length of 115.9 metres (380 ft 2 in), with a beam of 15.6 metres (51 ft 1 in) and a draught of 5.8 metres (19 ft). She had two decks and a depth of hold of 7.7 metres (25.3 ft). The ship was assessed at 4,857 gross register tons (GRT), 2,661 net register tons (NRT), and 1,520 tons deadweight (DWT). She had a pair of six-cylinder, two-stroke diesel engines, each driving a screw propeller, and the engines were rated at a total of 1,163 nominal horsepower. Sources differ about her maximum speed, quoting speeds of 13 knots (24 km/h; 15 mph) or 15 knots (28 km/h; 17 mph). The ship had a designed capacity of 450 passengers.

== Construction and career ==
Gruziya was one of the two ships in the class that was constructed in 1928 at the Friedrich Krupp Germaniawerft shipyard in Kiel, Germany. After completion the ship was assigned to the Black Sea State Shipping Company by Sovtorgflot with its port of registry at Odessa.

After the invasion of the Soviet Union on 22 June 1941 (Operation Barbarossa) by Nazi Germany and its allies, Gruziya was used for military tasks. On 16–21 September, she served as a troopship ferrying part of the 157th Rifle Division from Novorossiysk to Odessa. A day after commencing the voyage, the convoy of which she was a part was fruitlessly attacked by German aircraft. The following month, the ship arrived in Odessa on 14 October in preparation to evacuate the city's defenders and was damaged by a German bomber. Gruziya loaded some troops and the convoy of which she was a part arrived at Sevastopol on the 16th despite repeated German air attacks.

After repairs were completed, the liner transported troops and supplies to the besieged garrison of Sevastopol on 18 and 20 May 1942 and evacuated wounded men on the return voyage. Gruziya and the destroyer Tashkent ferried 2,734 reinforcements to Sevastopol and returned 1,200 wounded on 28 May. Together with the minesweeper T-401/Tral and four patrol boats, the ship took 750 troops to Sevastopol and evacuated 850 wounded men and 724 civilians on 7 June.

On the night of 12/13 June, Gruziya was bound for Sevastopol with a cargo of ammunition on board that included chemical shells filled with Lewisite and mustard gas. Escorted by a pair of minesweepers, she was unsuccessfully attacked by Italian MAS boats. The following morning the convoy was attacked by German aircraft. One bomb landed in the aft cargo hold where all the ammunition was stored, detonating it. The resulting explosion blew the ship in half; there were no survivors.

== Bibliography ==
- Bollinger, Martin J. (2012). From the Revolution to the Cold War: A History of the Soviet Merchant Fleet from 1917 to 1950. Windsor, UK: World Ship Society. ISBN 978-0-9560769-4-6.
- Budzbon, Przemysław; Radziemski, Jan & Twardowski, Marek (2022). Warships of the Soviet Fleets 1939–1945. Vol. III: Naval Auxiliaries. Barnsley, UK: Seaforth Publishing. ISBN 978-1-3990-2281-1.
- Jordan, Roger W. (1999). The World's Merchant Fleets, 1939: The Particulars and Wartime Fates of 6,000 ships. London: Chatham Publishing. ISBN 1-86176-023-X.
- Forczyk, Robert (2014). Where the Iron Crosses Grow: The Crimea 1941-44. Oxford, UK. ISBN 978-1-78200-625-1.
- Rohwer, Jürgen (2005). Chronology of the War at Sea 1939–1945: The Naval History of World War Two (Third Revised ed.). Annapolis, Maryland: Naval Institute Press. ISBN 1-59114-119-2.
- Wilson, Edward A. (1978). Soviet Passenger Ships, 1917–1977. Kendal, UK: World Ship Society. ISBN 0-905617-04-5.
