= German auxiliary cruiser Stier =

World War II German auxiliary warship

Coordinates: 28°8′0″S 11°59′0″W

- Stier under way.

History

Germany
- Owner: Atlas Levant Line
- Builder: Germaniawerft
- Launched: 1936
- Christened: Cairo
- Fate: Requisitioned by Kriegsmarine, 1939

Nazi Germany
- Name: Stier
- Namesake: Taurus
- Operator: Kriegsmarine
- Recommissioned: 10 May 1942
- Renamed: Stier, 1939
- Reclassified: Auxiliary cruiser, 1939
- Nickname(s): HSK-6; Schiff 23; Raider J
- Fate: Scuttled in the South Atlantic, 27 September 1942

General characteristics
- Tonnage: 4,778 GRT
- Displacement: 11,000 tons
- Length: 134 m (440 ft)
- Beam: 17.3 m (57 ft)
- Draught: 7.2 m (24 ft)
- Propulsion: 1 × 7-cylinder diesel engine, 3,750 hp (2,796 kW)
- Speed: 14 knots (26 km/h; 16 mph)
- Range: 50,000 nmi (93,000 km; 58,000 mi) at 12 knots (22 km/h; 14 mph)
- Endurance: 173 days
- Complement: 324
- Armament: 6 × 15 cm (5.9 in) SK L/45; 1 × twin 3.7 cm (1.5 in) SK C/30; 4 × single 2 cm (0.79 in) C/30 guns; 2 × submerged 533 mm (21 in) torpedo tubes
- Aircraft carried: 2 × Arado Ar 231 floatplanes

Stier (HSK 6) was an auxiliary cruiser of Nazi Germany's Kriegsmarine during World War II. Her Kriegsmarine designation was Schiff 23, to the Royal Navy she was Raider J.

The name Stier means "bull" and also represents the Taurus constellation in the German language. She was the last German raider to break out into the Atlantic in World War II.

== Early history ==
Built by Germaniawerft in 1936 as the freighter Cairo, she was operated by the Atlas Levant Line (ALL) until being requisitioned for Kriegsmarine services in November 1939. After merchant warfare operations in the Baltic Sea, she was converted into a mine layer and was planned to be used during Operation Sea Lion. After this operation was canceled, the now renamed Stier was modified into an auxiliary cruiser in April 1941, first at the Wilton shipyard Rotterdam and later at Oderwerke, Stettin, and Kriegsmarinewerft, in Gotenhafen (Gdynia).

== Raiding voyage ==
On 10 May 1942 she left Germany for operations in the Atlantic. Moving by stages down the English Channel, and after an engagement with British coastal forces on the 13th which saw the loss of two torpedo boats (German) and one MTB (British), Stier reached Royan in occupied France on the 19th. From there she departed under the command of Fregattenkapitän (later Kapitän zur See) Horst Gerlach for operations in the South Atlantic. On a cruise of 4½ months she sank three ships. On 27 September 1942, she engaged and sank American cargo ship SS Stephen Hopkins, whose resistance inflicted so substantial damage that Stier had to be scuttled by her crew.

Stier sinking an allied merchant ship.

During her operation the Stier sank four ships, totalling 29,409 tons (GRT).

=== Final engagement ===
On 27 September 1942 Stier encountered the American Liberty ship Stephen Hopkins en route from Cape Town to Paramaribo.

Closing in foggy conditions, the two ships sighted each other around 08:52 AM at a distance of 4,000 yards. Gerlach sent his men to action stations; the master of the Stephen Hopkins was suspicious of the unidentified vessel and did the same. The Stephen Hopkins had a small defensive armament (1 × 4 inch gun astern, 2 x 37mm guns of an unknown model forward, and 6 x machine guns), but when firing commenced, around 08:55, she put up a spirited defense. She scored several hits on Stier, damaging her engines and steering gear. However, overwhelmed by fire from Stier, the Hopkins drifted away; by 10 a.m. she had sunk. Forty-two of her crew were killed in the action, and three more died later; the fifteen survivors finally reached Brazil 31 days later. Stephen Hopkins's commander, Captain Paul Buck, was posthumously awarded the Merchant Marine Distinguished Service Medal for his actions. So was United States Merchant Marine Academy cadet Edwin Joseph O'Hara, who single-handedly fired the last shots from the ship's 4-inch gun.

Stier possibly showing battle damage during battle with Stephen Hopkins (speculation based on picture contents).

Meanwhile, Stier had been heavily damaged: unable to make headway, and not responding to the helm. Gerlach made the decision to scuttle the ship and prevent her from falling into Allied hands. After the scuttling charges were exploded, Stier sank at 11:40 AM. All but two of her crew survived the fight, and returned to France on the German supply ship Tannenfels, which was accompanying Stier at the time of the action.

== Raiding career ==
Date	Ship	Nationality	Tonnage	Fate
4 June 1942	SS Gemstone	British	4,986	Sunk
6 June 1942	SS Stanvac Calcutta	American	10,170	Sunk in combat
9 August 1942	SS Dalhousie	British	7,250	Sunk
27 September 1942	SS Stephen Hopkins	American	7,181	Sunk in combat
