= Sovtorgflot =

Shipping company in the Soviet Union

Sovtorgflot (Russian: "Совторгфлот", Советский торговый флот, "Soviet Commercial Fleet") was a shipping company in the Soviet Union. It was established as a joint-stock company on July 18, 1924. It united ships which belonged to different narkomats and companies, including the ones with foreign capital.

The entire Soviet commercial fleet was subordinated to the war effort following Nazi Germany's invasion of the USSR in June 1941.

== See also ==
- Dobrolyot
