= List of shipwrecks in July 1942 =

The list of shipwrecks in July 1942 includes all ships sunk, foundered, grounded, or otherwise lost during July 1942.

== 1 July ==
List of shipwrecks: 1 July 1942
Ship	State	Description
Cadmus	Norway	World War II: The cargo ship was torpedoed and sunk in the Gulf of Mexico (22°50′N 92°15′W) by U-129 (Kriegsmarine) with the loss of two of her 22 crew.
De Weert	Netherlands	World War II: The cargo ship was shelled and damaged in the Indian Ocean by I-18 (Imperial Japanese Navy). She sank on 3 July at 25°12′S 35°56′E with the loss of 69 of her 72 crew.
Edward Luckenbach	United States	World War II: The cargo ship entered an American minefield 5 nautical miles (9.3 km) off the Smith Shoal Light, Florida (24°56′N 81°53′W) and was sunk by two mines in shallow water with her superstructure above water. A crew member was killed. Survivors abandoned ship, but later reboarded and were rescued by a patrol boat. The wreck was later dispersed.
Eknaren	Sweden	World War II: The cargo ship was torpedoed and sunk in the Indian Ocean (17°14′S 39°42′E) by I-16 (Imperial Japanese Navy). Her crew were rescued; five by a whaler and the rest by Mundra (United Kingdom), although some of those were lost when Mundra was sunk five days later.
Gundersen	Norway	World War II: The cargo ship was torpedoed and sunk in the Atlantic Ocean (23°33′N 92°35′W) by U-129 (Kriegsmarine) with the loss of one of her 23 crew. Survivors were rescued by Dea (Norway).
Marilyse Moller	United Kingdom	World War II: Convoy Nugget: The coaster was torpedoed and sunk in the Mediterranean Sea north east of Port Said, Egypt (31°22′N 33°44′E) by U-97 (Kriegsmarine) with the loss of 31 of her 35 crew. Survivors were rescued by Burra (Royal Navy).
Montevideo Maru	Imperial Japanese Navy	World War II: The Santos Maru-class transport ship was torpedoed and sunk 65 nautical miles (120 km) north west of Cape Bojeador, Philippines (18°37′N 119°29′E) by USS Sturgeon (United States Navy). Eleven guards, nine of her crew and all 1,157 prisoners of war/civilian internees killed. About 70 of her crew made it to Luzon where 55 of them were killed by Filipinos on 4 July. There were a total of 26 Japanese survivors.
Sperrbrecher 191 Motor	Kriegsmarine	World War II: The Sperrbrecher struck a mine and sank in the Baltic Sea.
Warrior	United States	World War II: The cargo ship was torpedoed and sunk in the Atlantic Ocean 125 nautical miles (232 km) east of Trinidad (10°54′N 61°02′W) by U-126 (Kriegsmarine) with the loss of seven of her 56 crew. Survivors were rescued by USS Herbert (United States Navy).

== 2 July ==
List of shipwrecks: 2 July 1942
Ship	State	Description
Bditelnyi	Soviet Navy	World War II: The Gnevny-class destroyer was bombed and sunk at Novorossiysk by Junkers Ju 87 aircraft of I Staffeln, Kampfgeschwader 100, Luftwaffe.
Churnomor	Soviet Navy	World War II: The tug was bombed and sunk at Novorossiysk by Luftwaffe aircraft.
Elbrous	Soviet Union	World War II: The cargo ship was bombed and sunk at Anapa by Junkers Ju 87 aircraft of I Staffeln, Kampfgeschwader 100, Luftwaffe. Five of her crew were killed.
Kuban	Soviet Union	World War II: The cargo ship was bombed and sunk in the Black Sea by Junkers Ju 87 aircraft of I Staffeln, Kampfgeschwader 100, Luftwaffe.
Ledokol IV	Soviet Navy	World War II: The icebreaker/auxiliary gunboat was bombed and sunk at Temryuk by Junkers Ju 87 aircraft of I Staffeln, Kampfgeschwader 100, Luftwaffe.
Proletary	Soviet Union	World War II: The incomplete ship was bombed and sunk at Novorossiysk by Junkers Ju 87 aircraft of I Staffeln, Kampfgeschwader 100, Luftwaffe.
San Pablo	Panama	World War II: The cargo ship (3,305 GRT) was torpedoed and sunk at Puerto Limón, Costa Rica by U-161 (Kriegsmarine). One of her crew and 23 local stevedores were killed. She was raised on 6 March 1943, and towed toKey West, Florida, United States for repairs, but was later declared a constructive total loss and consequently sunk as a target off Pensacola, Florida (30°11′N 87°13′W) on 25 September 1943. The wreck was eventually dispersed with explosives.
T-404 Shchit	Soviet Navy	World War II: The minesweeper was sunk off Sevastopol by Luftwaffe aircraft.
Tashkent	Soviet Navy	World War II: The Tashkent-class destroyer was bombed and sunk in Tsemes Bay off Novorossiysk by Junkers Ju 87 aircraft of I Staffeln, Kampfgeschwader 100, Luftwaffe.
TKA-33	Soviet Navy	World War II: The G-5-class motor torpedo boat was sunk by Luftwaffe aircraft at Anapa. A crew was killed and three were wounded.
Ukraina	Soviet Union	World War II: The passenger ship was bombed and sunk at Novorossiysk by Junkers Ju 87 aircraft of I Staffeln, Kampfgeschwader 100, Luftwaffe. The wreck was raised on 23 September 1947, and scrapped in 1950.
Unyo Maru No.3	Japan	World War II: The cargo ship was torpedoed and sunk in the East China Sea by USS Plunger (United States Navy).
No. 021	Soviet Navy	The MO-4-class patrol vessel was lost on this date.
No. 0112	Soviet Navy	The MO-2-class patrol vessel was lost on this date.
No. 0124	Soviet Navy	The MO-4-class patrol vessel was lost on this date.
Unnamed	Soviet Union	World War II: The motorboat was aground on Black Sea coast and was shelled and destroyed by MAS-570, MAS-572, MAS-573, and MTSM-216 (all Regia Marina). Fifteen of her crew taken as prisoners of war.

== 3 July ==
List of shipwrecks: 3 July 1942
Ship	State	Description
Alexander Macomb	United States	World War II: Convoy BX 27: The Liberty ship (7,191 GRT), on her maiden voyage, was torpedoed and sunk in the Atlantic Ocean 175 nautical miles (324 km) east of Cape Cod, Massachusetts (41°40′N 66°52′W) by U-215 (Kriegsmarine) with the loss of ten of her 56 crew. Survivors were rescued by HMT Le Tiger (Royal Navy) and HMCS Regina (Royal Canadian Navy).
Minde	Denmark	World War II: The wooden coaster (97 GRT) was sunk by a mine in the Kattegat off Vesborg, Denmark with the loss of all four crew.
SKA-0112, and SKA-0124	Soviet Navy	World War II: Battle of Ai-Tador: The gunboats were torpedoed, or shelled, and sunk in the Black Sea by Schnellboote including S 70 (Kriegsmarine). Thirty-seven crew/troops were captured by the Schnellboote.
U-215	Kriegsmarine	World War II: The Type VIID submarine (1,285 GRT) was depth charged and sunk in the Atlantic Ocean east of Boston, Massachusetts, United States. (41°48′N 66°38′W) by HMT Le Tiger (Royal Navy) with the loss of all 48 crew.

== 4 July ==
List of shipwrecks: 4 July 1942
Ship	State	Description
Christopher Newport	United States	World War II: Convoy PQ 17: The Liberty ship, on her maiden voyage, was torpedoed and damaged in the Barents Sea by Heinkel He 115 aircraft of Küstenfliegergruppe 906, Luftwaffe with the loss of three of her 50 crew. She then straggled behind the convoy and was torpedoed and sunk (75°49′N 22°25′E) by U-457 (Kriegsmarine). Survivors were rescued by Zamalek (United Kingdom).
Norlandia	United States	World War II: The Design 1074 ship was torpedoed and sunk in the Atlantic Ocean 25 nautical miles (46 km) north east of Cape Samana, Dominican Republic (19°33′N 68°39′W) by U-575 (Kriegsmarine) with the loss of nine of her 30 crew. Survivors were rescued by Portland (Panama).
William Hooper	United States	World War II: Convoy PQ 17: The cargo ship was bombed and damaged in the Barents Sea by Heinkel He 111 aircraft of 1 Staffeln, Kampfgeschwader 26, Luftwaffe and was abandoned with the loss of three of her 58 crew. Survivors were rescued by Rathlin and Zamalek (both United Kingdom). A Royal Navy ship unsuccessfully attempted to scuttle her. William Hooper was later torpedoed, shelled and sunk (75°55′N 27°14′E) by U-334 (Kriegsmarine).
Nenohi	Imperial Japanese Navy	World War II: The Hatsuharu-class destroyer was torpedoed and sunk in the Pacific Ocean south east of Attu Island, Alaska Territory (52°15′N 173°51′E) by USS Triton (United States Navy) with the loss of 188 of her 226 crew. Survivors were rescued by Inazuma (Imperial Japanese Navy).
Sperrbrecher 61 Iris	Kriegsmarine	World War II: The Sperrbrecher struck a mine and sank in the North Sea off Schiermonnikoog, Friesland, Netherlands.
Tuapse	Soviet Union	World War II: The tanker was torpedoed and sunk in the Gulf of Mexico north west of Havana, Cuba (22°13′N 86°06′W) by U-129 (Kriegsmarine) with the loss of eight (or ten, according to Russian sources) of her 44 crew.
No. 155	Soviet Navy	The G-5-class motor torpedo boat was lost on this date.
No. 175	Soviet Navy	The G-5-class motor torpedo boat was lost on this date.

== 5 July ==
List of shipwrecks: 5 July 1942
Ship	State	Description
RFA Aldersdale	Royal Fleet Auxiliary	World War II: Convoy PQ 17: The Dale-class oiler was torpedoed and damaged in the Barents Sea by Junkers Ju 88 aircraft of III Staffeln, Kampfgeschwader 30, Luftwaffe. She was taken in tow by HMS Salamander (Royal Navy) but was later abandoned by her 54 crew, who were rescued by HMS Salamander. RFA Aldersdale was torpedoed, shelled and sunk on 7 July by U-457 (Kriegsmarine) (approximately 75°N 45°E).
Anna Katrin Fritzen	Germany	World War II: The coaster was torpedoed and sunk in the Baltic Sea west, or south, of Memel by ShCh-320 (Soviet Navy).
Arare	Imperial Japanese Navy	World War II: The Asashio-class destroyer was torpedoed and sunk in the Pacific Ocean east of Kiska Harbor, Alaska Territory by USS Growler (United States Navy) with the loss of 104 of her 146 crew.
Bolton Castle	United Kingdom	World War II: Convoy PQ 17: The cargo ship was bombed and sunk in the Barents Sea (76°40′N 36°30′E) by Heinkel He 111 aircraft of I or III Staffeln, Kampfgeschwader 30, Luftwaffe. Her 58 crew survived.
Carlton	United States	World War II: Convoy PQ 17: The cargo ship was torpedoed and sunk in the Barents Sea by U-88 (Kriegsmarine) with the loss of two of her 45 crew. Survivors were taken as prisoners of war when they landed at North Cape, Norway in their lifeboats on 25 July, with another crew member dying just before they made landfall. In 2015 the wreck of the ship was found in the Barents Sea at a depth between 200 and 300 m (660 and 980 ft).
Daniel Morgan	United States	World War II: Convoy PQ 17: The cargo ship was bombed and damaged in the Barents Sea by aircraft of I or III Staffeln, Kampfgeschwader 30, Luftwaffe. She was then torpedoed and sunk (75°08′N 45°06′E) by U-88 (Kriegsmarine) with the loss of three of her 54 crew. Survivors were rescued by Donbass (Soviet Union).
Earlston	United Kingdom	World War II: Convoy PQ 17: The cargo ship was bombed and damaged in the Barents Sea by Junkers Ju 88 aircraft of III Staffeln, Kampfgeschwader 30, Luftwaffe. She was later torpedoed and sunk (74°54′N 37°40′E) by U-334 (Kriegsmarine). Her 52 crew survived. In 2015 the wreck of the ship was found in the Barents Sea at a depth between 200 and 300 m (660 and 980 ft).
Empire Byron	United Kingdom	World War II: Convoy PQ 17: The cargo ship was torpedoed in the Barents Sea (76°18′N 33°30′E) by Heinkel He 111 aircraft of the Luftwaffe, then torpedoed and sunk by U-703 (Kriegsmarine), with the loss of seven of the 69 people aboard.
Empire Surf	United Kingdom	World War II: Convoy ON 55: The cargo ship was torpedoed and sunk in the Atlantic Ocean south east of the Faroe Islands (58°42′N 19°16′W) by U-43 (Kriegsmarine).
Exterminator	Panama	World War II: Convoy QP 13: The cargo ship struck a mine and was damaged off Straumnes, Iceland. She was consequently scrapped at Philadelphia, Pennsylvania, United States, in April 1944.
Fairfield City	United States	World War II: Convoy PQ 17: The cargo ship was bombed and sunk in the Barents Sea (74°40′N 39°45′E) by Junkers Ju 88 aircraft of I or III Staffeln, Kampfgeschwader 30, Luftwaffe with the loss of eight of her 42 crew.
Heffron	United States	World War II: Convoy QP 13: The cargo ship struck a mine and sank in the Norwegian Sea.
Honomu	United States	World War II: Convoy PQ 17: The cargo ship was torpedoed and sunk in the Barents Sea by U-456 (Kriegsmarine) with the loss of thirteen of her 41 crew. Twenty-two survivors were rescued by British warships on 18 July, and ten (of nineteen originally in the lifeboat) by U-209 (Kriegsmarine) on the 22 July. In 2015 the wreck of the ship was found in the Barents Sea at a depth between 200 and 300 m (660 and 980 ft).
Hybert	United States	World War II: Convoy QP 13: The cargo ship struck a mine and sank in the Norwegian Sea north west of Iceland (66°34′N 23°14′W). All 76 people on board, including 26 survivors from Syros (United States) were rescued by HMT Lady Madeleine (Royal Navy) and Roselys (Free French Naval Forces).
John Randolf	United States	World War II: Convoy QP 13: The Liberty ship struck a mine and sank in the Denmark Strait.
KM-0101	Soviet Navy	World War II: The guard ship was sunk in the Black Sea off the Zemesskaya Peninsula by an aircraft of II Staffeln, Kampfgeschwader 26, Luftwaffe.
Massmar	United States	World War II: Convoy QP 13: The cargo ship struck a mine and sank in the Norwegian Sea (66°34′N 23°14′W) with the loss of 48 of the 90 people on board.
Navarino	United Kingdom	World War II: Convoy PQ 17: The cargo ship was bombed and damaged in the Barents Sea (75°57′N 27°14′E) by Heinkel He 111 aircraft of I Staffel, Kampfgeschwader 26, Luftwaffe with the loss of fifteen lives. She was subsequently torpedoed and sunk by HMS P614 (Royal Navy).
HMS Niger	Royal Navy	World War II: Convoy QP 13: The Halcyon-class minesweeper struck a mine and sank in the Norwegian Sea north west of Iceland (66°35′N 23°14′W).
Pan Kraft	United States	World War II: Convoy PQ 17: The cargo ship was disabled in an air attack by Junkers Ju 88 aircraft of the Luftwaffe with the loss of two of her 47 crew. She was scuttled the next day (78°50′N 38°00′E) by HMS Lotus (Royal Navy).
Paulus Potter	Netherlands	World War II: Convoy PQ 17: The cargo ship was bombed and damaged in the Barents Sea west of Novaya Zemlya, Soviet Union (approximately 70°N 25°E) by Junkers Ju 88 aircraft of III Staffel, Kampfgeschwader 30, Luftwaffe, and was abandoned by her 76 crew. Paulus Potter was torpedoed and sunk on 13 July by U-255 (Kriegsmarine).
Peter Kerr	United States	World War II: Convoy PQ 17: The cargo ship was bombed and sunk in the Barents Sea (74°30′N 35°00′E) by aircraft of I or III Staffeln, Kampfgeschwader 30, Luftwaffe. Her 49 crew survived.
River Afton	United Kingdom	World War II: Convoy PQ 17: The cargo ship was torpedoed and sunk in the Barents Sea (75°57′N 43°00′E) by U-703 (Kriegsmarine) with the loss of 26 of the 64 people aboard.
Rodina	Soviet Union	World War II: Convoy QP 13: The cargo ship struck a mine and sank in the Norwegian Sea 50 nautical miles (93 km) off the coast of Iceland with the loss of 39 of her 55 crew.
HMS Sword Dance	Royal Navy	The Dance-class naval trawler collided with Thyra II (United Kingdom) and sank in the Moray Firth.
Washington	United States	World War II: Convoy PQ 17: The cargo ship was bombed and sunk in the Barents Sea by Heinkel 111 aircraft of I or III Staffeln, Kampfgeschwader 26, Luftwaffe. Her 46 crew survived.
Zaafaran	United Kingdom	World War II: Convoy PQ 17: The convoy rescue ship was bombed and sunk in the Barents Sea by aircraft of I or III Staffeln, Kampfgeschwader 30, Luftwaffe.

== 6 July ==
List of shipwrecks: 6 July 1942
Ship	State	Description
Anastassios Pateras	Greece	World War II: Convoy QS 15: The cargo ship was torpedoed and sunk in the Gulf of Saint Lawrence (49°12′N 66°55′W) by U-132 (Kriegsmarine) with the loss of three of her 26 crew.
Argentina	Sweden	World War II: The cargo ship struck a mine and sank in the North Sea 30 nautical miles (56 km) south west of Kristiansand, Norway with the loss of four lives.
Avila Star	United Kingdom	World War II: The ocean liner was torpedoed and sunk in the Atlantic Ocean north east of the Azores, Portugal by U-201 (Kriegsmarine) with the loss of 84 of the 196 people aboard. Survivors were rescued by Lima and Pedro Nunes (both Portuguese Navy).
Bayard	Norway	World War II: The cargo ship was torpedoed and sunk in the Caribbean Sea (29°35′N 88°44′W) by U-67 (Kriegsmarine) with the loss of eleven of her 32 crew.
Dinaric	United Kingdom	World War II: Convoy QS 15: The cargo ship was torpedoed and damaged in the Saint Lawrence River (49°30′N 66°30′W) by U-132 (Kriegsmarine) with the loss of four of her 38 crew. She sank on 9 July (49°15′N 66°43′W). Survivors were rescued by HMCS Drummondville (Royal Canadian Navy).
Hainaut	Belgium	World War II: Convoy QS 15: The cargo ship was torpedoed and sunk in the Gulf of Saint Lawrence (49°13′N 66°43′W) by U-132 (Kriegsmarine) with the loss of one of her 45 crew.
Hero	Norway	World War II: The cargo ship was torpedoed and sunk in the Mediterranean Sea (32°23′N 34°35′E) by U-375 (Kriegsmarine) with the loss of 30 of her 43 crew. The wreck was raised in March 1944 and scrapped.
John Witherspoon	United States	World War II: Convoy PQ 17: The Liberty ship was torpedoed and sunk in the Barents Sea (72°05′N 48°30′E) by U-255 (Kriegsmarine) with the loss of one of her 50 crew. Survivors were rescued by El Capitan (Panama), HMS La Malouine and HMT Lord Austin (both Royal Navy).
Lalita	Panama	World War II: The fishing vessel was shelled and sunk in the Yucatan Channel (21°45′N 86°40′W) by U-154 (Kriegsmarine). Her crew survived.
Montrose	Panama	The cargo ship ran aground near Kvanefjeld, Greenland (60°57′N 45°49′W). She was declared a total loss.
Mundra	United Kingdom	World War II: The cargo ship was torpedoed, shelled, and sunk in the Indian Ocean south of St. Lucia Bay (28°45′S 32°20′E) by I-18 (Imperial Japanese Navy). She was carrying survivors of De Weert (Netherlands), which had been sunk on 1 July. One hundred and fifty-five people survived the sinking of Mundra.
Nymphe	Greece	World War II: The cargo ship was torpedoed and sunk in the Indian Ocean (15°48′S 40°42′E) by I-10 (Imperial Japanese Navy) with the loss of one of her 41 crew.
Pan Atlantic	United States	World War II: Convoy PQ 17: The tanker was sunk in the Barents Sea by aircraft of I or III Staffeln, Kampfgeschwader 30, Luftwaffe with the loss of 26 of her 49 crew.
Tinos	Kriegsmarine	World War II: The transport ship was bombed, exploded and sank at Benghazi, Libya.
U-502	Kriegsmarine	World War II: The Type IXC submarine was depth charged and sunk in the Bay of Biscay west of La Rochelle, Charente-Inférieure, France (46°10′N 6°40′W) by a Vickers Wellington aircraft of 172 Squadron, Royal Air Force with the loss of all 52 crew.
Uddeholm	Sweden	World War II: The cargo ship struck a mine and sank in the North Sea 30 nautical miles (56 km) south west of Kristiansand (57°39′N 7°10′E). There were no casualties.

== 7 July ==
List of shipwrecks: 7 July 1942
Ship	State	Description
Alcoa Ranger	United States	World War II: Convoy PQ 17: The Design 1022 ship was torpedoed and sunk in the Barents Sea (71°38′N 49°35′E) by U-255 (Kriegsmarine). Her 40 crew reached Cape Kanin, Soviet Union in their lifeboats on 14 July, and were later rescued by two Soviet Navy patrol boats.
Else Marie	Germany	World War II: The cargo ship was bombed and sunk in the Barents Sea off Vardø, Norway, by Petlyakov Pe-2 aircraft of the Soviet Air Force with the loss of thirteen of her crew.
Hartlebury	United Kingdom	World War II: Convoy PQ 17: The cargo ship was torpedoed and sunk in the Barents Sea (72°30′N 52°00′E) by U-355 (Kriegsmarine) with the loss of 38 of her 58 crew.
Haruna Maru	Imperial Japanese Army	The Hakone Maru-class auxiliary transport ran aground off Omaezaki (34°35′N 138°15′E) in dense fog and was wrecked. During salvage operations she rolled over and sank on 21 July.
Oklahoman	United States	The cargo ship ran aground off Dassen Island, Union of South Africa. She was refloated and taken in tow, but consequently sank 1 1/4 nautical miles (2.3 km) west of Robben Island.
Rufus King	United States	Rufus King The Liberty ship ran aground on Moreton Island, Queensland, Australia and broke in two. The bow section was salvaged by the Commonwealth Marine Salvage Board, taken over by the U.S. Army Small Ships Section and equipped with vertical boiler for power, a machine shop used for repairing vessels and bunkers for coal and fuel oil for refueling them. Given the number S-129 and dubbed "Half Rufus", the salvaged bow was towed to Milne Bay, arriving 21 June 1944. It was then towed to Finschhafen, Papua New Guinea, where repair equipment was transferred to a barge in April 1945 and the bow section was then used as a coal hulk.
Sarcoxie	United States	World War II: Convoy PQ 17: The cargo ship was torpedoed, shelled and sunk in the Barents Sea (71°20′N 51°00′E) by U-255(Kriegsmarine). Her 40 crew survived.
U-701	Kriegsmarine	U-701 World War II: The Type VIIC submarine (1,070 GRT) was depth charged and sunk in the Atlantic Ocean off Cape Hatteras, North Carolina, United States (34°50′N 74°55′W) by a Lockheed Hudson aircraft of the 396th Bomb Squadron, United States Army Air Force. Most of her crew survived the sinking and escaped the wreck, but they drifted at sea for several days before a Hall PH-2 aircraft of the United States Navy picked the only 7 survivors. 39 crew died.
Umtata	United Kingdom	World War II: The cargo liner was torpedoed and sunk in the Atlantic Ocean south east of Key Biscayne, Florida, United States (25°35′N 80°02′W) by U-571 (Kriegsmarine). Her 92 crew were rescued by USCGC Thetis ( United States Coast Guard).
William H. Machen	United States	During a voyage from Norfolk, Virginia, to Portland, Maine, with a cargo of coal, the cargo ship sank in 300 feet (91 m) of water in the Atlantic Ocean 5 nautical miles (9.3 km; 5.8 mi) east of White Island in the Isles of Shoals off the coast of New Hampshire (42°57′00″N 070°29′58″W) after colliding with Maid of Stirling ( Canada). Her 34 crew abandoned ship in lifeboats and were rescued by the United States Coast Guard. Divers discovered her wreck during the summer of 2017.

== 8 July ==
List of shipwrecks: 8 July 1942
Ship	State	Description
Alchiba	Netherlands	World War II: The cargo ship was torpedoed, shelled, and sunk in the Mozambique Channel (18°30′S 41°40′E) by I-10 (Imperial Japanese Navy). Five of her 45 crew were killed.
Hartismere	United Kingdom	World War II: The cargo ship was torpedoed, shelled, and sunk in the Mozambique Channel (18°00′S 41°22′E) by I-10 (Imperial Japanese Navy). Her 47 crew survived, sailing their lifeboats to Portuguese East Africa.
J. A. Moffett, Jr.	United States	World War II: The tanker was torpedoed and then shelled with 88mm deck gun in the Atlantic Ocean 3 nautical miles (5.6 km) off the Tennessee Reef, Florida (24°47′N 80°42′W) by U-571 (Kriegsmarine). J. A. Moffett, Jr. later ran aground on the reef with the loss of her captain. The 42 survivors were rescued by USCGC Mary Jean, USCGC Nike and USCGC Southbound (all United States Coast Guard). She was refloated in October 1942 and towed to Key West, Florida, where she was declared a total loss. She was scrapped at Galveston, Texas in January 1943.
MO-306	Soviet Navy	World War II: Battle of Someri: The submarine chaser was sunk by Finnish vessels.
Olopana	United States	World War II: Convoy PQ 17: The Design 1015 ship was torpedoed, shelled and sunk in the Barents Sea (72°10′N 51°00′E) by U-255 (Kriegsmarine) with the loss of seven of her 41 crew.
Otto Cords	Germany	World War II: The cargo ship was torpedoed and sunk in the Baltic Sea offthe coast of Sweden (55°49′N 15°01′E) by ShCh-317 (Soviet Navy).
Tenzan Maru	Imperial Japanese Navy	World War II: The Tenzan Maru-class auxiliary transport was torpedoed and sunk 30 miles (48 km) west of Rabaul, Papua New Guinea (04°00′S 151°50′E) by USS S-37 (United States Navy) with the loss of 82 lives.
TK-22	Soviet Navy	World War II: Battle of Someri: The D-3-class motor torpedo boat was sunk by Finnish vessels.
TK-31	Soviet Navy	World War II: Battle of Someri: The G-5-class motor torpedo boat was sunk by Finnish coastal artillery.
TK-71	Soviet Navy	World War II: Battle of Someri: The G-5-class motor torpedo boat was sunk by Finnish vessels.
TK-73	Soviet Navy	World War II: Battle of Someri: The G-5-class motor torpedo boat was sunk by Finnish vessels.
TK-83	Soviet Navy	World War II: Battle of Someri: The G-4-class motor torpedo boat was sunk by Uusimaa and Hameenmaa (both Finnish Navy).
TK-113	Soviet Navy	World War II: Battle of Someri: The G-5-class motor torpedo boat was sunk by Uusimaa (Finnish Navy).
TK-121	Soviet Navy	World War II: Battle of Someri: The G-5-class motor torpedo boat was sunk by Uusimaa and Hameenmaa (Finnish Navy).
TK-123	Soviet Navy	World War II: Battle of Someri: The G-5-class motor torpedo boat was sunk by Uusimaa and Hameenmaa (both Finnish Navy).

== 9 July ==
List of shipwrecks: 9 July 1942
Ship	State	Description
Bokn	Norway	World War II: Convoy WP 183: The coaster was torpedoed and sunk in Lyme Bay by S 70 (Kriegsmarine) with the loss of twelve of her sixteen crew.
Cape Verde	United Kingdom	World War II: The cargo ship was torpedoed and sunk in the Atlantic Ocean east of Grenada (11°32′N 60°17′W) by U-203 (Kriegsmarine) with the loss of two of her 42 crew.
El Capitan	Panama	World War II: Convoy PQ 17: The cargo ship was torpedoed and damaged in the Barents Sea 65 nautical miles (120 km) north east of Iokanka, Soviet Union (70°10′N 41°40′E) by Junkers Ju 88 aircraft of II Staffeln, Kampfgeschwader 30, Luftwaffe. All 67 people aboard, including the 19 survivors from John Witherspoon (United States) were rescued by HMT Lord Austin (Royal Navy), which attempted to scuttle the wreck. El Capitan was torpedoed and sunk on 10 July (69°23′N 40°50′E) by U-251 (Kriegsmarine).
Empire Explorer	United Kingdom	World War II: The cargo ship was torpedoed and sunk in the Caribbean Sea off Grenada (11°40′N 60°55′W) by U-575 (Kriegsmarine) with the loss of three of her 78 crew.
Hoosier	United States	World War II: Convoy PQ 17: The Design 1022 ship was bombed and damaged in the Barents Sea 65 nautical miles (120 km) north east of Iokanka by Junkers Ju 88 aircraft of II Staffeln, Kampfgeschwader 26, Luftwaffe. Her 53 crew abandoned ship and were rescued by HMS Poppy (Royal Navy). Hoosier was taken in tow by HMS La Malouine (Royal Navy) but salvage attempts were abandoned when U-255 (Kriegsmarine) was spotted. An attempt was made to scuttle her by HMS Poppy. Hoosier was torpedoed and sunk the next day (69°25′N 38°35′E) by U-376 (Kriegsmarine).
Kongshaug	Norway	World War II: Convoy WP 183: The cargo ship was torpedoed and sunk in the English Channel 50 nautical miles (93 km; 58 mi) north west of Alderney, Channel Islands by S 48 (Kriegsmarine) with the loss of eight of her 20 crew. Survivors were rescued by HMS Brocklesby (Royal Navy).
HMT Manor	Royal Navy	World War II: Convoy WP 183: The 130-foot (40 m), 314-ton anti-submarine naval trawler was torpedoed and sunk in the English Channel in Lyme Bay off the coast of Devon (50°19′N 03°01′W) by S 63 (Kriegsmarine) with the loss of 29 of her 30 crew. The only survivor was rescued by HMT Ruby (Royal Navy).
Margareta	Sweden	World War II: The cargo ship was torpedoed and sunk in the Baltic Sea (58°26′N 17°13′E) by S-7 (Soviet Navy) with the loss of fourteen of her eighteen crew.
Nicholas Cuneo	Honduras	World War II: The cargo ship was shelled and sunk in the Gulf of Mexico 47 miles (76 km) north of Havana, Cuba (23°54′N 82°33′W) by U-571 (Kriegsmarine) with the loss of one of her 20 crew.
Pomella	United Kingdom	World War II: Convoy WP 183: The tanker was torpedoed and sunk in the English Channel off the coast of Devon (50°19′N 3°00′W) by S-67 (Kriegsmarine) with the loss of six of her 59 crew.
Reggestroom	Netherlands	World War II: Convoy WP 183: The tanker was torpedoed and sunk in the English Channel off the coast of Devon (50°19′N 3°00′W) by S-50 (Kriegsmarine). Her 47 crew survived.
Røsten	Norway	World War II: Convoy WP 183: The cargo ship was torpedoed and sunk in the English Channel off the coast of Devon by S-109 (Kriegsmarine) with the loss of six of her eighteen crew. Survivors were rescued by HMS Brocklesby (Royal Navy) and Gripfast (United Kingdom).
Santa Rita	United States	World War II: The cargo ship was torpedoed, shelled and sunk in the Caribbean Sea (26°11′N 55°40′W) by U-172 (Kriegsmarine) with the loss of four of her 63 crew. A crew member was taken as a prisoner of war. The rest of the survivors were rescued by USS Livermore and USS Mayo (both United States Navy) and a United States Army Air Force rescue boat.
Shinsho Maru	Imperial Japanese Navy	World War II: The destroyer tender was torpedoed and sunk in the Pacific Ocean 11 nautical miles (20 km) south west of Kiiyo, Kwajalein Atoll, Marshall Islands (08°43′N 167°33′E) by USS Thresher (United States Navy).
Triglav	Yugoslavia	World War II: The cargo ship was torpedoed and sunk in the Atlantic Ocean 800 nautical miles (1,500 km) east south east of the Bahamas (26°47′N 48°10′W) by U-66 (Kriegsmarine) with the loss of 24 of her 43 crew.
No. 306	Soviet Navy	The MO-4-class patrol vessel was lost on this date.
UJ-1110 Mob-FD 6	Kriegsmarine	World War II: The auxiliary submarine chaser was sunk by a mine off Magerøysund, Norway (70°39′N 23°38′E) with the loss of 25 of her 55 crew.
Unidentified submarine	Flag unknown	World War II: After being damaged by a Bristol Bolingbroke maritime patrol aircraft of the Royal Canadian Air Force, a submarine was depth charged and sunk with the loss of the entire crew by the cutter USCGC McLane ( United States Coast Guard) and the United States Coast Guard-crewed patrol vessel USS YP-251 (United States Navy) in the Pacific Ocean off the coast of the Alaska Territory (55°20′N 134°40′W). Identified in 1947 as Ro-32 (Imperial Japanese Navy), her identity reverted to unknown in 1967 when the United States Navy verified that Ro-32 was inactive in Japan at the time and survived the war. One hypothesis is that the sunken submarine was Shch-138 (Soviet Navy).

== 10 July ==
List of shipwrecks: 10 July 1942
Ship	State	Description
Benjamin Brewster	United States	World War II: The tanker was torpedoed and sunk in the Gulf of Mexico off Grand Isle, Louisiana (29°05′N 90°05′W) by U-67 (Kriegsmarine) with the loss of 25 of her 40 crew. The wreck was salvaged in September 1951 and scrapped.
F 256	Kriegsmarine	World War II: The Type AM Marinefährprahm was sunk by a mine in the Baltic Sea near Bolshoi Tyuters Island, Soviet Union with heavy casualties.
M 4401 Imbrin	Kriegsmarine	World War II: The auxiliary minesweeper, a Mersey-class trawler was mined and sunk in the Bay of Biscay.
Vishera	Soviet Union	World War II: The cargo ship was bombed and sunk in the Barents Sea by Junkers Ju 88 aircraft of the Luftwaffe. Four of her 34 crew were killed.
No. 83	Soviet Navy	The Sh-4 Type motor torpedo boat was lost on this date.
No. 123	Soviet Navy	The G-5-class motor torpedo boat was lost on this date.
No. 152	Soviet Navy	The G-5-class motor torpedo boat was lost on this date.

== 11 July ==
List of shipwrecks: 11 July 1942
Ship	State	Description
Brook	Germany	World War II: The cargo ship was bombed and sunk by aircraft off Mersa Matruh, Egypt.
Carmen	Dominican Republic	World War II: The schooner was shelled and sunk in the Atlantic Ocean 8 nautical miles (15 km) north of Gaspar Hernández (19°43′N 70°12′W) by U-166 (Kriegsmarine) with the loss of one of her eight crew.
Delos	Germany	World War II: The cargo ship was bombed, set afire, and damaged by British aircraft at Tobruk, Libya and was beached. She was declared a total loss. The wreck was refloated in 1950 and scrapped at Savona, Italy.
Hannah	Sweden	The cargo ship struck a submerged object, possibly a submarine, and foundered in the Bay of Han.
Landego	Norway	World War II: The cable layer struck a mine and sank in the Barents Sea (68°52′30″N 16°15′24″E) with the loss of nine of the eighteen people aboard.
Luleå	Sweden	World War II: The cargo ship was torpedoed and sunk in the Baltic Sea 11 nautical miles (20 km) east of Västervik (57°45′N 17°00′E) by S-7 (Soviet Navy) with the loss of eight of her 33 crew.
MO-211	Soviet Navy	World War II: The MO-4-class patrol vessel was sunk by a mine off Seskar.
Ondina	Regia Marina	World War II: The Sirena-class submarine was sunk 60 nautical miles (110 km) west of Beirut, Lebanon (34°35′N 34°56′E) by HMSAS Protea and HMSAS Southern Maid (both South African Navy) and a Supermarine Walrus aircraft of 700 Squadron, Fleet Air Arm.
Stanvac Palembang	Panama	World War II: The tanker was torpedoed and sunk in the Atlantic Ocean 15 nautical miles (28 km) off Tobago (11°28′N 60°23′W) by U-203 (Kriegsmarine) with the loss of five of her 50 crew. Survivors were rescued by USS PC-8 (United States Navy).
Tiny	Netherlands	World War II: Convoy WP 185: The 136-foot (41 m) British-chartered Coastal Cargo-class ship was bombed and sunk 13 miles (21 km) northeast of St. Ives, Cornwall. The crew were rescued from lifeboats hours later.
U-136	Kriegsmarine	World War II: The Type VIIC submarine was depth charged and sunk in the Atlantic Ocean (33°30′N 22°52′W) by Léopard (Free French Naval Forces), HMS Pelican and HMS Spey (both Royal Navy) with the loss of all 45 crew.
Unidentified ship	Luftwaffe	World War II: The Siebel ferry (possibly SF 119 or SF 123) was mined in the Sea of Azov off "Jeisk", Soviet Union.
V 1236 Flevo III	Kriegsmarine	World War II: The naval trawler/Vorpostenboot struck a mine and sank.

== 12 July ==
List of shipwrecks: 12 July 1942
Ship	State	Description
Adda	Italy	World War II: The cargo ship was torpedoed, shelled and sunk off Monte Santo, Sardinia by HMS Safari (Royal Navy).
Antares	Turkey	World War II: The tanker was torpedoed and damaged in the Mediterranean Sea (34°35′N 35°39′E) by Alagi (Regia Marina) and beached on Ruad Island off Trpoli, Lebanon. Antares was later refloated and towed to Turkey. She was scrapped in late 1943.
Cortona	United Kingdom	World War II: The cargo ship was torpedoed and sunk in the Atlantic Ocean south of the Azores, Portugal (32°45′N 24°45′W) by U-116 and U-201 (both Kriegsmarine) with the loss of 31 of her 54 crew. Survivors were rescued by HMS Pathfinder (Royal Navy).
Hiyama Maru	Japan	World War II: The cargo ship was torpedoed and sunk off Cam Ranh Bay, French Indochina (13°47′N 109°33′E) by USS Seadragon (United States Navy).
HMNZ ML1090	Royal New Zealand Navy	World War II: The Fairmile B motor launch was being carried as deck cargo aboard Port Hunter (United Kingdom) and was lost when that ship was torpedoed and sunk in the Atlantic Ocean 370 miles (600 km) west of Madeira, Portugal by U-582 (Kriegsmarine).
Port Hunter	United Kingdom	World War II: The cargo ship (8,826 GRT, 1922) was torpedoed and sunk in the Atlantic Ocean west of Madeira (approximately 31°N 24°W) by U-582 (Kriegsmarine) with the loss of 88 of the 91 people aboard. Survivors were rescued by HMS Rother (Royal Navy).
Shaftesbury	United Kingdom	World War II: The cargo ship was torpedoed and sunk in the Atlantic Ocean 430 nautical miles (800 km) south east of Las Palmas, Canary Islands, Spain (31°42′N 25°30′W) by U-116 (Kriegsmarine). Her captain was taken aboard U-116 as a prisoner of war. Forty-four survivors were rescued by Tuscan Star (United Kingdom) or reached land in their lifeboats.
Siris	United Kingdom	World War II: The cargo ship was torpedoed and sunk in the Atlantic Ocean (31°20′N 24°48′W) by U-201 (Kriegsmarine) with the loss of three of her 55 crew. Survivors were rescued by HMS Jonquil (Royal Navy).
Sturla	Italy	World War II: The cargo ship was torpedoed and sunk in the Mediterranean Sea off Mersa Matruh, Egypt by aircraft of the Fleet Air Arm, and by Royal Navy motor torpedo boats.
HNLMS Terschelling	Royal Netherlands Navy	World War II: The MMS-class minesweeper was bombed and sunk at 1347 hrs during trials off Brixham by a Focke-Wulf Fw 190 aircraft of 10 Staffeln, Jagdgeschwader 2, Luftwaffe. five of her crew were injured. She was raised in September 1942, repaired and put into Royal Navy service.
Tachirá	United States	World War II: The cargo ship was torpedoed and sunk in the Caribbean Sea 375 nautical miles (694 km) north west of Jamaica (18°15′N 81°45′W) by U-129 (Kriegsmarine) with the loss of five of her 38 crew.

== 13 July ==
List of shipwrecks: 13 July 1942
Ship	State	Description
Andrew Jackson	United States	World War II: The cargo ship was torpedoed and sunk in the Gulf of Mexico 20 nautical miles (37 km) off the Cárdenas Lighthouse, Cuba (23°32′N 81°02′W) by U-84 (Kriegsmarine) with the loss of three of her 49 crew. Survivors reached Cuba in their lifeboats 12 hours later.
Duchessa D'Aosta	United Kingdom	The cargo ship caught fire and sank at Greenock, Renfrewshire. She was subsequently refloated, repaired and returned to service as Empire Yukon.
Mikage Maru No. 3	Imperial Japanese Navy	The Mifune Maru-class auxiliary transport ship was in a collision, probably in fog, with Anzan Maru (Japan) 3 miles (4.8 km) south of Tsurishima, foundering later in the day.
Oneida	United States	World War II: The cargo ship was torpedoed and sunk in the Atlantic Ocean 2 nautical miles (3.7 km) north of Cape Maysi, Cuba (20°17′N 74°06′W) by U-166 (Kriegsmarine) with the loss of six of her 29 crew.
FN 07 Petite Yvette	Kriegsmarine	The naval trawler was lost on this date.
Rennes	Free French Naval Forces	World War II: The submarine chaser was bombed and sunk off Dartmouth, Devon, United Kingdom by two Focke-Wulf Fw 190 aircraft of 10 Staffeln, Jagdgeschwader 2, Luftwaffe with the loss of all 26 hands.
R. W. Gallagher	United States	World War II: The tanker was torpedoed and sunk in the Gulf of Mexico (28°50′N 91°05′W) by U-67 (Kriegsmarine) with the loss of two gunners and eight of her crew. Survivors were rescued by USCGC Boutwell ( United States Coast Guard), two more of her crew died of their wounds after being rescued.
Shinyo Maru	Imperial Japanese Navy	World War II: The Toyo Maru-class transport was torpedoed and sunk in the South China Sea 10 nautical miles (19 km) northeast of Cape Varella, French Indochina (13°05′N 109°29′E) by USS Seadragon (United States Navy). A crew member was killed.
Sithonia	United Kingdom	World War II: The cargo ship was torpedoed and sunk in the Atlantic Ocean west of the Canary Isles, Spain (approximately 29°N 25°W) by U-201 (Kriegsmarine) with the loss of seven of her 53 crew. Survivors were rescued by a Spanish fishing vessel or reached land in their lifeboat.
U-153	Kriegsmarine	World War II: The Type IXC submarine was damaged by USS PC-458 (United States Navy) and a United States Army Air Force aircraft, then depth charged and sunk in the Caribbean Sea off Colón, Panama (9°46′N 81°29′W) by USS Lansdowne (United States Navy) with the loss of all 52 crew.

== 14 July ==
List of shipwrecks: 14 July 1942
Ship	State	Description
Arcata	(United States)	World War II: The Design 1049 ship was damaged by gunfire in the Gulf of Alaska, approximately 165 nautical miles (306 km; 190 mi) southeast of Sand Point, Territory of Alaska (53°41′N 157°45′W), by I-7 (Imperial Japanese Navy) with the loss of eight of her 32 crew. She sank the next day. Eleven survivors were rescued by USS Kane (United States Navy) and thirteen by the fishing vessel Yukon (Flag unknown).
Atılay	Turkish Navy	World War II: The Ay-class submarine hit a mine, possibly from the First World War, and sank in the Dardanelles off Çanakkale with the loss of all 40 hands.
Empire Snipe	United Kingdom	World War II: The Design 1074 ship was damaged by a limpet mine 1 1/2 nautical miles (2.8 km) off Gibraltar and was beached. She was on a voyage from Lisbon Portugal to a British port. She was later refloated, repaired and returned to service.
F 243	Kriegsmarine	World War II: The Type A Marinefahrprahm was bombed and sunk in the Arctic Ocean by Ilyushin Il-4 aircraft of the Soviet Air Force with the loss of thirteen of her fourteen crew.
Pietro Calvi	Regia Marina	World War II: The Calvi-class submarine was rammed and sunk in the Atlantic Ocean north west of the Canary Islands (30°35′N 25°58′W) by HMS Lulworth (Royal Navy).
ShCh-317	Soviet Navy	World War II: The Shchuka-class submarine was damaged by Kriegsmarine patrol ships and was later in the day sunk in the Gulf of Finland by Ruotsinsalmi and VMV 6 (both Finnish Navy).

== 15 July ==
List of shipwrecks: 15 July 1942
Ship	State	Description
Bluefields	Nicaragua	World War II: Convoy KS 520: The cargo ship was torpedoed and sunk in the Atlantic Ocean (34°46′N 75°22′W) by U-576 (Kriegsmarine). Her 24 crew survived.
British Yeoman	United Kingdom	World War II: The tanker was torpedoed and sunk in the Atlantic Ocean south west of the Canary Islands, Spain (26°46′N 24°20′W) by U-201 (Kriegsmarine) with the loss of 43 of her 53 crew. Survivors were rescued by Castillo Almenara (Spain).
CH-25	Imperial Japanese Navy	World War II: The CH-13-class submarine chaser was torpedoed and sunk west of Sredni Point, Kiska, Territory of Alaska (52°02′N 177°42′E) by USS Grunion (United States Navy). She was lost with all hands.
CH-27	Imperial Japanese Navy	World War II: The CH-13-class submarine chaser was torpedoed and sunk west of Sredni Point (52°02′N 177°42′E) by USS Grunion (United States Navy). She was lost with all hands.
Chilore	United States	World War II: Convoy KS 520: The ore carrier was torpedoed and damaged in the Atlantic Ocean (34°47′N 75°22′W) by U-576 (Kriegsmarine). She then ran into a minefield and was struck by two mines with the loss of two of the 56 people aboard. All except her captain abandoned ship and were rescued by a United States Coast Guard vessel. Chilore was beached in Hatteras Inlet (36°57′N 76°00′W). She was later taken in tow by a United States Navy ship, but capsized and sank in Chesapeake Bay on 24 July. The wreck was scrapped in 1954.
Empire Attendant	United Kingdom	World War II: The cargo liner was torpedoed and sunk in the Atlantic Ocean south west of the Canary Islands, Spain (23°48′N 21°51′W) by U-582 (Kriegsmarine). All 59 crew were lost.
Gloucester Castle	United Kingdom	World War II: The passenger ship was shelled and sunk in the South Atlantic Ocean off South West Africa by Michel (Kriegsmarine). Her master and 92 passengers and crew were killed; 61 were made prisoners of war. They were eventually turned over to the Japanese.
Hakodate Maru	Japan	World War II: The transport ship was torpedoed and sunk in the South China Sea north of Cape Varella, French Indochina (15°55′N 109°29′E) by USS Seadragon (United States Navy).
J. A. Mowinckel	Panama	World War II: Convoy KS 520: The tanker was torpedoed and damaged in the Atlantic Ocean (33°44′N 75°19′W) by U-576 (Kriegsmarine) with the loss of two of her 59 crew. She then struck a mine and was abandoned by the survivors. J. A. Mowinckel was towed to the Hatteras Inlet on 20 July and was beached. After surviving hitting another mine on 23 July, she was towed to Baltimore, Maryland, United States. She was later repaired, and returned to service in March 1943.
Kola	Soviet Union	World War II: The cargo ship struck a mine and sank off Kertsch.
LK-2	Soviet Navy	The auxiliary guard ship (140 t, 1938) was sunk on this date.
Pennsylvania Sun	United States	World War II: The tanker was torpedoed and damaged in the Gulf of Mexico (24°05′N 83°42′W) by U-571 (Kriegsmarine) with the loss of two of her 59 crew. Survivors abandoned the burning ship and were rescued by USS Dahlgren (United States Navy). The next day, five of her crew and a salvage party from USS Willett (United States Navy) reboarded the ship and extinguished the fire. Pennsylvania Sun was towed to Chester, Pennsylvania. She was later repaired and returned to service.
U-576	Kriegsmarine	World War II: The Type VIIC submarine was depth charged off Cape Hatteras, North Carolina, United States by two Vought Kingfisher aircraft of the United States Navy. She was then shelled and sunk (34°51′N 75°22′W) by Unicoi (United States) with the loss of all 45 crew.

== 16 July ==
List of shipwrecks: 16 July 1942
Ship	State	Description
Beaconlight	Panama	World War II: The tanker was torpedoed and damaged in the Caribbean Sea north of Trinidad (10°59′N 61°05′W) by U-160 (Kriegsmarine) with the loss of one of her 41 crew. Survivors were rescued by Trinidad (Flag unknown). Beaconlight was scuttled by HMS Roode Zee (Royal Navy).
Bodry	Soviet Navy	World War II: The Gnevny-class destroyer was severely damaged at Poti in a Luftwaffe air raid.
Fairport	United States	World War II: Convoy AS 4: The Type C2-S-E1 cargo ship was torpedoed and sunk in the Atlantic Ocean (27°10′N 64°33′W) by U-161 (Kriegsmarine). All 123 people aboard were rescued by USS Kearny (United States Navy).
Gertrude	United States	World War II: The fishing vessel was shelled and sunk in the Gulf of Mexico 30 nautical miles (56 km) north of Havana, Cuba (23°32′N 82°00′W) by U-166 (Kriegsmarine). All three crew survived.
Gloucester City	United Kingdom	World War II: The cargo ship was shelled and sunk in the Atlantic Ocean by Michel (Kriegsmarine).
Komintern	Soviet Navy	World War II: The Bogatyr-class protected cruiser, previously damaged by airstrikes, was bombed and sunk at "Chopi" by the Luftwaffe.
Shtorm	Soviet Navy	World War II: The guard ship was severely damaged at Poti in a German air raid.
William F. Humphrey	United States	World War II: The cargo ship was torpedoed and sunk in the South Atlantic (5°37′S 0°56′E) by Michel (Kriegsmarine) with the loss of seven of her 47 crew. Eleven survivors were rescued by Triton (Norway), the rest were taken as prisoners of war.

== 17 July ==
List of shipwrecks: 17 July 1942
Ship	State	Description
Aramis	Norway	World War II: The tanker was torpedoed (Kriegsmarine) in the Atlantic Ocean (5°15′S 3°51′W) by Esau, then shelled and sunk by Michel (Kriegsmarine). Twenty-three of her 43 crew were taken aboard Michel as prisoners of war. Eighteen others reached the coast of Africa in a lifeboat. There is uncertainty about some possibly missing sailors.
Neptune	United States	The motorboat sank at Squaw Harbor, Territory of Alaska (55°14′30″N 160°32′55″W).
U-751	Kriegsmarine	World War II: The Type VIIC submarine was depth charged and sunk in the Atlantic Ocean off Cape Ortegal, Spain (45°14′N 12°22′W) by an Armstrong Whitworth Whitley and an Avro Lancaster aircraft of 61 and 502 Squadrons, Royal Air Force with the loss of all 48 crew.

== 18 July ==
List of shipwrecks: 18 July 1942
Ship	State	Description
Carmona	Panama	World War II: The cargo ship was torpedoed and sunk in the Atlantic Ocean (10°58′N 61°20′W) by U-160 (Kriegsmarine) with the loss of four of her 35 crew. Survivors were rescued by USS YPC-68 (United States Navy).
Comrade	United Kingdom	World War II: The schooner was shelled and sunk in the Atlantic Ocean (11°20′N 58°50′W) by U-575 (Kriegsmarine). Her crew survived.
Glacier	United Kingdom	World War II: The schooner was shelled and sunk in the Atlantic Ocean (10°50′N 58°58′W) by U-575 (Kriegsmarine). Her ten crew survived.
Hans	Germany	World War II: The auxiliary schooner struck a mine and sank in the North Sea off Heligoland.
Shch-138	Soviet Navy	World War II: The Shchuka-class submarine was destroyed at Nikolayevsk-on-Amur when one of her torpedoes exploded in the torpedo compartment. Seventeen of her crew were killed.
Unnamed	Flag unknown	World War II: The motorboat was captured by Partizans and sunk between Šibenik and Skradin, Yugoslavia.

== 19 July ==
List of shipwrecks: 19 July 1942
Ship	State	Description
Audi	Norway	World War II: The motor cutter was bombed and sunk at Honningsvåg by Ilyushin Il-4 aircraft of the Soviet Naval Air Force.
Baja California	Honduras	World War II: The cargo ship was torpedoed and sunk in the Gulf of Mexico 80 nautical miles (150 km) south south west of the Matanzas Pass (25°14′N 82°27′W) by U-84 (Kriegsmarine) with the loss of three of her 37 crew. Survivors were rescued by the fishing schooner San Ignacio (Cuba).
Empire Hawksbill	United Kingdom	World War II: Convoy OS 34: The Design 1019 ship was torpedoed and sunk in the Atlantic Ocean (42°29′N 25°56′W) by U-564 (Kriegsmarine) with the loss of all 47 crew.
Havørn	Norway	The cargo ship was in collision with Radhurst (United Kingdom) and sank in the Saint Lawrence River (47°23′09″N 70°27′07″W). Her nineteen crew survived.
USS Keshena	United States Navy	World War II: The tug struck a mine and sank in the Atlantic Ocean east of Ocracoke Island, North Carolina (35°00′N 75°45′W) while assisting J. A. Mowinckel (Panama), that had been torpedoed on 15 July. Two of her crew were killed.
Lavington Court	United Kingdom	World War II: Convoy OS 34: The cargo ship was torpedoed and damaged in the Atlantic Ocean (42°38′N 25°28′W) by U-564 (Kriegsmarine) with the loss of seven of the 48 people aboard, immediately after the loss of Empire Hawksbill to the same U-boat.Lavington Court was taken in tow, but foundered on 1 August (49°40′N 18°04′W). Survivors were rescued by HMS Wellington (Royal Navy). Lavington Court was on a voyage from a British port to Freetown, Sierra Leone.
Leonidas M.	Greece	World War II: The cargo ship was torpedoed and sunk in the Atlantic Ocean (37°01′N 52°04′W) by U-332 (Kriegsmarine). Her 31 crew survived; two of them were taken aboard U-332 as prisoners of war.
HMS Malines	Royal Navy	World War II: The auxiliary convoy escort vessel was torpedoed by Luftwaffe aircraft and beached near Port Said, Egypt. She was refloated in January 1943, used as a training hulk until the end of the war. She was scrapped unrepaired post-war.
Mary Ellen	United States	The fishing vessel was destroyed by fire at Hinchinbrook Island, Territory of Alaska.
Nevada II	United Kingdom	The cargo ship (5,693 GRT) ran aground 4 nautical miles (7.4 km) west of the Cairns of Coll (56°41′25″N 6°29′35″W). She was a total loss but here whole crew managed to reach safely the shore.
Port Antonio	Norway	World War II: The cargo ship was torpedoed and sunk in the Atlantic Ocean 48 nautical miles (89 km) off Cayo Jutías, Cuba (23°39′N 84°00′W) by U-129 (Kriegsmarine) with the loss of thirteen of her 24 crew.
Store Bill	Norway	World War II: The motor cutter was bombed and sunk at Honningsvåg by Ilyushin Il-4 aircraft of the Soviet Naval Air Force with the loss of all five crew.

== 20 July ==
List of shipwrecks: 20 July 1942
Ship	State	Description
Consul Horn	Germany	World War II: The cargo ship struck a mine, or bombed by British aircraft, and sank in the North Sea north east of Borkum.
F 156	Kriegsmarine	The Type A Marinefahrprahm was sunk on this date.
Frederika Lensen	United Kingdom	World War II: Convoy QS 19: The cargo ship was torpedoed and damaged in the Gulf of Saint Lawrence (49°22′N 65°12′W) by U-132 (Kriegsmarine) with the loss of four of her 46 crew. She was beached in Grand Vallée Bay but was declared a constructive total loss as her back was broken. Thirty-six survivors were rescued by HMCS Weyburn (Royal Canadian Navy), others landed at Grand Vallée Bay.
G. S. Livanos	Greece	World War II: The cargo ship was torpedoed and sunk in the Pacific Ocean 15 nautical miles (28 km) off Jervis Bay, Australia (35°00′S 151°00′E) by I-11 (Imperial Japanese Navy). All 31 crew survived.
Indus	United Kingdom	World War II: The cargo ship was sunk in the Indian Ocean south east of Mauritius (26°44′S 82°50′E) by Thor (Kriegsmarine) with the loss of 23 lives. Indus was on a voyage from Colombo, Ceylon to Fremantle, Western Australia.
Issa	Flag unknown	World War II: The steamship was captured by Partizans and sunk at Živogošće, Yugoslavia.
Süd	Germany	World War II: The cargo ship struck a mine and sank in the North Sea off Borkum.

== 21 July ==
List of shipwrecks: 21 July 1942
Ship	State	Description
Coast Farmer	United States	World War II: The cargo ship was torpedoed and sunk in the Pacific Ocean off New South Wales, Australia (36°23′S 151°00′E) by I-11 (Imperial Japanese Navy). One of her 41 crew was killed. Survivors were rescued by a Royal Australian Air Force crash boat.
Donovania	United Kingdom	World War II: The tanker was torpedoed and sunk in the Atlantic Ocean off Grand Matelot Point, Trinidad (10°56′N 61°10′W) by U-160 (Kriegsmarine) with the loss of five of her 50 crew. Survivors were rescued by USS Livermore (United States Navy) and Royal Navy motor torpedo boats.
HMMGB 328	Royal Navy	World War II: The Fairmile C motor gun boat was shelled and sunk in the Strait of Dover by Kriegsmarine surface ships.
William Cullen Bryant	United States	World War II: The Liberty ship was torpedoed and damaged in the Gulf of Mexico by U-84 (Kriegsmarine) and was abandoned by her 54 crew. She was later reboarded and taken in tow by Moran (United States) and USS Willett (United States Navy) and reached Key West, Florida on 23 July. William Cullen Bryant was later repaired. She returned to service in March 1944.

== 22 July ==
List of shipwrecks: 22 July 1942
Ship	State	Description
Ayatosan Maru	Imperial Japanese Navy	World War II: The troopship was bombed and sunk at Buna, New Guinea (8°50′S 148°50′E) by Boeing B-17 Flying Fortress and Martin B-26 Marauder aircraft of the United States Army Air Force with the loss of eight lives.
Città di Agrigento	Italy	World War II: The cargo ship was sunk in the Mediterranean Sea off Mersa Matruh, Egypt by Fairey Albacore aircraft of 820 Squadron, Fleet Air Arm.
Honolulan	United States	World War II: The Design 1033 ship was torpedoed and sunk in the Atlantic Ocean 400 nautical miles (740 km) south of the Cape Verde Islands, Portugal (8°41′N 22°12′W) by U-582 (Kriegsmarine). Her 39 crew were rescued by Winchester Castle (United Kingdom) on 28 July.
Roamar	Colombia	World War II: The coaster was shelled and sunk in the Atlantic Ocean by U-505 (Kriegsmarine).
Southern Seas	United States Army	The troopship struck an uncharted reef in the Taruia Pass whilst en route to Penrhyn Island. She was subsequently salvaged by the United States Navy, repaired and entered naval service on 23 December 1942.
Urious	Colombia	World War II: The schooner was shelled and sunk in the Caribbean Sea off Cayo Bolívar (12°24′N 81°28′W) by U-505 (Kriegsmarine) with the loss of 13 crew.
Vassiliki	Greece	World War II: The schooner was shelled and sunk in the Mediterranean Sea (34°45′N 34°35′E) by U-77 (Kriegsmarine). Her crew survived.
William Dawes	United States	World War II: The Liberty ship was torpedoed and sunk in the Pacific Ocean off Sydney, New South Wales, Australia (36°47′S 150°16′E) by I-11 (Imperial Japanese Navy) with the loss of five of the 58 people on board. One soldier and 4 gunners killed. The survivors had their lifeboats towed to shore by Australian fishing vessels.

== 23 July ==
List of shipwrecks: 23 July 1942
Ship	State	Description
Garmula	United Kingdom	World War II: The cargo ship was torpedoed and sunk in the Atlantic Ocean 200 nautical miles (370 km) south west of Freetown, Sierra Leone (5°32′N 14°45′W) by U-752 (Kriegsmarine) with the loss of 21 of her 88 crew. Survivors were rescued by HMT Pict (Royal Navy).
Harjus	Finnish Navy	World War II: Continuation War: The Kuha-class minesweeper was sunk off Hanko by a mine.
Onondaga	United States	World War II: The cargo ship was torpedoed and sunk in the Atlantic Ocean 5 nautical miles (9.3 km) north of Cayo Guillermo, Cuba (22°40′N 78°44′W) by U-129 (Kriegsmarine) with the loss of a passenger and nineteen of her 33 crew. Survivors were rescued by the fishing vessel Laventina (Cuba).

== 24 July ==
List of shipwrecks: 24 July 1942
Ship	State	Description
Fuku Maru No.5 GO	Imperial Japanese Navy	The auxiliary guard ship was sunk on this date.
HMMGB 601	Royal Navy	World War II: The Fairmile D motor torpedo boat sank at Dover, Kent after an explosion and fire, possibly from battle damage suffered on the night of 20–21 July.
Kofuji Maru	Japan	World War II: The cargo ship was sunk in the Pacific Ocean off the Kuril Islands by USS Narwhal (United States Navy).
Nissho Maru No.2	Japan	World War II: The cargo ship was sunk in the Pacific Ocean off the Kuril Islands by USS Narwhal (United States Navy).
Shinsei Maru No.83	Imperial Japanese Navy	World War II: The patrol boat was sunk in the Pacific Ocean off the Kuril Islands by USS Narwhal (United States Navy).
Toufic El Rahman	Syria	World War II: The sailing ship (30 GRT) was shelled and sunk in the Mediterranean Sea 30 nautical miles (56 km) east of Cape Greco, Crete, Greece by U-77 (Kriegsmarine). Her crew survived.
U-90	Kriegsmarine	World War II: The Type VIIC submarine was depth charged and sunk in the Atlantic Ocean (48°12′N 40°56′W) by HMCS St. Croix (Royal Canadian Navy) with the loss of all 44 crew.
Vettor Pisani	Italy	World War II: The cargo ship was torpedoed and damaged in the Mediterranean Sea (38°05′N 20°12′E) by HMS Unbeaten (Royal Navy). She was towed to Argostoli, Greece, where she was bombed, torpedoed and sunk by Royal Air Force aircraft.

== 25 July ==
List of shipwrecks: 25 July 1942
Ship	State	Description
British Merit	United Kingdom	World War II: Convoy ON 113: The tanker was torpedoed and damaged in the Atlantic Ocean 600 nautical miles (1,100 km) east of the Dominion of Newfoundland (49°03′N 40°36′W) by U-552 (Kriegsmarine). British Merit was towed in to Saint John's, Dominion of Newfoundland on 2 August. She was subsequently repaired and returned to service.
Broompark	United Kingdom	World War II: Convoy ON 113: The cargo ship was torpedoed and damaged in the Atlantic Ocean east of the Dominion of Newfoundland (49°02′N 40°26′W) by U-552 (Kriegsmarine) with the loss of four of her 42 crew. Survivors were rescued by HMCS Brandon (Royal Canadian Navy). Broompark was taken in tow by USS Cherokee (United States Navy) but foundered on 28 July (47°41′N 51°50′W).
HMT Laertes	Royal Navy	World War II: The Shakespearian-class naval trawler was torpedoed and sunk in the Atlantic Ocean off Freetown, Sierra Leone (6°00′N 14°17′W) by U-201 (Kriegsmarine) with the loss of fourteen of her crew.
Lucille M.	Canada	World War II: The fishing vessel was shelled and sunk in the Atlantic Ocean off Cape Sable Island, Nova Scotia (42°02′N 65°38′W) by U-89 (Kriegsmarine). Her eleven crew survived.
Maxine	United States	The fishing vessel was destroyed by fire at Hydaburg, Territory of Alaska.
RFA Tankexpress	Royal Fleet Auxiliary	World War II: The tanker was torpedoed, shelled, and sunk in the Atlantic Ocean south of the Cape Verde Islands, Portugal (10°05′N 26°31′W) by U-130 (Kriegsmarine). Her 39 crew were rescued by HMS Lightning (Royal Navy).
Telamon	Netherlands	World War II: The cargo ship was torpedoed and sunk in the Atlantic Ocean (9°15′N 59°54′W) by U-160 (Kriegsmarine) with the loss of 23 of her 37 crew. Survivors were rescued by Canadoc (United Kingdom).
Tjinegara	Netherlands	World War II: The livestock carrier was torpedoed and sunk in the Pacific Ocean 75 nautical miles (139 km) south west of Noumea, New Caledonia (23°10′S 165°00′E) by I-169 (Imperial Japanese Navy) with loss of all hands and all 400 horses aboard. 36 survivors, all the crew, were rescued by USS Worden (United States Navy).

== 26 July ==
List of shipwrecks: 26 July 1942
Ship	State	Description
Empire Rainbow	United Kingdom	World War II: Convoy ON 113: The CAM ship was torpedoed and sunk in the Atlantic Ocean (47°08′N 42°57′W) by U-607 and U-704 (both Kriegsmarine). Survivors were rescued by HMS Burnham (Royal Navy) and HMCS Dauphin (Royal Canadian Navy).
Oaxaca	Mexico	World War II: The cargo ship was torpedoed and sunk in the Gulf of Mexico off Corpus Christi, Texas, United States (28°23′N 96°08′W) by U-171 (Kriegsmarine) with the loss of six of her 45 crew.
Tamandaré	Brazil	World War II: The Design 1022 ship was torpedoed and sunk in the Caribbean Sea off Trinidad (11°34′N 60°30′W) by U-66 (Kriegsmarine) with the loss of four of her 49 crew. Survivors were rescued by USS PCC-492 (United States Navy).

== 27 July ==
List of shipwrecks: 27 July 1942
Ship	State	Description
Ellen Larsen	Germany	World War II: The cargo ship was shelled and damaged in the Baltic Sea south of Ventspils, Latvia by S-7 (Soviet Navy) and was beached.
Elmwood	United Kingdom	World War II: The cargo ship was torpedoed and sunk in the Atlantic Ocean (4°48′N 22°00′W) by U-130 (Kriegsmarine). Her 51 crew were rescued by Davy Crockett (United States).
Leikanger	Norway	World War II: The cargo ship was torpedoed and sunk in the Atlantic Ocean (approximately 4°N 18°W) by U-752 (Kriegsmarine) with the loss of eighteen of her 31 crew. Survivors were rescued by Harry Luckenbach (United States).
HMS MGB 501	Royal Navy	The motor gun boat sank off Land's End, Cornwall after an internal explosion.
Stella Lykes	United States	World War II: The cargo ship was torpedoed and sunk in the Atlantic Ocean 500 nautical miles (930 km) south of the Cape Verde Islands, Portugal (6°40′N 25°05′W) by U-582 (Kriegsmarine) with the loss of one of her 53 crew. Two survivors were taken aboard U-582 as prisoners of war.
No. 201	Soviet Navy	The Project 1125-class armored motor gunboat was sunk on this date.
No. 203	Soviet Navy	The Project 1125-class armored motor gunboat was sunk on this date.

== 28 July ==
List of shipwrecks: 28 July 1942
Ship	State	Description
Barbacena	Brazil	World War II: The cargo ship was torpedoed and sunk in the Atlantic Ocean (13°10′N 56°00′W) by U-155 (Kriegsmarine) with the loss of six of her 62 crew. Survivors were rescued by Elmdale, San Fabian (both United Kingdom) and Tacito (Argentina).
Cagou	Free France	World War II: The cargo ship was torpedoed and sunk in the Pacific Ocean north east of Sydney, New South Wales, Australia by I-175 (Imperial Japanese Navy) with the loss of all 39 crew.
Ebb	United States	World War II: The fishing trawler was shelled and sunk in the Atlantic Ocean 45 nautical miles (83 km) west of Cape Sable Island, Nova Scotia, Canada (43°18′N 63°50′W) by U-754 (Kriegsmarine) with the loss of five of her seventeen crew. Survivors were rescued by HMS Witherington (Royal Navy).
Piave	Brazil	World War II: The tanker was torpedoed, shelled and sunk in the Atlantic Ocean 100 nautical miles (190 km) off Barbados (12°30′N 55°49′W) by U-155 (Kriegsmarine) with the loss of one of her 35 crew.
Serafimovich	Soviet Navy	The auxiliary gunboat was sunk on this date.
Unidentified landing craft	German Army	World War II: The Siebel ferry was sunk by a Soviet mine in the Sea of Azov near Mariupol, Soviet Union.
V 202 Hermann Bösch	Kriegsmarine	World War II: The Vorpostenboot was shelled and sunk in the English Channel off La Hague, Manche, France by HMS Calpe, HMS Cottesmore and two motor gun boats (all Royal Navy). Twenty-five men were reported missing after the sinking.
V 203 Carl Röver	Kriegsmarine	World War II: The Vorpostenboot was shelled and set afire in the English Channel off La Hague by HMS Calpe, HMS Cottesmore and two motor gun boats (all Royal Navy). She put into Cherbourg, Seine-Inférieure, France Repairs would take a year to complete.
Weirbank	United Kingdom	World War II: The cargo ship was torpedoed and sunk in the Atlantic Ocean (11°29′N 58°51′W) by U-66 (Kriegsmarine) with the loss of one of her 67 crew.
Winston Salem	United States	World War II: Convoy PQ 17: The cargo ship was beached at Novaya Zemlya, Soviet Union.

== 29 July ==
List of shipwrecks: 29 July 1942
Ship	State	Description
Bill	Norway	World War II: The cargo ship was torpedoed and sunk in the Atlantic Ocean (11°58′N 55°02′W) by U-155 (Kriegsmarine) with the loss of one of her 24 crew. Her captain was taken aboard U-155 as a prisoner of war. Seven survivors were rescued by West Durfee (United States), the others reached land in their lifeboats.
Prescodoc	Canada	World War II: The cargo ship was torpedoed and sunk in the Atlantic Ocean north west of Georgetown, British Guiana (8°50′N 59°05′W) by U-160 (Kriegsmarine) with the loss of sixteen of her 21 crew. Survivors were rescued by Predsednik Kopajtic (Yugoslavia).

== 30 July ==
List of shipwrecks: 30 July 1942
Ship	State	Description
M 4008 Abeille 8	Kriegsmarine	World War II: The auxiliary minesweeper was bombed and sunk in the English Channel off the coast of Brittany, France by Allied aircraft.
Amina	Egypt	World War II: The sailing ship was shelled and sunk in the Mediterranean Sea 80 nautical miles (150 km; 92 mi) south of Cyprus by U-375 (Kriegsmarine).
Cranford	United States	World War II: The cargo ship was torpedoed and sunk in the Atlantic Ocean 250 nautical miles (460 km) east of Barbados (12°17′N 55°11′W) by U-155 (Kriegsmarine) with the loss of eleven of her 47 crew. Survivors were rescued by Castillo Alemenara (Spain).
Danmark	United Kingdom	World War II: The cargo ship was torpedoed and sunk in the Atlantic Ocean (7°00′N 24°19′W) by U-130 (Kriegsmarine). Her 46 crew were rescued by Mosli (Norway).
Fany	Egypt	World War II: The sailing ship was torpedoed and sunk in the Mediterranean Sea by U-77 (Kriegsmarine). Her ten crew survived.
Ferdinand Bol	Netherlands	The Design 1016 ship collided with Norse King (Norway) and sank in the Atlantic Ocean (45°21′N 59°28′W). Ferdinand Bol was on a voyage from Baltimore, Maryland, United States to Newport, Monmouthshire, United Kingdom.
Ikbal	Egypt	World War II: The sailing ship was shelled, rammed and sunk in the Mediterranean Sea 80 nautical miles (150 km) south of Cyprus by U-375 (Kriegsmarine).
Kathe	Germany	World War II: The cargo ship was torpedoed and sunk in the Baltic Sea off of Paulshafen (56°54′N 21°09′E) by S-7 (Soviet Navy).
Kōtoku Maru	Imperial Japanese Navy	World War II: The Kōtoku Maru-class ammunition ship was bombed by Boeing B-17 Flying Fortress aircraft of the 19th Bombardment Group, United States Army Air Force off Salamaua, New Guinea, and was abandoned. Her commanding officer was killed. Survivors were rescued by Yūzuki and Tatsuta (both Imperial Japanese Navy). Left afloat and uncrewed, she drifted until wrecked on the coast of New Guinea near Salamaua (07°01′N 147°07′E). Her wreck remained upright until sometime after 1945, she had rolled onto her side by the 1970s. By the 1980s only the stern was above water, the rest of the wreck was in 80 feet (24 m) of water.
Pacific Pioneer	United Kingdom	World War II: Convoy ON 113: The cargo ship was torpedoed and sunk in the Atlantic Ocean south west of Sable Island, Nova Scotia, Canada (43°30′N 60°35′W) by U-132 (Kriegsmarine). All 71 people aboard were rescued by HMCS Calgary (Royal Canadian Navy).
Robert E. Lee	United States	World War II: The passenger ship was torpedoed and sunk in the Gulf of Mexico 25 nautical miles (46 km) off the mouth of the Mississippi River (28°40′N 88°42′W) by U-166 (Kriegsmarine) with the loss of 25 of the 404 people aboard. Survivors were rescued by USS PC-566, USS SC-519 (both United States Navy) and Underwriter (United States).
San Clemente Maru	Japan	World War II: The tanker was torpedoed and sunk in the Pacific Ocean off the Caroline Islands by USS Grenadier (United States Navy).
U-166	Kriegsmarine	World War II: The Type IXC submarine was depth charged and sunk in the Gulf of Mexico (28°05′N 89°00′W) by USS PC-566 (United States Navy) with the loss of all 52 crew.
Uranus	Kriegsmarine	World War II: The netlayer was bombed sunk in the English Channel off the coast of Brittany by Allied aircraft.
No. 55	Soviet Navy	The No. 11-class landing tender was lost on Lake Ladoga on this date.
No. 56	Soviet Navy	The No. 16-class landing tender was lost on Lake Ladoga on this date.
No. 67	Soviet Navy	The No. 16-class landing tender was lost on Lake Ladoga on this date.
No. 71	Soviet Navy	The No. 11-class landing tender was lost on Lake Ladoga on this date.
No. 75	Soviet Navy	The No. 11-class landing tender was lost on Lake Ladoga on this date.
No. 83	Soviet Navy	The No. 11-class landing tender was lost on Lake Ladoga on this date.
No. 97	Soviet Navy	The No. 16-class landing tender was lost on Lake Ladoga on this date.
No. 105	Soviet Navy	The No. 11-class landing tender was lost on Lake Ladoga on this date.
No. 106	Soviet Navy	The No. 16-class landing tender was lost on Lake Ladoga on this date.

== 31 July ==
List of shipwrecks: 31 July 1942
Ship	State	Description
USS Grunion	United States Navy	World War II: The Gato-class submarine was shelled and damaged in the Pacific Ocean more than 2,000 feet (610 m) north of McArthur Reef, Kiska, Alaska Territory (52°14′16″N 177°25′05″E) by Kano Maru (Imperial Japanese Navy), she probably sank as a result of loss of control during subsequent dive and was crushed with the loss of all 60 crew.
Kasima Maru	Japan	World War II: The cargo ship was torpedoed and severely damaged by USS Grunion (United States Navy) and was beached at Kiska, Alaska Territory. She was destroyed on 8 August in an American air attack
Kano Maru	Imperial Japanese Navy	World War II: The Komaki Maru-class auxiliary transport was torpedoed and damaged by USS Grunion (United States Navy), with only one of three torpedoes that hit actually detonating, off Kiska. She was towed to Kiska Harbor, and remained there until she was driven ashore and wrecked by a storm on 22 September 1942 1 1/2 miles (2.4 km) southwest of Kiska Harbor.
KL-13	Soviet Navy	The auxiliary river gunboat (129 GRT) of the Onega military flotilla sank in a storm 2 miles west of Vasilisin Island with all 31 hands.
U-213	Kriegsmarine	World War II: The Type VIID submarine was sunk in the Atlantic Ocean east of the Azores, Portugal (36°45′N 26°50′W) by HMS Erne, HMS Rochester, and HMS Sandwich (all Royal Navy) with the loss of all 50 crew.
U-588	Kriegsmarine	World War II: The Type VIIC submarine was depth charged and sunk in the Atlantic Ocean north east of the Dominion of Newfoundland (49°59′N 36°36′W) by HMCS Skeena and HMCS Wetaskiwin (both Royal Canadian Navy) with the loss of all 46 crew.
U-754	Kriegsmarine	World War II: The Type VIIC submarine was depth charged and sunk in the Atlantic Ocean south east of Yarmouth, Nova Scotia, Canada (43°02′N 64°52′W) by a Lockheed Hudson aircraft of 113 Squadron, Royal Canadian Air Force with the loss of all 43 crew.

== Unknown date ==
List of shipwrecks: Unknown date 1942
Ship	State	Description
Kama	Soviet Navy	World War II: Battle of Someri: The gunboat was sunk by Finnish Air Force aircraft sometime between 8 and 11 July.
HMS LCA 196	Royal Navy	The Landing Craft, Assault was lost.
HMS LCM 140	Royal Navy	The Landing Craft, Medium was lost.
New Deal	United States	The fishing vessel was destroyed by fire in Wide Bay, Territory of Alaska (57°22′N 156°11′W).
Saldary	Turkish Navy	The submarine foundered in the Dardanelles off Chanak, Turkey, with 57 crew aboard.
