= MS J. A. Mowinckel =

1930 oil tanker

History

Panama
- Name: MS J. A. Mowinckel
- Owner: Panama Transport Co
- Operator: Panama Transport Co
- Port of registry: Panama City, Panama
- Completed: 1930
- In service: 27 July 1930
- Out of service: 23 April 1954
- Fate: Scrapped

General characteristics
- Class & type: Oil Tanker
- Tonnage: GRT - 11,147 DWT - 12,323
- Displacement: 52,310 tonnes
- Length: 540 ft (164.6 m)
- Beam: 70 ft (21.3 m)
- Depth: 39 ft (11.9 m)
- Propulsion: Two three-blade wing propellers and one centre propeller
- Speed: 12.5 knots
- Capacity: Barrels of Oil - 139,765 barrels

MS J. A. Mowinckel was an oil tanker built in Monfalcone, Italy, in 1930. The vessel was registered under the Panamanian flag and operated by the Panama Transport Co., a subsidiary of the Standard Oil Company of New Jersey.

During the Second World War, the vessel was damaged but not sunk during German submarine operations off the United States coast in 1942. It was torpedoed by the German submarine U-576 during Operation Drumbeat in the Battle of the Atlantic.

The vessel was named after John A. Mowinckel, a director of Standard Oil Company of New Jersey and head of its European operations. The ship had four sister vessels—F. H. Bedford Jr., Peter Hurll, Heinrich v. Riedemann, and J. H. Senior—all named after Standard Oil executives.

The tanker had a gross register tonnage of 11,147 and a deadweight tonnage of 12,323 tons. It measured approximately 540 × 70 × 39 ft and could carry up to 139,765 barrels of cargo. Its home port was Panama City, and its master during the events described was Harold Griffiths.

- Home Port: Panama City, R.P.
- Company: Panama Transport Co.
- Master: Harold Griffiths
- Built: Monfalcone, Italy (1930)
- DWT: 12,323
- Dimensions: 540' × 70' × 39'
- Cargo Capacity: 139,765 barrels

== War-period incidents ==
On 15 July 1942, J. A. Mowinckel was sailing as the lead vessel in Convoy KS-520 from New York to the Standard Oil refinery at Aruba. The vessel was carrying fresh water and dry cargo but no oil at the time.

During the voyage, the ship was struck by a torpedo fired by the German submarine U-576, commanded by Hans-Dieter Heinicke. The explosion occurred approximately 8 ft below the waterline near the stern, damaging the engine room, steering gear, galley, messrooms, and aft gun platform.

Aerial view of the torpedoed and grounded MS J. A. Mowinckel

While attempting to reach safety near Hatteras Inlet, the vessel entered a U.S. defensive minefield and suffered a second explosion near the starboard side tanks.

There were 46 merchant seamen and 13 members of the U.S. Naval Armed Guard aboard. One merchant crewman and one U.S. Navy gunner later died of wounds, while ten merchant crew and four Navy personnel were injured.

During the same action, U-576 surfaced within the convoy and was attacked by the merchant ship Unicoi and two U.S. Navy OS2U Kingfisher aircraft of squadron VS-9. The submarine was sunk with all 45 crew lost.

== Miramar Ship Index data ==
The following technical and service data are derived from the Miramar Ship Index.

ID No.	5607116
Year	1930
Name	J. A. MOWINCKEL
Type	Tanker
Launch date	27 July 1930
Completion	November 1930
Flag	Panama

DWT	12,323
Builder	Riuniti Adriatico
Yard No.	236
Country of build	Italy
Location	Monfalcone
Speed	12.5 knots

== Salvage and repair ==
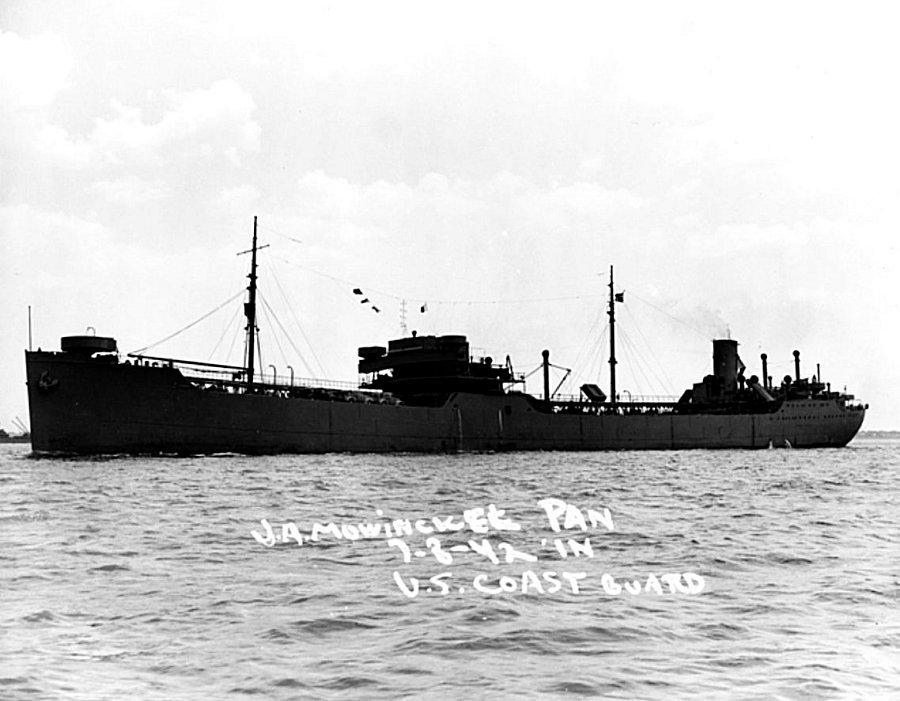
MS J. A. Mowinckel inbound for repairs, July 1942

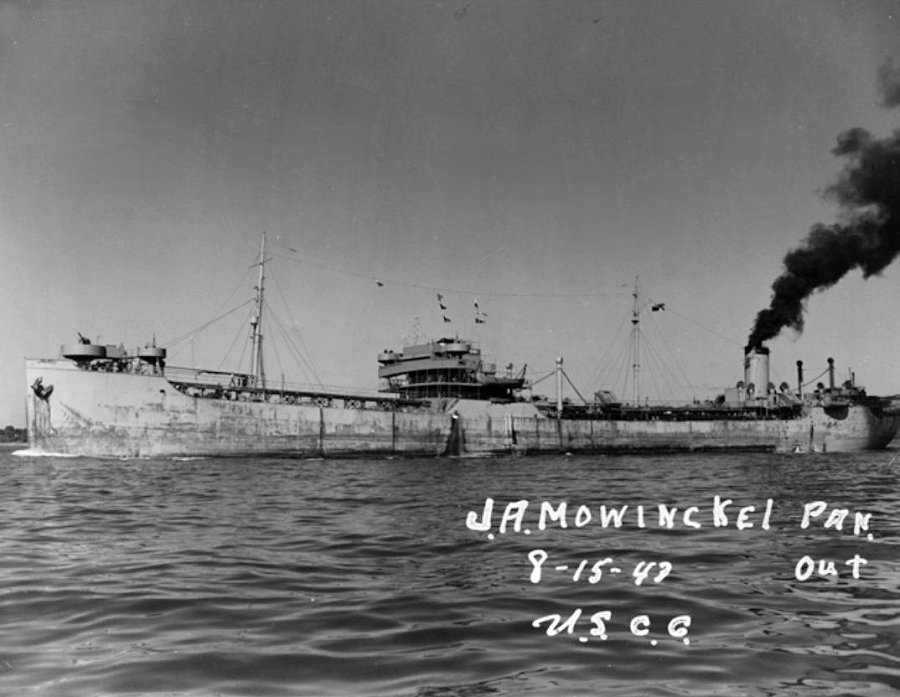
MS J. A. Mowinckel outbound after repairs, August 1943

After being torpedoed and mined, the vessel was beached on 16 July 1942 and abandoned in lifeboats. Two boats reached Ocracoke Inlet, while the remaining survivors were rescued by U.S. Coast Guard vessels.

The tanker was refloated after pumping operations and towed for temporary repairs before permanent repairs were completed by March 1943. The vessel then returned to service and sailed for Aruba.

== History and later service ==
Constructed and delivered in November 1930 to Baltisch-Amerikanische Petroleum Import GmbH of Danzig. Ownership transferred to Panama Transport Co. in 1935.

According to the Miramar Ship Index, the vessel was renamed Orionis (1950), Seacastle (1951), Audacious (1951), and Platanos (1953). It was scrapped at Blyth on 23 April 1954.
