= SS Pennsylvania Sun =

Oil tanker

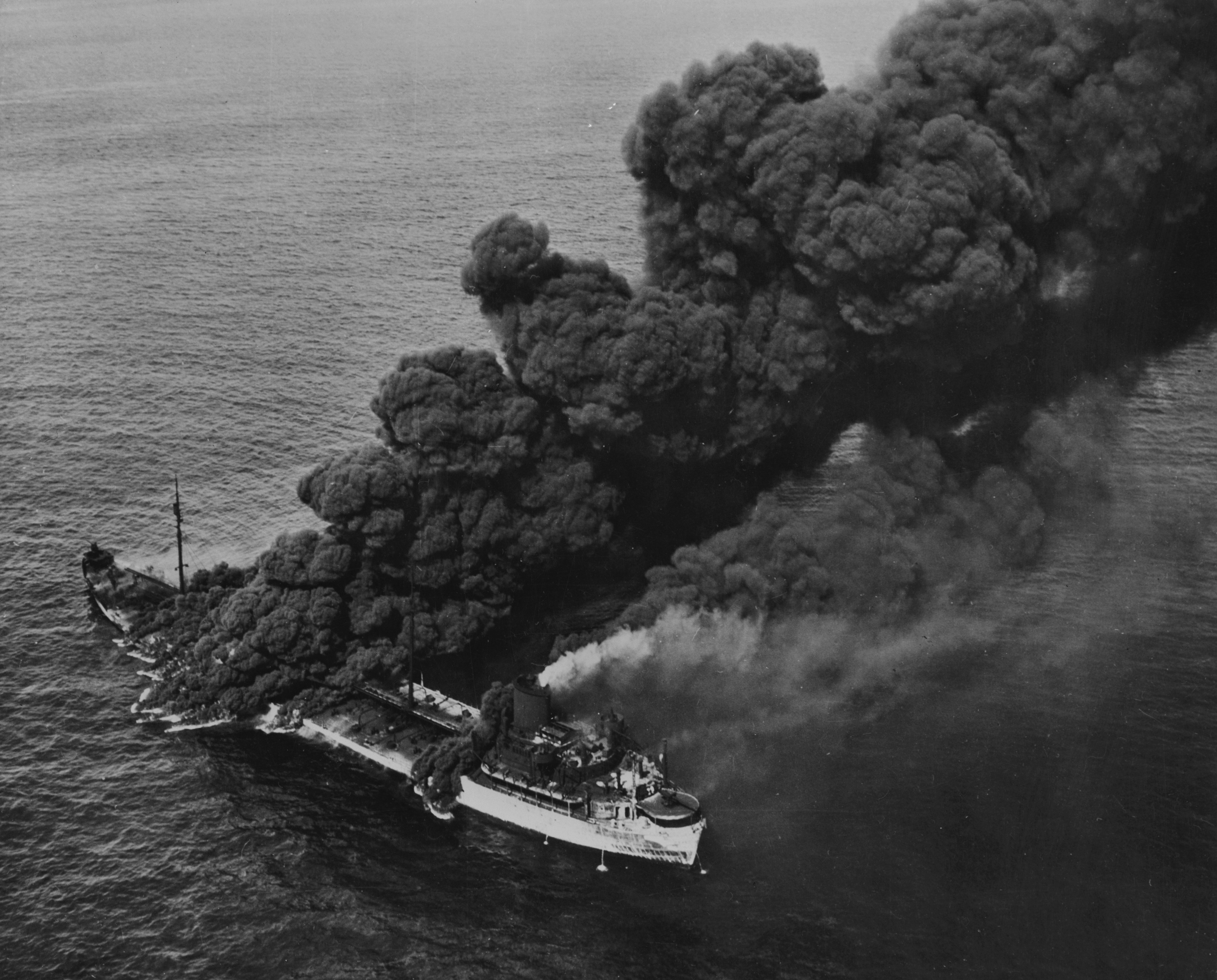
- SS Pennsylvania Sun after being torpedoed by U-571 on 15 July 1942

History

United States
- Name: SS Pennsylvania Sun (1938-1955); SS Stephanitor (1955-1963)
- Owner: Sun Oil Company
- Port of registry: Philadelphia, United States
- Route: Port Arthur, Texas - Belfast
- Builder: Sun Shipbuilding & Dry Dock Co.
- Yard number: 168
- Laid down: 19 August 1937
- Launched: 20 May 1938
- Completed: 13 July 1938
- In service: 13 July 1938
- Out of service: February 1963
- Fate: Scrapped 1963

General characteristics
- Type: Tanker
- Tonnage: 11.373 GRT
- Propulsion: Screw propeller
- Speed: 14 knots
- Crew: 60
- Armament: 1 x 5 inch .30cal guns; 1 X 3 inch .30cal guns; 4 x 20mm .30cal guns; 2 x .30cal guns

SS Pennsylvania Sun was a United States tanker that was damaged by U-571, 125 miles (201 km) West of Key West, Florida in the Gulf of Mexico, while traveling from Port Arthur, Texas, to Belfast, United Kingdom (24°05′N 83°42′W). She was repaired and went back in service in 1943, she was eventually scrapped in 1963.

== Construction ==
SS Pennsylvania Sun was laid down on 19 August 1937 at the Sun Shipbuilding & Dry Dock Co. shipyard in Chester, Pennsylvania. She was launched on 20 May 1938 and completed on 13 July 1938. The ship was assessed at 11.373 GRT and had a single screw propeller.

== U-571 Attack ==
Pennsylvania Sun was traveling from Port Arthur, Texas to Belfast, with 107.500 barrels of Navy fuel oil on 15 July 1942. At 7:49am, the U-571 fired one torpedo at the unescorted Pennsylvania Sun while the ship was steaming on a zigzag course at 14 knots 125 miles (201 km) West of Key West, Florida in the Gulf of Mexico (24°05′N 83°42′W). The torpedo struck amidships on the port side between the tanks number 5 and 6. The torpedo also blew away the port wing of the bridge, killing quartermaster James B. Mortimer and able seaman John C. Riley. The ship's cargo ignited and the ship quickly became an inferno.

The master of Pennsylvania Sun, Frederick Lyall steered for five minutes southeast at full speed and then ordered the engines to be stopped while a distress signal was sent. The ship's remaining nine officers, 33 crewmen and 17 armed guards abandoned ship in three lifeboats, rowed away and put out sea anchors to wait for a rescue vessel. They were picked up by USS Dahlgren after three and one-half hours and taken to Key West the same day. There were 57 survivors of which several crew and Armed Guard injured, and 2 crew were lost.

The next evening, the ship's master, three officers and the crew of USS Willet returned to Pennsylvania Sun, when a patrol aircraft reported that the ship was still afloat and the fire had abated. They extinguished the remaining flames and towed her to Key West, where temporary repairs were made and the bodies of the 2 deceased crew members were removed from the ship and buried at their home towns. The tanker steamed under her own power with her crew to Chester, Pennsylvania and returned to service after the permanent repairs were completed in 1943.

== Later service and end ==
Pennsylvania Sun remained with the Sun Oil Company until she was sold in 1955 to the German company D. Oltmann & Co. and renamed SS Stephanitor. In 1960, the ship was converted to an ore carrier. The ship was finally scrapped at La Spezia in February 1963 after 25 years of service and surviving a torpedo strike and fire.
