= U-571 =

U-571 may refer to:

- German submarine U-571, a German submarine during World War II
- U-571 (film), a fictional war film, about a submarine, released in 2000
