= German submarine U-582 =

German World War II submarine

History

Nazi Germany
- Name: U-582
- Ordered: 8 January 1940
- Builder: Blohm & Voss, Hamburg
- Yard number: 558
- Laid down: 25 September 1940
- Launched: 12 June 1941
- Commissioned: 7 August 1941
- Fate: Sunk on 5 October 1942

General characteristics
- Class & type: Type VIIC submarine
- Displacement: 769 tonnes (757 long tons) surfaced; 871 t (857 long tons) submerged
- Length: 67.10 m (220 ft 2 in) o/a; 50.50 m (165 ft 8 in) pressure hull
- Beam: 6.20 m (20 ft 4 in) o/a; 4.70 m (15 ft 5 in) pressure hull
- Height: 9.60 m (31 ft 6 in)
- Draught: 4.74 m (15 ft 7 in)
- Installed power: 2,800–3,200 PS (2,100–2,400 kW; 2,800–3,200 bhp) (diesels); 750 PS (550 kW; 740 shp) (electric)
- Propulsion: 2 shafts; 2 × diesel engines; 2 × electric motors
- Speed: 17.7 knots (32.8 km/h; 20.4 mph) surfaced; 7.6 knots (14.1 km/h; 8.7 mph) submerged
- Range: 8,500 nmi (15,700 km; 9,800 mi) at 10 knots (19 km/h; 12 mph) surfaced; 80 nmi (150 km; 92 mi) at 4 knots (7.4 km/h; 4.6 mph) submerged
- Test depth: 230 m (750 ft); Crush depth: 250–295 m (820–968 ft)
- Complement: 4 officers, 40–56 enlisted
- Armament: 5 × 53.3 cm (21 in) torpedo tubes (four bow, one stern); 14 × torpedoes or 26 TMA mines; 1 × 8.8 cm (3.46 in) deck gun (220 rounds); 1 x 2 cm (0.79 in) C/30 AA gun

Service record
- Part of: 5th U-boat Flotilla; 7 August – 31 December 1941; 1st U-boat Flotilla; 1 January – 5 October 1942
- Identification codes: M 46 477
- Commanders: K.Kapt. Werner Schulte; 7 August 1941 – 5 October 1942
- Operations: 4 patrols: 1st patrol: 3 January – 7 February 1942; 2nd patrol: 19 March – 24 May 1942; 3rd patrol: 22 June – 11 August 1942; 4th patrol: 14 September – 5 October 1942
- Victories: 6 merchant ships sunk (38,826 GRT); 1 warship sunk (46 tons)

German submarine U-582 was a Type VIIC U-boat of Nazi Germany's Kriegsmarine during World War II.

She carried out four patrols, sank six ships of 38,826 GRT and sank a warship of 46 tons (lost aboard a transport ship).

The boat was sunk by depth charges from a US aircraft, southwest of Iceland on 5 October 1942.

== Design ==
German Type VIIC submarines were preceded by the shorter Type VIIB submarines. U-582 had a displacement of 769 tonnes (757 long tons) when at the surface and 871 tonnes (857 long tons) while submerged. She had a total length of 67.10 m (220 ft 2 in), a pressure hull length of 50.50 m (165 ft 8 in), a beam of 6.20 m (20 ft 4 in), a height of 9.60 m (31 ft 6 in), and a draught of 4.74 m (15 ft 7 in). The submarine was powered by two Germaniawerft F46 four-stroke, six-cylinder supercharged diesel engines producing a total of 2,800 to 3,200 metric horsepower (2,060 to 2,350 kW; 2,760 to 3,160 shp) for use while surfaced, two Brown, Boveri & Cie GG UB 720/8 double-acting electric motors producing a total of 750 metric horsepower (550 kW; 740 shp) for use while submerged. She had two shafts and two 1.23 m (4 ft) propellers. The boat was capable of operating at depths of up to 230 metres (750 ft).

The submarine had a maximum surface speed of 17.7 knots (32.8 km/h; 20.4 mph) and a maximum submerged speed of 7.6 knots (14.1 km/h; 8.7 mph). When submerged, the boat could operate for 80 nautical miles (150 km; 92 mi) at 4 knots (7.4 km/h; 4.6 mph); when surfaced, she could travel 8,500 nautical miles (15,700 km; 9,800 mi) at 10 knots (19 km/h; 12 mph). U-582 was fitted with five 53.3 cm (21 in) torpedo tubes (four fitted at the bow and one at the stern), fourteen torpedoes, one 8.8 cm (3.46 in) SK C/35 naval gun, 220 rounds, and a 2 cm (0.79 in) C/30 anti-aircraft gun. The boat had a complement of between forty-four and sixty.

== Service history ==
The submarine was laid down on 25 September 1940 at Blohm & Voss, Hamburg as yard number 558, launched on 12 June 1941 and commissioned on 7 August under the command of Korvettenkapitän Werner Schulte.

She served with the 5th U-boat Flotilla from 7 August 1941 for training and the 1st U-boat Flotilla for operations until her loss, from 1 January until 5 October 1942.

=== First patrol ===
U-582's first patrol was preceded by a diversion to Trondheim in Norway to replace the stud bolts of her exhaust valves. She left the Nordic port on 3 January 1942 and headed for the Atlantic Ocean via the gap separating the Faroe and Shetland Islands. A lookout broke an arm in bad weather on the tenth, but she sank the Refast on the 26th off St. Johns.

She arrived at Brest in occupied France, on 7 February.

=== Second patrol ===
Her second foray took her to the US east coast, but the pickings were thin, she returned to Brest on 24 May 1942 without any successes.

=== Third patrol ===
She sank the Port Hunter on 12 July 1942 370 nautical miles (690 km; 430 mi) west southwest of Madeira. The ship had been carrying ammunition and depth charges as well as HMNZS ML-1090, a 46-tons patrol craft being taken from Britain to New Zealand as deck cargo. Debris from the exploding ship was found on the U-boat's casing.

She also sank the Empire Attendant a few days later (15 July) southwest of the Canary Islands.

When she sank the Honolulan on 22 July 400 nautical miles (740 km; 460 mi) south of the Cape Verde Islands, the vessel went down with her steam whistle still sounding, some two hours after being hit.

U-582 disposed of the Stella Lykes 500 nautical miles (930 km; 580 mi) south of Fogo in the Cape Verde Islands on 27 July 1942 with seven demolition charges placed by a boarding party in the abandoned ship. The U-boat had fired two torpedoes and 161 rounds from her deck gun but she remained afloat. The master and chief engineer were taken prisoner; the ship sank by the stern.

=== Fourth patrol and loss ===
The submarine left Brest for the last time on 14 September 1942. On the 23rd, she sank the Vibran about 400 nautical miles (740 km; 460 mi) north northeast of the Azores.

She was sunk on 5 October 1942 by depth charges dropped by a US PBY Catalina from VP-73 southwest of Iceland.

Forty-six men died with U-582; there were no survivors.

== Previously recorded fate ==
U-582 was sunk on 5 October 1942 by a British Lockheed Hudson of No. 269 Squadron RAF. It was later ascertained that this attack sank U-619.

== Wolfpacks ==
U-582 took part in five wolfpacks, namely:

- Zieten (15 – 22 January 1942)
- Hai (3 – 21 July 1942)
- Blitz (22 – 26 September 1942)
- Tiger (26 – 30 September 1942)
- Luchs (1 – 5 October 1942)

== Summary of raiding history ==
Date	Ship Name	Nationality	Tonnage (Note: Merchant ship tonnages are in gross register tons. Military vessels are listed by tons displacement.)	Fate
26 January 1942	Refast	United Kingdom	5,189	Sunk
12 July 1942	Port Hunter	United Kingdom	8,826	Sunk
12 July 1942	HMNZS ML-1090 (Note: Being carried aboard the Port Hunter.)	Royal New Zealand Navy	46	Sunk
15 July 1942	Empire Attendant	United Kingdom	7,524	Sunk
22 July 1942	Honolulan	United States	7,493	Sunk
27 July 1942	Stella Lykes	United States	6,801	Sunk
23 September 1942	Vibran	Norway	2,993	Sunk

== Bibliography ==
- Busch, Rainer; Röll, Hans-Joachim (1999). German U-boat commanders of World War II : a biographical dictionary. Translated by Brooks, Geoffrey. London, Annapolis, Md: Greenhill Books, Naval Institute Press. ISBN 1-55750-186-6.
- Busch, Rainer; Röll, Hans-Joachim (1999). Der U-Boot-Krieg, 1939-1945: Deutsche U-Boot-Verluste von September 1939 bis Mai 1945 [German U-boat losses from September 1939 to May 1945] (in German). Vol. IV. Hamburg, Berlin, Bonn: Mittler. ISBN 3-8132-0514-2.
- Gröner, Eric; Jung, Dieter; Maass, Martin (1991). German Warships 1815-1945: U-boats and Mine Warfare Vessels. Vol. 2. Translated by Thomas, Keith; Magowan, Rachel. London: Conway Maritime Press. ISBN 0-85177-593-4.
- Kemp, Paul (1997). U-Boats Destroyed – German Submarine Losses in the World Wars. Arms & Armour. ISBN 1-85409-515-3.
