= SS Juvenal =

History

Argentina
- Name: Juvenal
- Namesake: Juvenal
- Owner: Cia General de Combustibles (1928–68); Transmaritima del Plata Cia de Nav SAC (1968–72)
- Port of registry: Buenos Aires
- Builder: Cantiere Navale Triestino
- Yard number: 200
- Launched: 3 June 1928
- Completed: August 1928
- Identification: code letters NSOP (1932–33); call sign LOFU (1934 onward); IMO number 5177901 (from 1969)
- Fate: Scrapped 1972

General characteristics
- Type: oil tanker
- Tonnage: 13,247 GRT (until 1933); 13,896 GRT (from 1934); tonnage under deck 12,331 (until 1933); 7,934 NRT (until 1933); 7,920 NRT (from 1934); 18,425 DWT
- Length: 556.0 ft (169.5 m)
- Beam: 74.1 ft (22.6 m)
- Draught: 29 ft 2 in (8.89 m)
- Depth: 40.3 ft (12.3 m)
- Installed power: 1,167 NHP
- Propulsion: triple-expansion steam engines; twin screws
- Sensors & processing systems: wireless direction finding (from 1934); echo sounding device (1934–35)
- Notes: Largest merchant ship on the Argentinian registry when built

SS Juvenal was an oil tanker that was built in Italy in 1928 and registered in Argentina. When built she was the largest ship in the Argentinian registry.

== Building ==
Cantiere Navale Triestino built Juvenal in Monfalcone, near Trieste, Italy, launching her on 3 June 1928 and completing her in August. She was 556.0 ft (169.5 m) long, had a beam of 74.1 ft (22.6 m) and a draught of 29 ft 2 in (8.89 m). As built her tonnages were 13,247 GRT and 7,934 NRT.

Juvenal was only slightly smaller than the tanker C.O. Stillman, which was then the largest in the World and had been completed in Bremen that February.

Juvenal had 15 corrugated furnaces that heated five boilers with a combined heating surface of 17,735 square feet (1,648 m^{2}). They supplied steam at 200 lb_{f}/in^{2} to a pair of triple expansion engines built by the North East Marine Engineering Co Ltd of Sunderland, England. Between them the engines developed a total of 1,167 NHP and propelled her by twin screws.

== Career ==
Juvenal was built for the Compañia General de Combustibles, who owned her until 1968.

In 1932 Juvenal was assigned the code letters NSOP. In 1934 these were superseded by the call sign LOFU. Also in 1934 the ship was fitted with wireless direction finding equipment and an echo sounding device, and her tonnages were revised slightly to 13,896 GRT and 7,920 NRT. The echo sounder seems to have been removed in 1935. In 1936 Juvenal was still Argentina's largest merchant ship.

In the Second World War off the northern coast of Brazil Juvenal rescued a survivor from Bank Line's 5,154 GRT cargo ship Oakbank, which U-507 had sunk by torpedo on 27 December 1942. Juvenal was bound for Curaçao in the Netherlands Antilles, where she put the survivor ashore on 8 January.

In 1968 Juvenal's ownership passed to the Transmaritima del Plata Compañia de Naviera SAC. She was scrapped in December 1972.<ref name=Miramar/

== See also ==
- SS Tacito, a tanker built for Compañia General de Combustibles in 1924

== Bibliography ==
- Talbot-Booth, EC (1936). Ships and the Sea (Third ed.). London: Sampson Low, Marston & Co Ltd. p. 327.
