= SS Nicholas Cuneo =

Merchant ship from Honduras

History
- Name: Nicholas Cuneo
- Owner: Empresa Hondurena De Vapores
- Port of registry: Puerto Cortés, Honduras
- Route: New Orleans - Havana
- Builder: Framnæs Mekaniske Værksted - FMV - (Framnæs) A/S
- Yard number: 65
- Completed: April 1907
- In service: 1907
- Fate: Shelled and sunk 9 July 1942

General characteristics
- Type: Cargo ship
- Tonnage: 1,051 GRT
- Length: 65.8 metres (215 ft 11 in)
- Beam: 9.2 metres (30 ft 2 in)
- Depth: 6.1 metres (20 ft 0 in)
- Installed power: 1 x 3-cyl. triple expansion engine
- Propulsion: Screw propeller
- Speed: 11.5 knots
- Crew: 20

SS Nicholas Cuneo was a Honduran Cargo ship that was shelled and sunk by U-571, 47 nautical miles (87 km) North of Havana in the Gulf of Mexico, while travelling from New Orleans, United States to Havana, Cuba (23°54′N 82°33′W).

== Construction ==
SS Nicholas Cuneo was constructed in 1907 at the Framnæs Mekaniske Værksted - FMV - (Framnæs) A/S shipyard in Sandefjord, Norway. She was completed in April 1907 and named Nicholas Cuneo. The ship was 65.8 metres (215 ft 11 in) long, with a beam of 9.2 metres (30 ft 2 in) and a depth of 6.1 metres (20 ft 0 in). She was assessed at 1.051 GRT and had one 3-cyl. triple expansion engine driving a single screw propeller. The engine was rated at 132 nhp.

== Early history ==
Nicholas Cuneo changed owners a number of times during her service years. She was first owned by the Norwegian company Avance D/S from April 1907 to February 1934, after that she was transferred to another Norwegian company Skibs-A/S Aramis where she served until March 1936 when she was sold to the Norwegian company L.A. Larsen. In December 1939 the ship was sold to Empresa Hondurena de Vapores, where she remained until her demise in 1942.

== Sinking ==
Nicholas Cuneo was travelling from New Orleans, United States to Havana, Cuba on 9 July 1942. At 16:01, the German submarine U-571 surfaced to investigate the ship according to the prize rules after spotting a blue-white-blue flag. The U-boat tried to stop the unescorted and unarmed Nicholas Cuneo by firing three rounds from her 20mm AA deck gun over the ship.

The vessel however turned away at full speed and sent distress signals, whereupon the next rounds were fired directly at the hull of Nicholas Cuneo. The crew immediately stopped the engines and abandoned ship in one of the ships lifeboats, but one Cuban crew member named Ernesto Balara Lobo was lost. U-571 fired 43 shells from the deck gun at Nicholas Cuneo. The ship soon caught fire and the submarine submerged quickly and left the area due to an aircraft arriving at the scene. The 19 survivors were picked up a few hours later by the Nicaraguan steam merchant Corinto and were taken to Havana. The destroyer USS Noa investigated the still burning Nicholas Cuneo later that day and reported her being beyond salvage with 26 shell holes visible and a list of 30° to port. The ship subsequently sank at 20.44pm that same day.

== Wreck ==
The wreck lies 47 nautical miles (87 km) north of Havana in the Gulf of Mexico at (23°54′N 82°33′W).
