= German submarine U-576 =

German World War II submarine

History

Nazi Germany
- Name: U-576
- Ordered: 8 January 1940
- Builder: Blohm & Voss, Hamburg
- Yard number: 552
- Laid down: 1 August 1940
- Launched: 30 April 1941
- Commissioned: 26 June 1941
- Fate: Sunk on 15 July 1942

General characteristics
- Class & type: Type VIIC submarine
- Displacement: 769 tonnes (757 long tons) surfaced; 871 t (857 long tons) submerged
- Length: 67.10 m (220 ft 2 in) o/a; 50.50 m (165 ft 8 in) pressure hull
- Beam: 6.20 m (20 ft 4 in) o/a; 4.70 m (15 ft 5 in) pressure hull
- Height: 9.60 m (31 ft 6 in)
- Draught: 4.74 m (15 ft 7 in)
- Installed power: 2,800–3,200 PS (2,100–2,400 kW; 2,800–3,200 bhp) (diesels); 750 PS (550 kW; 740 shp) (electric)
- Propulsion: 2 shafts; 2 × diesel engines; 2 × electric motors
- Speed: 17.7 knots (32.8 km/h; 20.4 mph) surfaced; 7.6 knots (14.1 km/h; 8.7 mph) submerged
- Range: 8,500 nmi (15,700 km; 9,800 mi) at 10 knots (19 km/h; 12 mph) surfaced; 80 nmi (150 km; 92 mi) at 4 knots (7.4 km/h; 4.6 mph) submerged
- Test depth: 230 m (750 ft); Crush depth: 250–295 m (820–968 ft)
- Complement: 4 officers, 40–56 enlisted
- Armament: 5 × 53.3 cm (21 in) torpedo tubes (four bow, one stern); 14 × torpedoes or 26 TMA mines; 1 × 8.8 cm (3.46 in) deck gun (220 rounds); 1 x 2 cm (0.79 in) C/30 AA gun

Service record
- Identification codes: M 44 117
- Commanders: Kptlt. Hans-Dieter Heinicke; 26 June 1941 – 15 July 1942
- Operations: 5 patrols: 1st patrol: a. 6 October – 5 November 1941; b. 8 – 12 November 1941; 2nd patrol: 11 – 23 December 1941; 3rd patrol: 20 January – 28 February 1942; 4th patrol: 29 March – 16 May 1942; 5th patrol: 16 June – 15 July 1942
- Victories: 4 merchant ships sunk (15,450 GRT); 2 merchant ships damaged (19,457 GRT)
- U-576 and Bluefields (shipwrecks and remains)
- U.S. National Register of Historic Places
- Nearest city: Hatteras, North Carolina
- MPS: World War II Shipwrecks along the East Coast and Gulf of Mexico MPS
- NRHP reference No.: 15000864
- Added to NRHP: 8 December 2015

German submarine U-576 was a Type VIIC U-boat of Nazi Germany's Kriegsmarine during World War II. She carried out five patrols, sinking four ships of 15,450 gross register tons (GRT) and damaging two more of 19,457 GRT. She was sunk on 15 July 1942 by depth charges from two US aircraft and gunfire from a merchant ship, near the East Coast of the United States. The wreck was discovered in August 2014.

== Design ==
German Type VIIC submarines were preceded by the shorter Type VIIB submarines. U-576 had a displacement of 769 tonnes (757 long tons) when at the surface and 871 tonnes (857 long tons) while submerged. She had a total length of 67.10 m (220 ft 2 in), a pressure hull length of 50.50 m (165 ft 8 in), a beam of 6.20 m (20 ft 4 in), a height of 9.60 m (31 ft 6 in), and a draught of 4.74 m (15 ft 7 in). The submarine was powered by two Germaniawerft F46 four-stroke, six-cylinder supercharged diesel engines producing a total of 2,800 to 3,200 metric horsepower (2,060 to 2,350 kW; 2,760 to 3,160 shp) for use while surfaced, two Brown, Boveri & Cie GG UB 720/8 double-acting electric motors producing a total of 750 metric horsepower (550 kW; 740 shp) for use while submerged. She had two shafts and two 1.23 m (4 ft) propellers. The boat was capable of operating at depths of up to 230 metres (750 ft).

The submarine had a maximum surface speed of 17.7 knots (32.8 km/h; 20.4 mph) and a maximum submerged speed of 7.6 knots (14.1 km/h; 8.7 mph). When submerged, the boat could operate for 80 nautical miles (150 km; 92 mi) at 4 knots (7.4 km/h; 4.6 mph); when surfaced, she could travel 8,500 nautical miles (15,700 km; 9,800 mi) at 10 knots (19 km/h; 12 mph). U-576 was fitted with five 53.3 cm (21 in) torpedo tubes (four fitted at the bow and one at the stern), fourteen torpedoes, one 8.8 cm (3.46 in) SK C/35 naval gun, 220 rounds, and a 2 cm (0.79 in) C/30 anti-aircraft gun. The boat had a complement of between forty-four and sixty men.

== Service history ==
Laid down on 1 August 1940 at Blohm & Voss, Hamburg at yard number 552, the submarine was launched on 30 April 1941. She was commissioned on 26 June under the command of Kapitänleutnant Hans-Dieter Heinicke.

U-576 trained in the 7th U-boat Flotilla, and stayed with that flotilla for operations from 1 September 1941 until her loss on 15 July 1942.

=== First and second patrols ===
U-576's first patrol was from Kirkenes in Norway. She headed for the Barents Sea and swept the area off the Kola Peninsula. No encounters were reported.

On her second patrol, she sailed into the Atlantic Ocean through the gap separating the Faroe and Shetland Islands. She arrived at St. Nazaire in occupied France on 23 December 1941, without incident.

=== Third patrol ===
Leaving St. Nazaire on 20 January 1942, the U-576 sank the Empire Spring, a catapult armed merchantman or CAM ship, on 14 February, southeast of Sable Island, off Nova Scotia. The Empire Spring's entire crew of 55 died in the sinking.

=== Fourth patrol ===
As one of the boats involved in Operation Drumbeat (U-boat operations off the eastern seaboard of the North America), U-576 sank the Pipestone County on 21 April 1942, 475 nautical miles (880 km; 547 mi) east of Cape Henry, Virginia. All 46 of the Pipestone County's crewmen survived. The submarine surfaced, Heinicke apologized to the Pipestone County's crew for sinking their ship, and U-576's crew gave provisions to the men in one of the lifeboats. On 30 April 1942, the U-576 sank the Norwegian vessel Taborfjell 95 nautical miles (176 km; 109 mi) east of Cape Cod. The merchant ship went down in just one minute, with the loss of 17 of her 20 crewmen.

=== Fifth patrol and loss ===
The boat set out from St. Nazaire for the last time on 16 June 1942, heading for the U.S. Atlantic seaboard to participate in Operation Drumbeat. During the first half of July, she sighted an Allied convoy but was unable to attack it. The U-576 was plagued with engine trouble, and on 13 or 14 July, an aircraft attack damaged one of her ballast tanks, hampering her ability to dive and surface, and Heinicke signaled that the damage could not be repaired at sea. On the 29th day of the patrol, Heinicke signaled that he was heading east on the surface in moderate seas and had made 16 nautical miles that day. It was the U-576's last signal.

On 15 July 1942 off the coast of North Carolina, the U-576 encountered Convoy KS-520, which consisted of 19 merchant ships and five escorts steaming from Hampton Roads, Virginia, to Key West, Florida. She fired four torpedoes; one hit and sank the Nicaraguan cargo ship Bluefields, one hit and damaged the American cargo ship Chilore that then struck an Allied mine whilst under tow and sank off Cape Henry, while the other two hit the Panamanian tanker J. A. Mowinckel, damaging her. After firing the torpedoes, the U-576 unintentionally surfaced in the middle of the convoy, prompting one of the convoy's ships, the Unicoi, to open fire on her and two United States Navy Vought OS2U Kingfisher aircraft to attack her with depth charges, one of which was seen to land on her deck and roll overboard before exploding. The U-576 sank, leaving a large pool of oil on the surface. All 45 crewmen on U-576 died; there were no survivors.

=== Discovery ===
U-576 off North Carolina Coast

In 2009, the U.S. National Oceanic and Atmospheric Administration's Office of Ocean Exploration and Research, the University of North Carolina's Coastal Studies Institute, and the United States Department of the Interior's Bureau of Ocean Energy Management launched a joint effort to find the wreck of U-576. An unsuccessful attempt to locate the sunken vessel off Cape Hatteras was documented in the National Geographic Channel's 2013 television documentary Hitler's Secret Attack on America. In October 2014, NOAA announced the submarine had been located using sonar in August 2014 during an expedition conducted by NOAA's Office of Marine Sanctuaries. Her wreck lies 30 miles off Cape Hatteras and about 240 yards (220 meters) from the wreck of Bluefields. On 8 December 2015 the wrecks of U-576 and Bluefields were placed on the National Register of Historic Places.

On 24 August 2016, during a series of dives in two-person submersibles from the 146-foot (45-meter) vessel Baseline Explorer, scientists working in partnership with Project Baseline, the University of North Carolina Coastal Studies Institute, and SRI International made the first visual observations of U-576 since her sinking in 1942. They found that her wreck was lying on its side at a depth of 721 feet (220 meters) with her hatches dogged shut, her dive planes angled upward as if the submarine was attempting to surface, and damage to her outer hull near the bow. Her wooden deck had rotted away, but her hull, conning tower, and deck gun (the latter inscribed with the nickname "Peterle," German for "Little Peter") were largely intact. The scientists also visited the wreck of Bluefields. NOAA made plans to conduct an underwater laser scan of both wrecks and produce exact three-dimensional models of them.

Under maritime law, the wreck of U-576 is the property of the German government. The United States Government has agreed to care for it. Presumably, her entire crew of 45 men is entombed within her hull.

== Summary of raiding history ==
Date	Name	Nationality	Tonnage (GRT)	Fate
14 February 1942	Empire Spring	United Kingdom	6,946	Sunk
21 April 1942	Pipestone County	United States	5,102	Sunk
30 April 1942	Taborfjell	Norway	1,339	Sunk
15 July 1942	Bluefields	Nicaragua	2,063	Sunk
15 July 1942	Chilore	United States	8,310	Damaged
15 July 1942	J.A. Mowinckel	Panama	11,147	Damaged

== Bibliography ==
- Busch, Rainer; Röll, Hans-Joachim (1999). German U-boat commanders of World War II: a biographical dictionary. Translated by Brooks, Geoffrey. London, Annapolis, Md: Greenhill Books, Naval Institute Press. ISBN 1-55750-186-6.
- Busch, Rainer; Röll, Hans-Joachim (1999). Der U-Boot-Krieg, 1939-1945: Deutsche U-Boot-Verluste von September 1939 bis Mai 1945 [German U-boat losses from September 1939 to May 1945] (in German). Vol. IV. Hamburg, Berlin, Bonn: Mittler. ISBN 3-8132-0514-2.
- Gröner, Eric; Jung, Dieter; Maass, Martin (1991). German Warships 1815-1945: U-boats and Mine Warfare Vessels. Vol. 2. Translated by Thomas, Keith; Magowan, Rachel. London: Conway Maritime Press. ISBN 0-85177-593-4.
- Kemp, Paul (1997). U-Boats Destroyed - German Submarine Losses in the World Wars. Arms & Armour. ISBN 1-85409-515-3.
