= SS Tacito =

History

Argentina
- Name: Tacito (1924–63); Astranorte (1963–65)
- Namesake: Tacitus (1924–63)
- Owner: Cia General de Combustibles (1924–59); Trans-Ona srl (1959–63); Astramar Cia Argentina de Nav SAC (1963–65)
- Port of registry: Buenos Aires
- Builder: Northumberland Shipbuilding Company
- Yard number: 264
- Launched: 29 October 1924
- Completed: December 1924
- Identification: code letters HBDS (1932–33); call sign LCGF (1934 onward)
- Fate: Scrapped 1965

General characteristics
- Type: Oil tanker
- Tonnage: 8,331 GRT; tonnage under deck 6,366; 4,749 NRT; 11,306 DWT
- Length: 430.0 ft (131.1 m)
- Beam: 57.0 ft (17.4 m)
- Draught: 26 ft 1 in (7.95 m)
- Depth: 33.1 ft (10.1 m)
- Installed power: 626 NHP
- Propulsion: triple-expansion steam engine; single screw

SS Tacito was an oil tanker that was built in England in 1924 and registered in Argentina. In 1963 she was renamed Astranorte.

== Building ==
The Northumberland Shipbuilding Company built Tacito in Howdon on the north bank of the River Tyne in England, launching her on 28 October 1924 and completing her that December. She was 430.0 ft (131.1 m) long, had a beam of 57.0 ft (17.4 m) and draught of 26 ft 1 in (7.95 m). Her tonnages were 8,331 GRT and 4,749 NRT.

Tacito had 12 corrugated furnaces that heated three boilers with a combined heating surface of 9,672 square feet (899 m^{2}). They supplied steam at 180 lb_{f}/in^{2} to a triple expansion engine built by the Wallsend Slipway Co Ltd. Between them the engines developed a total of 626 NHP and propelled her by a single screw.

== Career ==
Juvenal was built for the Compañia General de Combustibles, who owned her until 1959. In 1932 she was assigned the code letters HBDS. In 1934 these were superseded by the call sign LCGF.

On 28 July 1942 off the coast of British Guiana the German submarine U-155 torpedoed the Brazilian cargo ship Barbacena. Tacito was one of three ships who rescued survivors.

On 24 July 1943 off the east coast of Brazil U-172 torpedoed the cargo ship Fort Chilcotin, a Canadian-built Fort ship chartered by the UK Ministry of War Transport. 53 of her crew survived in two lifeboats. Tacito picked them up at 0930 hrs on 29 July and landed them at Rio de Janeiro on 1 August.

In 1959 ownership of Juvenal passed to Trans-Orna srl. In 1963 it passed to Astramar Compañia Argentina de Naviera SAC, who renamed her Astranorte. On 1 August 1965 Astranorte arrived in Rosario to be scrapped.

== See also ==
- SS Juvenal, a tanker built for Compañia General de Combustibles in 1928
