= USS Willet =

Minesweeper of the United States Navy

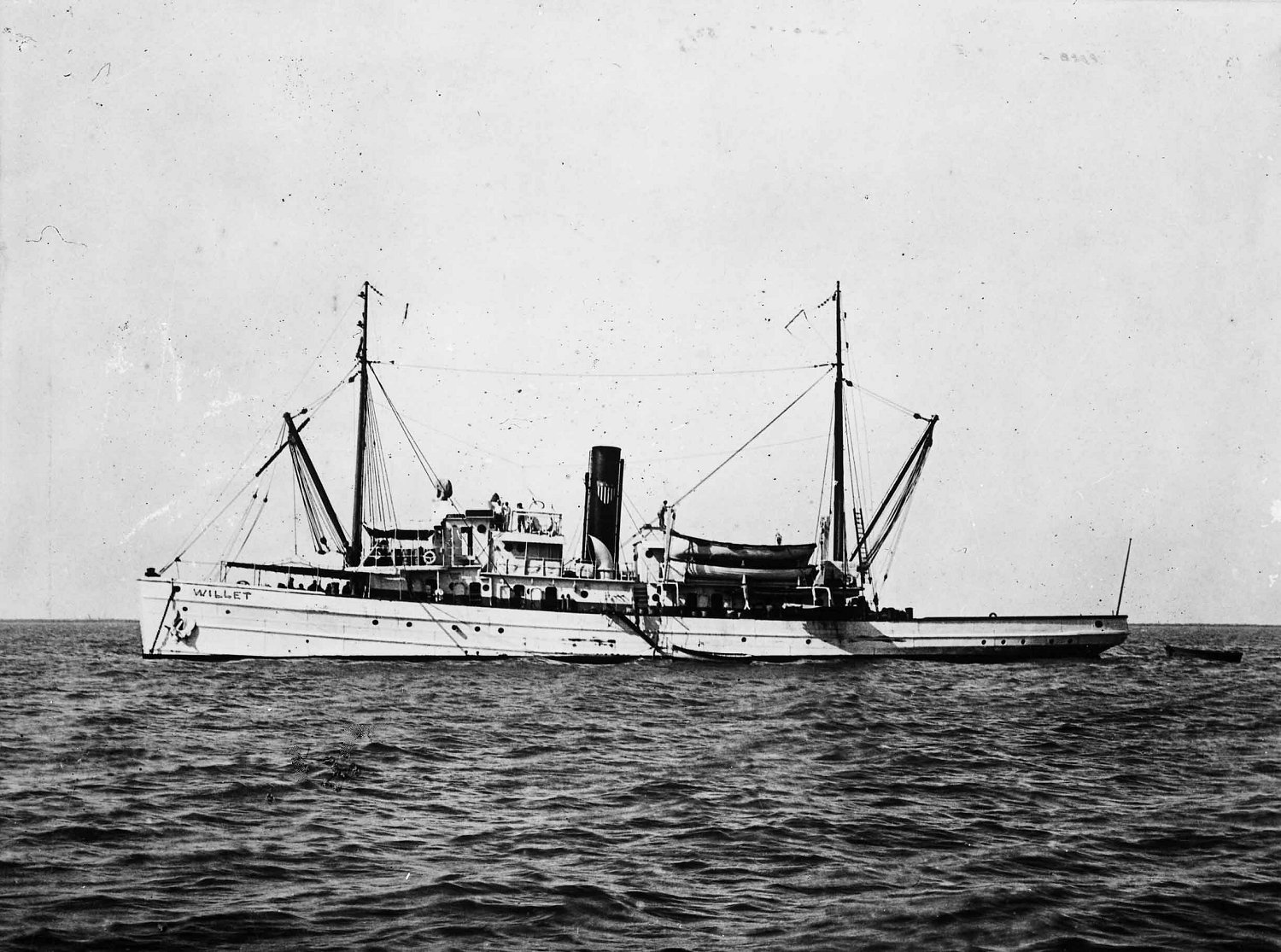

History

United States
- Laid down: 26 May 1919
- Launched: 11 September 1919
- Commissioned: 29 January 1920
- Decommissioned: 29 May 1920
- In service: as ARS-12, 13 September 1941
- Out of service: 1 December 1947
- Stricken: 5 December 1947
- Fate: Sold for scrap 2 November 1948

General characteristics
- Displacement: 840 tons
- Length: 187 ft 10 in (57.25 m)
- Beam: 35 ft 5 in (10.80 m)
- Draught: 8 ft 10 in (2.69 m)
- Propulsion: triple expansion reciprocating steam engine, two Babcock & Wilcox boilers, one shaft.
- Speed: 14 kts
- Complement: 85
- Armament: two 3 in (76 mm) gun mounts

USS Willet (AM-54) was a Lapwing-class minesweeper commissioned by the United States Navy for service after World War I. Willet's task was to clear mines from minefields laid in combat areas by enemy forces.

Willet (Minesweeper No. 54 ) was laid down on 19 May 1919 at the Philadelphia Navy Yard; launched on 11 September 1919, sponsored by Miss Caroline Chantry, the daughter of Comdr. A. J. Chantry, CC; and commissioned on 29 January 1920.

== World War I-related operations ==
After brief service with the Atlantic Fleet Train Willet was decommissioned on 29 May 1920 and simultaneously transferred, on loan, to the United States Shipping Board.

== World War II operations ==
She operated with the civilian firm of Merritt, Chapman, and Scott through World War II. (During the 1920s and 1930s, she was based at the Merritt, Chapman, and Scott salvage depot in New York City before being shifted to Key West, Florida, from which point she operated during World War II.)

== Reclassified as salvage vessel ==
Classified as a salvage vessel on 13 September 1941 and simultaneously redesignated ARS-12. Willet operated in the Caribbean and Gulf of Mexico through the end of hostilities. She assisted stranded or grounded vessels, fought fires on burning ships, and escorted coastwise convoy runs.

== Post-war activity ==
Declared surplus to naval needs on 1 December 1947, Willet was struck from the Navy list on 5 December 1947. Although listed as "disposed of" as of 6 July 1948 subsequent records indicate that the ship lay berthed at the Navy Net Depot at Melville, Rhode Island, into the late fall of 1948. She was berthed in a shallow water anchorage not normally used by active vessels and served as a breakwater protecting other ships of the Atlantic Reserve Fleet berthed at Melville. On 2 November 1948, the erstwhile minesweeper and salvage vessel was delivered to her purchaser, Joseph Demaso, of Miami, Florida, and scrapped soon thereafter.
