= German submarine U-571 =

German World War II submarine

History

Nazi Germany
- Name: U-571
- Ordered: 24 October 1939
- Builder: Blohm & Voss, Hamburg
- Yard number: 547
- Laid down: 8 June 1940
- Launched: 4 April 1941
- Commissioned: 22 May 1941
- Fate: Sunk on 28 January 1944

General characteristics
- Class & type: Type VIIC submarine
- Displacement: 769 tonnes (757 long tons) surfaced; 871 t (857 long tons) submerged; 1,070 tonnes (1,050 long tons) total
- Length: 67.10 m (220 ft 2 in) o/a; 50.50 m (165 ft 8 in) pressure hull
- Beam: 6.20 m (20 ft 4 in) o/a; 4.70 m (15 ft 5 in) pressure hull
- Draught: 4.74 m (15 ft 7 in)
- Installed power: 2,800–3,200 PS (2,100–2,400 kW; 2,800–3,200 bhp) (diesels); 750 PS (550 kW; 740 shp) (electric)
- Propulsion: 2 shafts; 2 × diesel engines; 2 × electric motors
- Speed: 17.7 knots (32.8 km/h; 20.4 mph) surfaced; 7.6 knots (14.1 km/h; 8.7 mph) submerged
- Range: 8,500 nmi (15,700 km; 9,800 mi)at 10 knots (19 km/h; 12 mph) surfaced; 80 nmi (150 km; 92 mi) at 4 knots (7.4 km/h; 4.6 mph) submerged
- Test depth: 220 m (720 ft)
- Complement: 4 officers, 40–52 enlisted
- Armament: 5 × 53.3 cm (21 in) torpedo tubes (four bow, one stern); 14 × torpedoes or 26 TMA mines; 1 × 8.8 cm (3.46 in) deck gun (220 rounds); 1 x 2 cm (0.79 in) C/30 AA gun

Service record
- Part of: 3rd U-boat Flotilla; 22 May 1941 – 28 January 1944
- Identification codes: M 42 483
- Commanders: Kptlt. Helmut Möhlmann; 22 May 1941 – 31 May 1943; Oblt.z.S. Gustav Lüssow; 31 May 1943 – 28 January 1944
- Operations: 11 patrols: 1st patrol: a. 18 – 27 August 1941; b. 28 August – 5 September 1941; c. 18 – 19 October 1941; 2nd patrol: 22 October – 26 November 1941; 3rd patrol: 21 December 1941 – 27 January 1942; 4th patrol: 10 March – 7 May 1942; 5th patrol: 11 June – 7 August 1942; 6th patrol: 3 October – 14 November 1942; 7th patrol: 22 December 1942 – 19 February 1943; 8th patrol: a. 22 – 23 March 1943; b. 25 March – 1 May 1943; 9th patrol: 8 June – 1 September 1943; 10th patrol: 26 – 28 December 1943; 11th patrol: 8–28 January 1944
- Victories: 5 merchant ships sunk (33,511 GRT); 1 merchant ship total loss (9,788 GRT); 1 auxiliary warship total loss (3,870 GRT); 1 merchant ship damaged (11,394 GRT)

German submarine U-571 was a Type VIIC U-boat built for the Kriegsmarine of Nazi Germany for service during World War II. U-571 conducted eleven war patrols, sinking five ships totalling 33,511 gross register tons (GRT), and damaging one other for 11,394 GRT. On 28 January 1944 she was attacked by an Australian-crewed Sunderland aircraft from No. 461 Squadron RAAF west of Ireland and was destroyed by depth charges. All hands were lost.

The fictional 2000 U.S. war film U-571 has no relation to this U-boat, but is very loosely based on the British capture of U-110 and her Enigma and cipher keys.

== Design ==
German Type VIIC submarines were preceded by the shorter Type VIIB submarines. U-571 had a displacement of 769 tonnes (757 long tons) when at the surface and 871 tonnes (857 long tons) while submerged. She had a total length of 67.10 m (220 ft 2 in), a pressure hull length of 50.50 m (165 ft 8 in), a beam of 6.20 m (20 ft 4 in), a height of 9.60 m (31 ft 6 in), and a draught of 4.74 m (15 ft 7 in). The submarine was powered by two Germaniawerft F46 four-stroke, six-cylinder supercharged diesel engines producing a total of 2,800 to 3,200 metric horsepower (2,060 to 2,350 kW; 2,760 to 3,160 shp) for use while surfaced, two Brown, Boveri & Cie GG UB 720/8 double-acting electric motors producing a total of 750 metric horsepower (550 kW; 740 shp) for use while submerged. She had two shafts and two 1.23 m (4 ft) propellers. The boat was capable of operating at depths of up to 230 metres (750 ft).

The submarine had a maximum surface speed of 17.7 knots (32.8 km/h; 20.4 mph) and a maximum submerged speed of 7.6 knots (14.1 km/h; 8.7 mph). When submerged, the boat could operate for 80 nautical miles (150 km; 92 mi) at 4 knots (7.4 km/h; 4.6 mph); when surfaced, she could travel 8,500 nautical miles (15,700 km; 9,800 mi) at 10 knots (19 km/h; 12 mph). U-571 was fitted with five 53.3 cm (21 in) torpedo tubes (four fitted at the bow and one at the stern), fourteen torpedoes, one 8.8 cm (3.46 in) SK C/35 naval gun, 220 rounds, and a 2 cm (0.79 in) C/30 anti-aircraft gun. The boat had a complement of between forty-four and sixty.

== Service history ==
Her keel was laid down on 8 June 1940 by Blohm & Voss of Hamburg. She was commissioned on 22 May 1941 with Kapitänleutnant Helmut Möhlmann in command. Under his command U-571 had nine successful patrols in the Arctic and in the North and Central Atlantic. In August and September 1941, U-571 operated against Allied and Soviet forces, damaging the Soviet passenger vessel Marija Uljanova on 26 August.

In 1942, U-571 operated off the east coast of the United States, sinking the British cargo ship Hertford on 29 March, the Norwegian tanker M/T Koll on 6 April off Cape Hatteras, and the American freighter Margaret on April 14 after the ship left San Juan, Puerto Rico. Although U-571’s log mentions that some of the 8 officers and 21 men managed to get into a lifeboat and onto rafts, none of Margaret’s crew was ever seen again. In July 1942 the submarine operated in the Caribbean and torpedoed four ships: the British freighter Umtata on 7 July, the American tanker, J. A. Moffett, Jr. on 8 July, the Honduran freighter Nicholas Cuneo on 9 July and on 15 July the American tanker, Pennsylvania Sun.

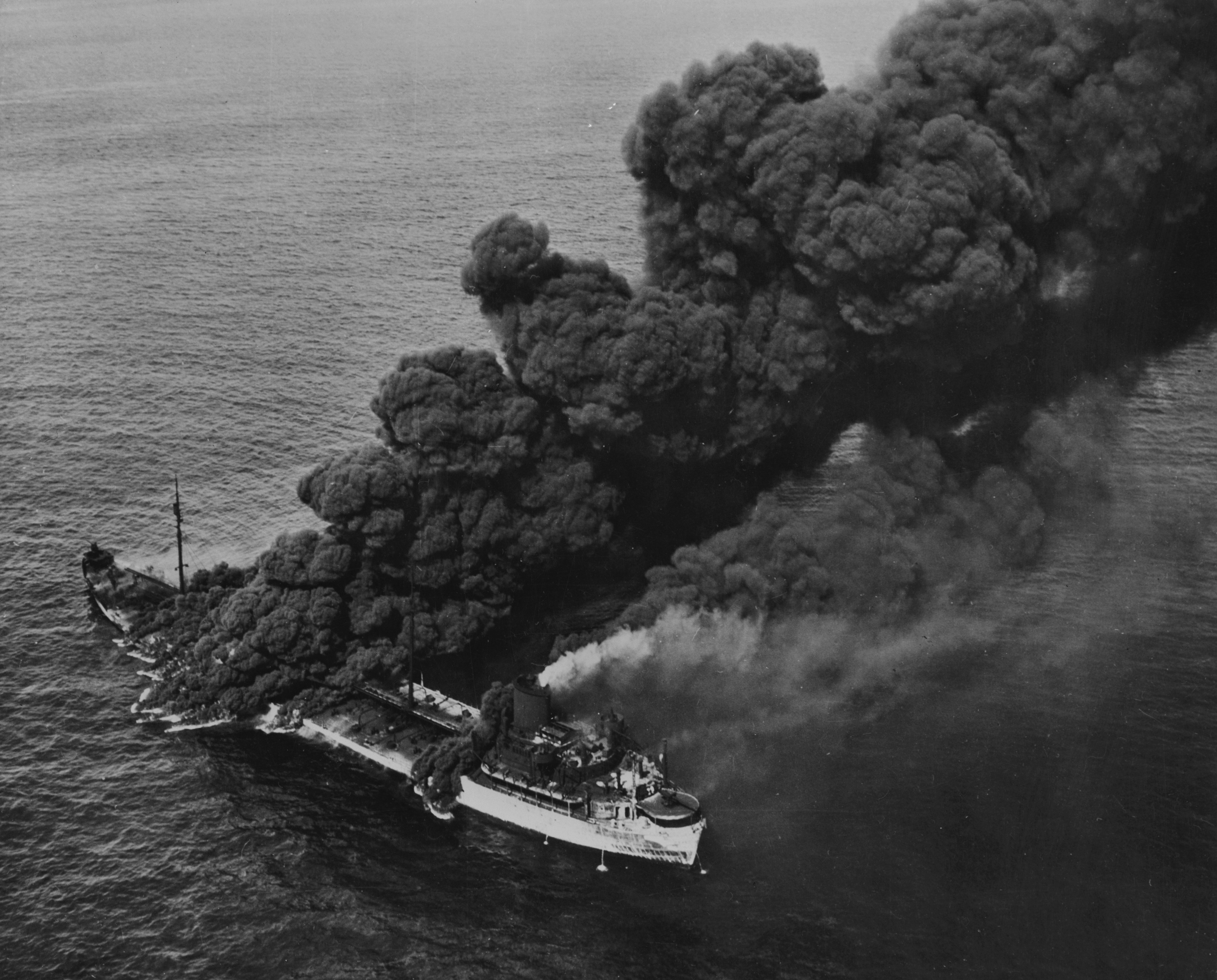
The tanker Pennsylvania Sun, torpedoed by U-571 on 15 July 1942 (was saved and returned to service in 1943)

The whole crew of J. A. Moffett, Jr. (35 merchant marine and 5 Naval Armed Guard) abandoned ship into two lifeboats and three rafts, except for the master who was killed. The United States Coast Guard vessels Mary Jean and Southbound picked up the 39 survivors and brought them to Florida. When Pennsylvania Sun was torpedoed, two of the merchant crew died in the resulting explosion, but the rest of the 40 merchant marine crew and the 17 members of the Naval Armed Guard aboard survived after being rescued by USS Dahlgren. Pennsylvania Sun was later salvaged and returned to service, while the other three ships attacked in July were sunk.

On 22 March 1943, U-571 was attacked by an aircraft in the North Atlantic and was damaged and had to return to base. In April 1943, Möhlmann claimed that he sank three additional ships but these could not be matched with records of Allied losses. On 22 April 1943, she had to return to base because the commander was badly injured in an accident on the conning tower. On 2 May 1943, Möhlmann was relieved by Oberleutnant zur See Gustav Lüssow. U-571 patrolled off the west coast of Africa in July before returning to base on 1 September. Between September and December, U-571 was probably being overhauled in a drydock as no mention of the boat for that time period appears in war diary kept by the German Commander in Chief, Submarines, Admiral Karl Dönitz.

On 18 January 1944, Lüssow reported to his submarine command that he attacked and sank an unknown destroyer. This could not, however, be identified with any known Allied losses during World War II.

=== Fate ===
On 28 January 1944 she was attacked by an Australian captained Sunderland aircraft from No. 461 Squadron RAAF west of Ireland and was destroyed by depth charges. The aircraft's captain, Flight Lieutenant R. D. Lucas, reported that most of the crew successfully abandoned ship, but soon died from hypothermia. A dinghy was dropped but failed to open. U-571 sank with all hands – 52 dead – at 52°41′N 14°27′W. She had not, until her loss, suffered any casualties to her crew during her entire career. The plane, EK577 (callsign "D for Dog"), was crewed partly by Royal Air Force (RAF) personnel and was based at RAF Pembroke Dock, in Wales. The crew was Lucas, Sergeant (Sgt) J. R. Brannan (RAF, a Canadian), Flight Sergeant (F/Sgt) W. J. Darcey, Sgt D. Musson (RAF), F/Sgt S. T. Burnett, Sgt D. McWalker (RAF), Flying Officer (F/O) H. D. Roberts, F/Sgt G. H. Simmonds (RAF), F/O R. H. Prentice, and F/Sgt C. D. Bremner.

=== Wolfpacks ===
U-571 took part in 14 wolfpacks, namely:

- Stosstrupp (30 October – 4 November 1941)
- Raubritter (4 – 17 November 1941)
- Störtebecker (17 – 22 November 1941)
- Seydlitz (27 December 1941 – 16 January 1942)
- Endrass (12 – 17 June 1942)
- Panther (10 – 20 October 1942)
- Veilchen (20 October – 7 November 1942)
- Delphin (26 December 1942 – 19 January 1943)
- Landsknecht (19 – 28 January 1943)
- Without name (27 – 30 March 1943)
- Adler (7 – 13 April 1943)
- Meise (13 – 25 April 1943)
- Rügen (15 – 26 January 1944)
- Hinein (26 – 28 January 1944)

== Summary of raiding history ==
Date	Ship Name	Nationality	Tonnage (GRT)	Fate
26 August 1941	Marija Uljanova	Soviet Navy	3,870	Total loss
29 March 1942	Hertford	United Kingdom	10,923	Sunk
6 April 1942	Koll	Norway	10,044	Sunk
14 April 1942	Margaret	United States	3,352	Sunk
7 July 1942	Umtata	United Kingdom	8,141	Sunk
8 July 1942	J. A. Moffett, Jr.	United States	9,788	Total loss
9 July 1942	Nicholas Cuneo	Honduras	1,051	Sunk
15 July 1942	Pennsylvania Sun	United States	11,394	damaged

== Bibliography ==
- Busch, Rainer; Röll, Hans-Joachim (1999). German U-boat commanders of World War II : a biographical dictionary. Translated by Brooks, Geoffrey. London, Annapolis, Md: Greenhill Books, Naval Institute Press. ISBN 1-55750-186-6.
- Busch, Rainer; Röll, Hans-Joachim (1999). Deutsche U-Boot-Verluste von September 1939 bis Mai 1945 [German U-boat losses from September 1939 to May 1945]. Der U-Boot-Krieg (in German). Vol. IV. Hamburg, Berlin, Bonn: Mittler. ISBN 3-8132-0514-2.
- Gröner, Erich; Jung, Dieter; Maass, Martin (1991). German Warships 1815–1945, U-boats and Mine Warfare Vessels. Vol. 2. Translated by Thomas, Keith; Magowan, Rachel. London: Conway Maritime Press. ISBN 0-85177-593-4.
- Southall, Ivan (1956). They Shall Not Pass Unseen. Sydney: Angus and Robertson.
