= USS Dahlgren (DD-187) =

Clemson-class destroyer

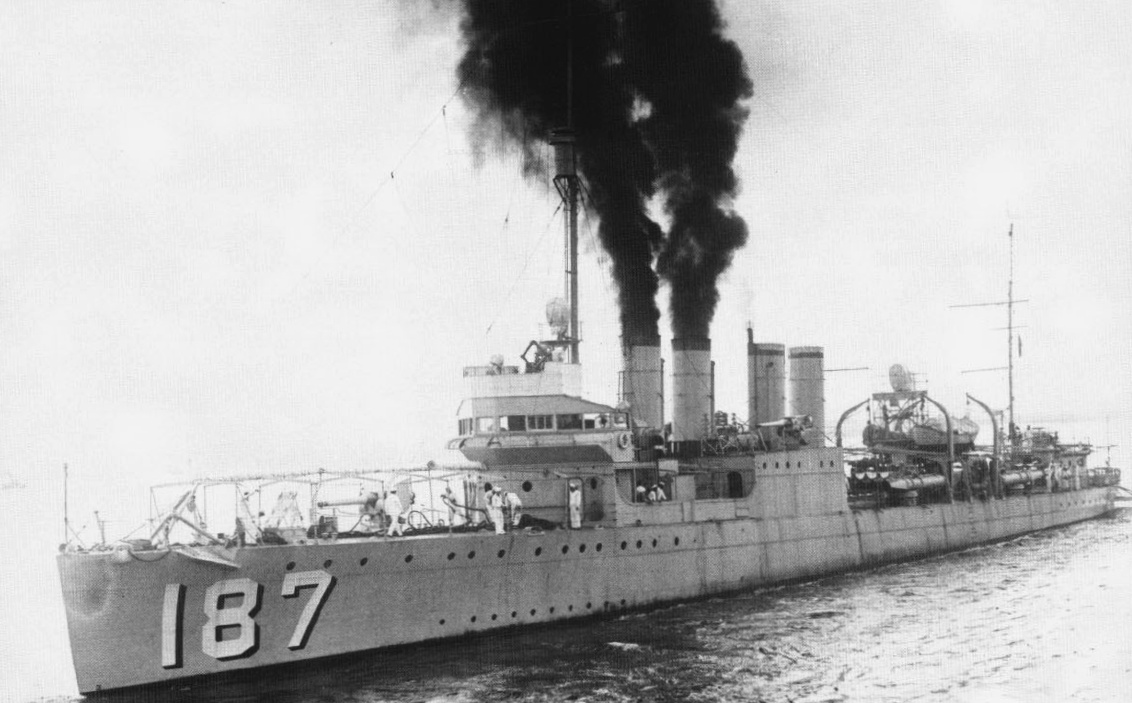

History

United States
- Name: Dahlgren
- Namesake: John A. Dahlgren
- Builder: Newport News Shipbuilding & Dry Dock Company
- Laid down: 8 June 1918
- Launched: 20 November 1918
- Commissioned: 6 January 1920
- Decommissioned: 30 June 1922
- Recommissioned: 25 October 1932
- Reclassified: Miscellaneous auxiliary, AG-91, 1 March 1945
- Decommissioned: 14 December 1945
- Stricken: 8 June 1946
- Fate: Sold for scrap 17 June 1946

General characteristics
- Class & type: Clemson-class destroyer
- Displacement: 1,190 tons
- Length: 314 ft 5 in (95.83 m)
- Beam: 31 ft 9 in (9.68 m)
- Draft: 9 ft 4 in (2.84 m)
- Propulsion: 26,500 shp (19,800 kW); geared turbines, 2 screws
- Speed: 35 kn (65 km/h; 40 mph)
- Range: 4,900 nmi (9,100 km; 5,600 mi) at 15 kn (28 km/h; 17 mph)
- Complement: 111 officers and enlisted
- Armament: 4 × 4 in (100 mm)/50 cal. guns; 3 × 3 in (76 mm)/23 cal. guns; 12 × 21 inch (533 mm) torpedo tubes

USS Dahlgren (DD-187/AG-91) was a Clemson-class destroyer which served in the United States Navy during World War II. Entering service in 1920, the ship had a brief active life before being placed in reserve in 1922. Reactivated in 1932, Dahlgren remained in service mainly as a test ship until 1945. She was sold for scrapping in 1946. She was named for Rear Admiral John A. Dahlgren (1809–1870), and was the second ship of three which served in the US Navy to receive the name.

== Construction and commissioning ==
Dahlgren was launched 20 November 1918 by Newport News Shipbuilding & Dry Dock Company, Newport News, Virginia; sponsored by Mrs. J. Pierce, daughter of Rear Admiral Dahlgren. The ship commissioned on 6 January 1920.

== Service history ==
Dahlgren joined the Atlantic Fleet for exercises and training along the United States East Coast, in Mexican waters, off Guantanamo Bay, Cuba, and in the Panama Canal Zone. She took part in the Presidential Fleet Review at Norfolk, Virginia in April 1921, and in bombing tests on former Imperial German Navy ships off the Virginia coast that summer. On 30 June 1922, she was placed out of commission at Philadelphia.

Recommissioned 25 October 1932, Dahlgren stood out of Norfolk 7 November for San Diego, arriving 30 November. Destroyer operations engaged her along the United States West Coast until April 1934 when fleet exercises brought her to the Atlantic. In January 1935 she returned to San Diego. After a period of similar operations on the U.S. West Coast, she sailed again for the U.S. East Coast on 1 July 1937, and having rescued the crew of a United States Coast Guard seaplane in passage, arrived at New York 21 July 1937. She served in engineering experiments until 14 June 1940.

=== World War II ===
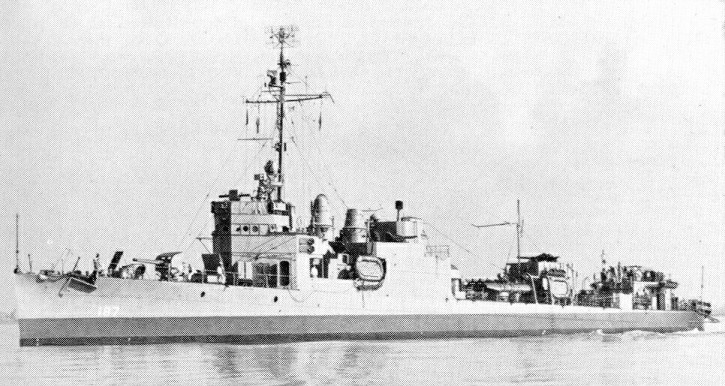
Dahlgren during World War II.

Dahlgren sailed out of Norfolk and Newport, Rhode Island on patrols and escorted submarines in their training, and from January to 1 April 1941 she served in the Patuxent River, Maryland, in experiments in ordnance and submarine detection. Through the summer of 1941, she tested a variable-pitch propeller, and subsequently escorted a new cruiser during her trials. On 4 January 1942, Dahlgren arrived at Key West, Florida, to escort the battleship Washington in operations in the Gulf of Mexico. She returned to New York 8 February for a brief period of coastal patrol, and on 24 March sailed to Key West to serve the Fleet Sonar School and carry out patrols. During these operations, she rescued 57 survivors of the steamer Pennsylvania Sun on 15 July 1942, and nine survivors of the U.S. Navy airship K-74 — which a German submarine had shot down — on 19 July 1943.

On 11 January 1945, Dahlgren arrived at Charleston, South Carolina to operate with submarines in training until 1 March, when she was reclassified AG-91. She served the Mine Warfare Test Station at Solomons Island, Maryland, until 16 November 1945 when she moored at Philadelphia Navy Yard. There she was decommissioned 14 December 1945, and sold 17 June 1946.
