= List of shipwrecks in April 1942 =

The list of shipwrecks in April 1942 includes all ships sunk, foundered, grounded, or otherwise lost during April 1942.

== 1 April ==
List of shipwrecks: 1 April 1942
Ship	State	Description
Buccaneer	Norway	World War II: The cargo ship was sunk in the Skaggerak by V-1609 (Kriegsmarine) whilst attempting to escape from Sweden with the loss of one of her 44 crew. Survivors were taken as prisoners of war.
Charente	Norway	World War II: The cargo ship was intercepted by V 908, V 1604, V 1609, V 1612 and V 1613 (Kriegsmarine) whilst attempting to escape from Sweden. She was scuttled 6 to 7 nautical miles (11 to 13 km) off Käringön, Sweden. Her 31 crew were taken as prisoners of war.
Eastmoor	United Kingdom	World War II: The cargo ship was torpedoed and sunk in the Atlantic Ocean (37°33′N 68°18′W) by U-71 (Kriegsmarine) with the loss of sixteen of her 52 crew. Survivors were rescued by Calgary (United Kingdom).
Escalante R.	United States	World War II: The ship was scuttled in the Philippines, probably at the Mariveles Naval Section Base, Luzon, by the United States Army or by her crew.
Giovanni delle Bande Nere	Regia Marina	World War II: The Giussano-class cruiser was torpedoed and sunk in the Mediterranean Sea 11 nautical miles (20 km) off Stromboli by HMS Urge (Royal Navy) with the loss of 381 of her 772 crew.
Gudvang	Norway	World War II: The cargo ship was intercepted by V 908, V 1604, V 1609, V 1612 and V 1613 (Kriegsmarine) and scuttled by her crew whilst attempting to escape from Sweden.
Kanlaon II	Philippines	World War II: The ship was scuttled at the Mariveles Naval Section Base by the United States Army or by her crew.
Loch Don	United Kingdom	World War II: The cargo ship was torpedoed and sunk in the Atlantic Ocean 500 nautical miles (930 km) north north east of Bermuda (37°05′N 61°40′W) by U-202 (Kriegsmarine) with the loss of three of her 47 crew. Survivors were rescued by Helen Forsey (United Kingdom).
Michael	Germany	World War II: The cargo ship was torpedoed and sunk off Vardø, Norway by Shch-404 (Soviet Navy) with the loss of one of her fifteen crew.
HMS P36	Royal Navy	World War II: The U-class submarine was bombed and sunk at Malta by Regia Aeronautica aircraft. She was raised 7 August 1958 and scrapped.
HMS Pandora	Royal Navy	World War II: The Parthian-class submarine was bombed and sunk at Malta by Regia Aeronautica aircraft with the loss of 27 of her crew. She was raised in September 1943, but was not repaired. She was scrapped post-war.
Rigmor	Norway	World War II: The cargo ship was bombed and sunk in the North Sea (57°27′N 3°21′E) by Luftwaffe aircraft whilst attempting to escape from Sweden.
Rio Blanco	United Kingdom	World War II: The cargo ship was torpedoed and sunk in the Atlantic Ocean 40 nautical miles (74 km) east of Cape Hatteras, North Carolina, United States (35°16′N 74°18′W) by U-160 (Kriegsmarine) with the loss of nineteen of her 40 crew. Survivors were rescued by HMT Hertfordshire (Royal Navy) and HMCS Niagara (Royal Canadian Navy).
Robert W. Pomeroy	Canada	World War II: The cargo ship struck a mine and sank in the North Sea off Cromer, Norfolk, United Kingdom. A gunner was killed. There were 22 survivors.
Shunsei Maru	Imperial Japanese Army	World War II: The Shunsei Maru-class auxiliary transport ship was torpedoed and sunk in the Strait of Malacca off Pulau Perak, Malaya (5°42′N 98°57′E) by HMS Truant (Royal Navy). Two of her crew were killed.
Skytteren	Norway	World War II: The whaling factory ship was scuttled off Måseskär, Sweden to avoid capture.
HMT Solomon	Royal Navy	World War II: The naval trawler struck a mine and sank in the North Sea off Cromer. Her crew were rescued.
Storsten	Norway	World War II: The tanker was sunk in the Skaggerak by German aircraft with the loss of seventeen of the 49 people on board.
Tiger	United States	World War II: The tanker was torpedoed and damaged in the Atlantic Ocean off Cape Henry, Virginia (36°50′N 75°49′W) by U-754 (Kriegsmarine) with the loss of one of her 42 crew. Survivors abandoned ship and were rescued by USS YP-52 (United States Navy). Tiger was taken in tow by USCGC Jackson ( United States Coast Guard) and Relief (United States) but foundered the next day in Chesapeake Bay and was declared a total loss. The wreck was scrapped in 1954.
UJ 1203 Heinrich Günther	Kriegsmarine	World War II: The naval trawler struck a mine and sank north of Wangerooge (53°53′N 07°53′W). There were no casualties.
Willesden	United Kingdom	World War II: The cargo ship was sunk in the South Atlantic (16°00′S 16°00′W) by Thor (Kriegsmarine) with the loss of five of her 47 crew. Survivors were taken as prisoners of war.
Yae Maru	Japan	World War II: The cargo ship was torpedoed and sunk in the Strait of Malacca off Pulau Perak, Malaya (5°42′N 98°57′E) by HMS Truant (Royal Navy). Two gunners and four of her crew were killed.

== 2 April ==
List of shipwrecks: 2 April 1942
Ship	State	Description
Clan Ross	United Kingdom	World War II: The cargo ship was torpedoed and sunk in the Arabian Sea 300 nautical miles (560 km) south west of Bombay, India (15°58′N 68°24′E) by I-6 (Imperial Japanese Navy). Twelve of her crew were 4killed. Survivors were rescued by Christensen (Norway) and an Indian vessel.
V 1515 Rothienbaum	Kriegsmarine	World War II: The Vorpostenboot was sunk at Le Havre, Seine-Inférieure, France in an Allied air raid. She was later raised, repaired and returned to service as M 3857 Rothienbaum.
Valerian Kuibishev	Soviet Union	World War II: The tanker was torpedoed and sunk in the Black Sea (44°57′N 36°58′E) by Luftwaffe aircraft with the loss of 24 of her 56 crew.

== 3 April ==
List of shipwrecks: 3 April 1942
Ship	State	Description
Antonio Landi	Italy	World War II: The coaster was sunk off Punta Platamoni, near Kotor (42°18′N 18°42′E) by a mine. One crew member was killed.
Aust	Norway	World War II: The cargo ship was sunk in the South Atlantic by Thor (Kriegsmarine).
David H. Atwater	United States	World War II: The coaster was shelled and sunk in the Atlantic Ocean off the southern end of Assateague Island (37°57′N 75°10′W) by U-552 (Kriegsmarine) with the loss of 24 of her 27 crew.
Glenshiel	United Kingdom	World War II: The cargo ship was torpedoed and sunk in the Indian Ocean (0°48′S 78°33′E) by I-7 (Imperial Japanese Navy).
New Westminster City	United Kingdom	World War II: The cargo ship was bombed at Murmansk, Soviet Union by Luftwaffe aircraft and was beached. She was declared a constructive total loss. New Westminster City was refloated in June 1945. She was subsequently repaired and returned to service.
Otho	United States	World War II: The cargo ship was torpedoed and sunk in the Atlantic Ocean 200 nautical miles (370 km) east of Cape Henry, Virginia (36°25′N 72°22′W) by U-754 (Kriegsmarine) with the loss of 32 of her 53 crew. Survivors were rescued by Gallia (Norway) and USS Zircon (United States Navy).
Shaumyan	Soviet Navy	The Fidonisy-class destroyer ran aground in the Black Sea off Gelendzhik. She was on a voyage from Novorossiysk to Poti. She was torpedoed by a Luftwaffe aircraft on 26 April and then destroyed by a storm.
Tobruk	Poland	World War II: The cargo ship was bombed and severely damaged at Murmansk by Luftwaffe aircraft. Repairs took until September to complete.
West Irmo	United States	World War II: The cargo ship was torpedoed and damaged in the Atlantic Ocean 300 nautical miles (560 km) west of Takoradi, Gold Coast (2°10′N 5°35′W) by U-505 (Kriegsmarine) with the loss of ten of the 109 people aboard. Survivors abandoned ship and were rescued by HMS Copinsay (Royal Navy), which took West Irmo in tow but she later sank at 2°17′N 5°25′W.

== 4 April ==
List of shipwrecks: 4 April 1942
Ship	State	Description
Alphacca	Netherlands	World War II: The cargo ship was torpedoed and sunk in the Atlantic Ocean (1°50′N 7°40′W) by U-505 (Kriegsmarine) with the loss of fifteen of her 67 crew.
Comol Rico	United States	World War II: The tanker was torpedoed and sunk in the Atlantic Ocean 225 nautical miles (417 km) north of San Juan, Puerto Rico (20°46′N 66°46′W) by U-154 (Kriegsmarine) with the loss of three of her 42 crew. Survivors were rescued by USS Sturtevant (United States Navy).
Dagfred	Norway	World War II: The cargo ship was shelled and sunk in the Indian Ocean (16°15′N 82°09′E) by two Imperial Japanese Navy cruisers. Her 40 crew were allowed to take to the lifeboats before Dagfred was sunk. (Look 06/04/1942)
Glafkos	Hellenic Navy	World War II: The Proteus-class submarine (730 GRT) was bombed and sunk by Luftwaffe bombers in the Harbour of La Valetta Malta. There were no casualties aboard.
RFA Plumleaf	Royal Fleet Auxiliary	World War II: The tanker was bombed and sunk at Malta by aircraft of II Fliegerkorps. She was raised on 28 August 1947, and subsequently scrapped in Sicily, Italy.
RT-103	Soviet Navy	World War II: The naval trawler was bombed and sunk at Zyp Navolok by Luftwaffe aircraft.
Turbo	United Kingdom	World War II: The tanker, which had been bombed and damaged on 20 August 1941, was under tow of Gladys Moller (United Kingdom) in the Red Sea when she broke in two and sank at 25°16′N 35°25′E.

== 5 April ==
List of shipwrecks: 5 April 1942
Ship	State	Description
HMS Abingdon	Royal Navy	World War II: The Hunt-class minesweeper was bombed by Italian aircraft at Malta. She was beached and abandoned after being declared a total loss. Scrapped in situ in the 1950s.
Byron D. Benson	United States	World War II: The tanker was torpedoed and damaged in the Atlantic Ocean 7.5 nautical miles (13.9 km) off the Currituck Inlet, North Carolina (36°08′N 75°32′W) by U-552 (Kriegsmarine) with the loss of ten of her 37 crew. Survivors were rescued by USCGC Dione ( United States Coast Guard) and USS Hamilton (United States Navy). Byron D. Benson sank on 8 April.
Catahoula	United States	World War II: The Design 1022 cargo ship, converted to a tanker, was torpedoed and sunk in the Atlantic Ocean (19°16′N 68°12′W) by U-154 (Kriegsmarine) with the loss of seven of her 45 crew. Survivors were rescued by USS Sturtevant (United States Navy).
HMS Cornwall	Royal Navy	HMS Cornwall World War II: Easter Sunday Raid: The County-class cruiser was bombed and sunk in the Indian Ocean 200 nautical miles (370 km) south west of Ceylon by Japanese aircraft with the loss of 198 of her 700 crew.
Dardanus	United Kingdom	World War II: The cargo ship was bombed and damaged in the Bay of Bengal (16°38′N 82°30′E) by Nakajima B5N aircraft based on Ryūjō (Imperial Japanese Navy). Dardanus was taken under tow by Gandara (United Kingdom). She was shelled the next day by Mikuma, Mogami and Amagiri (all Imperial Japanese Navy), then torpedoed and sunk by Amagiri (16°00′N 82°20′E). Her 78 crew survived.
HMS Dorsetshire	Royal Navy	World War II: Easter Sunday Raid: The County-class cruiser (10,087/13,775 t, 1930) was bombed and sunk in the Indian Ocean 200 nautical miles (370 km) south west of Ceylon by Japanese aircraft with the loss of 234 of her 653 crew.
Empire Beacon	United Kingdom	World War II: The coaster struck a mine and sank in the Bristol Channel off St. Anns Head, Pembrokeshire. Her crew were rescued by Innistrahull (United Kingdom).
Feddy	United Kingdom	The cargo ship was lost off North Ronaldsay, Orkney Islands in a collision with the naval trawler HMT Visenda (Royal Navy). HMT Visenda rescued her crew.
HMS Gallant	Royal Navy	World War II: The G-class destroyer was bombed and damaged beyond economical repair while being repaired after having previously lost her bow to a mine and being beached at Malta on 10 January 1941. The wreck was refloated and sunk as a blockship in September 1943.
Harpasa	United Kingdom	World War II: The cargo ship was bombed and sunk in the Bay of Bengal (19°19′N 85°46′E) by Nakajima B5N "Kate" aircraft from Ryūjō (Imperial Japanese Navy. Six of her 39 crew were killed. Survivors were rescued by Taksang (United Kingdom).
HMS Hector	Royal Navy	World War II: Easter Sunday Raid: The armed merchant cruiser was bombed and sunk at Colombo, Ceylon by Japanese carrier-based aircraft. She was refloated in 1946 and beached 5 nautical miles (9.3 km) north of Colombo. She was broken up in situ.
Ninetto G.	Italy	World War II: The cargo ship was torpedoed and sunk east of Syracuse, Italy (37°05′N 15°41′E) by HMS Una (Royal Navy) with the loss of two of her 30 crew.
RT-61	Soviet Navy	World War II: The naval trawler was bombed and sunk at Murmansk by Luftwaffe aircraft.
Soli	Norway	World War II: The tanker was bombed and damaged at Columbo, Ceylon by Imperial Japanese Navy aircraft. There were no casualties, but she was declared a total loss and was beached. She was refloated on 4 January 1952 and subsequently scrapped at Karachi, Pakistan.
HMS Tenedos	Royal Navy	World War II: The S-class destroyerwas bombed and sunk at Columbo by Japanese aircraft with the loss of 33 crew.
USS YT-247	United States Navy	The harbor tug was sunk in Mariveles Naval Section Base, Bataan, Philippines.

== 6 April ==
List of shipwrecks: 6 April 1942
Ship	State	Description
Autolycus	United Kingdom	World War II: Operation C: The cargo ship was shelled and sunk in the Bay of Bengal 19°53′N 86°30′E) by Kumano, Suzuya and Shirakumo (all Imperial Japanese Navy). Eighteen of her 100 crew were killed.
Banjoewangi	Netherlands	World War II: Operation C: The cargo ship was shelled and sunk in the Bay of Bengal (17°35′N 84°45′E) by Yura and Yūgiri (both Imperial Japanese Navy). Three of her crew were killed.
Batavia	Netherlands	World War II: Operation C: The cargo ship was shelled and sunk in the Bay of Bengal 14 miles (23 km) east of Calingapatam, India (18°12′N 84°21′E) by Yura and Yūgiri (both Imperial Japanese Navy). Four of her crew were killed.
Bienville	United States	World War II: Operation C: The cargo ship was bombed and damaged in the Bay of Bengal by aircraft from Ryūjō, then shelled and sunk at 17°50′N 84°50′E by Chōkai (both Imperial Japanese Navy). Twenty-four of her 41 crew were killed.
Dagfred	Norway	World War II: Operation C: The cargo ship was shelled and sunk in the Indian Ocean 15 miles (24 km) off the Sacramento Lighthouse, 60 miles (97 km) east of Masuliptam, India (16°15′N 82°09′E), by Mikuma, Mogami and Amagiri (all Imperial Japanese Navy). Her 40 crew survived. Dagfred was on a voyage from the Sandheads to Madras, India.
Elmdale	United Kingdom	The cargo ship was shelled and damaged in the Indian Ocean (6°52′N 78°50′E) by I-3 (Imperial Japanese Navy. Elmdale was on a voyage from Karachi, India to Durban, Union of South Africa. She put in to Colombo, Ceylon where temporary repairs were made. She was subsequently repaired in the United States and returned to service.
Elsa	Norway	World War II: Operation C: The tanker was shelled and sunk in the Bay of Bengal 35 nautical miles (65 km; 40 mi) east of Cuttack, India by Kumano, Suzuya, and Shirakumo (all Imperial Japanese Navy) with the loss of one of her 30 crew.
Exmoor	United States	World War II: Operation C: The cargo ship was shelled and sunk in the Bay of Bengal (19°53′N 86°30′E) by Kumano, Suzuya and Shirakumo (all Imperial Japanese Navy). Her 37 crew survived.
Gandara	United Kingdom	World War II: Operation C: The cargo ship was shelled in the Bay of Bengal by Mikuma, Mogami and Amagiri and then torpedoed and sunk by Amagiri (all Imperial Japanese Navy) while towing Dardanus (United Kingdom) (16°00′N 82°20′E). Thirteen of her 77 crew were killed.
Ganges	United Kingdom	World War II: Operation C: The cargo ship was bombed and damaged in the Bay of Bengal 25 miles (40 km) south of Vizagapatam, India by floatplanes from Chōkai (Imperial Japanese Navy). She was shelled and sunk by Chōkai, Ryūjō, another cruiser, and two destroyers (all Imperial Japanese Navy) (17°48′N 84°09′E) with the loss of eleven of her crew.
HMS Havock	Royal Navy	The H-class destroyer ran aground and was wrecked off Kelibia, Tunisia with the loss of a crew member. One hundred and fifty of her crew and 100 military passengers were interned by the Vichy French.
Hermod	Norway	World War II: Operation C: The cargo ship was shelled and sunk in the Indian Ocean 10 miles (16 km) off the coast of Godavari, India by Mikuma, Mogami and Amagiri (all Imperial Japanese Navy). Her 36 officers and crew escaped in three lifeboats and reached shore six hours later, landing at what is now Antervedi Pallipalem.
Indora	United Kingdom	World War II: Operation C: The cargo ship was shelled and sunk in the Bay of Bengal (19°53′N 86°30′E) by Kumano, Suzuya and Shirakumo (all Imperial Japanese Navy). Two of the 83 people on board were killed.
HMIS Indus	Royal Indian Navy	World War II: The Grimsby-class sloop was sunk in a Japanese air raid on Akyab, Burma. Her crew survived and were rescued by HMIS St. Anthony (Royal Indian Navy).
Koll	Norway	World War II: The tanker was torpedoed and sunk in the Atlantic Ocean east of Cape Hatteras, North Carolina, United States (34°39′N 68°25′W) by U-571 (Kriegsmarine) with the loss of three of her 34 crew. Survivors were rescued by Cunene, Lobito (both Portugal) and Saint Cergue (Switzerland).
Kollskegg	Norway	World War II: The tanker was torpedoed and sunk in the Atlantic Ocean (approximately 35°30′N 73°00′W) by U-754 (Kriegsmarine) with the loss of four of her 42 crew. Survivors were rescued by Bushranger (Panama) and HMCS Niagara (Royal Canadian Navy).
Maksim Gorki	Soviet Navy	World War II: The cruiser was bombed and severely damaged at Leningrad by Heinkel He 111 aircraft of Kampfgeschwader 4, Luftwaffe.
Malda	United Kingdom	World War II: Operation C: The cargo ship was bombed by Japanese aircraft, the shelled and sunk in the Bay of Bengal 19°53′N 86°30′E) by Kumano, Suzuya and Shirakumo (all Imperial Japanese Navy). Twenty-five of the 179 people on board were killed.
Oktyabrskaya Revolutsiya	Soviet Navy	World War II: The Gangut-class battleship was bombed and severely damaged at Leningrad by Heinkel He 111 aircraft of Kampfgeschwader 4, Luftwaffe. Repairs took until September to complete.
Selma City	United States	World War II: Operation C: The cargo ship was bombed and damaged in the Bay of Bengal 25 miles (40 km) south of Vizagapatam 17°40′N 83°20′E) by a floatplane from Chōkai (Imperial Japanese Navy). After the ship was abandoned she was bombed by two more floatplanes. The vessel sank the next day.
Shinkuang	Canada	World War II: Operation C: The cargo ship was shelled and sunk in the Bay of Bengal 19°53′N 86°30′E) by Kumano, Suzuya and Shirakumo (all Imperial Japanese Navy). Three crew were killed.
Silksworth	United Kingdom	World War II: Operation C: The cargo ship was shelled and sunk in the Bay of Bengal (19°53′N 86°30′E) by Kumano, Suzuya and Shirakumo (all Imperial Japanese Navy). Her 57 crew survived.
Sinkiang	United Kingdom	World War II: Operation C: The cargo ship was bombed and sunk in the Bay of Bengal by aircraft from Ryūjō (Imperial Japanese Navy). Seven of her crew were killed.
HMSAS Sydostlandet	(United Kingdom) South African Navy	The naval trawler was wrecked off the Umgeni River Estuary.
Taksang	United Kingdom	World War II: Operation C: The cargo ship was shelled and sunk in the Bay of Bengal 14 miles (23 km) east of Calingapatam by Yura and Yūgiri (both Imperial Japanese Navy). Fifteen of her 122 crew were killed.
Van Der Capellen	Netherlands	World War II: Operation C: The cargo ship was bombed and damaged in the Bay of Bengal by aircraft from Ryūjō (Imperial Japanese Navy). She sank on 8 April at 18°20′N 84°18′E.
Washingtonian	United States	World War II: The cargo ship was torpedoed and sunk in the Indian Ocean at the western entrance to Eight Degree Channel (7°25′N 73°05′E) by I-4 (Imperial Japanese Navy). All aboard (39 crew and 2 passengers) survived and sailed their lifeboats to the Maldive Islands.
HMS West Cocker	Royal Navy	World War II: The West-class tugboat was bombed and sunk at Malta.

== 7 April ==
List of shipwrecks: 7 April 1942
Ship	State	Description
Bahadur	United Kingdom	World War II: The cargo ship was shelled, torpedoed and sunk in the Arabian Sea 170 nautical miles (310 km) north west of Bombay, India (19°44′N 68°28′E) by I-6 (Imperial Japanese Navy). Her 86 crew were rescued by Volunteer (United States).
British Splendour	United Kingdom	World War II: The tanker was torpedoed and sunk in the Atlantic Ocean off Cape Hatteras, North Carolina, United States (35°07′N 75°19′W) by U-552 (Kriegsmarine) with the loss of twelve of her 53 crew. Survivors were rescued by HMT St. Zeno (Royal Navy).
HMS Emily	Royal Navy	World War II: The tug was bombed and sunk at Malta.
HMS Hellespont	Royal Navy	World War II: The Robust-class tug was bombed and sunk at Malta.
Lancing	Norway	World War II: The factory ship was torpedoed and sunk in the Atlantic Ocean off Cape Hatteras (35°08′N 75°22′W) by U-552 (Kriegsmarine) with the loss of one of her 50 crew. The survivors were rescued by Pan-Rhode Island (United States). The shipwreck was listed on the National Register of Historic Places in 2013.
Murrayfield	United Kingdom	The cargo ship ran aground off Mousa, Shetland Islands. She floated off on 8 April and sank.
Rosa M.	Italy	World War II: The coaster was torpedoed and sunk in the Mediterranean Sea south of Cattaro by HMS Turbulent (Royal Navy). Her ten crew survived.
HMHS Somersetshire	Royal Navy	World War II: The hospital ship was torpedoed and damaged in the Mediterranean Sea (32°13′N 26°34′E) by U-453 (Kriegsmarine) with the loss of seven of the 187 people aboard. Survivors abandoned ship and were rescued by a Greek Navy destroyer. The crew later reboarded the ship and she was escorted into Alexandria, Egypt by tugs. HMHS Somersetshire was later repaired and returned to service.
HMIS St. Anthony	Royal Indian Navy	The auxiliary patrol boat ran aground on rocks at the entrance to the harbor at Akyab, Burma. She was refloated and departed for Calcutta on 18 April.

== 8 April ==
List of shipwrecks: 8 April 1942
Ship	State	Description
Ara	Sweden	World War II: The cargo ship struck a mine and sank in the North Sea off Terschelling, Friesland, Netherlands.
Carolina Thornden	United Kingdom	World War II: The Admiralty-requisitioned cargo ship, a burned out hulk, was scuttled in Water Sound, Scapa Flow as a blockship. She was sold for scrap in 1948.
USS Dewey	United States Navy	World War II: The drydock was scuttled off Mariveles Harbor, Bataan, Philippines to prevent capture. She was later raised by the Japanese.
Esso Baton Rouge	United States	World War II: The tanker was torpedoed and sunk in the Atlantic Ocean 15 nautical miles (28 km) north east of St. Simons Island, Georgia (31°02′N 80°53′W) by U-123 (Kriegsmarine) with the loss of two of her 38 crew. She was later refloated, repaired and returned to service in November 1942.
Eugene V. R. Thayer	United States	World War II: The tanker was shelled and damaged in the South Atlantic off the coast of Brazil (2°35′S 39°58′W) by Pietro Calvi (Regia Marina). Eugene V. R. Thayer came ashore in the Gulf of Patos, but floated off and sank (2°36′S 39°43′W).
Fultala	United Kingdom	World War II: The cargo ship was torpedoed and sunk in the Indian Ocean 250 miles (400 km) west of Colombo, Ceylon (06°52′N 76°54′E) by I-3 (Imperial Japanese Navy). Her crew were rescued.
Kurzesee	Germany	World War II: The cargo ship was sunk by a mine off Skjervøya, Norway (70°06′N 21°00′E). There were three killed and nine wounded.
HMS Moor	Royal Navy	World War II: The mooring vessel struck a mine and sank in the Mediterranean Sea off Malta.
Nemanja	Yugoslavia	World War II: The cargo ship was torpedoed and sunk in the Atlantic Ocean (40°30′N 64°50′W) by U-84 (Kriegsmarine) with the loss of thirteen of her 47 crew.
Oklahoma	United States	World War II: The tanker was torpedoed and sunk in the Atlantic Ocean 10 nautical miles (19 km) off St. Simons Island, Georgia by U-123 (Kriegsmarine) with the loss of nineteen of her 37 crew. She was later refloated, repaired and was returned to service in December 1942.
ShCh-421	Soviet Navy	World War II: The Shchuka-class submarine was severely damaged by a mine in the Barents Sea (71°07′N 26°53′E). She was scuttled the next day by K-22 (Soviet Navy), which rescued her 43 crew.
HMT Svana	Royal Navy	World War II: The whaler was bombed and sunk off Alexandria, Egypt by Regia Aeronautica aircraft.
HMT Thorgrim	Royal Navy	World War II: The whale was bombed and sunk off Alexandria by Regia Aeronautica aircraft. She was refloated in August 1950, and reportedly taken over by the Egyptian Government.

== 9 April ==
List of shipwrecks: 9 April 1942
Ship	State	Description
RFA Athelstane	Royal Fleet Auxiliary	World War II: Operation C: The Z-class tanker was bombed and sunk off the coast of Ceylon (7°30′N 8°56′E) by Japanese aircraft. Her crew survived.
Athelviscount	United Kingdom	The tanker was driven ashore at Saint John's, Dominion of Newfoundland. She was later refloated.
Atlas	United States	World War II: The tanker was torpedoed and sunk in the Atlantic Ocean off Cape Lookout, North Carolina (34°27′N 76°16′W) by U-552 (Kriegsmarine) with the loss of two of her 34 crew. Survivors were rescued by a United States Coast Guard cutter.
Benwood	Norway	The wreck of Benwood, 23 February 2010 World War II: The cargo ship collided with the tanker Robert C. Tuttle (United States) in the Atlantic Ocean north east of Molasses Reef, Florida due to both being blacked out because of U-boats. She grounded on the Alligator Reef, but slid off and sank on 14 April in what is now the John Pennekamp Coral Reef State Park (25°03′N 80°20′W). Her crew survived.
British Sergeant	United Kingdom	World War II: Operation C: The tanker was sunk in the Indian Ocean off Batticaloa, Ceylon (8°01′N 81°38′E), by Imperial Japanese Navy aircraft. Her 59 crew survived.
Empire Moonrise	United Kingdom	World War II: The cargo ship was bombed and damaged at Colombo, Ceylon. She was subsequently repaired and returned to service.
Esparta	United States	World War II: The cargo ship was torpedoed and sunk in the Atlantic Ocean north east of Fernandina Beach, Florida (30°46′N 81°11′W) by U-123 (Kriegsmarine) with the loss of one of her 40 crew. Survivors were rescued by USS Tyrer (United States Navy). The wreck was located in 1944.
Fanefjeld	Norway	World War II: Convoy UR 17: The cargo ship was torpedoed and sunk in the Atlantic Ocean south of Iceland by U-252 (Kriegsmarine) with the loss of all 24 people on board.
Gala	Italy	World War II: The cargo ship was torpedoed and sunk in the Mediterranean Sea off Benghazi, Libya by HMS Thrasher (Royal Navy).
Henry Keswick	United States Army	World War II: The United States Army-requisitioned salvage tug caught fire from shelling, and was put ashore in Manila Bay off Corregidor Island, Philippines. Her commanding officer was killed rowing for shore after his crew had been evacuated, The survivors were interned. She was refloated on 6 September 1942, repaired and entered Japanese service as Keishu Maru.
HMS Hermes	Royal Navy	World War II: Operation C: The Hermes-class aircraft carrier was sunk in the Indian Ocean east of Ceylon by Japanese Aichi D3A1 aircraft from Hiryū, Shōkaku, and Zuikaku (all Imperial Japanese Navy) with the loss of 307 of her crew. Survivors were rescued by the hospital ship Vita (United Kingdom).
HMS Hollyhock	Royal Navy	World War II: Operation C: The Flower-class corvette was bombed and sunk in the Indian Ocean east of Ceylon by Japanese aircraft while rescuing survivors of RFA Athelstane (Royal Fleet Auxiliary). She sank in 30 to 45 seconds with the loss of 49 lives. Survivors were rescued by RFA Athelstane's lifeboats.
HMS Lance	Royal Navy	World War II: The L-class destroyer was bombed and sunk at Malta. She was declared a constructive total loss. She was refloated in 1944 and towed to the United Kingdom for scrapping.
Lumen	United Kingdom	The cargo ship collided with Spar (Netherlands) in the River Tyne and was damaged. She was repaired and returned to service as Empire Light.
Malchace	United States	World War II: The cargo ship was torpedoed and sunk in the Atlantic Ocean 25 nautical miles (46 km) off Cape Lookout, North Carolina (34°28′N 75°56′W) by U-160 (Kriegsmarine) with the loss of one of her 29 crew. Survivors were rescued by Faja de Oro ( Brazil).
USS Napa	United States Navy	World War II: The Bagaduce-class fleet tug was scuttled off Mariveles Naval Section Base, Luzon, Philippines (14°25′N 120°30′E).
Norviken	Norway	World War II: The cargo ship was bombed and near missed in the Indian Ocean by aircraft from Akagi (Imperial Japanese Navy) with the loss of four of her 46 crew. She was abandoned and came ashore the next day at Timkovie, Ceylon, later catching fire and breaking in two.
USS PT-34	United States Navy	World War II: The ELCO 77'-class PT boat was strafed, bombed and sunk off Cauit Island, Philippines by Imperial Japanese Navy floatplanes. Of six crewmembers two were killed and three wounded.
Sagaing	United Kingdom	World War II: Operation C: The cargo ship was bombed and damaged in Trincomalee Harbour, Ceylon, by Imperial Japanese Navy aircraft and abandoned with the loss of two of the 138 people on board. Reported shelled and sunk in Malay Cove at an unspecified date or scuttled in Trincomalee Harbor on 24 August 1943 for use as a pier. Sagaing was raised by the Sri Lanka Navy on 22 April 2018, towed out to sea and resunk.
HMAS Vampire	Royal Australian Navy	World War II: Operation C: The V-class destroyer was sunk in the Indian Ocean east of Ceylon by Japanese aircraft with the loss of nine of her crew.
USAT Yu Sang	United States Army	World War II: The cargo ship was bombed and sunk by Japanese aircraft at the Mariveles Naval Section Base.

== 10 April ==
List of shipwrecks: 10 April 1942
Ship	State	Description
Bacalod I	United States Army	World War II: The tug was blown up by the United States Army at Cebu City, Philippines to prevent capture.
Balkis	Norway	World War II: Convoy CL 14: The cargo ship was torpedoed, shelled and sunk in the Atlantic Ocean 60 nautical miles (110 km) north of Fortaleza, Brazil (2°30′S 38°00′W) by Pietro Calvi (Regia Marina) with the loss of seven of her 31 crew. Survivors were rescued by Scania (Sweden).
USS Canopus	United States Navy	World War II: The submarine tender was scuttled in Mariveles Bay, Philippines.
Empire Prairie	United Kingdom	World War II: The cargo ship was torpedoed and sunk in the Atlantic Ocean off Philadelphia, Pennsylvania, United States (37°33′N 60°06′W) by U-654 (Kriegsmarine) with the loss of all 49 crew.
USS Finch	United States Navy	World War II: The Lapwing-class minesweeper was bombed and damaged in Manila Bay off Corregidor Island, Philippines by Japanese aircraft. Her 78 crew abandoned the ship, which sank the next day (14°22′N 120°35′E). She was subsequently salvaged by the Japanese and entered Imperial Japanese Navy service as PB-103
Kirkpool	United Kingdom	World War II: The cargo ship was sunk in the South Atlantic by Thor (Kriegsmarine) with the loss of seventeen of her crew.
HMS LCA 166	Royal Navy	The landing craft assault was lost on this date.
Q-112 Abra, and Q-113 Agusan	Philippine Army; United States Army	World War II: The Thornycroft 55 foot-class motor torpedo boats were scuttled in Manila Bay off Paomborg, 4 miles (6.4 km) off the east coast of Bataan.
Sado Maru	Japan	World War II: The cargo ship was torpedoed and sunk in the Pacific Ocean off Yokohama, Honshū by USS Thresher (United States Navy).
San Delfino	United Kingdom	World War II: The tanker was torpedoed and sunk in the Atlantic Ocean east of Cape Hatteras, North Carolina, United States (35°35′N 75°06′W) by U-203 (Kriegsmarine) with the loss of 28 of her 50 crew. Survivors were rescued by HMT Norwich City (Royal Navy).
Tamaulipas	United States	World War II: The tanker was torpedoed and sunk in the Atlantic Ocean 10 nautical miles (19 km) off Cape Lookout, North Carolina (34°25′N 76°00′W) by U-552 (Kriegsmarine) with the loss of two of her 37 crew. Survivors were rescued by HMT Norwich City (Royal Navy).
USS Uranus	United States Navy	World War II: The Uranus-class stores ship ran aground at Akureyri, Iceland. She was refloated on 13 April with assistance from USS Keywaydin and USS Symbol (both United States Navy) and returned to service.

== 11 April ==
List of shipwrecks: 11 April 1942
Ship	State	Description
Empire Cowper	United Kingdom	World War II: Convoy QP 10: The cargo ship was bombed and sunk in the Barents Sea (71°01′N 36°00′E by a Junkers Ju 88 aircraft of the Luftwaffe with the loss of nine of her crew. She was on a voyage from Murmansk, Soviet Union to Iceland.
Eurosee	Germany	World War II: The tanker struck a mine in the North Sea off Terschelling, Friesland, Netherlands and broke in two.
Grenanger	Norway	World War II: The cargo ship was torpedoed, shelled and sunk in the Atlantic Ocean (22°58′N 57°14′W) by U-130 (Kriegsmarine). Her 36 crew were rescued by Almenara (United Kingdom) and USS Courier (United States Navy).
Gulfamerica	United States	World War II: The tanker was torpedoed, shelled by an anti-aircraft gun and sunk in the Atlantic Ocean 5 nautical miles (9.3 km) off Jacksonville, Florida (30°16′N 81°13′W) by U-123 (Kriegsmarine) with the loss of nineteen of her 48 crew. Survivors were rescued by United States Coast Guard patrol boats. She sank with her bow still above the waves. The bow sank on 16 April. The wreck was still showing 2 feet (0.61 m) above water until demolished to 50 feet (15 m) clearance.
Harry F. Sinclair, Jr.	United States	World War II: The tanker was torpedoed and damaged in the Atlantic Ocean 7 nautical miles (13 km) off Cape Lookout, North Carolina (34°25′N 76°30′W) by U-203 (Kriegsmarine) with the loss of ten of her 36 crew. Survivors abandoned ship and were rescued by HMT Hertfordshire (Royal Navy). The burnt-out ship was later towed to Morehead City, North Carolina. She was subsequently repaired, and returned to service as Annibal in 1943.
Hebe	Netherlands	World War II: The cargo ship was sunk in the Atlantic Ocean off the coast of South Carolina, United States in a collision with HMT St. Cathan (Royal Navy). Her crew were rescued by USS YP-22, USS Azurlite, and USS Beryl (all United States Navy).
Kawsar	Egypt	World War II: The transport ship was bombed and damaged in the Mediterranean Sea (31°34′N 31°14′E) by Luftwaffe aircraft with the loss of two of her crew. She was towed to Port Said but was declared a constructive total loss. She was scrapped in 1946.
HMS Kingston	Royal Navy	World War II: The K-class destroyer, already damaged on 22 March in action against the Italian Fleet, was bombed and damaged beyond repair by Luftwaffe aircraft while at drydock at Malta.
HMT St. Cathan	Royal Navy	World War II: The naval trawler collided with Hebe (Netherlands and sank in the Atlantic Ocean off the coast of South Carolina with the loss of 30 of her 39 crew. Survivors were rescued by USS YP-22, USS Azurlite, and USS Beryl (all United States Navy).
Taijun Maru	Imperial Japanese Navy	World War II: The Taijun Maru-class transport was bombed and damaged beyond repair in Lae Harbor, New Guinea by Douglas A-20 Havoc aircraft with the loss of three of her crew. She was scuttled at 06°49′N 147°02′E.
Trongate	United Kingdom	World War II: Convoy SC 79: The cargo ship caught fire at Halifax, Nova Scotia, Canada. She was scuttled by Allied warships.
Ulysses	United Kingdom	World War II: The passenger ship was torpedoed and sunk in the Atlantic Ocean 45 nautical miles (83 km) south of Cape Hatteras, North Carolina (34°23′N 75°35′W) by U-160 (Kriegsmarine. All 290 people aboard rescued by USS Manley (United States Navy).

== 12 April ==
List of shipwrecks: 12 April 1942
Ship	State	Description
Ben Brush	Panama	World War II: The tanker was shelled and sunk in the South Atlantic off the coast of Brazil (04°32′S 35°03′W) by Pietro Calvi (Regia Marina) with the loss of one of her 35 crew.
Delvalle	United States	World War II: The cargo ship was torpedoed and sunk in the Atlantic Ocean (16°51′N 72°25′W) by U-154 (Kriegsmarine) with the loss of two of the 63 people aboard. Survivors were rescued by HMCS Prince Henry (Royal Canadian Navy) or reached land in their lifeboats.
Empire Lotus	United Kingdom	World War II: Convoy SC 79: The cargo ship foundered in the Atlantic Ocean (44°06′N 60°27′W). Her crew were rescued.
Esso Boston	United States	World War II: The tanker was torpedoed and sunk in the Atlantic Ocean 300 nautical miles (560 km) north east of Saint Martin by U-130 (Kriegsmarine). Her 37 crew were rescued by USS Biddle (United States Navy).
Kommunar	Soviet Union	World War II: The auxiliary sailing vessel was sunk by mines in the Black Sea near Kamysh-Buran. Her master and a crew member were killed.
USS PT-35	United States Navy	World War II: The ELCO 77'-class PT boat was scuttled while hauled out on a marine railway at Cebu Shipyard and Engineering Works (10°18′N 123°54′E) when Cebu, Philippines was invaded by the Japanese.
Scotia	Sweden	World War II: The cargo ship was sunk by magnetic mine in the North Sea off Lowestoft, Suffolk, United Kingdom (52°27′00″N 2°05′20″E) with the loss of one of her 26 crew. Many of the survivors were wounded.
USS YAG-4	United States Navy	World War II: The auxiliary minesweeper/patrol ship was shelled and sunk in South Harbor by the Japanese 500 yards (460 m) off Corregidor, Philippines.

== 13 April ==
List of shipwrecks: 13 April 1942
Ship	State	Description
Atlas	Germany	World War II: The cargo ship was torpedoed and sunk in the Mediterranean Sea off Benghazi, Libya by HMS Thrasher (Royal Navy).
HMT Coral	Royal Navy	World War II: The naval trawler was bombed and sunk at Malta.
El Occidente	Panama	World War II: Convoy QP 10: The cargo ship was torpedoed and sunk in the Barents Sea (73°28′N 28°30′E) by U-435 (Kriegsmarine) with the loss of twenty of her 41 crew. Survivors were rescued by HMS Speedwell (Royal Navy).
Empire Amethyst	United Kingdom	World War II: The tanker was torpedoed and sunk in the Caribbean Sea south of the Dominican Republic (15°03′N 69°27′W) by U-154 (Kriegsmarine) with the loss of all 47 crew.
Empire Progress	United Kingdom	World War II: The cargo ship was torpedoed and sunk in the Atlantic Ocean south of Cape Race, Dominion of Newfoundland (40°29′N 52°35′W) by U-402 (Kriegsmarine) with the loss of twelve of her 50 crew. Survivors were rescued by Olaf Fostenes (Norway).
Harpalion	United Kingdom	World War II: Convoy QP 10: The cargo ship was bombed and damaged in the Barents Sea by Junkers Ju 88 aircraft of III Staffeln, Kampfgeschwader 30, Luftwaffe and was abandoned by her 70 crew. She was later torpedoed and sunk (73°33′N 27°19′E) by U-435 (Kriegsmarine).
Kiev	Soviet Union	World War II: Convoy QP 10: The cargo ship was torpedoed and sunk in the Barents Sea (73°22′N 28°48′E) by U-436 (Kriegsmarine) with the loss of six of her crew. Survivors were rescued by HMT Blackfly (Royal Navy).
Korsholm	Sweden	World War II: The cargo ship was shelled and sunk in the Atlantic Ocean 70 nautical miles (130 km) off Cape Canaveral, Florida, United States (28°21′N 80°22′W), by U-123 (Kriegsmarine) with the loss of nine of her 26 crew.
Leslie	United States	World War II: The cargo ship was torpedoed and sunk in the Atlantic Ocean off Cape Canaveral (28°35′N 80°19′W) by U-123 (Kriegsmarine) with the loss of four of her 32 crew. One survivor was rescued by Esso Bayonne (United States), the rest reached land in their lifeboats. Leslie was raised in August 1954 and scrapped.
HMT Lord Snowden	Royal Navy	The naval trawler was sunk in a collision off Falmouth, Cornwall.
PiLB 210	Kriegsmarine	World War II: The PiLB 40 type landing craft was aboard Atlas (Germany) and sank with her when she was torpedoed and sunk.
Partizan Zheleznyak	Soviet Union	World War II: The auxiliary sailing ship was sunk by mines in the Kerch Gulf with the loss of six of her crew.
Ryujin Maru	Japan	World War II: The cargo ship was torpedoed and sunk in the Pacific Ocean south west of Shikoku (31°51′N 132°50′E) by USS Grayling (United States Navy).

== 14 April ==
List of shipwrecks: 14 April 1942
Ship	State	Description
Anton Chekhov	Soviet Navy	World War II: The transport ship struck a mine and sank in the Black Sea off Kerch. There were 200 killed and 50 wounded.
Empire Thrush	United Kingdom	World War II: The Design 1037 ship was torpedoed and sunk in Chesapeake Bay, United States (35°08′N 75°18′W) by U-203 (Kriegsmarine). Her 55 crew were rescued by USS Asterion (United States Navy).
Korthion	Greece	World War II: The cargo ship was torpedoed and sunk in the Atlantic Ocean south of Barbados (12°50′N 60°30′W) by U-66 (Kriegsmarine) with the loss of fourteen of her 23 crew.
KT-608	Soviet Navy	World War II: The minesweeper struck a mine and sank in the Black Sea off Kerch.
Lancaster Castle	United Kingdom	World War II: The cargo ship was bombed and sunk at Murmansk, Soviet Union by Luftwaffe aircraft with the loss of nine of her 57 crew.
Margaret	United States	World War II: The cargo ship was torpedoed and sunk in the Atlantic Ocean about 45 nautical miles (83 km) east of Cape Hatteras, North Carolina (35°15′N 74°38′W), by U-571 (Kriegsmarine) with the loss of all 29 crew.
SKA-042	Soviet Navy	World War II: The submarine chaser struck a mine and sank in the Black Sea off Kerch (45°16′N 36°29′E). Eight men were killed.
U-85	Kriegsmarine	World War II: Operation Drumbeat: The Type VIIB submarine was shelled, depth charged and sunk in the Atlantic Ocean off the Bodie Island Lighthouse, North Carolina (33°55′N 75°13′W) by USS Roper (United States Navy) with the loss of all 46 crew.
U-252	Kriegsmarine	World War II: The Type VIIC submarine was depth charged and sunk in the Atlantic Ocean south west of Ireland (47°00′N 18°14′W) by HMS Stork and HMS Vetch (both Royal Navy) with the loss of all 44 crew.
HMS Upholder	Royal Navy	World War II: The U-class submarine was depth charged and sunk at 34°47′N 15°55′E by Pegaso (Regia Marina) with the loss of all 31 crew.

== 15 April ==
For the scuttling of the Dutch tanker Ocana on this day, see the entry for 25 March 1942

List of shipwrecks: 15 April 1942
Ship	State	Description
M 3810	Kriegsmarine	World War II: The minesweeper was bombed and sunk at Le Havre, Seine-Inférieure, France by Royal Air Force aircraft.
M 4603	Kriegsmarine	World War II: The minesweeper was bombed and sunk at Le Havre by Royal Air Force aircraft.
PT-41	United States Army	World War II: The Elco 77'-class PT boat, while being transferred by road by the Army for use as a gunboat on Lake Lanao, Philippines, was destroyed by the Army to prevent capture.

== 16 April ==
List of shipwrecks: 16 April 1942
Ship	State	Description
Amsterdam	Netherlands	World War II: The tanker was torpedoed and sunk in the Atlantic Ocean (12°00′N 62°45′W) by U-66 (Kriegsmarine) with the loss of two of her 40 crew. Survivors were rescued by Ivan (Yugoslavia).
Bab el Farag	Egypt	World War II: The sailing ship was shelled and sunk in the Mediterranean Sea off the coast of Palestine by U-81 (Kriegsmarine).
Caspia	United Kingdom	World War II: The tanker was torpedoed and sunk in the Mediterranean Sea 10 nautical miles (19 km) south of Beirut, Lebanon by U-81 (Kriegsmarine) with the loss of 27 of her 38 crew. Survivors were rescued by HMML-1023 and HMML-1032 (both Royal Navy).
Delia	Italy	World War II: The cargo ship was torpedoed and sunk in the Mediterranean Sea off Brindisi by HMS Turbulent (Royal Navy).
Desert Light	Panama	World War II: The cargo ship was torpedoed and sunk in the Atlantic Ocean (35°35′N 72°48′W) by U-572 (Kriegsmarine) with the loss of one of her 31 crew. Survivors were rescued by USS Roper (United States Navy).
Empire Howard	United Kingdom	World War II: Convoy PQ 14: The cargo ship was torpedoed and sunk in the Barents Sea northwest of North Cape, Norway (73°48′N 21°32′E) by U-403 (Kriegsmarine) with the loss of 25 of the 62 people aboard. Survivors were rescued, 9, including her Master, by HMT Lord Middleton and 28 by HMT Northern Wave (both Royal Navy).
Fatouh el Kher	Egypt	World War II: The sailing ship was shelled and sunk off Palestine by U-81 (Kriegsmarine).
Robin Hood	United States	World War II: The cargo ship was torpedoed and sunk in the Atlantic Ocean 200 nautical miles (370 km) south east of Nantucket Island, Massachusetts (38°45′N 66°45′W), by U-575 (Kriegsmarine) with the loss of fourteen of her 38 crew. Survivors were rescued on 23 April by USS Greer (United States Navy).
Svanetia	Soviet Navy	World War II: The transport ship was bombed and sunk in the Black Sea off Sevastopol by Luftwaffe aircraft with the loss of 535 lives.
Vikings	Free French Naval Forces	World War II: The anti-submarine trawler was torpedoed and sunk in the Mediterranean Sea 23 nautical miles (43 km) off Beirut, Lebanon (at 33°40′N 35°10′E), by U-81 (Kriegsmarine) with the loss of 41 of her 57 crew.

== 17 April ==
List of shipwrecks: 17 April 1942
Ship	State	Description
Alcoa Guide	United States	World War II: The cargo ship was shelled and sunk in the Atlantic Ocean 300 nautical miles (560 km) south east of Cape Hatteras, North Carolina (35°34′N 70°08′W) by U-123 (Kriegsmarine) with the loss of six of her 34 crew. Twenty-seven crewmen in two lifeboats were rescued on 19 April by USS Broome (United States Navy). A crewman was rescued from a liferaft on 18 May by Hororata (United Kingdom).
Heinrich von Riedemann	Panama	World War II: The tanker was torpedoed and sunk in the Atlantic Ocean (11°55′N 63°47′W) by U-66 (Kriegsmarine). Her 44 crew were rescued by Karmt (Norway) and Maracaibo (Venezuela).
Kitami Maru	Imperial Japanese Navy	World War II: The Yatsushiro Maru-class naval trawler/auxiliary storeship was torpedoed and sunk 50 nautical miles (93 km; 58 mi) south east of Kavieng, Papua New Guinea (03°00′S 152°00′E) by USS Tambor (United States Navy) with the loss of all 26 hands.
Victoria	Argentina	World War II: The tanker was torpedoed and damaged in the Atlantic Ocean 300 nautical miles (560 km) east of Cape Hatteras (36°41′N 68°48′W) by U-201 (Kriegsmarine) and was abandoned by her 39 crew, who were rescued by USS Nicholson and USS Owl (both United States Navy). Victoria was subsequently boarded by men from USS Owl and towed to New York, United States for repairs. She was requisitioned by the United States on 24 July and returned to service a week later as the Culpeper under the Panamanian flag.

== 18 April ==
List of shipwrecks: 18 April 1942
Ship	State	Description
Bellona	Germany	World War II: The cargo ship was torpedoed and sunk in the Mediterranean Sea off Tobruk, Libya by HMS Thrasher (Royal Navy).
Empire Bede	United Kingdom	World War II: Convoy TAW 13: The cargo ship was torpedoed and damaged in the Atlantic Ocean (19°41′N 76°25′W) by U-553 (Kriegsmarine). Survivors were rescued by HMS Pimpernel (Royal Navy). Empire Bede was on a voyage from Alexandria, Egypt to an American port. She was consequently scuttled by HMS Pimpernel at 19°41′N 76°50′W).
Komaki Maru	Imperial Japanese Navy	World War II: The aircraft transport was bombed and sunk at Rabaul, Papua New Guinea (04°15′S 152°20′E) by Martin B-26 Marauder aircraft of the United States 5th Air Force. The stern of the ship exploded. The rest of the ship was scuttled by shore batteries. She sank in shallow water and submerged to close to the top of the hull. Her hull was filled with dirt and became a pier.
Iwata Maru No. 1	Imperial Japanese Navy	World War II: Doolittle Raid: The guard boat was bombed by Douglas SBD Dauntless aircraft and strafed by Grumman F4F Wildcat aircraft from USS Enterprise (United States Navy). She sank the next day. Her crew were rescued by I-74 (Imperial Japanese Navy).
Nagato Maru	Imperial Japanese Navy	World War II: Doolittle Raid: The guard boatwas bombed by Douglas SBD Dauntless aircraft and strafed by Grumman F4F Wildcat aircraft from USS Enterprise (United States Navy), then shelled and sunk in the Pacific Ocean by USS Nashville (United States Navy).
Nanshin Maru No. 26	Imperial Japanese Navy	World War II: Doolittle Raid: The guard boat was bombed by Douglas SBD Dauntless and strafed by Grumman F4F Wildcat aircraft from USS Enterprise (United States Navy). She was scuttled by Kiso (Imperial Japanese Navy) the next day after Kiso rescued survivors.
Nitto Maru No. 23	Imperial Japanese Navy	World War II: Doolittle Raid: The patrol boat was shelled and sunk in the Pacific Ocean by USS Nashville (United States Navy). Survivors were rescued by USS Nashville.
Seefahrer	Germany	World War II: The cargo ship struck a mine and sank in the North Sea off Borkum. She was later raised and laid up at Askøy, Norway. Seefahrer was scrapped post-war at Stavanger, Norway.

== 19 April ==
List of shipwrecks: 19 April 1942
Ship	State	Description
Assunta de Grigori	Italy	World War II: The cargo ship (5,219 GRT) was torpedoed and sunk in the Mediterranean Sea off Sfax, Tunisia (34°55′N 11°42′E) by HMS Umbra (Royal Navy) with the loss of 26 or 27 lives. There were 35 survivors.
Chokyu Maru	Imperial Japanese Navy	The auxiliary guard boat (116 GRT) was lost on this date.
El Cano1938	Philippines	World War II: The cargo ship was shelled and sunk off Corregidor, possibly by a Japanese submarine.
Exminster	United States	The cargo ship sank in 50 feet (15 m) of water in Cape Cod Bay off the entrance to the Cape Cod Canal, 1 nautical mile (1.9 km) north east of the Scusset Beach Breakwater, after colliding with Algic (United States). Exminster was quickly refloated and towed to New York. She was scrapped in 1946.
Hefz el Rahman	Egypt	World War II: The sailing ship was rammed and sunk in the Mediterranean Sea off the coast of Palestine by U-81 (Kriegsmarine).
MAS 1D	Regia Marina	The Lursen E-boat sank off Mljet Island due to a rupture in the bottom of her hull.
Patella	United Kingdom	World War II: The tanker was shelled and sunk in the South Atlantic by Michel (Kriegsmarine) with the loss of five of her 65 crew. Survivors were taken as prisoners of war.
No. 102	Soviet Navy	The MO-4-class patrol vessel was lost on this date.

== 20 April ==
List of shipwrecks: 20 April 1942
Ship	State	Description
Agra	Sweden	World War II: The cargo ship was torpedoed and sunk in the Atlantic Ocean 280 nautical miles (520 km) north west of Bermuda (34°40′N 69°35′W) by U-654 (Kriegsmarine) with the loss of six of her 39 crew. Survivors were rescued by Tercero (Norway).
Arete	Sweden	World War II: The coaster struck a mine and sank in the Great Belt with the loss of four lives.
HMS Cotswold	Royal Navy	World War II: Convoy FS 80: The Hunt-class destroyer struck a mine and was damaged in the North Sea off Aldeburgh, Suffolk with the loss of five of her crew. She was taken in tow and beached off Shotley, Suffolk. She was refloated on 3 May, repaired and returned to service.
Elcano	United States	World War II: The cargo ship was shelled and sunk off Corregidor, Philippines by a Japanese submarine.
Empire Dryden	United Kingdom	World War II: The cargo ship was torpedoed and sunk in the Atlantic Ocean, 240 nautical miles (440 km) north west of Bermuda (34°21′N 69°00′W) by U-572 (Kriegsmarine) with the loss of 26 of her 47 crew. Survivors were rescued by City of Birmingham (United States).
Harpagon	United Kingdom	World War II: The cargo ship was torpedoed and sunk in the Atlantic Ocean 150 nautical miles (280 km) north north west of Bermuda (34°35′N 65°50′W) by U-109 (Kriegsmarine) with the loss of 41 of her 49 crew. Survivors were rescued by Rio Diamante (Argentina).
Hödur	Germany	World War II: The cargo ship was torpedoed and sunk in the Norwegian Sea off Namsos, Norway (64°38′N 10°49′E) by HMS Trident (Royal Navy).
Ledokol No. 7	Soviet Union	World War II: The icebreaker was sunk by mines in the Black Sea between Novorossiysk and Kerch with the loss of 25 of her 36 crew.
M 4006 Neuwerk	Kriegsmarine	World War II: The Neuwerk-class naval trawler/minesweeper struck a mine and sank in the English Channel off Morlaix, Finistère, France.
Pampas	United Kingdom	The cargo ship was bombed and sunk in the Grand Harbour, Malta.
Plawsworth	United Kingdom	World War II: The cargo ship struck a mine and sank in the North Sea off Aldeburgh, Suffolk.
Steelmaker	United States	World War II: The cargo ship was torpedoed and sunk in the Atlantic Ocean 350 nautical miles (650 km) east of Wilmington, North Carolina (33°48′N 70°36′W) by U-654 (Kriegsmarine) with the loss of one of her 48 crew. Twenty-seven survivors were rescued by Pacific Exporter (United Kingdom) on 29 April and one by USS Rowan (United States Navy) on 18 May.
Turksib	Soviet Union	The cargo ship was wrecked in the Unimak Strait, Alaska Territory.
Vae Victis	Belgium	World War II: The cargo ship struck a mine and sank in the North Sea, 3 nautical miles (5.6 km) off Aldeburgh.
Vineland	Canada	World War II: The Design 1022 ship was torpedoed and sunk in the Atlantic Ocean (23°05′N 72°20′W) by U-154 (Kriegsmarine) with the loss of one of her 35 crew.

== 21 April ==
List of shipwrecks: 21 April 1942
Ship	State	Description
Bris	Norway	World War II: The cargo ship was torpedoed and sunk in the Atlantic Ocean (33°35′N 69°35′W) by German submarine U-201 (Kriegsmarine) with the loss of four of her 25 crew. Survivors were rescued by Chester O. Swain (United States) and USS YT-132 (United States Navy).
Chenango	Panama	World War II: The cargo ship was torpedoed and sunk in the Atlantic Ocean 30 nautical miles (56 km) east of Cape Hatteras, Virginia, United States (35°25′N 74°55′W) by U-84 (Kriegsmarine) with the loss of 31 of her 32 crew. The survivor was rescued by a Consolidated PBY Catalina aircraft of the United States Coast Guard.
13V2 Delpa II	Kriegsmarine	World War II: The patrol craft was shelled and sunk in the Ionian Sea off Cape Drepano Greece by HMS Torbay (Royal Navy).
HMT Jade	Royal Navy	World War II: The naval trawler was bombed and sunk in the Grand Harbor, Malta.
Kalinin	Soviet Navy	World War II: The transport ship was bombed and sunk at Novorossiysk by Luftwaffe aircraft.
Pipestone County	United States	World War II: The Design 1022 ship was torpedoed and sunk in the Atlantic Ocean 475 nautical miles (880 km) east of Cape Henry, Virginia (37°43′N 66°16′W) by U-576 (Kriegsmarine). Her 46 crew were rescued by USCGC Calypso ( United States Coast Guard), the fishing vessel Irene and May (United States) and Tropic Star (Norway).
San Jacinto	United States	World War II: The passenger ship (6,069 GRT) was torpedoed, shelled and sunk in the Atlantic Ocean 375 nautical miles (694 km) south east of Cape Hatteras (31°10′N 70°45′W) by U-201 (Kriegsmarine) with the loss of nine passengers and 5 crew. The 169 survivors (95 passengers and 74 crew) were rescued by USS Rowan (United States Navy) the next day.
West Imboden	United States	World War II: The Design 1013 ship was torpedoed and sunk in the Atlantic Ocean 175 nautical miles (324 km) east of the Nantucket Lightship ( United States Lighthouse Service) (41°14′N 65°55′W) by U-752 (Kriegsmarine). Her 35 crew were rescued by USS Bristol (United States Navy).

== 22 April ==
List of shipwrecks: 22 April 1942
Ship	State	Description
Aziza	Egypt	World War II: The sailing ship (100 GRT) was shelled and sunk in the Mediterranean Sea about 40 miles west of Tripoli, Lebanon by U-81 (Kriegsmarine). There were no casualty.
Blankenese	Germany	World War II: The cargo ship was torpedoed and sunk in the Barents Sea off Kirkenes, Norway (70°32′02″N 30°47′00″E) by M-173 (Soviet Navy) with the loss of one of the 46 people on board.
Derryheen	United Kingdom	World War II: The cargo ship (7,217 GRT) on her maiden voyage, was torpedoed and sunk in the Atlantic Ocean south east of Cape Hatteras, North Carolina, United States (31°20′N 70°35′W) by U-201 (Kriegsmarine). All 51 people aboard were rescued by Lobos (United Kingdom).
El Saadiah	Egypt	World War II: The sailing ship (122 GRT) was shelled and sunk in the Mediterranean Sea about 15 miles west of Ras Nakoura, Lebanon by U-81 (Kriegsmarine).
Unnamed	Nazi Germany	World War II: The harbour tug was sunk by a mine in the harbor of Odesa, Soviet Union.

== 23 April ==
List of shipwrecks: 23 April 1942
Ship	State	Description
Chatwood	United Kingdom	World War II: The cargo ship struck a mine and sank in the North Sea off Cromer, Norfolk. Her 24 crew were rescued.
Connecticut	United States	World War II: The tanker was torpedoed and sunk in the Atlantic Ocean (23°00′S 15°00′W) by LS 4 Esan (Kriegsmarine), operating from Michel (Kriegsmarine) with the loss of 24 of her crew and eleven Naval Armed Guards. Eighteen survivors were rescued by Michel and eventually turned over to the Japanese as prisoners of war.
Jersey	United Kingdom	World War II: The cargo ship struck a mine and sank in the Red Sea off Suez, Egypt. Her 42 crew survived.
Kirkland	United Kingdom	World War II: Convoy TA 36: The cargo ship was torpedoed and sunk in the Mediterranean Sea 35 nautical miles (65 km; 40 mi) north west of Sidi Barrani, Egypt (31°51′N 26°37′E) by U-565 (Kriegsmarine) with the loss of one of her 23 crew. Survivors were rescued by HMT Falk (Royal Navy).
Lammot Du Pont	United States	World War II: The cargo ship was torpedoed and sunk in the Atlantic Ocean 500 nautical miles (930 km; 580 mi) south east of Bermuda (27°10′N 57°10′W) by U-125 (Kriegsmarine) with the loss of seventeen of her 54 crew. Survivors were rescued by Astri (Sweden) and USS Tarbell (United States Navy).
Manju Maru	Imperial Japanese Navy	The auxiliary patrol boat was stranded on a reef. The vessel was unloaded on 28 April. Apparently refloated, or stripped and abandoned, on 29 April, sources not clear.
Stensaas	Norway	World War II: The cargo ship was torpedoed and sunk in the Barents Sea off the Slettnes Lighthouse (71°04′N 28°20′E) by Shch-401 (Soviet Navy). Her crew were rescued by UJ-1101 (Kriegsmarine).

== 24 April ==
List of shipwrecks: 24 April 1942
Ship	State	Description
Empire Drum	United Kingdom	World War II: The cargo ship was torpedoed and sunk in the Atlantic Ocean, 280 nautical miles (520 km) south east of New York, United States (37°00′N 69°15′W) by U-136 (Kriegsmarine). Her 41 crew survived; they were rescued by USS Roper (United States Navy) and Venezia (Sweden).

== 25 April ==
List of shipwrecks: 25 April 1942
Ship	State	Description
HMT Chorley	Royal Navy	The 128.8-foot (39.3 m), 284-ton boom defence vessel/naval trawler foundered from leaks due to poor condition of vessel off Start Point, Devon (50°09′N 03°38′W). Two crew killed, 20 survivors.
Leesee	Germany	World War II: The cargo ship was bombed and sunk by aircraft off the coast of Norway.
Modesta	United Kingdom	World War II: The cargo ship was torpedoed and sunk in the Atlantic Ocean (33°40′N 63°10′W) by U-108 (Kriegsmarine) with the loss of 18 of her 41 crew. Survivors were rescued by Belgian Airman (Belgium).
Toba Maru	Imperial Japanese Army	World War II: The Toyohashi Maru-class auxiliary transport ship was torpedoed and damaged in the South China Sea off the mouth of Lingayen Gulf, Luzon, Philippines (17°01′N 120°15′E) by USS Spearfish (United States Navy). Two of her crew were killed. Toba Maru was beached 10 kilometres (6.2 mi) west of Cape Candon, Luzon, the next day. She was refloated on 27 April and taken to Kirun for repair, but apparently not repaired until 1946 after being confiscated by the Chinese.
Vahur	Soviet Union	World War II: The cargo ship was sunk at Leningrad by Luftwaffe aircraft.

== 26 April ==
List of shipwrecks: 26 April 1942
Ship	State	Description
Alcoa Partner	United States	World War II: The cargo ship was torpedoed and sunk in the Caribbean Sea 80 nautical miles (150 km) north west of Bonaire, Netherlands Antilles (13°32′N 67°57′W) by U-66 (Kriegsmarine) with the loss of ten of her 35 crew.
Norlom	Norway	The Design 1105 ship ran aground on the Valiant Rock, in Long Island Sound and was abandoned by her crew. She was on a voyage from New York, United States to a British port. She was refloated on 11 May and towed back to New York. Subsequently repaired and returned to service.
USS Sturtevant	United States Navy	World War II: The Clemson-class destroyer struck a mine and sank in the Atlantic Ocean off Key West, Florida with the loss of fifteen of her 130 crew.

== 27 April ==
List of shipwrecks: 27 April 1942
Ship	State	Description
Inga	Denmark	The cargo ship was wrecked on the South Horns Reef.
Svir	Soviet Navy	World War II: The training ship was sunk in a Luftwaffe air raid on Leningrad.
HMS Urge	Royal Navy	World War II: The U-class submarine was mined and sunk off Malta with the loss of all 44 people on board. The wreck was discovered in 2019.

== 28 April ==
List of shipwrecks: 28 April 1942
Ship	State	Description
Arundo	Netherlands	World War II: The tanker was torpedoed and sunk in the Atlantic Ocean 15 nautical miles (28 km) south of the Ambrose Lightship ( United States Lighthouse Service) (40°10′N 73°44′W) by U-136 (Kriegsmarine) with the loss of six of her 43 crew. Survivors were rescued by USS Lea (United States Navy).
Tatsufuku Maru	Japan	World War II: The cargo ship was torpedoed and sunk in the South China Sea by USS Seal (United States Navy).
HMS West Dean	Royal Navy	World War II: The West-class tugboat was bombed and sunk at Malta.
USS YP-77	United States Navy	The yard patrol craft was sunk off the Atlantic Coast in a collision.

== 29 April ==
List of shipwrecks: 29 April 1942
Ship	State	Description
Alliance	United Kingdom	World War II: The tug struck a mine and sank in the Mediterranean Sea off Famagusta, Cyprus (35°09′N 33°56′E) with the loss of three of her ten crew.
Curityba	Germany	World War II: The cargo ship was torpedoed and sunk off Vardø, Norway by M-171 (Soviet Navy) with the loss of 22 of the 56 people on board.
F-14-V	Norway	World War II: The fishing trawler was on board Curityba (Germany) and was lost when that ship was sunk.
F 130	Kriegsmarine	World War II: The Type A Marinefahrprahmwas damaged by a Soviet mine in the Black Sea and was beached. She was refloated, repaired and returned to service.
Harry G. Seidel	Panama	World War II: The tanker was torpedoed and sunk in the Caribbean Sea west of Trinidad (11°50′N 62°50′W) by U-66 (Kriegsmarine) with the loss of two of her 50 crew.
Mobiloil	United States	World War II: The tanker was torpedoed and sunk in the Atlantic Ocean 350 nautical miles (650 km) north east of the Turks and Caicos Islands (26°10′N 66°15′W). Her 52 crew were rescued by USS PC-490 (United States Navy).
Sui Sang	United Kingdom	The cargo ship caught fire at Abadan, Iran. She was declared a total loss.
T-494	Soviet Navy	World War II: The auxiliary minesweeper was sunk in the Black Sea by Luftwaffe aircraft with the loss of twenty of her 39 crew.
Terpsithea	United Kingdom	World War II: The schooner struck a mine and sank off Famagusta (35°09′N 33°56′E). Her crew survived.

== 30 April ==
List of shipwrecks: 30 April 1942
Ship	State	Description
Ashkhabad	Soviet Union	Ashkhabad World War II: The cargo ship was torpedoed and damaged in the Atlantic Ocean 18 nautical miles (33 km) south of Cape Lookout, North Carolina, United States (34°19′N 76°31′W) by U-402 (Kriegsmarine). She was abandoned by her 47 crew, who were rescued by HMT Lady Elsa (Royal Navy). Ashkhabad was assessed as salvageable, and Relief (United States) was despatched to her aid, but she was scuttled by USS Semmes (United States Navy) and HMT St Zeno (Royal Navy) as a hazard to navigation.
Athelempress	United Kingdom	World War II: The tanker was torpedoed and sunk in the Atlantic Ocean 180 nautical miles (330 km) east of Barbados (13°21′N 56°15′W) by U-162 (Kriegsmarine) with the loss of three of her 50 crew. Survivors were rescued by Atlantic (Norway).
Bidevind	Norway	World War II: The cargo ship (4,956 GRT) was torpedoed and sunk in the Atlantic Ocean (39°35′N 72°42′W) by the submarine U-752 (Kriegsmarine). Her 36 crew survived. Her wreck lies in 190 feet (58 m) of water at 39°48′57″N 72°46′07″W. Sources putting this loss on 1 May 1942 use Berlin time, she was sunk in the evening of the 30th in local time.
HMS Edinburgh	Royal Navy	World War II: Convoy QP 11: The Town-class cruiser was torpedoed and damaged in the Barents Sea north of Murmansk, Soviet Union (73°09′N 32°45′E) by U-456 (Kriegsmarine). She was taken in tow, but was torpedoed and sunk in the Kola Inlet on 2 May by Z24 (Kriegsmarine) with the loss of 58 of her 750 crew. Survivors were rescued by HMS Gossamer and HMS Harrier (both Royal Navy).
Federal	United States	World War II: The tanker was torpedoed and sunk in the Atlantic Ocean 5 nautical miles (9.3 km) north of Gibara, Cuba (21°13′N 76°05′W) by U-507 (Kriegsmarine) with the loss of five of her 33 crew. Survivors were rescued by a Cuban fishing vessel or reached shore in their lifeboat.
Taborfjell	Norway	World War II: The cargo ship was torpedoed and sunk in the Atlantic Ocean 95 nautical miles (176 km) off Cape Cod, Massachusetts, United States (41°52′N 67°43′W) by U-576 (Kriegsmarine) with the loss of seventeen of her twenty crew. Survivors were rescued by HMS P552 (Royal Navy).

== Unknown date ==
List of shipwrecks: Unknown date 1942
Ship	State	Description
Chr. Knudsen	Norway	World War II: The cargo ship departed from New York, United States for Cape Town, Union of South Africa on 8 April; no further trace. It is probable that she was torpedoed and sunk by U-85 (Kriegsmarine) on 10 April with the loss of all 33 crew.
HMS LCA 211	Royal Navy	The Landing Craft, Assault was lost in April.
HMS LCM 38	Royal Navy	The Landing Craft, Mechanized was lost sometime in April.
MMS 148	United Kingdom	World War II: The incomplete MMS-class minesweeper was scuttled on the stocks at the Rangoon Dockyard, Rangoon, Burma, sometime in March.
MMS 153	United Kingdom	World War II: The incomplete MMS-class minesweeper was scuttled on the stocks at the Irrawaddy Flotilla Co. shipyard, Rangoon, sometime in March.
MMS 156, MMS 161, MMS 162, MMS 163, and MMS 164	United Kingdom	World War II: The incomplete MMS-class minesweepers were scuttled on the stocks at the H. Stone shipyard, Rangoon.
ShCh-401	Soviet Navy	World War II: The Shchuka-class submarine was lost on or after 23 April, last reported off the Tanafjord.
U-702	Kriegsmarine	World War II: The Type VIIC submarine was lost on patrol in the North Sea on or after 3 April with the loss of all 44 crew.
