= Catahoula =

Catahoula may refer to:

== Places ==
- Catahoula, Louisiana, St. Martin Parish, Louisiana, U.S.
- Catahoula Parish, Louisiana, U.S.
- Catahoula Creek, a stream in Mississippi, U.S.
- Catahoula Lake, Louisiana, U.S.

== Other uses ==
- Catahoula Leopard Dog, an American dog breed
- SS Catahoula, a 1920 cargo ship

== See also ==
- Catahoula Formation, a geologic formation in Texas and Louisiana
