= Karl-Ernst Schroeter =

- Born: 3 December 1912; Freystadt, Silesia, Germany
- Died: 23 May 1943 (aged 30) North Atlantic ocean
- Allegiance: Nazi Germany
- Branch: Kriegsmarine
- Service years: 1934–1943
- Rank: Korvettenkapitän
- Commands: U-121; U-752
- Conflicts: World War II: Battle of the Atlantic (1939-1945)

Karl-Ernst Schroeter (3 December 1912 – 23 May 1943) was a Korvettenkapitän with the Kriegsmarine during World War II and commander of U-121 and U-752. Schroeter is credited with sinking eight ships, all in U-752, for 33,492 GRT.

Schroeter commissioned the new Type IIB U-boat U-121 on May 28, 1940 and served as her first commanding officer until March 30, 1941. The U-121 spent her entire career as training vessel and Schroeter saw no combat in her. From the U-121 Schroeter moved on to the new Type VIIC U-752, which was commissioned on May 24, 1941. Schroeter would command the U-752 for the next two years until its sinking and his death on May 23, 1943.

== War record ==
Ships attacked
Date	Ship	Tonnage	Nationality	Convoy	Fate
25 August 1941	T-898 (No 44)	553	Soviet Union		Sunk
15 November 1941	T-889 (No 34)	581	Soviet Union		Sunk
21 April 1942	West Imboden	5,751	United States		Sunk
23 April 1942	Reinholt	4,799	Norway		Damaged
1 May 1942	Bidevind	4,956	Norway		Sunk
23 July 1942	Garmula	5,254	United Kingdom		Sunk
27 July 1942	Leikanger	4,003	Norway	FN-20	Sunk
9 August 1942	Mendanau	6,047	Netherlands		Sunk
13 August 1942	Cripple Creek	6,347	United States		Sunk

== Bibliography ==
- Blair, Clay (1996). Hitler's U-boat War: The Hunters 1939–1942. New York: Random House. ISBN 0-394-58839-8.
- Blair, Clay (2000). Hitler's U-boat War: The Hunted 1942–1945. New York: Modern Library. ISBN 0-679-64033-9.
- Busch, Rainer; Röll, Hans-Joachim (1999b). German U-boat commanders of World War II : a biographical dictionary. Translated by Brooks, Geoffrey. London, Annapolis, Md: Greenhill Books, Naval Institute Press. ISBN 1-55750-186-6.
