= Richardsons Westgarth & Company =

British shipbuilding company

- Company type: Public
- Industry: Marine engineering
- Founded: 1832
- Defunct: 2000
- Fate: Acquired
- Successor: Klöckner
- Headquarters: Hartlepool, UK

Richardsons Westgarth & Company was a leading British shipbuilding and marine engineering business. The Company was based in Hartlepool and was a major employer in the area.

== History ==
The company was established in 1832 by Thomas Richardson as a marine engineering concern based in Hartlepool under the name of T. Richardson & Sons. In 1900 it merged with Sir C. Furness Westgarth and Company of Middlesbrough and William Allan and Company of Sunderland to form Richardsons Westgarth. As part of the merger Furness Withy, a shipping business, took a controlling interest in the company.

From 1840 to 1857, products included steam locomotives. The Company was at the forefront of the development of steam engines and diesel engines for large ships throughout the nineteenth and early twentieth centuries. It built engines for many ships including SS Empire Amethyst. In 1927, the company began manufacturing Brown Boveri designed turbo-alternators under licence. It acquired the firm of George Clark in Sunderland in 1938. In 1962 its marine activities were merged with that of Weir Group and it began focussing on engineering for power stations such as Trawsfynydd and Dungeness B. It ceased operations in Hartlepool in 1982.

The Company then diversified into steel processing and was acquired by Klöckner, one of the world's largest steel stockholders, in 2000.
