= German submarine U-121 (1940) =

German World War II submarine

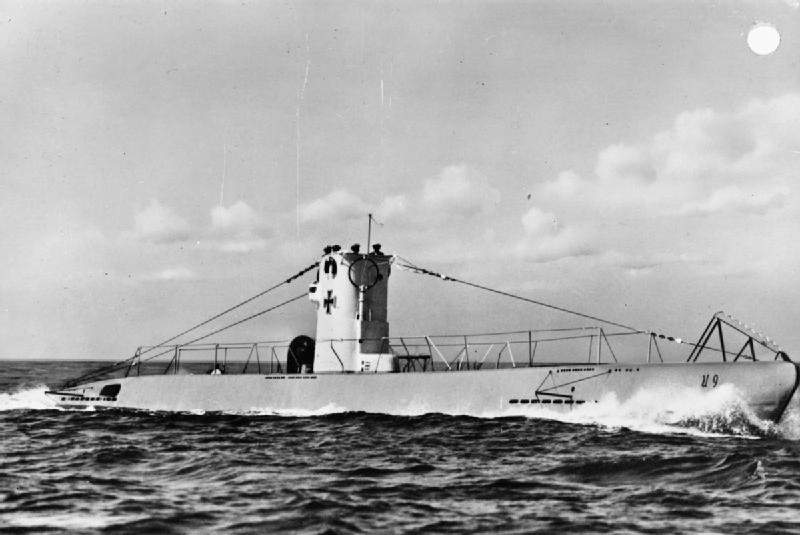
- U-9, a typical Type IIB boat

History

Nazi Germany
- Name: U-121
- Ordered: 28 September 1937
- Builder: Flender Werke, Lübeck
- Yard number: 269
- Laid down: 16 April 1938
- Launched: 20 April 1940
- Commissioned: 28 May 1940
- Fate: Scuttled 5 May 1945 at Bremerhaven; Raised and scrapped, 1950

General characteristics
- Class & type: Type IIB coastal submarine
- Displacement: 279 t (275 long tons) surfaced; 328 t (323 long tons) submerged
- Length: 42.70 m (140 ft 1 in) o/a; 27.80 m (91 ft 2 in) pressure hull
- Beam: 4.08 m (13 ft 5 in) (o/a); 4.00 m (13 ft 1 in) (pressure hull)
- Height: 8.60 m (28 ft 3 in)
- Draught: 3.90 m (12 ft 10 in)
- Installed power: 700 PS (510 kW; 690 bhp) (diesels); 410 PS (300 kW; 400 shp) (electric)
- Propulsion: 2 shafts; 2 × diesel engines; 2 × electric motors
- Speed: 13 knots (24 km/h; 15 mph) surfaced; 7 knots (13 km/h; 8.1 mph) submerged
- Range: 1,800 nmi (3,300 km; 2,100 mi) at 12 knots (22 km/h; 14 mph) surfaced; 35–43 nmi (65–80 km; 40–49 mi) at 4 knots (7.4 km/h; 4.6 mph) submerged
- Test depth: 80 m (260 ft)
- Complement: 3 officers, 22 men
- Armament: 3 × 53.3 cm (21 in) torpedo tubes; 5 × torpedoes or up to 12 TMA or 18 TMB mines; 1 × 2 cm (0.79 in) anti-aircraft gun

Service record
- Part of: U-boat School Flotilla; 28 May – 30 June 1940; 21st U-boat Flotilla; 1 July 1940 – 25 March 1942; 24th U-boat Flotilla; 26 March – 15 May 1942; 21st U-boat Flotilla; 16 May 1942 – 16 March 1945; 31st U-boat Flotilla; 17 March - 5 May 1945
- Identification codes: M 01 240
- Commanders: Oblt.z.S. / Kptlt. Karl-Ernst Schroeter; 28 May 1940 - 30 March 1941; Oblt.z.S. Otto Harms; October - 5 November 1940; Oblt.z.S. Adalbert Schnee; 6 - 27 November 1940; Oblt.z.S. Egon-Reiner von Schlippenbach; 31 March - 8 July 1941; Kptlt. Gert Hetschko; 9 July 1941 - 25 March 1942; Lt.z.S. / Oblt.z.S. Ernst von Witzendorff; 26 March - 19 April 1942; Lt.z.S. / Oblt.z.S. Otto Westphalen; 16 May 1942 - 8 February 1943; Lt.z.S. Otto Hübschen; September - December 1942; Oblt.z.S. Ewald Hülsenbeck; 9 February 1943 - 22 February 1944; Oblt.z.S.d.R Friedrich Horst; 23 February 1944 - 5 May 1945
- Operations: No patrols
- Victories: No ships sunk or damaged

German submarine U-121 was a long-lived Type IIB U-boat built during World War II for service in Nazi Germany's Kriegsmarine. U-121 spent the entire war as a training vessel and was scuttled at the end of the conflict.

U-121 was one of two Type II U-boats built at Flender Werke in Lübeck. Like her sister boat U-120 (also built in Lübeck), she was originally constructed for export to China. The advent of World War II and the increased training needs of the U-Boot-Waffe led the German high command to assign U-120 and U-121 to the training command instead.

== Built for China ==
The Chinese Nationalist Government used 10,000,000 Marks to order two Type IIB U-boats in 1937. They also dispatched 80 men to Germany for training in submarine operations. The Japanese Government complained over this transaction, so the Chinese took their money back and the pair of Type IIB submarines joined the Kriegsmarine after the outbreak of the Second World War in Europe. They were U-120 and U-121.

== Design ==
German Type IIB submarines were enlarged versions of the original Type IIs. U-121 had a displacement of 279 tonnes (275 long tons) when at the surface and 328 tonnes (323 long tons) while submerged. Officially, the standard tonnage was 250 long tons (254 t), however. The U-boat had a total length of 42.70 m (140 ft 1 in), a pressure hull length of 28.20 m (92 ft 6 in), a beam of 4.08 m (13 ft 5 in), a height of 8.60 m (28 ft 3 in), and a draught of 3.90 m (12 ft 10 in). The submarine was powered by two MWM RS 127 S four-stroke, six-cylinder diesel engines of 700 metric horsepower (510 kW; 690 shp) for cruising, two Siemens-Schuckert PG VV 322/36 double-acting electric motors producing a total of 460 metric horsepower (340 kW; 450 shp) for use while submerged. She had two shafts and two 0.85 m (3 ft) propellers. The boat was capable of operating at depths of up to 80–150 metres (260–490 ft).

The submarine had a maximum surface speed of 12 knots (22 km/h; 14 mph) and a maximum submerged speed of 7 knots (13 km/h; 8.1 mph). When submerged, the boat could operate for 35–42 nautical miles (65–78 km; 40–48 mi) at 4 knots (7.4 km/h; 4.6 mph); when surfaced, she could travel 3,800 nautical miles (7,000 km; 4,400 mi) at 8 knots (15 km/h; 9.2 mph). U-121 was fitted with three 53.3 cm (21 in) torpedo tubes at the bow, five torpedoes or up to twelve Type A torpedo mines, and a 2 cm (0.79 in) anti-aircraft gun. The boat had a complement of twentyfive.

== Bibliography ==
- Busch, Rainer; Röll, Hans-Joachim (1999). German U-boat commanders of World War II : a biographical dictionary. Translated by Brooks, Geoffrey. London, Annapolis, Md: Greenhill Books, Naval Institute Press. ISBN 1-55750-186-6.
- Busch, Rainer; Röll, Hans-Joachim (1999). Deutsche U-Boot-Verluste von September 1939 bis Mai 1945 [German U-boat losses from September 1939 to May 1945]. Der U-Boot-Krieg (in German). Vol. IV. Hamburg, Berlin, Bonn: Mittler. ISBN 3-8132-0514-2.
- Gröner, Erich; Jung, Dieter; Maass, Martin (1991). German Warships 1815–1945, U-boats and Mine Warfare Vessels. Vol. 2. Translated by Thomas, Keith; Magowan, Rachel. London: Conway Maritime Press. ISBN 0-85177-593-4.
- Blair, Clay (1996). Hitler's U-Boat War: The Hunters 1939-1942. New York: Random House. ISBN 0-394-58839-8.
