= German submarine U-752 =

German World War II submarine

History

Nazi Germany
- Name: U-752
- Ordered: 9 October 1939
- Builder: Kriegsmarinewerft Wilhelmshaven
- Yard number: 135
- Laid down: 5 January 1940
- Launched: 29 March 1941
- Commissioned: 24 May 1941
- Fate: Scuttled on 23 May 1943 after air rocket attack in North Atlantic

General characteristics
- Class & type: Type VIIC submarine
- Displacement: 769 tonnes (757 long tons) surfaced; 871 t (857 long tons) submerged
- Length: 67.10 m (220 ft 2 in) o/a; 50.50 m (165 ft 8 in) pressure hull
- Beam: 6.20 m (20 ft 4 in) o/a; 4.70 m (15 ft 5 in) pressure hull
- Height: 9.60 m (31 ft 6 in)
- Draught: 4.74 m (15 ft 7 in)
- Installed power: 2,800–3,200 PS (2,100–2,400 kW; 2,800–3,200 bhp) (diesels); 750 PS (550 kW; 740 shp) (electric)
- Propulsion: 2 shafts; 2 × diesel engines; 2 × electric motors
- Speed: 17.7 knots (32.8 km/h; 20.4 mph) surfaced; 7.6 knots (14.1 km/h; 8.7 mph) submerged
- Range: 8,500 nmi (15,700 km; 9,800 mi) at 10 knots (19 km/h; 12 mph) surfaced; 80 nmi (150 km; 92 mi) at 4 knots (7.4 km/h; 4.6 mph) submerged
- Test depth: 230 m (750 ft); Crush depth: 250–295 m (820–968 ft)
- Complement: 4 officers, 40–56 enlisted
- Armament: 5 × 53.3 cm (21 in) torpedo tubes (four bow, one stern); 14 × torpedoes or 26 TMA mines; 1 × 8.8 cm (3.46 in) deck gun (220 rounds); 1 x 2 cm (0.79 in) C/30 AA gun

Service record
- Part of: 3rd U-boat Flotilla; 24 May 1941 – 23 May 1943
- Identification codes: M 44 442
- Commanders: Kptlt. / K.Kapt. Karl-Ernst Schroeter; 24 May 1941 – 23 May 1943
- Operations: 9 patrols: 1st patrol: a. 23 August – 17 September 1941; b. 19 – 23 September 1941; c. 18 – 22 October 1941; 2nd patrol: 7 – 18 November 1941; 3rd patrol: 22 November – 10 December 1941; 4th patrol: a. 4 – 5 February 1942; b. 7 – 10 February 1942; c. 12 February – 13 March 1942; 5th patrol: 28 March – 21 May 1942; 6th patrol: 2 July – 4 September 1942; 7th patrol: a. 19 – 21 October 1942; b. 22 October – 3 December 1942; 8th patrol: 9 January – 15 February 1943; 9th patrol: 22 April – 23 May 1943
- Victories: 7 merchant ships sunk (32,966 GRT); 2 auxiliary warships sunk (1,134 GRT); 1 merchant ship damaged (4,799 GRT)

German submarine U-752 was a Type VIIC U-boat built for Nazi Germany's Kriegsmarine for service during World War II.

== Design ==
German Type VIIC submarines were preceded by the shorter Type VIIB submarines. U-752 had a displacement of 769 tonnes (757 long tons) when at the surface and 871 tonnes (857 long tons) while submerged. She had a total length of 67.10 m (220 ft 2 in), a pressure hull length of 50.50 m (165 ft 8 in), a beam of 6.20 m (20 ft 4 in), a height of 9.60 m (31 ft 6 in), and a draught of 4.74 m (15 ft 7 in). The submarine was powered by two Germaniawerft F46 four-stroke, six-cylinder supercharged diesel engines producing a total of 2,800 to 3,200 metric horsepower (2,060 to 2,350 kW; 2,760 to 3,160 shp) for use while surfaced, two Garbe, Lahmeyer & Co. RP 137/c double-acting electric motors producing a total of 750 metric horsepower (550 kW; 740 shp) for use while submerged. She had two shafts and two 1.23 m (4 ft) propellers. The boat was capable of operating at depths of up to 230 metres (750 ft).

The submarine had a maximum surface speed of 17.7 knots (32.8 km/h; 20.4 mph) and a maximum submerged speed of 7.6 knots (14.1 km/h; 8.7 mph). When submerged, the boat could operate for 80 nautical miles (150 km; 92 mi) at 4 knots (7.4 km/h; 4.6 mph); when surfaced, she could travel 8,500 nautical miles (15,700 km; 9,800 mi) at 10 knots (19 km/h; 12 mph). U-752 was fitted with five 53.3 cm (21 in) torpedo tubes (four fitted at the bow and one at the stern), fourteen torpedoes, one 8.8 cm (3.46 in) SK C/35 naval gun, 220 rounds, and a 2 cm (0.79 in) C/30 anti-aircraft gun. The boat had a complement of between forty-four and sixty.

== Service history ==
She served with 3rd U-boat Flotilla from 24 May 1941 until 23 May 1943 under the command of Korvettenkapitän Karl-Ernst Schroeter. U-752 completed nine wartime patrols and sank nine ships and damaged one.

=== Fate ===
Thirty-two days into her ninth patrol, on 23 May 1943, U-752 was attacked by Fairey Swordfish aircraft attached to the British escort carrier HMS Archer in the mid-Atlantic. A Rocket Spear, a new weapon with a solid cast iron head, entered and left the pressure hull leaving large holes, thus preventing the U-boat from diving. At the arrival of enemy surface craft, the surviving crew of 17 scuttled the boat and abandoned ship. This was the first success of the Rocket Spear. U-752 sank with 30 men. Heinz Krey was one of them.

=== Wolfpacks ===
U-752 took part in ten wolfpacks, namely:

- Westwall (2 – 12 March 1942)
- Hai (3 – 21 July 1942)
- Schlagetot (9 – 21 November 1942)
- Habicht (10 – 19 January 1943)
- Haudegen (19 January – 9 February 1943)
- Amsel 3 (4 – 6 May 1943)
- Rhein (7 – 10 May 1943)
- Elbe 1 (10 – 14 May 1943)
- Oder (17 – 19 May 1943)
- Mosel (19 – 23 May 1943)

== Summary of raiding history ==
Date	Ship Name	Nationality	Tonnage (GRT)	Fate
25 August 1941	T-898 (No 44)	Soviet Navy	553	Sunk
27 August 1941	RT-8 Seld´	Soviet Union	608	Sunk
15 November 1941	T-889 (No 34)	Soviet Navy	581	Sunk
21 April 1942	West Imboden	United States	5,751	Sunk
23 April 1942	Reinholt	Norway	4,799	Damaged
1 May 1942	Bidevind	Norway	4,956	Sunk
23 July 1942	Garmula	United Kingdom	5,254	Sunk
27 July 1942	Leikanger	Norway	4,003	Sunk
9 August 1942	Menanau	Netherlands	6,047	Sunk
13 August 1942	Cripple Creek	United States	6,347	Sunk

== Bibliography ==
- Busch, Rainer; Röll, Hans-Joachim (1999a). German U-boat commanders of World War II : a biographical dictionary. Translated by Brooks, Geoffrey. London, Annapolis, Md: Greenhill Books, Naval Institute Press. ISBN 1-55750-186-6.
- Busch, Rainer; Röll, Hans-Joachim (1999b). Der U-Boot-Krieg, 1939-1945: Deutsche U-Boot-Verluste von September 1939 bis Mai 1945 [German U-boat losses from September 1939 to May 1945] (in German). Vol. IV. Hamburg, Berlin, Bonn: Mittler. ISBN 3-8132-0514-2.
- Gröner, Eric; Jung, Dieter; Maass, Martin (1991). German Warships 1815-1945: U-boats and Mine Warfare Vessels. Vol. 2. Translated by Thomas, Keith; Magowan, Rachel. London: Conway Maritime Press. ISBN 0-85177-593-4.
