= German submarine U-654 =

German World War II submarine

History

Nazi Germany
- Name: U-654
- Ordered: 9 October 1939
- Builder: Howaldtswerke, Hamburg
- Yard number: 803
- Laid down: 1 June 1940
- Launched: 3 May 1941
- Commissioned: 5 July 1941
- Fate: Sunk on 22 August 1942 in the Caribbean Sea in position 12°00′N 79°56′W, by depth charges from a USAAF Douglas B-18 aircraft.

General characteristics
- Class & type: Type VIIC submarine
- Displacement: 769 tonnes (757 long tons) surfaced; 871 t (857 long tons) submerged
- Length: 67.10 m (220 ft 2 in) o/a; 50.50 m (165 ft 8 in) pressure hull
- Beam: 6.20 m (20 ft 4 in) o/a; 4.70 m (15 ft 5 in) pressure hull
- Height: 9.60 m (31 ft 6 in)
- Draught: 4.74 m (15 ft 7 in)
- Installed power: 2,800–3,200 PS (2,100–2,400 kW; 2,800–3,200 bhp) (diesels); 750 PS (550 kW; 740 shp) (electric)
- Propulsion: 2 shafts; 2 × diesel engines; 2 × electric motors
- Speed: 17.7 knots (32.8 km/h; 20.4 mph) surfaced; 7.6 knots (14.1 km/h; 8.7 mph) submerged
- Range: 8,500 nmi (15,700 km; 9,800 mi) at 10 knots (19 km/h; 12 mph) surfaced; 80 nmi (150 km; 92 mi) at 4 knots (7.4 km/h; 4.6 mph) submerged
- Test depth: 230 m (750 ft); Crush depth: 250–295 m (820–968 ft)
- Complement: 4 officers, 40–56 enlisted
- Armament: 5 × 53.3 cm (21 in) torpedo tubes (four bow, one stern); 14 × torpedoes or 26 TMA mines; 1 × 8.8 cm (3.46 in) deck gun (220 rounds); 1 x 2 cm (0.79 in) C/30 AA gun

Service record
- Part of: 5th U-boat Flotilla; 5 July – 31 October 1941; 1st U-boat Flotilla; 1 November 1941 – 22 August 1942
- Identification codes: M 46 564
- Commanders: K.Kapt. Hans-Joachim Hesse; 5 July – 24 November 1941; Oblt.z.S. Ludwig Forster; 2 December 1941 – 22 August 1942
- Operations: 4 patrols: 1st patrol: 15 – 25 December 1941; 2nd patrol: 3 January – 19 February 1942; 3rd patrol: a. 21 March – 19 May 1942; b. 9 – 10 July 1942; 4th patrol: 11 July – 22 August 1942
- Victories: 3 merchant ships sunk (17,755 GRT); 1 warship sunk (900 tons)

German submarine U-654 was a Type VIIC U-boat that was built for Nazi Germany's Kriegsmarine for service during World War II. She was laid down on 1 June 1940 by Howaldtswerke, Hamburg as yard number 803, launched on 3 May 1941 and commissioned on 5 July 1941 under Korvettenkapitän Hans-Joachim Hesse.

== Design ==
German Type VIIC submarines were preceded by the shorter Type VIIB submarines. U-654 had a displacement of 769 tonnes (757 long tons) when at the surface and 871 tonnes (857 long tons) while submerged. She had a total length of 67.10 m (220 ft 2 in), a pressure hull length of 50.50 m (165 ft 8 in), a beam of 6.20 m (20 ft 4 in), a height of 9.60 m (31 ft 6 in), and a draught of 4.74 m (15 ft 7 in). The submarine was powered by two Germaniawerft F46 four-stroke, six-cylinder supercharged diesel engines producing a total of 2,800 to 3,200 metric horsepower (2,060 to 2,350 kW; 2,760 to 3,160 shp) for use while surfaced, two Siemens-Schuckert GU 343/38-8 double-acting electric motors producing a total of 750 metric horsepower (550 kW; 740 shp) for use while submerged. She had two shafts and two 1.23 m (4 ft) propellers. The boat was capable of operating at depths of up to 230 metres (750 ft).

The submarine had a maximum surface speed of 17.7 knots (32.8 km/h; 20.4 mph) and a maximum submerged speed of 7.6 knots (14.1 km/h; 8.7 mph). When submerged, the boat could operate for 80 nautical miles (150 km; 92 mi) at 4 knots (7.4 km/h; 4.6 mph); when surfaced, she could travel 8,500 nautical miles (15,700 km; 9,800 mi) at 10 knots (19 km/h; 12 mph). U-654 was fitted with five 53.3 cm (21 in) torpedo tubes (four fitted at the bow and one at the stern), fourteen torpedoes, one 8.8 cm (3.46 in) SK C/35 naval gun, 220 rounds, and a 2 cm (0.79 in) C/30 anti-aircraft gun. The boat had a complement of between forty-four and sixty.

== Service history ==
The boat's career began with training at 5th U-boat Flotilla on 5 July 1941, followed by active service on 1 November 1941 as part of the 1st Flotilla for the remainder of her service. In four patrols she sank three merchant ships, for a total of 17,755 gross register tons (GRT) and one warship.

=== Wolfpacks ===
U-654 took part in one wolfpack, namely:

- Zieten (6 – 22 January 1942)

=== Fate ===
U-654 was sunk on 22 August 1942 in the Caribbean, around 200 miles/300 km north of Panama City, in position 12°00′N 79°56′W, by the depth charges from a United States Army Air Forces Douglas B-18 Bolo aircraft of the 45th Bombardment Squadron. All hands were lost.

== Summary of raiding history ==
Date	Ship Name	Nationality	Tonnage (Note: Merchant ship tonnages are in gross register tons. Military vessels are listed by tons displacement.)	Fate
9 February 1942	FFL Alysse	Free French Naval Forces	900	Sunk
10 April 1942	Empire Prairie	United Kingdom	7,010	Sunk
20 April 1942	Steel Maker	United States	6,176	Sunk
20 April 1942	Agra	Sweden	4,569	Sunk

== Bibliography ==
- Busch, Rainer; Röll, Hans-Joachim (1999). German U-boat commanders of World War II : a biographical dictionary. Translated by Brooks, Geoffrey. London, Annapolis, Md: Greenhill Books, Naval Institute Press. ISBN 1-55750-186-6.
- Busch, Rainer; Röll, Hans-Joachim (1999). Der U-Boot-Krieg, 1939-1945: Deutsche U-Boot-Verluste von September 1939 bis Mai 1945 [German U-boat losses from September 1939 to May 1945] (in German). Vol. IV. Hamburg, Berlin, Bonn: Mittler. ISBN 3-8132-0514-2.
- Gröner, Eric; Jung, Dieter; Maass, Martin (1991). German Warships 1815-1945: U-boats and Mine Warfare Vessels. Vol. 2. Translated by Thomas, Keith; Magowan, Rachel. London: Conway Maritime Press. ISBN 0-85177-593-4.
- Sharpe, Peter (1998). U-Boat Fact File, 1935-1945. Great Britain: Midland Publishing. ISBN 1-85780-072-9.
