= German submarine U-154 (1941) =

German World War II submarine

Coordinates: 34°00′N 19°18′W

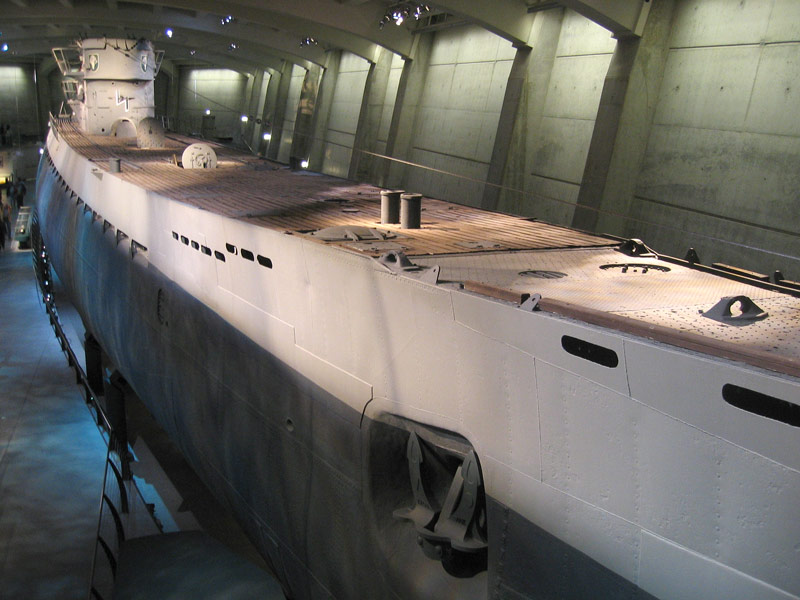
- U-505, a typical Type IXC boat

History

Nazi Germany
- Name: U-154
- Ordered: 25 September 1939
- Builder: DeSchiMAG AG Weser, Bremen
- Yard number: 996
- Laid down: 21 September 1940
- Launched: 21 April 1941
- Commissioned: 2 August 1941
- Fate: Sunk on 3 July 1944

General characteristics
- Class & type: Type IXC submarine
- Displacement: 1,120 t (1,100 long tons) surfaced; 1,232 t (1,213 long tons) submerged
- Length: 76.76 m (251 ft 10 in) o/a; 58.75 m (192 ft 9 in) pressure hull
- Beam: 6.76 m (22 ft 2 in) o/a; 4.40 m (14 ft 5 in) pressure hull
- Height: 9.60 m (31 ft 6 in)
- Draught: 4.70 m (15 ft 5 in)
- Installed power: 4,400 PS (3,200 kW; 4,300 bhp) (diesels); 1,000 PS (740 kW; 990 shp) (electric)
- Propulsion: 2 shafts; 2 × diesel engines; 2 × electric motors
- Speed: 18.3 knots (33.9 km/h; 21.1 mph) surfaced; 7.3 knots (13.5 km/h; 8.4 mph) submerged
- Range: 13,450 nmi (24,910 km; 15,480 mi) at 10 knots (19 km/h; 12 mph) surfaced; 64 nmi (119 km; 74 mi) at 4 knots (7.4 km/h; 4.6 mph) submerged
- Test depth: 230 m (750 ft)
- Complement: 4 officers, 44 enlisted
- Armament: 6 × torpedo tubes (4 bow, 2 stern); 22 × 53.3 cm (21 in) torpedoes; 1 × 10.5 cm (4.1 in) SK C/32 deck gun (180 rounds); 1 × 3.7 cm (1.5 in) SK C/30 AA gun; 1 × twin 2 cm FlaK 30 AA guns

Service record
- Part of: 4th U-boat Flotilla; 2 August 1941 – 31 January 1942; 2nd U-boat Flotilla; 1 February 1942 – 3 July 1944
- Identification codes: M 45 897
- Commanders: K.Kapt. Walther Kölle; 2 August – 7 October 1942; K.Kapt. Heinrich Schuh; 7 October 1942 – 8 February 1943; Oblt.z.S. Oskar-Heinz Kusch; 8 February 1943 – 21 January 1944; Oblt.z.S. Gerth Cemeiner; 22 January – 3 July 1944
- Operations: 8 patrols: 1st patrol: 7 February – 1 March 1942; 2nd patrol: 11 March – 9 May 1942; 3rd patrol: 4 June – 23 August 1942; 4th patrol: 12 October 1942 – 7 January 1943; 5th patrol: a. 20 March – 6 July 1943; b. 23 – 24 September 1943; 6th patrol: 2 October – 20 December 1943; 7th patrol: 31 January – 28 April 1944; 8th patrol: 20 June – 3 July 1944
- Victories: 10 merchant ships sunk (49,288 GRT); 1 merchant ship total loss (8,166 GRT); 2 merchant ships damaged (15,771 GRT)

German submarine U-154 was a Type IXC U-boat of Nazi Germany's Kriegsmarine built for service during World War II. The keel for this boat was laid down on 21 September 1940 at the DeSchiMAG AG Weser yard in Bremen, Germany as yard number 996. She was launched on 21 April 1941 and commissioned on 2 August under the command of Korvettenkapitän Walther Kölle.

The submarine began her service life with training as part of the 4th U-boat Flotilla; moving on to the 2nd flotilla for operations. She conducted eight patrols, sinking ten ships.

Although she was believed to be sunk by the Colombian Destroyer ARC Caldas during a short encounter near San Andrés Island in 1944, the U-154 escaped without damage. Using spare oil and some damaged torpedo tubes, the Germans were able to fake the oil slick and wreckage.

U-154 was sunk by the US destroyer escorts USS Inch and Frost northwest of Madeira on 3 July 1944.

== Design ==
German Type IXC submarines were slightly larger than the original Type IXBs. U-154 had a displacement of 1,120 tonnes (1,100 long tons) when at the surface and 1,232 tonnes (1,213 long tons) while submerged. The U-boat had a total length of 76.76 m (251 ft 10 in), a pressure hull length of 58.75 m (192 ft 9 in), a beam of 6.76 m (22 ft 2 in), a height of 9.60 m (31 ft 6 in), and a draught of 4.70 m (15 ft 5 in). The submarine was powered by two MAN M 9 V 40/46 supercharged four-stroke, nine-cylinder diesel engines producing a total of 4,400 metric horsepower (3,240 kW; 4,340 shp) for use while surfaced, two Siemens-Schuckert 2 GU 345/34 double-acting electric motors producing a total of 1,000 metric horsepower (740 kW; 990 shp) for use while submerged. She had two shafts and two 1.92 m (6 ft) propellers. The boat was capable of operating at depths of up to 230 metres (750 ft).

The submarine had a maximum surface speed of 18.3 knots (33.9 km/h; 21.1 mph) and a maximum submerged speed of 7.3 knots (13.5 km/h; 8.4 mph). When submerged, the boat could operate for 63 nautical miles (117 km; 72 mi) at 4 knots (7.4 km/h; 4.6 mph); when surfaced, she could travel 13,450 nautical miles (24,910 km; 15,480 mi) at 10 knots (19 km/h; 12 mph). U-154 was fitted with six 53.3 cm (21 in) torpedo tubes (four fitted at the bow and two at the stern), 22 torpedoes, one 10.5 cm (4.13 in) SK C/32 naval gun, 180 rounds, and a 3.7 cm (1.5 in) SK C/30 as well as a 2 cm (0.79 in) C/30 anti-aircraft gun. The boat had a complement of forty-eight.

== Service history ==
=== First patrol ===
The boat's first patrol began with her departure from Kiel on 7 February 1942. She headed for the Atlantic Ocean west of Ireland via the gap between the Faroe and Shetland Islands. She docked at Lorient in occupied France, on 1 March.

=== Second patrol ===
For her second sortie, she sailed to the Caribbean, sinking Como Rico on 4 April 1942, about 225 nmi (417 km; 259 mi) north of St. Juan, in Puerto Rico. Her success continued with the sinking of Catahoula, Delvalle, Empire Amethyst and Vineland, all near Haiti and the Dominican Republic.

=== Third, fourth and fifth patrols ===
Her third patrol saw her cross the Atlantic once more. She sank Tillie Lykes on 28 June 1942, about 100 nmi (190 km; 120 mi) south of Santo Domingo in the Dominican Republic and Lalita, using the deck gun, in the Yucatán Channel on 6 July.

One of the boat's victims on this, her fourth patrol, was Nurmahal. She was sunk on 9 November 1942 300 nmi (560 km; 350 mi) east of Martinique "in less than thirty seconds." Another was Tower Grange, sunk 250 nmi (460 km; 290 mi) off Cayenne in French Guiana.

Having made the short trip from Lorient to Brest, the submarine's fifth foray was her longest (109 days) and second most successful. Amongst many others, she attacked Florida. Although the ship had her back broken on 28 May 1943, she was eventually repaired.

=== Sixth, seventh and eighth patrols and loss ===
She departed on patrol number six on 2 October 1943. U-154 was attacked by an unidentified PBY Catalina flying boat on 3 November; she was also twice attacked on the 22nd. None caused any damage. The boat returned to Lorient on 20 December.

She was then attacked on 13 March 1944, possibly by the US Navy patrol boat USS PC-469 north of the Panama Canal; only minor damage was sustained. U-154 was also engaged on 29 March by the Colombian Navy destroyer ARC Caldas. She returned to France, again to Lorient, on 28 April 1944.

U-154 was sunk by the US destroyer escorts USS Inch and Frost northwest of Madeira on 3 July 1944.

=== Wolfpacks ===
U-154 took part in one wolfpack, namely:

- Südwärts (24 – 26 October 1942)

== Postscript ==
Oblt.z.S. Oskar Kusch, who had commanded the boat in 1943 and the first month of 1944 and successfully attacked three ships, was court-martialled and shot in May 1944, having been reported by his first officer, Ulrich Abel and his chief engineer, Kurt Druschel for Wehrkraftzersetzung (sedition and defeatism). Kusch had removed Hitler's portrait from the boat and had repeatedly called him an idiot and described the Nazis as tapeworms. Ironically Ulrich Abel, who subsequently gained his own command on U-193 was killed before Kusch's murder, when U-193 was sunk in April 1944 on her first patrol under his command. Druschel was killed when U-154 was sunk on 3 July 1944. It was not until the 1990s that Kusch's legal record was wiped clean and a memorial to his memory was erected, Oskar-Kusch-Strasse, a street in Kiel, Germany is named after him.

== Summary of raiding history ==
Date	Name	Nationality	Tonnage (GRT)	Fate
4 April 1942	Comol Rico	United States	5,034	Sunk
5 April 1942	Catahoula	United States	5,030	Sunk
12 April 1942	Delvalle	United States	5,032	Sunk
13 April 1942	Empire Amethyst	United Kingdom	8,032	Sunk
20 April 1942	Vineland	Canada	5,587	Sunk
28 June 1942	Tillie Lykes	United States	2,572	Sunk
6 July 1942	Lalita	Panama	65	Sunk
8 November 1942	D'Entrecasteaux	United Kingdom	7,291	Sunk
9 November 1942	Nurmahal	United Kingdom	5,419	Sunk
18 November 1942	Tower Grange	United Kingdom	5,226	Sunk
28 May 1943	Cardinal Gibbons	United States	7,191	Damaged
28 May 1943	Florida	United States	8,580	Damaged
28 May 1943	John Worthington	United States	8,166	Total loss

== Bibliography ==
- Busch, Rainer; Röll, Hans-Joachim (1999). German U-boat commanders of World War II : a biographical dictionary. Translated by Brooks, Geoffrey. London, Annapolis, Md: Greenhill Books, Naval Institute Press. ISBN 1-55750-186-6.
- Busch, Rainer; Röll, Hans-Joachim (1999). Deutsche U-Boot-Verluste von September 1939 bis Mai 1945 [German U-boat losses from September 1939 to May 1945]. Der U-Boot-Krieg (in German). Vol. IV. Hamburg, Berlin, Bonn: Mittler. ISBN 3-8132-0514-2.
- Gröner, Erich; Jung, Dieter; Maass, Martin (1991). U-boats and Mine Warfare Vessels. German Warships 1815–1945. Vol. 2. Translated by Thomas, Keith; Magowan, Rachel. London: Conway Maritime Press. ISBN 0-85177-593-4.
- Kemp, Paul (1999). U-Boats Destroyed – German Submarine Losses in the World Wars. London: Arms & Armour. ISBN 1-85409-515-3.
- Sharpe, Peter (1998). U-Boat Fact File. Earl Shilton: Midland Publishing. ISBN 1-85780-072-9.
- Rust, Eric C. (2020). U-Boat Commander Oskar Kusch: Anatomy of a Nazi-era Betrayal and Judicial Murder. Annapolis, Maryland: Naval Institute Press. ISBN 978-1682475140.
