= German submarine U-193 =

German World War II submarine

Coordinates: 45°38′N 9°43′W

History

Nazi Germany
- Name: U-193
- Ordered: 4 November 1940
- Builder: AG Weser, Bremen
- Yard number: 1039
- Laid down: 22 December 1941
- Launched: 24 August 1942
- Commissioned: 10 December 1942
- Fate: Missing since 24 April 1944

General characteristics
- Class & type: Type IXC/40 submarine
- Displacement: 1,120 t (1,100 long tons) surfaced; 1,232 t (1,213 long tons) submerged
- Length: 76.76 m (251.8 ft) o/a; 58.75 m (192 ft 9 in) pressure hull
- Beam: 6.90 m (22 ft 8 in) o/a; 4.40 m (14 ft 5 in) pressure hull
- Height: 9.60 m (31 ft 6 in)
- Draught: 4.70 m (15 ft 5 in)
- Installed power: 4,400 PS (3,200 kW; 4,300 bhp) (diesels); 1,000 PS (740 kW; 990 shp) (electric)
- Propulsion: 2 shafts; 2 × diesel engines; 2 × electric motors
- Speed: 18.3 knots (33.9 km/h; 21.1 mph) surfaced; 7.3 knots (13.5 km/h; 8.4 mph) submerged
- Range: 13,850 nmi (25,650 km; 15,940 mi) at 10 knots (19 km/h; 12 mph) surfaced; 117 nmi (217 km; 135 mi) at 4 knots (7.4 km/h; 4.6 mph) submerged
- Test depth: 230 m (750 ft)
- Complement: 4 officers, 44 enlisted48 to 56
- Armament: 6 × torpedo tubes (4 bow, 2 stern); 22 × 53.3 cm (21 in) torpedoes; 1 × 10.5 cm (4.1 in) SK C/32 deck gun (180 rounds); 1 × 3.7 cm (1.5 in) SK C/30 AA gun; 1 × twin 2 cm FlaK 30 AA guns

Service record
- Part of: 4th U-boat Flotilla; 10 December 1942 – 30 April 1943; 2nd U-boat Flotilla; 1 May 1943 – 31 March 1944; 10th U-boat Flotilla; 1 – 23 April 1944
- Identification codes: M 50 201
- Commanders: K.Kapt. Hans Pauckstadt; 10 December 1942 – 31 March 1944; Oblt.z.S. Dr. Ulrich Abel; 1 – 24 April 1944
- Operations: 3 patrols: 1st patrol: a. 22 May – 23 July 1943; b. 21 September 1943; c. 27 – 28 September 1943; 2nd patrol: a. 12 October 1943 – 10 February 1944; b. 20 – 24 February 1944; 3rd patrol: 23 – 24 April 1944
- Victories: 1 merchant ship sunk (10,172 GRT)

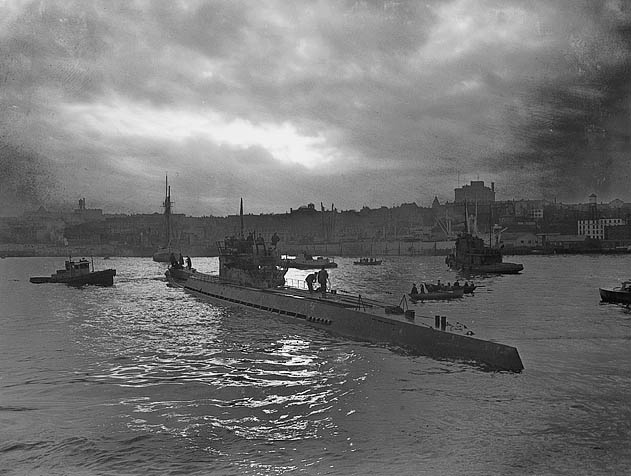
A German U-190 submarine arriving in St. John’s Newfoundland in June 1945

German submarine U-193 was a Type IXC/40 U-boat of Nazi Germany's Kriegsmarine built during World War II for service in the Atlantic Ocean. The submarine was laid down on 22 December 1941 at the AG Weser yard in Bremen as yard number 1039. She was launched on 24 August 1942 and commissioned on 10 December under the command of Korvettenkapitän Hans Paukstadt.

She was a member of two wolfpacks and carried out four war patrols in which she sank one ship, before being lost herself in the Bay of Biscay in April 1944.

== Design ==
German Type IXC/40 submarines were slightly larger than the original Type IXCs. U-193 had a displacement of 1,144 tonnes (1,126 long tons) when at the surface and 1,257 tonnes (1,237 long tons) while submerged. The U-boat had a total length of 76.76 m (251 ft 10 in), a pressure hull length of 58.75 m (192 ft 9 in), a beam of 6.86 m (22 ft 6 in), a height of 9.60 m (31 ft 6 in), and a draught of 4.67 m (15 ft 4 in). The submarine was powered by two MAN M 9 V 40/46 supercharged four-stroke, nine-cylinder diesel engines producing a total of 4,400 metric horsepower (3,240 kW; 4,340 shp) for use while surfaced, two Siemens-Schuckert 2 GU 345/34 double-acting electric motors producing a total of 1,000 shaft horsepower (1,010 PS; 750 kW) for use while submerged. She had two shafts and two 1.92 m (6 ft) propellers. The boat was capable of operating at depths of up to 230 metres (750 ft).

The submarine had a maximum surface speed of 18.3 knots (33.9 km/h; 21.1 mph) and a maximum submerged speed of 7.3 knots (13.5 km/h; 8.4 mph). When submerged, the boat could operate for 63 nautical miles (117 km; 72 mi) at 4 knots (7.4 km/h; 4.6 mph); when surfaced, she could travel 13,850 nautical miles (25,650 km; 15,940 mi) at 10 knots (19 km/h; 12 mph). U-193 was fitted with six 53.3 cm (21 in) torpedo tubes (four fitted at the bow and two at the stern), 22 torpedoes, one 10.5 cm (4.13 in) SK C/32 naval gun, 180 rounds, and a 3.7 cm (1.5 in) SK C/30 as well as a 2 cm (0.79 in) C/30 anti-aircraft gun. The boat had a complement of forty-eight.

== Service history ==
=== First patrol ===
The boat's first patrol was preceded by a short trip from Kiel in Germany to Bergen in Norway in May 1943. She then left the Nordic port on 22 May, heading west. She negotiated the gap between Iceland and the Faroe Islands and entered the Atlantic Ocean.

She did not encounter any Allied shipping, and failed to find her first victory. An unidentified aircraft attacked U-193 south of the Canary Islands on 6 July, wounding two men and destroying the Metox radar detection equipment.

The submarine entered Bordeaux in occupied France, on 23 July.

=== Second and third patrols ===
U-193's second foray began with her departure from La Pallice, (she had moved there in September), on 12 October 1943. Moving to the Gulf of Mexico, she sank the independently sailing 10,172 GRT American oil tanker Touchet west of Florida with the loss of ten of her crew. The remainder of the patrol was a failure, however, as a combination of dud torpedoes, well-organized convoys and effective counter-measures combined to prevent the boat gaining a single hit.

As the second patrol came to an end in February 1944 after five frustrating months at sea, U-193 caused an international incident following an attack by Allied aircraft and convoy escorts off the Spanish coast. In her desperate attempts to escape, she dived straight into the seabed, causing serious damage to the boat. Knowing a journey to a German-held port was now impossible, her captain, Hans Pauckstadt, decided to intern his boat in Ferrol, Spain. Under international law, if U-193 remained in the neutral harbour for more than 24 hours, then the Spanish authorities were obliged to detain the submarine for the remainder of hostilities. This did not occur, U-193 stayed in Ferrol for ten days whilst Spanish workmen performed superficial repairs to the U-boat.

U-193 then left the port despite Allied protests and returned to La Pallice in France, where more extensive repairs were completed and Paukstadt was replaced by Kptlt. Dr. Ulrich Abel. Abel had served as Watch Officer on U-154 under the command of Oskar Kusch. Abel denounced Kusch, which led to Kusch's court martial and execution for defeatism. This six-day passage is often listed as U-193's 'third' patrol, although there was no intention of operating against Allied shipping.

=== Fourth patrol ===
Following repairs, U-193 departed on her fourth and final patrol and was never heard from again. Her loss remains a mystery. A post-war assessment states that on 28 April 1944, she was seen and attacked by a British Royal Air Force Vickers Wellington bomber of No. 612 Squadron RAF, whose depth charges sank the boat with all 59 hands not far from Nantes. This attack was actually against U-802, inflicting no damage. The reason for U-193's loss is unknown; however as the Bay of Biscay was routinely mined by the RAF, it could have been an operational loss.

== Summary of raiding history ==
Date	Ship	Nationality	Tonnage (GRT)	Fate
3 December 1943	Touchet	United States	10,172	Sunk

== Bibliography ==
- Busch, Rainer; Röll, Hans-Joachim (1999). German U-boat commanders of World War II : a biographical dictionary. Translated by Brooks, Geoffrey. London, Annapolis, Md: Greenhill Books, Naval Institute Press. ISBN 1-55750-186-6.
- Busch, Rainer; Röll, Hans-Joachim (1999). Deutsche U-Boot-Verluste von September 1939 bis Mai 1945 [German U-boat losses from September 1939 to May 1945]. Der U-Boot-Krieg (in German). Vol. IV. Hamburg, Berlin, Bonn: Mittler. ISBN 3-8132-0514-2.
- Gröner, Erich; Jung, Dieter; Maass, Martin (1991). U-boats and Mine Warfare Vessels. German Warships 1815–1945. Vol. 2. Translated by Thomas, Keith; Magowan, Rachel. London: Conway Maritime Press. ISBN 0-85177-593-4.
- Kemp, Paul (1999). U-boats destroyed : German submarine losses in the World Wars. London: Arms & Armour. ISBN 1-85409-515-3. OCLC 43972253.
- Sharpe, Peter (1998). U-Boat Fact File. Great Britain: Midland Publishing. ISBN 1-85780-072-9.
