= Oskar Kusch =

German naval officer and U-boat commander (1918-1944)

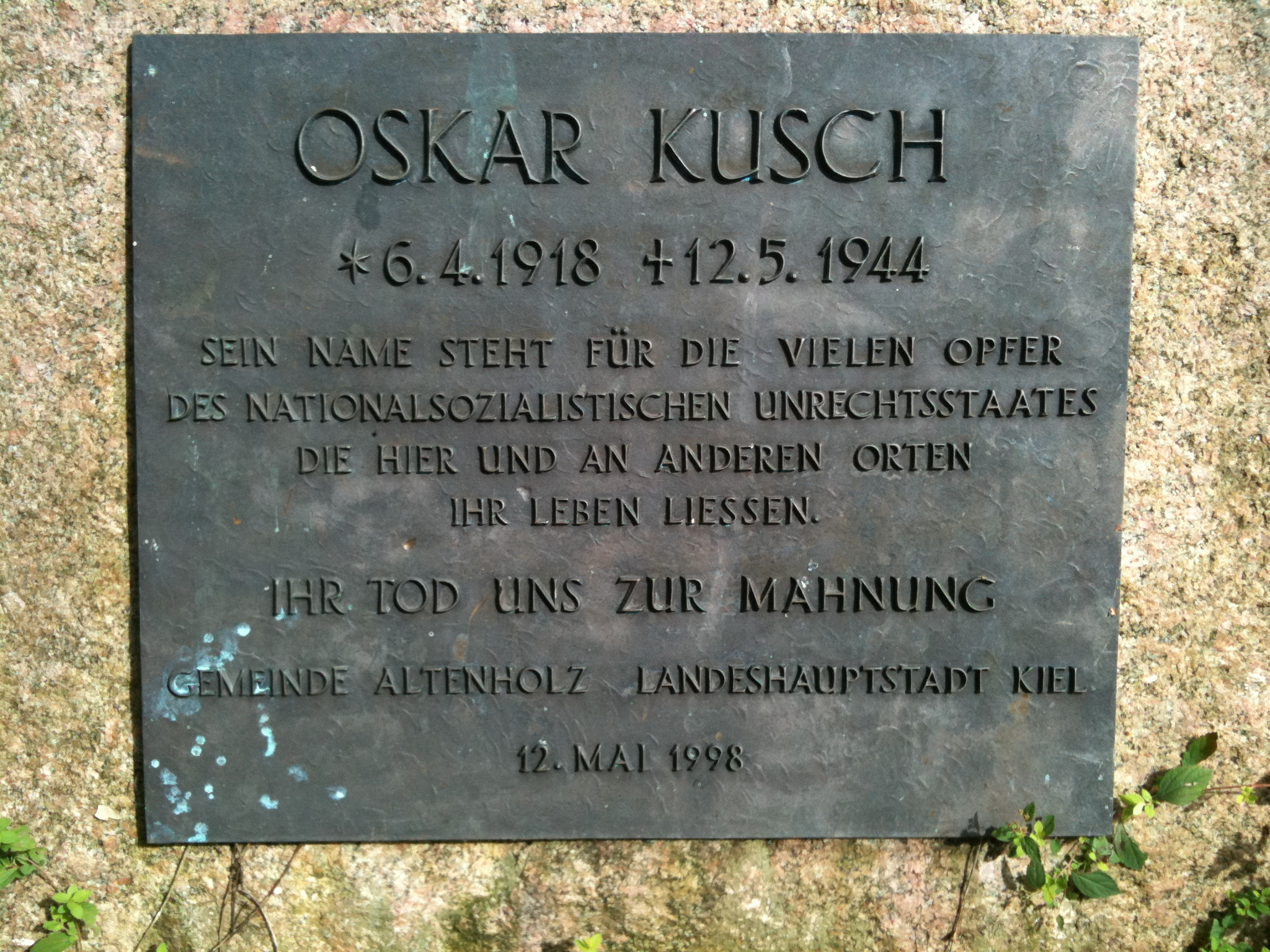
- Memorial to Kusch in Kiel
- Born: 6 April 1918; Berlin
- Died: 12 May 1944 (aged 26); Kiel
- Military career
- Allegiance: Nazi Germany
- Branch: Kriegsmarine
- Service years: 1937–44
- Rank: Kapitänleutnant
- Commands: U-154
- Conflicts: World War II: Battle of the Atlantic
- Awards: Iron Cross 1st class

Oskar Heinz Kusch (6 April 1918 – 12 May 1944) was a German naval officer and U-boat commander in World War II who was executed for comments critical of the Nazi state.

== Early life ==
From 1928 to 1936, Kusch attended the Hohenzollern Gymnasium in Berlin-Schoeneberg, where he received his high school diploma in late 1936. In 1928, at the age of ten, he joined the Bundische Jugend and was a member of the German Freischar and the German Boy Scout Association. The Bundische Jugend was incorporated into the Hitler Youth in 1933. Kusch left the Hitler Youth in 1935. He served his compulsory period in the Reich Labor Service until March 1937. Kusch may have been under Gestapo surveillance during this time. According to Berlin police records, from October 1936 to March 1937, Kusch had written letters to his former Bündische Jugend leader criticising the Reich Labor Service.

== Military career ==
Kusch joined the Kriegsmarine on 3 April 1937 as a naval officer candidate in Class 37a. Kusch was stationed on the light cruiser Emden from 3 April 1939 to 31 March 1940 after serving on various training ships and taking part in courses as a Fähnrich zur See. From 1 April to 27 September 1940 he trained as a watch officer in the U-boat force. On 25 June 1941 he was deployed for the first time on board U-103 as second watch officer.

He was promoted to Oberleutnant zur See on 1 September 1941 and received the Iron Cross 2nd Class on 10 November 1941. On 5 June 1942 after the end of a patrol on U-103 he was awarded the Iron Cross 1st Class. After completing the commander's course in August 1942, he rejoined U-103 as first watch officer. On 8 February 1943 he was given command of U-154 at Lorient.

=== U-154 ===
The crew strength of the U-154 was 48 men, including four officers (commander, 1st and 2nd watch officers and chief engineer) and 44 non-commissioned officers and men.

==== Kusch's first patrol ====
On 20 March 1943, U-154 left Lorient to set off on its fifth patrol, the first with Kusch in command. Shortly before leaving, Kusch ordered his stoker to remove the picture of Adolf Hitler in the officer's room saying "Take that away, we're not practicing idolatry here". It soon became clear that there were political differences between Kusch and the 1st watch officer Leutnant zur See Ulrich Abel and chief engineer Kurt Druschel, both dedicated Nazis. Abel and Druschel were later described as "typical officers who believed in victory and always proudly referred to themselves as followers of the Führer."

Kusch made no secret of his anti-Nazi attitude; on the contrary, it was known to the entire crew. Because of the limited space on the submarine, word of Kusch's attitude would have spread quickly. Ensign Kirchammer later testified: "[Kusch] once told us ensigns that we should form our own opinions and not allow ourselves to be influenced by propaganda." Kusch spread a joke among the crew: "What do the German people and a tapeworm have in common? They are both surrounded by brown matter and are doomed."

During the patrol, U-154 attacked a convoy off Cape São Roque on the Brazilian coast and sank two freighters and a tanker.

On 3 July 1943, U-126 and U-154 were on their way back to Lorient together when at 02:44 an enemy aircraft appeared and dropped depth charges on the boats. Both U-boats dived immediately to avoid the attack. Since no communication with U-126 was possible after the dive, Kusch assumed that U-126 had continued to dive and was therefore out of range. However U-154 soon heard cracking noises, which indicated the implosion of U-126 due to water pressure. Kusch decided to continue underwater and surfaced 4 nautical miles (7.4 km; 4.6 mi) from the scene of the attack at 07:07 to search for survivors, but broke off the search at 08:33 due to the threat of another attack.

Although Kusch's behavior during the attack and afterwards was assessed as correct by the flotilla commander, according to Kirchammer, Abel seriously reproached Kusch for not having made intensive rescue attempts for the U-126 crew which included one of Abel's friends. "From that moment on, Abel was literally inflamed with hatred and the previous understanding, which he had observed between the officers at least on a professional and comradely level, despite their completely diametrically opposed political views, was completely destroyed from now on." After the patrol, Abel was judged to be unsuitable for the position of commander. The radio mate Janker considered this to be "the real cause that gave rise to the desire for revenge and revenge in Abel."

==== Kusch's second patrol ====
U-154 left Lorient on 2 October 1943. Radio mate Kurt Isensee testified that the political arguments between Kusch and Druschel and Abel became increasingly heated during this patrol:

"As a Sonar operator, I often witnessed political conversations that took place in the officers' lounge, and from which one could clearly see that it was not just about a conversation like on the first trip, but that Druschel and Abel used every opportunity to oppose them. I, too, am firmly convinced that this opposing position arose from offended vanity, which in turn arose from the fact that Lieutenant Abel had to make another trip as a trainee commander."

Isensee said that "apart from two or three scribblers, the entire crew was on the commander's side." He was therefore of the opinion that Kusch's statements would not have been detrimental to the boat's strength. Wehrmacht Medical Officer Hans Nothdurft was also on board this trip to carry out scientific measurements on board a front-line boat under tropical conditions. On 12 June 1946, Nothdurft made an affidavit in front of the CIC Heidelberg, which described living with the officers of U-154. In this document he described Kusch's behavior, but in contrast to Isensee he expressed himself negatively:

"He considered the war criminal and lost, the submarine ridiculous and finished. He foisted this opinion on everyone, though people would not hear it for fear... There were often violent arguments between Abel and Druschel on the one hand and Kusch on the other."

In the course of the second patrol, the officers planned to report Kusch, but according to Nothdurft this was not done at first. He further stated that Abel and Druschel tried to win him over to their side and convince him that Kusch was a coward, a defeatist and anti-Hitler. Abel and Druschel were serious about their plan: they said to Nothdurft: "As a medical officer, you are the senior officer on board. That makes you a splendid leader of our official communication against Kusch. As a member of the army, you are excluded from being able to pursue your own advantages in eliminating Kusch."

Kusch's habit of listening into Allied radio stations was another accusation leveled at him later. According to Nothdurft, Kusch "had the radio officer tune in to hostile stations several times a day." Nothdurft reports that Kusch called Hitler "a madman, a criminal, the worst misfortune that could befall the German people, and a mad carpet-biter." Nothdurft says he saw evidence that Kusch planned to defect and hand the boat over to the enemy. According to Nothdurft, Kusch's political instructions corresponded "without a doubt... occasionally to the request to desert together with the whole boat".

The patrol was unsuccessful and U-154 returned to Lorient on 21 December 1943.

=== Court martial and execution ===
On 12 January 1944, Abel denounced Kusch in a report to the 3rd U-boat Flotilla, although Nothdurft had tried to prevent this. Abel allegedly reported Kusch after hearing a speech by Lieutenant Commander Ernst Kals, who presented Karl Dönitz's "Decree against Criticism and Complaining" of 9 September 1943. During his interrogation on 24 January 1944, Abel denied the accusation that he had written his report out of spite.

On 16 January 1944, Captain Hans-Rudolf Rösing, commander of U-Boote West, initiated preliminary proceedings against Kusch for "undermining the armed forces, insulting the Reich and atrocity propaganda." Kusch was arrested in Lorient on 20 January and taken to the Angers military detention center. He was later transferred to the naval detention center in Kiel. According to the indictment, Kusch was charged with crimes against Section 5 Paragraph 1 Numbers 1 and 2 of the War Special Criminal Law Ordinance and Section 1 of the Ordinance on Extraordinary Broadcasting Measures.

The trial against Kusch began on 26 January 1944 in Kiel at the Court of the Higher Command of Submarine Training chaired by Karl-Heinrich Hagemann, the president naval judge and a staunch Nazi. Kusch's defense attorney had only been given access to the files the evening before. Kusch's former superiors, Lieutenant Gustav-Adolf Janssen and Lieutenant Commander Werner Winter appeared as defense witnesses. Both spoke positively about Kusch, with whom they were friends.

On the evening of 26 January, Kusch was sentenced to death and one year in prison for "continuing to disintegrate the armed forces and for listening to foreign broadcasts" and his civil rights were revoked. The accusation Abel added later of "cowardice in the face of the enemy", however, was rejected by an expert as unfounded. The harsh verdict came as a surprise, since the prosecutor had only applied for a prison sentence of ten and a half years.

Despite Janssen's personal intervention with Grand Admiral Dönitz, he refused a pardon.

On 12 May 1944, Kusch was executed by firing squad in Kiel.

== Aftermath ==
Abel was given command of U-193 which disappeared on its fourth patrol which commenced on 24 April 1944. Druschel died on board U-154 when it was sunk by depth charges near Madeira on 3 July 1944.

After the war, Kusch's father tried to get his son rehabilitated. The public prosecutor's office in Kiel brought two counts of crimes against humanity against Hagemann, the judge who had sentenced Kusch and another lieutenant captain to death. Hagemann testified before the district court in Kiel that he stood by his decision – and was acquitted in September 1950. The district court wrote in its verdict that political motives for the death sentence could not be identified, but that Kusch had failed in the military.

A request from the state parliament member Christel Aschmoneit-Lücke to the Schleswig-Holstein Ministry of Justice made the case public again in the 1990s. Due to the work of the naval historian Heinrich Walle, who had evaluated the case files, Kusch was rehabilitated in 1996. In 1998, the street leading past the execution site was renamed Oskar-Kusch-Straße.

In the historic hall of the Laboe Naval Memorial, a display commemorates the life and fate of Oskar Kusch. In 2021, the German Navy renamed the former Scheer mole at the Kiel naval base Oskar-Kusch-Mole.
