= SS Empire Amethyst =

World War II merchant ship of the United Kingdom

History
- Name: Empire Amethyst
- Owner: Ministry of War Transport
- Operator: Hadley Shipping Co, Middlesbrough
- Port of registry: (United Kingdom) Middlesbrough
- Builder: Furness Shipbuilding Ltd, Haverton Hill-on-Tees
- Yard number: 330
- Launched: 8 July 1941
- Completed: September 1941
- Out of service: 13 April 1942
- Identification: UK Official Number 164848; Code letters BCPL
- Fate: Sunk, 13 April 1942

General characteristics
- Tonnage: 8,032 GRT
- Length: 463 ft 5 in (141.25 m)
- Beam: 61 ft 2 in (18.64 m)
- Depth: 33 ft (10.06 m)
- Propulsion: 1 x triple expansion steam engine (Richardsons, Westgarth & Co Ltd, Hartlepool) 674 hp (503 kW)
- Crew: 47

Position of Empire Amethyst's wreck in the Caribbean Sea

Empire Amethyst was an 8,032-ton tanker which was built in 1941. She was torpedoed and sunk by German submarine U-154 on 13 April 1942 in the Caribbean Sea during World War II.

== History ==
Empire Amethyst was built by the Furness Shipbuilding Co Ltd, Haverton Hill-on-Tees as yard number 330. She was launched on 8 July 1941 and completed in December 1941. Empire Amethyst was built for the Ministry of War Transport and operated under the management of the Hadley Shipping Co Ltd, Middlesbrough. Empire Amethyst was homeported in Middlesbrough.

Empire Amethyst was a member of a number of convoys during the Second World War.

ON 17

Convoy ON 17 sailed from Liverpool on 17 September 1941 and Loch Ewe on 19 September. The convoy dispersed on 29 September.

On 23 January 1942, Empire Amethyst picked up five survivors from the Norwegian SS Innerøy, which had been torpedoed and sunk by U-553. The survivors were taken to Halifax, Nova Scotia.

HX 173

Convoy HX 173 sailed from Halifax for Liverpool on 1 February 1942, arriving on 14 February.

OS 21

Convoy OS 21 sailed from Liverpool on 4 March 1942 and arrived at Freetown, Sierra Leone on 24 March. Empire Amethyst was in ballast, having discharged her cargo at Milford Haven. She had to call at Belfast to allow a crew member to be discharged through illness and a replacement to be taken on board. On reaching Freetown, Empire Amethyst sailed for New Orleans.

== Final voyage and sinking ==
In mid-April 1942, Empire Amethyst left New Orleans bound for Freetown carrying a cargo of 12,000 tons of motor spirit. Her intended route took her via the Lesser Antilles and then across the Atlantic to Freetown.

Empire Amethyst was spotted by the crew of U-154 on 12 April 1942. The U-boat captain, Walther Kölle, believed that she was being escorted by HMCS Prince Henry and did not attack.

At 03:02 hrs Empire Amethyst received a distress call from the American SS Delvalla which had been torpedoed by U-154 and was sinking. Prince Henry headed for the reported position of the Delvalla and a Catalina aircraft was despatched. The survivors were taken aboard Prince Henry.

U-154 spotted Empire Amethyst again at 11:42 hrs; she was again under escort by Prince Henry but at 16:00 hrs the escort had been lost. As he was short of torpedoes, Kapitän Kölle decided to attack from the surface. The chase began at 20:00 hrs with Empire Amethyst zig-zagging but generally following a heading of 110° towards Trinidad. Empire Amethyst managed to lose her pursuer at 00:24 on 13 April by making a sharp turn. At 01:27 hrs, Kölle ordered his engines stopped to try to ascertain where Empire Amethyst was. Kölle decided to head in the direction that Empire Amethyst was generally heading and by 04:30 had found her again. At 05:52, Kölle aimed the first of two torpedoes at Empire Amethyst, which hit under the bridge. The second exploded forward of the engine room and she exploded in a mass of flames that were visible from 30 nautical miles (56 km) away. Empire Amethyst sank with the loss of all 47 crew at 17°40′N 74°50′W.

The crew of Empire Amethyst are commemorated on the Tower Hill Memorial.

== Official number and code letters ==
Official Numbers were a forerunner to IMO Numbers.

Empire Amethyst had the UK official number 164848 and used the Code Letters BCPL.
