= Japanese destroyer Amagiri =

Two warships of Japan have borne the name Amagiri:

- Japanese destroyer Amagiri (1930), a Fubuki-class destroyer launched in 1930 and sunk in 1944
- JDS Amagiri, an Asagiri-class destroyer launched in 1986
