= SS Catahoula =

History

United States
- Name: Catahoula
- Owner: United States Shipping Board (1920); American Fuel & Transportion Company (1920); United States Shipping Board (1921–1922); Curtis Bay Copper & Iron Works (1922–1923); Cuban Distilling Company (1923–1942)
- Builder: American International Shipbuilding Corporation, Philadelphia
- Yard number: 1538
- Launched: 21 July 1920
- Completed: September 1920
- Homeport: Baltimore, Maryland
- Identification: US Official Number 220629; code letters: MBLW
- Fate: Sunk, 5 April 1942

General characteristics
- Type: Design 1022 cargo ship
- Tonnage: 5,030 GRT; 3,105 NRT; 7,500 DWT
- Length: 390.0 ft (118.9 m)
- Beam: 54.2 ft (16.5 m)
- Depth: 27.8 ft (8.5 m)
- Installed power: Oil-fired steam turbines, 2500 ihp
- Propulsion: Single screw
- Speed: 11.5 knots
- Range: 9,000 miles
- Capacity: 344,963 gallons

SS Catahoula was a Design 1022 cargo ship built for the United States Shipping Board immediately after World War I.

== History ==
She was laid down at yard number 1538 at the Philadelphia, Pennsylvania shipyard of the American International Shipbuilding Corporation, one of 110 Design 1022 cargo ships built for the United States Shipping Board. She was completed in 1920 and named Catahoula. In 1920, she was purchased by the American Fuel & Transportation Company and converted into a tanker by the Globe Shipbuilding Company in Baltimore with a 344,963 gallon capacity. In 1921, she was returned to the USSB. In 1922, she was purchased by the Curtis Bay Copper & Iron Works (Baltimore, Maryland). In 1923, she was purchased by the Cuban Distilling Company where she was utilized to transport blackstrap molasses, a byproduct of sugar refining, to the United States where it would be used to produce cattle feed, vinegar and denatured alcohol.

On 5 April 1942, while en route from San Pedro de Macorís to Wilmington, Delaware, she was torpedoed and sunk by German submarine U-154 northeast of the eastern tip of the Dominican Republic (19°16′N 68°12′W). 2 crewman were killed outright and 5 later drowned during the evacuation. 31 crewman and 7 armed guards were rescued the following day by the destroyer Sturtevant who had been alerted by a patrolling plane.

== Bibliography ==
- McKellar, Norman L. "Steel Shipbuilding under the U. S. Shipping Board, 1917-1921, Part II, Contract Steel Ships, p. 588" (PDF). Steel Shipbuilding under the U. S. Shipping Board, 1917-1921. ShipScribe.
- Marine Review (1921). "1920 Construction Record of U.S. Yards -Catahoula". The Marine Review. 51 (February). New York: 17 and 97.
