= List of shipwrecks in January 1942 =

The list of shipwrecks in January 1942 includes all ships sunk, foundered, grounded, or otherwise lost during January 1942.

== 1 January ==
List of shipwrecks: 1 January 1942
Ship	State	Description
Fredanja	Netherlands	The coaster ran aground in the Copeland Islands, County Down, United Kingdom. She was refloated, but capsized and sank.
Kentwood	United Kingdom	World War II: The cargo ship struck a mine and was damaged in the North Sea off Happisburgh, Norfolk. She was taken in tow by a Royal Navy ship but later sank. Her crew were rescued.
Koraltepe	Turkey	World War II: The sailing ship was shelled and sunk in the Black Sea east of Cape Igneada (41°43′N 28°13′E) by ShCh-214 (Soviet Navy).
Malama	United States	World War II: The cargo ship was bombed and damaged in the Pacific Ocean (26°21′S 151°24′W) by an aircraft from Aikoku Maru (Imperial Japanese Navy). Her crew then scuttled the ship. Her 38 crew were rescued by Aikoku Maru and Hōkoku Maru (Imperial Japanese Navy). Malama was on a voyage from Honolulu, Hawaii to Wellington, New Zealand with a cargo of military supplies.
Penrhos	United Kingdom	World War II: The coaster struck a mine and sank in Liverpool Bay with the loss of four lives.
Porpose	Australia	The lighter was lost off the Norman River, north Queensland.
Portmar	Australia	The vessel was lost off the coast of Queensland.
Silver Ray	United Kingdom	The sailing ship was lost off Liverpool, Lancashire.
Stanley A. Griffiths	United States	The cargo ship ran aground and was wrecked in an unknown location. She was later raised, repaired and entered Swedish service as Frej.
Tashkent	Soviet Union	World War II: The cargo ship was bombed and sunk at Feodosia by Luftwaffe aircraft with the loss of seventeen of her crew.
Teiun Maru	Japan	World War II: The government owned transport ship entered a Japanese minefield 2 miles (3.2 km) southwest of Santo Tomas, Luzon, Philippines (16°11′N 120°18′E) and was sunk by a mine. Five troops, two maintenance supervisors of the 5th Air Group, 117 airfield workers and the three Japanese working force supervisors, her commanding officer and Six crewmen were killed. Two Daihatsu landing barges were also lost.
Toen Maru	Imperial Japanese Navy	World War II: The fleet oiler struck a mine southwest of Hong Kong, losing her bow, and was beached. She was refloated, repaired and returned to service.

== 2 January ==
For the sinking of the Panamanian cargo ship Ruth Alexander, and the scuttling of the Swedish cargo ship Shantung on this day, see the entry for 25 December 1941.

List of shipwrecks: 2 January 1942
Ship	State	Description
Anakan	Philippines	World War II: The coaster was sunk in the Pasig River near Manila by Japanese aircraft. She was later salvaged by the Japanese and put into service as Anan Maru.
Bisayas	Philippines	World War II: The cargo ship was bombed and sunk at Manila by Japanese aircraft. She was later raised by the Japanese and put into service as Hishigata Maru.
USS Camia	United States Navy	World War II: The 681-class launch/yard ferry was bombed and sunk by Japanese aircraft at the Cavite Naval Base, Manila.
HMS Daisy	Royal Navy	The tug foundered in the Mediterranean Sea between Alexandria, Egypt and Tobruk, Libya.
USS Dapdap	United States Navy	World War II: The 681-class launch/yard ferry was lost to Japanese action at the Cavite Naval Base.
Don José	Philippines	World War II: The cargo ship was bombed and damaged in the Pacific Ocean by Japanese aircraft and was beached. She was captured by the Japanese, repaired and put into service as Dosai Maru.
F 151	Kriegsmarine	World War II: The Type A MFP landing craft was thrown by wind against the wreck of Wasserfloh (Germany) at Ras el Aali, Libya, wounding one of her crew. She was then sunk by a near-miss in a bombing attack that evening.
USS Iona	United States Navy	World War II: The yard tug was bombed and sunk at the Cavite Naval Base in a Japanese air raid.
Lanau	Philippines	World War II: The hospital ship was bombed and sunk off Cebu by Japanese aircraft.
Luzon	United States	World War II: The cargo ship was bombed and sunk, or scuttled, at Manila. She was later raised, repaired, and put into Japanese service as Ruson Maru.
USS Magdalena	United States Navy	World War II: The 681-class launch/yard ferry was bombed and sunk by Japanese aircraft, probably at Mariveles, Philippines.
USS Mercedes	United States Navy	World War II: The yard tug was burned to prevent capture at the Cavite Naval Base.
USS Rivera	United States Navy	World War II: The YFB-861-class yard ferry was scuttled at the Cavite Navy Yard to prevent capture.
USS Rosal	United States Navy	World War II: The 681-class launch/yard ferry was lost to Japanese forces.
USS Santa Rita	United States Navy	World War II: The YFB-861-class yard ferry was scuttled at the Cavite Navy Yard to prevent capture.
SKR-24 Aysberg	Soviet Navy	The guard ship was wrecked at Lumbovsky Island in a storm.
Waziristan	United Kingdom	World War II: Convoy PQ 7A: The cargo ship became stranded in ice. She was damaged by Luftwaffe bombing and then torpedoed and sunk by U-134 (Kriegsmarine) 20 nautical miles (37 km; 23 mi) south of Bear Island, Norway (74°09′N 19°10′E) with the loss of all 47 crew.
USS Yacal	United States Navy	World War II: The 681-class launch/yard ferrywas scuttled at the Cavite Navy Yard to prevent capture.
USS YO-64	United States Navy	World War II: The former tug was being converted into a self propelled oil barge when she was destroyed by Japanese action or scuttled.

== 3 January ==
For sinking of the British tanker Cardita, see the entry for 31 December, 1941.

List of shipwrecks: 3 January 1942
Ship	State	Description
Corfen	United Kingdom	World War II: The collier struck a mine and was damaged in the Thames Estuary. She was on a voyage from Middlesbrough, Yorkshire to London. She was taken in tow but later sank. A crewman died later of wounds. The rest of the crew survived.
Langkoeas	Netherlands	World War II: The cargo ship was torpedoed and sunk in the Java Sea north of Bawean, Netherlands East Indies by I-58 (Imperial Japanese Navy). Her crew took to the lifeboats, one of which was rammed by I-58. Other survivors were machine-gunned. Only three of her 94 crew survived. They were rescued by USS Paul Jones (United States Navy).
Meiko Maru	Imperial Japanese Navy	The troopship burned and sank when her cargo of gasoline caught fire off Hainan, China. All on board were rescued by Kashii (Imperial Japanese Navy).
Moji Maru	Imperial Japanese Navy	World War II: The Moji Maru-class tanker was sunk by a mine south west of Hong Kong.
Robert	United Kingdom	World War II: The cargo ship struck a mine and was damaged in the North Sea off Lowestoft, Suffolk (52°17′30″N 02°00′00″E). She was taken in tow but sank the next day.

== 4 January ==
List of shipwrecks: 4 January 1942
Ship	State	Description
Krasnyi Kavkaz	Soviet Navy	World War II: The Admiral Nakhimov-class cruiser was bombed and severely damaged off the Kerch Peninsula by Junkers Ju 87 aircraft of Sturzkampfgeschwader 77, Luftwaffe. Repairs took until October to complete.
Kwangtung	United Kingdom	World War II: The cargo ship was shelled and sunk in the Java Sea south of Java, Netherlands East Indies (9°12′S 111°10′E) by I-156 (Imperial Japanese Navy), which machine gunned and rammed the lifeboats. There were 35 survivors of the 136 people aboard.
Nuovo San Pietro	Regia Marina	World War II: The auxiliary minesweeper, a caïque, was sunk by gunfire in the Ionian Sea west of Cephalonia, Greece (38°07′N 20°20′E) by HMS Thunderbolt (Royal Navy). There were one dead, two wounded and two uninjured survivors.
SKA-058	Soviet Navy	World War II: The MO-4-class patrol vessel was sunk at Feodosia by Luftwaffe aircraft.
Zyryanin	Soviet Navy	World War II: The transport ship was bombed and sunk at Feodosia by Luftwaffe aircraft. A crewman was killed.

== 5 January ==
List of shipwrecks: 5 January 1942
Ship	State	Description
Ammiraglio Saint-Bon	Regia Marina	World War II: The submarine was torpedoed and sunk in the Mediterranean Sea (38°22′N 15°22′E) by HMS Upholder (Royal Navy) with the loss of 57 of her 60 crew.
Città di Palermo	Italy	World War II: The troopship was torpedoed and sunk in the Adriatic Sea 3 nautical miles (5.6 km) west of Cape Dukato, Albania by HMS Proteus (Royal Navy). There were between 400 and 600 dead, and 291 survivors.
Cornelia Maersk	Denmark	World War II: The cargo ship was bombed and sunk at Hook of Holland, South Holland, Netherlands during a British air raid. Her crew survived.
Nogin	Soviet Union	World War II: The cargo ship was sunk at Feodosia by Luftwaffe aircraft. There were no casualties.
TKA-91	Soviet Navy	World War II: The G-5-class motor torpedo boat was sunk by Luftwaffe aircraft off Eupatoria. At least six people were killed. There were no survivors.
Vrzyvatel T-405	Soviet Navy	World War II: The Project 53-class minesweeper was damaged by Luftwaffe aircraft and later ran aground at Eupatoria. She was destroyed next day by German field artillery. Five of her 25 crew were killed. Nineteen survivors were captured (two later died of their wounds), and one escaped.

== 6 January ==
List of shipwrecks: 6 January 1942
Ship	State	Description
Baron Erskine	United Kingdom	World War II: Convoy SC 62: The cargo ship straggled behind the convoy. She was torpedoed and sunk in the Atlantic Ocean (57°27′N 32°36′W) by U-701 (Kriegsmarine) with the loss of all 41 crew. A report from U-701 stated there were 34 survivors, but none were seen again.
CKA-131	Soviet Navy	The MO-4-class patrol vessel was sunk at Feodosiya in an air raid by Luftwaffe aircraft.
Norwich Trader	United Kingdom	The coaster struck a mine, exploded and sank in the North Sea (51°55′07″N 1°32′05″E) with the loss of all six crew and a gunner.

== 7 January ==
List of shipwrecks: 7 January 1942
Ship	State	Description
Jumièges	France	The cargo liner issued a mayday in the Mediterranean Sea off the Balearic Islands, Spain during a storm. No further trace was found of her and her twenty crew.
No. 111	Soviet Navy	The G-5-class motor torpedo boat was lost on this date.
Perla	Italy	World War II: The cargo ship was torpedoed and sunk in the Mediterranean Sea 20 nautical miles (37 km) south of Pantelleria by Fairey Swordfish aircraft of 830 Squadron, Fleet Air Arm. Her 78 crew survived.
HNLMS TAN 3	Royal Netherlands Navy	World War II: The auxiliary tanker was torpedoed, shelled and sunk in the Bali Sea south east of Kangean Island (07°15′S 116°23′E) by I-57 (Imperial Japanese Navy). Her crew were rescued by aircraft the next day.
Unkai Maru No.1	Imperial Japanese Navy	World War II: The Unkai Maru No.1-class auxiliary collier was torpedoed and severely damaged in the Pacific Ocean off Miko (34°27′N 138°59′E) by USS Pollack (United States Navy). A crew member was killed, 53 were rescued by Meiten Maru (Imperial Japanese Navy). The drifting wreck was sunk by a Japanese aircraft four days later.
V 5104 Orkan	Kriegsmarine	World War II: Operation Kitbag: The submarine chaser was shelled and damaged by HMS Inglefield and HMS Intrepid (both Royal Navy) and was beached at Florø, Norway.

== 8 January ==
List of shipwrecks: 8 January 1942
Ship	State	Description
Chapaev	Soviet Union	World War II: The cargo ship was attacked and sunk at Feodosia by Luftwaffe aircraft.
USAMP General Richard Arnold	United States Army	World War II: The United States Army mine planter sprang a leak in a storm and sank 20 miles (32 km) south east of the Isles of Shoals. Ten of her crew were killed. Her commanding officer was rescued by USAMP L-88 (United States Army).
Tornator	Finland	The cargo ship was wrecked at Omaezaki, Japan.
Van Rees	Netherlands	World War II: The cargo ship was torpedoed and sunk in the Java Sea 80 nautical miles (150 km) south of Tjilatjap, Netherlands East Indies (7°53′S 106°11′E) by I-56 (Imperial Japanese Navy). Six of her crew were killed.
Van Riebeeck	Netherlands	World War II: The cargo ship was shelled and sunk in the Indian Ocean (8°11′S 108°47′E) by I-56 (Imperial Japanese Navy). Thirteen of her crew were killed. Survivors were rescued by HNLMS Willem van der Zaan (Royal Netherlands Navy).

== 9 January ==
List of shipwrecks: 9 January 1942
Ship	State	Description
Annie M. Rolf	United States	The fishing barge was wrecked off Long Beach, California.
Benkoelen	Netherlands	World War II: The cargo ship was torpedoed and sunk in the Java Sea (4°50′S 112°20′E) by I-65 (Imperial Japanese Navy). Three of her crew were killed. USS Paul Jones (United States Navy) rescued the survivors the next day.
Camphuijs	Netherlands	World War II: The cargo ship was shelled, then torpedoed and sunk in the Java Sea west of Bawean Island, Netherlands East Indies (4°40′S 111°47′E) by I-58 (Imperial Japanese Navy).
Chatyr Dag	Soviet Navy	World War II: The transport ship was bombed and sunk at Feodosia by Luftwaffe aircraft.
Lamoricière	France	World War II: The ocean liner foundered in the Mediterranean Sea 3 nautical miles (5.6 km) north of Menorca, Spain during a violent storm with the loss of her captain and 291 of the 394 people aboard, while trying to help locate Jumièges (France).
Laura	Denmark	The fishing vessel was destroyed by an explosion in the Baltic Sea.
Poul Carl	Denmark	The cargo ship was rammed and sunk in the Øresund. Her crew survived.<
Spartakovets	Soviet Navy	World War II: The transport ship was bombed and sunk at Feodosia by Luftwaffe aircraft.
Teian Maru	Japan	World War II: The government-owned cargo ship was torpedoed and sunk in the Pacific Ocean (35°00′N 140°36′E) by USS Pollack (United States Navy) with the loss of nine of her crew.
Tunisian	(France) Tunisia	The cargo ship ran aground and was wrecked at Ke et Haman on 9 or 11 January.
HMS Vimiera	Royal Navy	World War II: Convoy FS 693: The V-class destroyer struck a mine and sank in the Thames Estuary with the loss of 96 of her 110 crew.

== 10 January ==
List of shipwrecks: 10 January 1942
Ship	State	Description
Akita Maru	Imperial Japanese Army	World War II: The Akita Maru-class auxiliary transport was torpedoed and damaged in the South China Sea at the mouth of the Gulf of Siam (07°35′N 103°13′E) by HNLMS O 19 (Royal Netherlands Navy) with the loss of four of her crew. Survivors were rescued by Asakazi, Fubuki, and Hatakaze (all Imperial Japanese Navy). Akita Maru was scuttled by Fubuki, sinking in 253 feet (77 m) of water.
Borderdene	United Kingdom	World War II: The coaster struck a mine and sank in the Bristol Channel off Brean Down, Somerset with the loss of all four of her crew.
C. J. Barkdull	Panama	World War II: Convoy UGS 3: The cargo ship stragged behind the convoy. She was torpedoed and sunk in the Atlantic Ocean west of Ireland by U-632 (Kriegsmarine).
Continent	Canada	The 466-gross register ton coaster was rammed in foggy weather by the tanker Byron D. Benson (United States) and sank off the coast of New Jersey, United States (40°25.662′N 073°50.736′W) with a loss of one of her fourteen crew. Continent was on a voyage from New York, United States to a port in the Dominion of Newfoundland.
Daylite	Panama	World War II: The cargo ship struck a mine laid by I-124 (Imperial Japanese Navy) and sank in Manila Bay off Corregidor Island, Philippines. She was raised by the Japanese in 1943 and renamed Gyoshin Maru.
Elise Schulte	Germany	The cargo ship ran aground near Tromsø, Norway and sank the next day. Her crew were rescued.
Fedora	Italy	World War II: The cargo ship was torpedoed and sunk in the Adriatic Sea 35 nautical miles (65 km) south east of Cape Dukato, Albania (38°59′N 19°59′E) by HMS Thrasher (Royal Navy). Her 36 crew were rescued.
Harbin Maru	Imperial Japanese Army	World War II: The Harbin Maru-class auxiliary transport ship was torpedoed and sunk in the South China Sea 40 miles (64 km) south of Hainan, China (17°40′N 109°20′E) by USS Stingray (United States Navy). Two passengers and four of her crew were killed.
Kanko Maru	Imperial Japanese Navy	World War II: The auxiliary gunboat was torpedoed and sunk in the South China Sea by USS Pickerel (United States Navy).
L-6	Soviet Navy	The Leninets-class submarine ran aground in the Black Sea off Cape Doob. She was on a voyage from Novorossiysk to Poti. She was refloated the next day and towed in to Poti. Repairs took a year to complete.
M-175	Soviet Navy	World War II: The M-class submarine was torpedoed and sunk in the Barents Sea (70°09′N 32°50′E by U-584 (Kriegsmarine) with the loss of all 21 crew.
Mimona	Norway	World War II: The cargo ship grounded near the Kjølnes Lighthouse, Norway (70°49′N 29°20′E). On 19 January, K-22 (Soviet Navy) attacked the grounded ship with torpedoes and gunfire and set her ablaze. She was a total loss. There were no casualties.
HMS Queen of Bermuda	Royal Navy	The armed merchant cruiser ran aground at Halifax, Nova Scotia, Canada and was severely damaged. She was refloated the next day, repaired and returned to service.
Tairyu Maru	Japan	World War II: The cargo ship was torpedoed and sunk in the South China Sea at the mouth of the Gulf of Siam (07°35′N 103°13′E) by HNLMS O 19 (Royal Netherlands Navy).
HNLMS Van Masdijn	Royal Netherlands Navy	World War II: The patrol boat was sunk by a Japanese flying boat off Tarakan Island Netherlands East Indies with the loss of ten of her 55 crew.

== 11 January ==
For sinking of the American tanker Manatawny on this date, see the entry for 12 December 1941.

List of shipwrecks: 11 January 1942
Ship	State	Description
City of Pittsburgh	United Kingdom	The cargo ship ran aground at Alexandria, Egypt and broke her back, a total loss.
USAT Clevedon	United States Army	The cargo ship suffered an engine room fire at the Army pier at Yakutat, Territory of Alaska. She was towed to sea where she sank about one mile (1.6 km) offshore without casualties.
USAT Liberty	United States Army	World War II: The cargo ship was torpedoed and damaged in the Lombok Strait (8°54′S 115°28′E) by I-166 (Imperial Japanese Navy). She was taken in tow by USS Paul Jones (United States Navy) and HNLMS Van Ghent (Royal Netherlands Navy) and beached at Tulamben, Netherlands East Indies. There were no casualties. She remained there for 21 years but sank in 1963 following the eruption of Mount Agung.
HNLMS Prins van Oranje	Royal Netherlands Navy	World War II: The Prins van Oranje-class minelayer was shelled and sunk off Tarakan Island, Netherlands East Indies by the destroyer Yamakaze and patrol vessel Patrol Boat 38 (both Imperial Japanese Navy). Only sixteen of her 118 crew were rescued.
R 42	Kriegsmarine	The minesweeper struck a submerged wreck and sank in the English Channel off Ambleteuse, Pas-de-Calais, France.
Wulin	United Kingdom	World War II: The cargo ship was bombed and sunk in the Muar River, Malaya by Japanese aircraft. A crew member was killed. She was later salvaged and entered Japanese service as Unryu Maru.

== 12 January ==
List of shipwrecks: 12 January 1942
Ship	State	Description
Caledonian Monarch	United Kingdom	World War II: Convoy SC 63: The cargo ship was torpedoed and sunk in the Atlantic Ocean by U-333 (Kriegsmarine) with the loss of 41 lives.
Cyclops	United Kingdom	World War II: Operation Paukenschlag: The cargo ship was torpedoed and sunk in the Atlantic Ocean (41°51′N 63°48′W) by U-123 (Kriegsmarine) with the loss of 87 of the 182 people aboard. Survivors were rescued by HMCS Red Deer (Royal Canadian Navy).
Empire Parsons	United Kingdom	The cargo ship ran aground at Stroma, in the Pentland Firth (58°41′N 3°06′W). Her 52 crew were rescued by the Stroma Lifesaving Association using a breeches buoy. The ship was driven further ashore and rapidly became a total loss.
Frisco	Norway	World War II: The cargo ship was torpedoed and sunk in the Atlantic Ocean off Canso, Nova Scotia, Canada (44°50′N 60°20′W) by U-130 (Kriegsmarine) with the loss of thirteen of her nineteen crew. Survivors were rescued by Mjoanes (Faroe Islands).
Quickstep	United Kingdom	World War II: The cargo ship struck a mine and sank in the North Sea (51°46′N 1°26′E) with the loss of twelve of her 28 crew.
Toboali	Netherlands	World War II: The coaster was bombed and sunk at Bagan Siapi, Netherlands East Indies by Japanese aircraft. In 1944 she was salvaged, repaired and entered Japanese service as Aki Maru.
Turkheim	Kriegsmarine	World War II: The cargo ship was torpedoed and sunk off the coast of Norway by the S-102 (Soviet Navy).
U-374	Kriegsmarine	World War II: The Type VIIC submarine was torpedoed and sunk in the Mediterranean Sea east of Cape Spartivento, Italy (37°50′N 16°00′E) by HMS Unbeaten (Royal Navy) with the loss of 42 of her 43 crew.
W-13, and W-14	Imperial Japanese Navy	World War II: The W-13-class minesweepers were sunk by Dutch 4.7-inch shore batteries off Tarakan Island, Netherlands East Indies. From their crews there were 157 dead and 53 survivors. In reprisal, the Japanese executed 215 men of the gun crews on 18 January.
Yngaren	Sweden	World War II: Convoy HX 168: The cargo ship straggled behind the convoy. She was torpedoed and sunk in the Atlantic Ocean (approximately 57°N 26°W) by U-43 (Kriegsmarine) with the loss of 38 of her 40 crew. Survivors were rescued by a British fishing trawler.

== 13 January ==
List of shipwrecks: 13 January 1942
Ship	State	Description
Brazos	United States	The cargo ship collided with HMS Archer (Royal Navy) off Charleston, South Carolina, United States. Brazos sank the next day as a result of damage sustained. Her 35 crew were rescued by HMS Archer.
Empire Masefield	United Kingdom	World War II: The cargo ship was bombed and severely damaged in the North Sea (54°22′N 0°19′W) by Luftwaffe aircraft and was beached at Middlesbrough, Yorkshire. One gunner was killed. She was refloated the next day with the assistance of five tugs, which included Acklam Cross, Euston Cross and Lingdale (all (United Kingdom). Empire Masefield was repaired and returned to service.
Friar Rock	Panama	World War II: Convoy SC 64: The cargo ship straggled behind the convoy. She was torpedoed and sunk in the Atlantic Ocean 100 nautical miles (190 km) south east of Cape Race, Newfoundland (45°30′N 50°40′W) by U-130 (Kriegsmarine). with the loss of 31 of her 37 crew. Survivors were rescued by HMS Montgomery (Royal Navy).
Lerwick	United Kingdom	World War II: The cargo ship was bombed and sunk in the North Sea (54°26′N 0°24′W) by Luftwaffe aircraft with the loss of five of her 44 crew.

== 14 January ==
List of shipwrecks: 14 January 1942
Ship	State	Description
Acklam Cross, and Euston Cross	United Kingdom	The tugs ran aground on the North Gar Sands, off the mouth of the River Tees whilst attempting to refloat Empire Masefield (United Kingdom). They were both refloated.
Bataysk	Soviet Union	World War II: The cargo ship was bombed and sunk by Luftwaffe aircraft in the port of Kerch with the loss of three lives.
Chepo	Panama	World War II: Convoy ON 55: The cargo ship was torpedoed and sunk in the Atlantic Ocean 230 nautical miles (430 km) west of Rockall, Inverness-shire, United Kingdom (58°30′N 19°40′W) by U-43 (Kriegsmarine) with the loss of seventeen of her 38 crew. Survivors were rescued by HMS Sunflower (Royal Navy).
Dupoco II	United States	The motorboat was destroyed by fire at Juneau, Territory of Alaska.
Empire Surf	United Kingdom	World War II: Convoy ON 55: The cargo ship was torpedoed and sunk in the Atlantic Ocean south east of the Faroe Islands (58°42′N 19°16′W) by U-43 (Kriegsmarine) with the loss of 47 of her 53 crew. Survivors were rescued by HMS Alisma (Royal Navy).
Falavee	United Kingdom	The cargo ship ran aground and was wrecked off the entrance to Carlingford Lough.
Mercia	United Kingdom	World War II: The tug struck a mine and sank in the Bristol Channel (51°31′21″N 2°46′44″W) with the loss of all four hands.
Norness	Panama	World War II: Carrying a cargo of fuel oil, the tanker was torpedoed and sunk in 284 feet (87 m) of water in the Atlantic Ocean 60 nautical miles (110 km; 69 mi) southeast of Block Island off the coast of Rhode Island, United States at either 40°28′N 70°50′W or 40°26′25″N 070°51′00″W (according to different sources) by the submarine U-123 (Kriegsmarine) with the loss of either one of her 31 crew or two of her 40 crew (according to different sources). She was the first ship sunk by a German submarine off the United States East Coast during World War II. Survivors were rescued by the cutter USCGC Argo ( United States Coast Guard), the destroyer USS Ellyson (United States Navy), and the fishing vessel Malvina (United States).
TKA-44	Soviet Navy	The G-5-class motor torpedo boat was wrecked after being thrown ashore by a storm while being towed to Novorossiysk.
Turkheim	Germany	World War II: The cargo ship (1,904 GRT) was torpedoed and sunk in the Syltefjorden by S-102 (Soviet Navy). Two crew were killed.
11 V 1	Kriegsmarine	World War II: The 259 GRT Vorpostenboot, former Greek Navy water lighter Palaskas, struck a mine laid on 11 January by HMS Porpoise (Royal Navy) and sank in Suda Bay, Crete (35°34′N 24°11′E). Out of her crew, 3 men were killed and 18 wounded.

== 15 January ==
List of shipwrecks: 15 January 1942
Ship	State	Description
Begochu	Spain	The cargo ship ran aground and was wrecked outside of Leixoes, Portugal.
Catalina	Portugal	World War II:fishing trawler, a former Kil-class gunboat, was torpedoed and sunk in the Atlantic Ocean (approximately 47°N 52°W) by U-203 (Kriegsmarine) with the loss of all eighteen hands.
Coimbra	United Kingdom	World War II: The tanker was torpedoed and sunk in the Atlantic Ocean (40°25′N 72°21′W) by U-123 (Kriegsmarine) in 190 feet (58 m) of water with the loss of 36 of her 46 crew. Survivors were rescued by USS Rowan and another destroyer (both United States Navy).
Coyhaique	Chile	The cargo ship was wrecked at Puerto Aysen.
Dayrose	United Kingdom	World War II: The cargo ship was torpedoed and sunk in the Atlantic Ocean (46°32′N 53°00′W) off the coast of the Dominion of Newfoundland by U-552 (Kriegsmarine) with the loss of 38 of her 48 crew. Survivors were rescued by USS Ericsson and USS Stack (both United States Navy).
Diala	United Kingdom	World War II: The tanker was torpedoed and damaged in the Atlantic Ocean 300 nautical miles (560 km) east south east of Cape Race, Dominion of Newfoundland (44°50′N 46°50′W) by U-553 (Kriegsmarine) with the loss of 57 of her 65 crew. Survivors abandoned ship on 20 January and were rescued by Telesfora de Larrinaga (United Kingdom). On 22 January, the wreck was boarded by eight survivors from Athelcrown (United Kingdom). They were rescued on 28 January by Saturnus (Sweden). Diala was discovered still afloat on 21 February and an attempt was made to take her in tow by a Royal Navy ship. The tow parted on 26 February and she was again left adrift. She was torpedoed and sunk on 23 March by U-587 (Kriegsmarine).
Empire Bay	United Kingdom	World War II: The collier was bombed and sunk in the North Sea off Middlesbrough, Yorkshire (54°41′08″N 1°08′36″W) by Luftwaffe aircraft. She was on a voyage from Hartlepool, County Durham to London.
Empire Homer	United Kingdom	The cargo ship ran aground on Sandray, Outer Hebrides and broke in two, a total loss.
F 148	Kriegsmarine	World War II: The MFP-A landing craft was sunk by an explosion off Tripoli, Libya. Her fourteen crew were rescued, twelve of them were wounded.
Gorecht	Netherlands	World War II: The cargo ship struck a mine and sank three nautical miles (5.6 km; 3.5 mi) west of Burnham Lighthouse, Somerset, United Kingdom. Seven of her crew were killed.
IV II	Kriegsmarine	World War II: The auxiliary minesweeper struck a mine and sank in Suda Bay.
Jalarajan	India	World War II: The cargo ship was torpedoed and sunk in the Indian Ocean (0°12′S 97°00′E) by I-65 (Imperial Japanese Navy) with the loss of four of her 78 crew.
Laristan	United Kingdom	The tanker ran aground on Tiree, Inner Hebrides. She was refloated but declared a constructive total loss. She was later repaired and returned to service as Empire Gulf.
Nordale	United Kingdom	The 109-foot (33 m), 181-ton fishing trawler struck the Carskey Rocks on tip of Kintyre two miles (3.2 km) south west of Borgadelmore Point, in the Mull of Kintyre, Argyllshire and was wrecked with the loss of five of her fourteen crew.
Ocean Tide	United Kingdom	The 117.1-foot (35.7 m), 227-ton fishing trawler ran aground and was wrecked at Mammal, Tiree, Inner Hebrides (49°56′N 07°55′W), a total loss.
Quickthorn	United Kingdom	The cargo ship capsized and sank in heavy weather near Skokholm Island, off Milford Haven, Pembrokeshire.
R. J. Cullen	Canada	The cargo ship ran aground on Leanish Point, Barra, Outer Hebrides (56°57′23″N 7°25′18″W) in a gale. Her crew were rescued by St. Margaret (United Kingdom) on 17 January.
U-93	Kriegsmarine	World War II: The Type VIIC submarine was shelled, rammed and sunk in the Atlantic Ocean north east of Madeira, Portugal (36°10′N 15°25′W) by HMS Hesperus (Royal Navy) with the loss of six of her 46 crew. Survivors were taken as prisoners of war.
U-577	Kriegsmarine	World War II: The Type VIIC submarine was depth charged and sunk in the Mediterranean Sea north west of Mersa Matruh, Egypt (32°40′N 25°48′E) by Fairey Swordfish aircraft of 815 Squadron, Fleet Air Arm with the loss of all 43 crew.
Vestland	Norway	The cargo ship ran aground at Hvalfjord, Iceland and was damaged. She was refloated on 16 March and towed to Reykjavík. Departed under tow on 21 October for repairs at a Tyneside shipyard, but foundered in the Atlantic Ocean (50°15′N 11°30′W) on 24 October.

== 16 January ==
List of shipwrecks: 16 January 1942
Ship	State	Description
Empire Chief	United Kingdom	The tanker ran aground off Reykjavík, Iceland. She was refloated in March 1942, repaired and returned to service.
HS-1	Kriegsmarine	World War II: The tug was sunk by aircraft off Rouen, Seine-Inférieure, France.
HMT Irvana	Royal Navy	World War II: The Castle-class minesweeping naval trawler was sunk in the North Sea off Great Yarmouth, Norfolk (52°31′N 01°46′E) by German Junkers Ju 88 aircraft. One aircraft was shot down and the four crew were captured. Irvana's crew were rescued.
Jean Jaures	Soviet Union	World War II: The cargo ship was sunk by a mine in the Gulf of Feodosia with the loss of 40 lives.
Senang	Netherlands	World War II: The cargo ship struck a mine and sank off Singapore (1°15′N 104°05′E) with the loss of 54 of her 93 crew.
Taishu Maru	Japan	The cargo ship ran aground and was wrecked off Okushiri Island, Hokkaido.
Wigry	Poland	The cargo ship suffered a boiler explosion in a gale, the gale drove her onto rocks off the south west coast of Iceland with the loss of 25 of her 27 crew.

== 17 January ==
List of shipwrecks: 17 January 1942
Ship	State	Description
Enisej	Soviet Navy	World War II: Convoy PQ 8: The naval trawler was torpedoed and damaged in the Arctic Sea (68°41′N 38°58′E) by U-454 (Kriegsmarine). The ship broke in two, with the bow section sinking. There were two dead and 32 survivors.
Fukusei Maru	Japan	The cargo ship ran aground and was wrecked off the Yangtze River Estuary.
HMS Gurkha	Royal Navy	World War II: Convoy MW 8B: The L-class destroyer was torpedoed and damaged in the Mediterranean Sea off Sidi Barrani, Egypt (31°50′N 26°15′E) by U-133 (Kriegsmarine) with the loss of nine of her 282 crew. She was taken in tow by HNLMS Isaac Sweers (Royal Netherlands Navy) but later sank. HNLMS Isaac Sweers rescued the survivors.
I-60	Imperial Japanese Navy	World War II: The Kaidai IIIa/b type submarine was depth charged and forced to the surface and sunk in the Sunda Strait off Krakatoa, Netherlands East Indies (6°19′30″S 104°49′20″E) in a running gun battle with HMS Jupiter (Royal Navy) with the loss of 84 of her crew. Only three men were rescued and taken prisoner of war, one of whom later died.
Kolkhoznik	Soviet Union	The cargo ship ran aground and was wrecked off the Sambro Island Lighthouse, Nova Scotia, Canada with the loss of two lives.
HMS Matabele	Royal Navy	World War II: Convoy PQ 8: The Tribal-class destroyer was torpedoed and sunk in the Arctic Ocean (69°21′N 35°34′E) by U-454 (Kriegsmarine) with the loss of 236 of her 238 crew.
HMS MTB 47	Royal Navy	World War II: The White 73-foot-class motor torpedo boat was sunk by enemy action in the English Channel off Cap Gris Nez, Pas-de-Calais, France. Her crew were taken as prisoners of war.
RFA Nyholt	Royal Fleet Auxiliary	World War II: The tanker was torpedoed, shelled and sunk in the Atlantic Ocean off the coast of the Dominion of Newfoundland (45°46′N 54°18′W) by U-87 (Kriegsmarine) with the loss of twenty of the 40 people aboard. Survivors were rescued by HMCS St. Clair (Royal Canadian Navy).
Octavian	Norway	World War II: The cargo ship was torpedoed and sunk in the Atlantic Ocean 37°57′N 74°22′W by U-123 (Kriegsmarine) with the loss of all seventeen crew.
Rampino	Italy	World War II: The 130-foot (40 m), 270-ton salvage ship was torpedoed and sunk in the Mediterranean Sea off Pantelleria (35°59′N 10°45′E) by HMS Umbra (Royal Navy) with the loss of fourteen of her fifteen crew. The survivor was rescued by HMS Umbra.
San José	United States	The cargo ship was sunk in the Atlantic Ocean (39°15′N 74°09′W) in a collision with Santa Elisa (United States). Her crew were rescued. Santa Elisa was towed to New York and repaired.

== 18 January ==
List of shipwrecks: 18 January 1942
Ship	State	Description
Allan Jackson	United States	World War II: The tanker was torpedoed and sunk in the Atlantic Ocean (35°37′N 74°20′W by U-66 (Kriegsmarine) with the loss of 22 of her 35 crew. Survivors were rescued by USS Roe (United States Navy).
Charlwood	United Kingdom	World War II: Convoy FN 886: The cargo ship collided with Lyng (Norway) and sank in the North Sea off the mouth of the River Tyne.
Città di Livorno	Italy	World War II: The cargo ship was sunk in the Mediterranean Sea north of Crete, Greece (35°42′N 24°24′E) by HMS Porpoise (Royal Navy). There were eight dead and 464 survivors.
Dimitrios G. Thermiotis	Greece	World War II: Convoy SC 53: The cargo ship straggled behind the convoy. She was torpedoed and sunk in the Atlantic Ocean (47°30′N 52°20′W) by U-86 (Kriegsmarine) with the loss of all 33 crew.
Eizan Maru	Japan	World War II: The cargo ship was torpedoed and sunk in the Kii Channel (30°00′N 135°00′E) by USS Plunger (United States Navy).
Empire Kingfisher	United Kingdom	The cargo ship struck a submerged object 4 nautical miles (7.4 km) off Cape Sable Island, Nova Scotia, Canada and was holed. She sank the next day. There were no casualties.
HMT Erin	Royal Navy	World War II: The naval trawler was sunk at Gibraltar by a bomb planted by a Spanish agent of the Abwehr. Four men were killed.
Frances Salman	United States	World War II: The Design 1099 ship was torpedoed and sunk in the Atlantic Ocean off Cape Race, Dominion of Newfoundland (46°33′N 53°05′W), by U-552 (Kriegsmarine) with the loss of all 28 crew.
Hai-Kan No. 6	Imperial Japanese Navy	The decommissioned Kasuga-class armored cruiser was sunk as a gunnery target in the Inland Sea of Japan off Kurahashi, Hiroshima, by the battleship Yamato (Imperial Japanese Navy).
HMT Honjo	Royal Navy	World War II: The 129.3-foot (39.4 m), 308-ton naval trawler burned and sank at Gibraltar by the explosion of a bomb planted on HMT Erin (Royal Navy) by a Spanish agent of the Abwehr. She was never repaired. Two of her crew were killed.
Luzon	Philippines	World War II: The United States Army-requisitioned cargo ship was bombed and strafed by Japanese aircraft at Cebu City and was beached to prevent sinking. She was declared a constructive total loss. She was later salvaged and put in Japanese service as Luzon Maru.

== 19 January ==
List of shipwrecks: 19 January 1942
Ship	State	Description
Cape Sable	United Kingdom	The cargo ship sank south of the Bantam Rocks.
Ciltvaira	Latvia	World War II: The cargo ship was torpedoed and damaged in the Atlantic Ocean off the east coast of the United States (35°25′N 75°23′W) by U-123 (Kriegsmarine) with the loss of two of her 31 crew. Survivors were rescued by Socony-Vacuum (United States). Nine of her crew later reboarded her and she was taken in tow by Bury ( Brazil) but the tow was later abandoned and the skeleton crew were taken aboard Bury. Ciltvaira was then taken in tow by USS Sciota (United States Navy) but later foundered at 34°58′N 75°10′W. More: Latvian Mercantile Marine during World War II
City of Atlanta	United States	World War II: The cargo ship was torpedoed and sunk in the Atlantic Ocean off the east coast of the United States (35°42′N 75°21′W) by U-123 (Kriegsmarine) with the loss of 44 of her 47 crew. Survivors were rescued by the train ferry Seatrain Texas (United States).
Eugenie S. Embiricos	Greece	The cargo ship ran aground at Leanish Point, Barra, Outer Hebrides, United Kingdom (56°57′N 7°25′W) and sank. There were no casualties.
Floristan	United Kingdom	World War II: Convoy OS 17: The cargo ship was wrecked in a gale and rain six miles (9.7 km) north of the Orsay Lighthouse at Kilchiaran Bay (55°48′08″N 6°28′15″W). She broke in two the next day and was declared a total loss. All on board made it to shore in her lifeboats.
H. K. Daniels	United Kingdom	World War II: The steamboat, or sailing bargE, struck a mine and sank in the North Sea (51°28′12″N 0°52′42″E). Both crew were rescued.
Ingrid	Norway	Convoy ON 57: The cargo ship ran aground and was wrecked at Grean, Tiree, Outer Hebrides (56°32′04″N 6°56′00″W) in heavy weather. Her 26 crew all survived.
RMS Lady Hawkins	Canada	World War II: The ocean liner was torpedoed and sunk between Cape Hatteras, North Carolina, United States and Bermuda (35°00′N 72°30′W) by U-66 (Kriegsmarine) with the loss of 251 of the 322 people aboard. Survivors were rescued by USAT Coamo (United States) on 27 January.
Mobeka	Belgium	World War II: Convoy OS 17: The cargo ship ran aground at Carskey Point, Mull of Kintyre, Argyllshire, United Kingdom (55°13′N 6°02′W). Salvage was abandoned in April 1942 and she was declared a total loss.
Norvana	United States	World War II: The cargo ship was torpedoed and sunk in the Atlantic Ocean north of Cape Hatteras (36°07′N 75°23′W), by U-123 (Kriegsmarine) with the loss of all 29 crew.
USS PT-31	United States Navy	World War II: The ELCO 77'-class PT boat ran aground in Subic Bay (14°45′N 120°13′E) and was scuttled by burning the next day.
HMT Rosemonde	Royal Navy	World War II: The naval trawler was torpedoed and sunk in the Atlantic Ocean north east of the Azores, Portugal by U-581 (Kriegsmarine) with the loss of all 25 crew.
San Giovanni Battista	Italy	World War II: The ship was torpedoed and damaged in the Mediterranean Sea (33°47′N 12°17′E) by British aircraft. She was taken in tow, but came ashore 2 nautical miles (3.7 km) west of Tagiura, Libya on 2 February after the towline broke. She was refloated and towed in to Tripoli, Libya.
Sørøy	Norway	World War II: The coaster was torpedoed and sunk in the Norwegian Sea off the Sværholt Peninsula by K-23 (Soviet Navy) with the loss of two of her crew.
Thermopylæ	Norway	World War II: Convoy MW 8A: The troopship was bombed and damaged in the Mediterranean Sea (34°03′N 24°14′E) by a Junkers Ju 88 aircraft of the Luftwaffe with the loss of 33 of the 374 people aboard. Survivors were rescued by HMS Havock (Royal Navy), which scuttled Thermopylæ.
Vaaland	Norway	World War II: The fishing cutter was shelled and sunk off Berlevåg by K-22 (Soviet Navy) with the loss of a crew member.
Van Imhoff	Netherlands	World War II: The cargo ship (2,980 GRT) was bombed and sunk in the Indian Ocean south of Java, Netherlands East Indies by Imperial Japanese Navy aircraft. The ship was carrying 477 German civilian internees, who, forced at gunpoint to remain on the ship, perished almost completely. The whole crew and the guards all survived with lifeboats, taking with them only one German who was rescued after being fired at while swimming towards them. The other internees were intentionally denied rescue and assistance by the Dutch and 409 drowned when the ship capsized or died at exposure in the rafts around it; only 67 managed to reach nearby islands with the two damaged boat left behind by the crew, two of them dying on Nias Island.

== 20 January ==
List of shipwrecks: 20 January 1942
Ship	State	Description
Amathus	United Kingdom	The cargo ship ran aground and was wrecked at the entrance to Lattakia harbour, Levant States.
Banshu Maru No. 52	Imperial Japanese Navy	World War II: The auxiliary minesweeper was sunk by mines in Subic Bay (14°45′N 120°17′E). Survivors were rescued by Aso Maru, Nampo Maru, and Kiso Maru (all Imperial Japanese Navy).
Eidsvold	Norway	World War II: The cargo ship was torpedoed and sunk in the Indian Ocean at Flying Fish Cove, Christmas Island, Australia by I-59 (Imperial Japanese Navy). Her crew were rescued.
Herstein	Norway	World War II: Battle of Rabaul: The cargo ship was bombed and sunk at Rabaul, Papua New Guinea by Japanese aircraft with the loss of a crew member.
I-124	Imperial Japanese Navy	World War II: The I-121-class submarine was depth charged and sunk in the Beagle Gulf 40 miles (64 km) west of Darwin, Northern Territory, Australia (12°7′S 130°06′E) by HMAS Deloraine (Royal Australian Navy) with the loss of 80 of her crew.
Karanan	Netherlands	The coastal cargo ship was sunk in the Belfast Lough in a collision with British Engineer (United Kingdom).
Markkyn	United Kingdom	The cargo ship (3,229 GRT, 1918) ran aground at Port Logan, Wigtownshire. She was refloated on 5 June, repaired and re-entered service as Empire Usk.
Maro	Greece	World War II: Convoy ON 53: The cargo ship straggled behind the convoy. She was shelled and sunk in the Atlantic Ocean by U-552 (Kriegsmarine) with the loss of all 29 hands.
USS S-36	United States Navy	World War II: The S-class submarine ran aground on the Taka Bakang Reef in the Makassar Strait, Netherlands East Indies. She was scuttled due to damage sustained and to prevent capture by enemy forces. Her crew were rescued by the motor launch Attla (Netherlands).
Tobelo	Netherlands	The cargo liner was bombed and sunk at Kupang, Dutch Timor. She was later raised and repaired and put in Japanese service as Tobi Maru.
Westralia	Australia	World War II: Battle of Rabaul: The coal hulk was bombed and sunk by Japanese aircraft at Simpson Harbour, New Britain.
William Hanbury	United Kingdom	The 115.4-foot (35.2 m), 204.1-ton trawler was wrecked in a gale on St. Ann's Head, Isle of Man, a total loss. The crew taken off by the Port St. Mary lifeboat Sir Heath Harrison. Her captain died of a heart attack after being landed at Castletown, Isle of Man about five hours after the wreck occurred.

== 21 January ==
List of shipwrecks: 21 January 1942
Ship	State	Description
Alexandra Høegh	Norway	World War II: The tanker was torpedoed and sunk in the Atlantic Ocean south of Nova Scotia, Canada (40°53′N 65°56′W) by U-130 (Kriegsmarine). Her 28 crew were rescued by the fishing trawler Grand Marshall (United States).
Asiatic	United Kingdom	The cargo ship ran aground at Tara, County Down and was abandoned. She was refloated on 2 April but declared a constructive total loss. Asiatic was repaired and re-entered service in 1943 as Empire Torridge.
Belize	Norway	World War II: The cargo ship was torpedoed and sunk in the Atlantic Ocean (47°21′N 52°08′W) off the coast of the Dominion of Newfoundland by U-754 (Kriegsmarine) with the loss of all 24 crew.
Chak Sang	United Kingdom	World War II: The cargo ship was torpedoed and sunk in the Bay of Bengal, south west of Bassein, Burma (15°42′N 95°02′E) by I-66 (Imperial Japanese Navy) with the loss of five of her 66 crew.
Ingoy	Norway	World War II:The fishing trawler was shelled and sunk by K-21 (Soviet Navy).
HMT Loch Garry	Royal Navy	The boom defence vessel ran aground off Torr Head, County Antrim and sank in a gale with rain and snow.
Nord	Panama	World War II: The cargo ship was torpedoed and sunk in the Andaman Sea, in the Preparis North Channel (15°28′N 94°36′E) by I-66 (Imperial Japanese Navy). Her crew survived.
HMS Raub	Royal Navy	World War II: The patrol boat was bombed and sunk at Belawan, Netherlands East Indies by Japanese aircraft.
Walter Ohlrogge	Germany	World War II: The cargo ship struck a mine and sank off the coast of Norway.
William Hanbury	United Kingdom	The fishing trawler was wrecked in a gale on St. Anne’s Head, Isle of Man.
William Hansen	Norway	World War II: The cargo ship was torpedoed and sunk in the Atlantic Ocean off the coast of the Dominion of Newfoundland (46°56′N 52°47′W) by U-754 (Kriegsmarine) with the loss of ten of her nineteen crew. Survivors were rescued by HMCS Algoma (Royal Canadian Navy).
Zannis L. Cambanis	Greece	World War II: The cargo ship struck a mine and sank in the Strait of Malacca 1°15′N 104°31′E) with the loss of three of her crew.

== 22 January ==
List of shipwrecks: 22 January 1942
Ship	State	Description
Athelcrown	United Kingdom	World War II: The tanker was torpedoed and sunk in the Atlantic Ocean (45°06′N 40°56′W) by U-82 (Kriegsmarine) with the loss of five of her 55 crew. Survivors were rescued by Argos Hill (United Kingdom), Saturnus (Sweden) and a Royal Navy ship.
Boyky	Soviet Navy	The Gnevny-class destroyer was driven into the submarine Shch-214 (Soviet Navy) and damaged at Tuapse.
Caledonian Monarch	United Kingdom	World War II: Convoy SC 63: The cargo ship straggled behind the convoy. She was torpedoed and sunk in the Atlantic Ocean (58°39′N 7°36′W) north west of Scotland by U-588 (Kriegsmarine) with the loss of all 48 crew.
City of Marseilles	United Kingdom	The cargo liner was driven ashore near Batticaloa, Ceylon. She was refloated.
Gandia	Belgium	World War II: Convoy ON 56: The cargo ship straggled behind the convoy. She was torpedoed and sunk in the Atlantic Ocean (approximately 45°N 41°W) by U-135 (Kriegsmarine) with the loss of 64 of her 79 crew. Only seven of eighteen survivors in lifeboat No. 2 were still alive when rescued by USS Bernadou (United States Navy) two weeks later, and only four of 28 in lifeboat No. 4 when rescued after 26 days by the fishing vessel João Corte Real (Portugal).
Innerøy	Norway	World War II: The tanker was torpedoed and sunk in the Atlantic Ocean (42°30′N 59°54′W) by U-553 (Kriegsmarine) with the loss of 31 of her 36 crew. Survivors were rescued by Empire Amethyst (United Kingdom).
Komsomelets	Soviet Navy	The minesweeper was driven ashore at Tuapse.
Lemantang	Netherlands	World War II: The cargo ship was bombed and sunk at Belawan, Netherlands East Indies by Japanese aircraft.
Molotov	Soviet Navy	The Kirov-class cruiser was driven against the quayside and damaged at Tuapse with the loss of a crew member.
Olympic	Panama	World War II: The tanker was torpedoed and sunk in the Atlantic Ocean (36°03′N 75°18′W) by U-66 (Kriegsmarine) with the loss of all 35 crew.
Republic	United States	World War II: The cargo ship was torpedoed and sunk 5 nautical miles (9.3 km) east of Hobe Sound, Florida by U-504 (Kriegsmarine) with the loss of five of her 34 crew.
Shch-214	Soviet Navy	The Shchuka-class submarine was damaged at Tuapse when she was crushed against the quayside by Boyky (Soviet Navy).
SKA-055	Soviet Navy	The patrol boat capsized at Tuapse. She was righted and then drove ashore. Fourteen of her 21 crew were lost.
TSCH-250	Soviet Navy	The minesweeper was driven ashore and wrecked at Tuapse.
Van Overstraten	Netherlands	World War II: The cargo ship was torpedoed and sunk in the Indian Ocean (1°40′N 90°30′E) by I-64 (Imperial Japanese Navy). Four of her crew were killed. There were 113 survivors.
Vassilos A. Polemis	Greece	World War II: Convoy ON 53: The cargo ship straggled behind the convoy. She was torpedoed and sunk in the Atlantic Ocean (42°32′N 52°38′W) by U-333 (Kriegsmarine) with the loss of 21 of her 33 crew.
Victoria	Italy	World War II: The troopship was torpedoed and sunk in the Mediterranean Sea (33°40′N 17°45′E) by a Fairey Albacore aircraft of 826 Squadron, Fleet Air Arm with the loss of 391 of the 1,455 people aboard. She was carrying the XXXVI Battalion of the 12th Bersaglieri Regiment and LI Tank Battalion M14/41 on a voyage from Taranto to Tripoli, Libya.
Unnamed	Soviet Union	The barge was driven ashore at Tuapse.

== 23 January ==
List of shipwrecks: 23 January 1942
Ship	State	Description
Fukuyo Maru	Japan	World War II: The cargo ship was torpedoed and damaged in the South China Sea by USS Seadragon (United States Navy). Fukuyo Maru was beached on the northern coast of French Indochina (12°00′N 109°00′E) and was later repaired.
Heim	Norway	The coaster ran aground in Hjeltefjorden. She broke in two and sank. Her crew survived.
HMS Larut	Royal Navy	World War II: The patrol vessel was bombed and sunk at Sabang, Netherlands East Indies by Japanese aircraft. Her crew were rescued.
Leiesten	Norway	World War II: Convoy ON 56: The tanker was torpedoed and sunk in the Atlantic Ocean (45°27′N 43°19′W) by U-82 (Kriegsmarine) with the loss of six of her 36 crew. Survivors were rescued by Agios Georgios ( Greece).
Manx Admiral	United Kingdom	The fishing trawler stranded on the north-east coast of Iceland and was abandoned.
Nana Maru	Imperial Japanese Navy	World War II: Battle of Balikpapan: The Seia Maru-class transport ship was bombed in the Makassar Strait east of Bontang, Netherlands East Indies by Martin 139 aircraft of the Royal Netherlands East Indies Army Air Force. She exploded and sank (00°18′N 117°43′E).
Navemar	Spain	World War II: The cargo liner was torpedoed and sunk in the Atlantic Ocean south west of Portugal by Barbarigo (Regia Marina) with the loss of two of her 36 crew. Survivors were rescued by Isla de Tenerife (Spain).
USS Neches	United States Navy	World War II: The oiler was torpedoed and sunk in the Pacific Ocean 120 nautical miles (220 km) west of Pearl Harbor, Hawaii (21°01′N 160°06′W) by I-72 (Imperial Japanese Navy) with the loss of 57 of her 183 crew. Survivors were rescued by USS Jarvis (United States Navy).
Star of Scotland	United States	The fishing barge/party ship, a former Royal Navy Flower-class sloop, sprung leaks in a storm and sank in Santa Monica Bay, California 2 nautical miles (3.7 km) off the Santa Monica Pier with the loss of one of her five crewm.
Tai Sang	United Kingdom	World War II: The cargo ship struck a Dutch mine and sank off Singapore (00°55′N 103°35′E). Of a crew of 31 and four passengers, only two survived to become prisoners of war.
Thirlby	United Kingdom	World War II: Convoy SC 66: The cargo ship straggled behind the convoy. She was torpedoed and sunk in the Atlantic Ocean (43°20′N 66°15′W) by U-109 (Kriegsmarine) with the loss of five of the 46 people aboard. Survivors were rescued by Belle Isle (United States).
Tiqva	Palestine	The cargo ship foundered in a gale near Ras el Fasori, Levant States. She was on a voyage from Iskenderun, Turkey to Port Said, Egypt with a cargo of chrome ore, poppy seed and tobacco.

== 24 January ==
List of shipwrecks: 24 January 1942
Ship	State	Description
Empire Gem	United Kingdom	World War II: The tanker was torpedoed and damaged in the Atlantic Ocean (35°06′N 74°58′W) by U-66 (Kriegsmarine). She broke in two, with the bow section sinking. The stern section was taken in tow but sank at 35°02′N 75°33′W. forty-nine of her 51 crew were lost. Both survivors were rescued by a United States Coast Guard ship.
Empire Wildebeeste	United Kingdom	World War II: Convoy SC 100: The cargo ship was torpedoed and sunk in the Atlantic Ocean (39°30′N 59°54′W) by U-106 (Kriegsmarine) with the loss of nine of her 31 crew. Survivors were rescued by USS Lang (United States Navy).
Jukka Maru	Imperial Japanese Navy	World War II: Battle of Balikpapan: The transport ship was bombed and sunk by Martin 139 aircraft of the Royal Netherlands East Indies Army Air Force.
Kuretake Maru	Imperial Japanese Navy	World War II: Battle of Balikpapan: Balikpapan Invasion Force convoy: The Kuratake Maru-class troopship was torpedoed, shelled, and sunk in the South China Sea (0°10′N 118°00′E) by USS John D. Ford (United States Navy). Six of her crew, and 172 or 272 soldiers, were killed.
MAS 512	Regia Marina	The MAS 501-class MAS boat ran aground and was wrecked at Kefalonia, Greece.
MAS 513	Regia Marina	The MAS 501-class MAS boat an aground and was wrecked at Kefalonia, Greece.
Myoken Maru	Japan	World War II: The cargo ship was torpedoed and sunk in the Celebes Sea north of Kema, Celebes, Netherlands East Indies (1°26′N 125°08′E) by USS Swordfish (United States Navy).
PB-37	Imperial Japanese Navy	World War II: Battle of Balikpapan: The patrol boat, the former Momi-class destroyer Hishi, was torpedoed and damaged at (01°24′S 117°02′E) by USS Parrott, USS Paul Jones, USS John D. Ford and USS Pope (all United States Navy). The vessel was towed into Balikpapan harbor. The crew were ordered off the ship on 5 February and repairs begun. Repairs were abandoned and the vessel was decommissioned on 10 April. PB-37 was stripped from 17–30 April and abandoned, eventually sinking. The wreck was raised and scrapped at unknown date.
Ringstad	Norway	World War II: Convoy ONS 55: The cargo ship straggled behind the convoy. She was torpedoed and sunk in the Atlantic Ocean (45°50′N 51°04′W) by U-333 (Kriegsmarine) with the loss of 30 of the 43 people aboard. Survivors were rescued by USS Swanson (United States Navy).
USS S-26	United States Navy	The S-class submarine was rammed and sunk in the Gulf of Panama by USS Sturdy (United States Navy) with the loss of 46 of her 49 crew.
Sumanoura Maru	Japan	World War II: Battle of Balikpapan: Balikpapan Invasion Force convoy: The IJN-chartered Koto Maru No. 2-class auxiliary netlayer was shelled, torpedoed and sunk by USS Pope (United States Navy) while riding at anchor. Many troops, her commanding officer, and the all but nine of her crew were killed.
Tai Sang	United Kingdom	World War II: The cargo ship struck a mine and sank in the Durian Strait between Sumatra, Netherlands East Indies and Singapore (0°55′N 103°35′E) with the loss of 29 crew, her captain, and four passengers. Two survivors were later taken as prisoners of war.
Tatsugami Maru	Imperial Japanese Navy	World War II: Battle of Balikpapan: Balikpapan Invasion Force convoy: The Tatsugami Maru-class auxiliary ammunition transport was bombed and damaged in the Makassar Strait east of Bontang, Netherlands East Indies (00°18′N 117°43′E) on 23 January by Martin 139 aircraft of the Royal Netherlands East Indies Army Air Force, then torpedoed and sunk at 01°18′S 117°04′E by USS Parrott and USS Pope (both United States Navy). Four of her crew were killed.
Tatukami Maru	Japan	World War II: Battle of Balikpapan: The cargo ship was torpedoed and sunk in the South China Sea (0°10′N 118°00′E) by United States Navy ships.
Turuga Maru	Imperial Japanese Army	World War II: Battle of Balikpapan: Balikpapan Invasion Convoy: The Toyooka Maru-class auxiliary transport was torpedoed and sunk at 00°10′N 118°00′E by submarine HNLMS K XVIII (Royal Netherlands Navy). Thirty-eight troops and a crew member were killed.
Venore	United States	World War II: The ore carrier was torpedoed and sunk in the Atlantic Ocean (34°50′N 75°20′W) by U-66 (Kriegsmarine) with the loss of seventeen of her 42 crew. Survivors were rescued by Australia (United States) and Tennessee (United Kingdom).

== 25 January ==
List of shipwrecks: 25 January 1942
Ship	State	Description
Z8 Bruno Heinemann	Kriegsmarine	World War II: The Type 1934A-class destroyer struck two mines and sank off the coast of Belgium with the loss of 98 of her crew.
Culebra	United Kingdom	World War II: The cargo ship was shelled and sunk in the Atlantic Ocean (35°30′N 53°25′W) by U-123 (Kriegsmarine) with the loss of all 45 crew.
Dalmatia L.	Germany	World War II: The cargo ship was torpedoed in the Straits of Messina (37°45′N 15°30′E) by HMS Ultimatum (Royal Navy). She broke in two and sank the next day 1 nautical mile (1.9 km) off San Ranieri, Sicily, Italy whilst under tow. Her 40 crew were rescued.
Empire Pilgrim	United Kingdom	The cargo ship ran aground 14 nautical miles (26 km) north of Aberdeen. She was holed and abandoned. She was refloated on 16 February. Subsequently repaired and returned to service.
RFA Isleford	Royal Fleet Auxiliary	The coaster was driven ashore on the north side of Wick Bay in heavy weather and was wrecked or sank with the loss of fifteen of her crew.
Mount Kitheron	Greece	World War II: The cargo shipvwas torpedoed and sunk in the Atlantic Ocean (47°32′N 52°31′W) by U-754 (Kriegsmarine) with the loss of twelve of the 36 people aboard.
Swynfleet	United Kingdom	World War II: The cargo ship struck a mine and sank in the North Sea off the Landguard Point Lighthouse, Suffolk. Her crew were rescued.
Varanger	Norway	World War II: The tanker was torpedoed and sunk in the Atlantic Ocean (38°58′N 74°06′W) by U-130 (Kriegsmarine). Her 40 crew were rescued by two American fishing vessels.
Unnamed (possibly Giang Seng)	Flag unknown ( (United Kingdom) Singapore)	World War II: The cargo ship was torpedoed and sunk in Sabang Roads by I-59 (Imperial Japanese Navy).

== 26 January ==
List of shipwrecks: 26 January 1942
Ship	State	Description
Borge F-3G	Norway	World War II: The motorboat was captured by ShCh-422 (Soviet Navy) and scuttled by shelling. Three of her crew were taken as prisoners of war.
HMS Kelana	Royal Navy	World War II: The auxiliary patrol boat was scuttled at Endau, Malaya.
Lesrix	United Kingdom	The cargo ship was wrecked in a gale with snow and heavy seas at Hackley Head, 2 nautical miles (3.7 km) north of Newburgh, Aberdeenshire. Nine of her crew were killed. Two of the crew of the lifeboat John Ryburn ( Royal National Lifeboat Institution), that had been sent to assist, were killed when the lifeboat capsized.
Refast	United Kingdom	World War II: Convoy ON 56: The tanker was torpedoed and sunk in the Atlantic Ocean (42°41′N 53°02′W) by U-582 (Kriegsmarine) with the loss of ten of her 43 crew. Survivors were rescued by Maliakos (Greece).
Sanuki Maru	Imperial Japanese Navy	World War II: The seaplane tender was bombed and sunk at Balikpapan, Netherlands East Indies by Boeing B-17 Flying Fortress aircraft of the United States Army Air Force.
HMS Shuman	Royal Navy	World War II: The auxiliary patrol vessel was scuttled at Endau. She was later salvaged and taken to Singapore.
HMAS Sirocco	Royal Australian Navy	The patrol boat was destroyed by fire at Hobart, Tasmania, burning to the waterline.
Tornator Go	Japan	The chartered cargo ship ran aground at Omaisaki. She broke in two four days later and was declared a total loss.
Traveller	United Kingdom	World War II: The cargo ship was torpedoed and sunk in the Atlantic Ocean (40°00′N 61°45′W) by U-106 (Kriegsmarine) with the loss of all 52 crew.
HNLMS Wega	Royal Netherlands Navy	World War II: The Sirius-class patrol vessel was bombed and sunk at Olele, Netherlands East Indies by Japanese aircraft.
West Ivis	United States	World War II: The cargo ship was torpedoed and sunk in the Atlantic Ocean off the coast of Virginia (35°03′N 73°10′W) by U-125 (Kriegsmarine) with the loss with all hands:- nine gunners and 36 crew.

== 27 January ==
List of shipwrecks: 27 January 1942
Ship	State	Description
HMT Eveline, or HNLMS Eveline	Royal Navy or Royal Netherlands Navy	The auxiliary minesweeper sank at Milford Haven, Pembrokeshire after a collision with HMS Shera (Royal Navy). A crew member died. (conflicting ownership between sources)
Fibreboard	Canada	The tow barge was wrecked 15 nautical miles (28 km) off Cape Scott, British Columbia.
SS Francis E. Powell	United States	World War II: The tanker was torpedoed and sunk in the Atlantic Ocean (38°05′N 74°53′W) by U-130 (Kriegsmarine) with the loss of four of her 32 crew. Survivors were rescued by W. C. Fairbanks (United States) and a United States Coast Guard vessel.
Harpa	United Kingdom	World War II: The tanker struck a mine and sank in the Singapore Strait with the loss of 39 of her 40 crew.
Hawkwood	United Kingdom	The cargo ship ran aground at Teesmouth and broke in two. The wreck was dispersed a short time later.
I-73	Imperial Japanese Navy	World War II: The Kaidai-class submarine was torpedoed and sunk in the Pacific Ocean 240 miles (390 km) west of Midway Atoll (28°24′N 178°35′E) by USS Gudgeon (United States Navy).
Icarion	Greece	World War II: The cargo ship was torpedoed and sunk in the Atlantic Ocean (46°02′N 52°22′W) by U-754 (Kriegsmarine) with the loss of nine of her 29 crew.
Jan Carstensz	Netherlands	World War II: The coastal tanker was scuttled at Amboyna, Netherlands East Indies.
Pan Norway	Norway	World War II: The tanker was torpedoed, shelled and sunk in the Atlantic Ocean (35°56′N 50°27′W) by U-123 (Kriegsmarine). Her 40 crew were rescued by Mount Aena (Switzerland).
Poelau Tello	Netherlands	World War II:The cargo ship was bombed and damaged at Padang, Sumatra, Netherlands East Indies. She was beached in Koeninginnabaai but was declared a total loss.
Punta Rubia	Spain	The cargo ship was about to leave the San Esteban de Pravia outlet channel when rough seas in a gale caused rudder failure. The current dragged her against the eastern breakwater of the mouth of the estuary, wrecking her.
HMS Thanet	Royal Navy	World War II: Battle off Endau: The S-class destroyer was sunk off Endau, Malaya by Sendai, Yūgiri, Fubuki, Asagiri, and W-1 (all Imperial Japanese Navy). Thirty-seven of her crew were killed. Two more drowned when their lifeboat hit a reef. Eight of her crew were rescued on 29 January, and 54 crewmen and two Royal Air Force pilots on 30 January by HMS Giang Bee (Royal Navy). Thirty-one crewmen were rescued by Shirayuki (Imperial Japanese Navy) and made prisoners of war, of which four died in captivity.

== 28 January ==
List of shipwrecks: 28 January 1942
Ship	State	Description
Bjørnvik	Norway	World War II: Convoy WP 103: The cargo ship was bombed and sunk in the English Channel off Hartland Point, Devon, United Kingdom by Luftwaffe aircraft with the loss of seventeen of her twenty crew.
Boelongan	Netherlands	World War II: The cargo ship (1,053 GRT) was bombed and sunk at Padang, Netherlands East Indies by Japanese aircraft. There were no casualties.
USAT General Royal T. Frank	United States Army	World War II: The transport was torpedoed by the I-171. She split in two and sank in one minute 2 miles (3.2 km) west of Maui, Hawaii Territory. Twenty-four of the 60 people aboard were killed.
Idar	United Kingdom	World War II: The paddle steamer was shelled and damaged in the Indian Ocean (10°12′N 80°13′E) by I-64 (Imperial Japanese Navy). Idar was beached, and was later salvaged.
M 1406 Glettkau	Kriegsmarine	World War II: The auxiliary minesweeper was bombed and sunk at Rotterdam, South Holland, Netherlands during an air raid. Four of her crew were wounded. She was raised and resumed service as M 4014.
Ninuccia	Italy	World War II: The cargo ship (4,583 GRT) was torpedoed and sunk in the Adriatic Sea off Cape Planka, Yugoslavia (43°30′N 15°55′E), by HMS Thorn (Royal Navy). Before being sunk with a torpedo the ship had been missed with four other torpedoes and then engaged and damaged with gunfire. There were eight dead and 19 survivors.

== 29 January ==
List of shipwrecks: 29 January 1942
Ship	State	Description
Braconbush	United Kingdom	World War II: The fishing trawler, a sold off Strath class naval trawler, struck a mine and was damaged in the North Sea 2 nautical miles (3.7 km) south east of Duncansby Head, Caithness. She was taken under tow but sank before reaching Scrabster. Her crew were rescued.
Buyskes	Netherlands	World War II: The cargo ship was bombed and sunk at Padang by Japanese aircraft.
Crown	United Kingdom	World War II: The fishing boat was bombed and sunk at Rosehearty, Aberdeenshire by Luftwaffe aircraft.
Elout	Netherlands	World War II: The cargo ship was bombed and sunk at Padang by Japanese aircraft.
Emba	Soviet Union	World War II: The tanker was bombed and severely damaged in the Black Sea off Kamysh Burun by Luftwaffe aircraft. She was subsequently used as a hulk at Sokhumi, where she was torpedoed and sunk on 30 July 1943.
Florence Luckenbach	United States	World War II: The cargo ship was torpedoed and sunk in the Indian Ocean 15 nautical miles (28 km) east of Madras, India (12°55′N 80°33′E) by I-64 (Imperial Japanese Navy). There were no casualties and all 38 crew reached Madras in lifeboats.
Northgate Scot	United Kingdom	World War II: The tug was bombed and damaged at Falmouth, Cornwall by Luftwaffe aircraft and was beached. She was later salvaged, repaired and returned to service.
Ocean Gift	United Kingdom	World War II: The fishing boat was bombed and sunk at Rosehearty by Luftwaffe aircraft.
Poelau Tello	Netherlands	World War II: The cargo ship was bombed and sunk at Padang by Japanese aircraft.
Polaris	Finland	World War II:The cargo ship suffered an explosion and fire while under repair at Turku. Declared a total loss, but raised by the Soviets, repaired and returned to service as Sestroretsk.
Samwater	United Kingdom	The Liberty ship caught fire and sank in the Atlantic Ocean 35 nautical miles (65 km) west of Cape Finisterre, Spain. She was on a voyage from Sydney, New South Wales, Australia to Liverpool, Lancashire.
HMT Sotra	Royal Navy	World War II: Convoy TA 21: The minesweeping naval whaler, or naval trawler, was torpedoed and sunk in the Mediterranean Sea 80 miles (130 km) east of Tobruk (32°07′N 25°30′E) by U-431 (Kriegsmarine) with the loss of all 22 crew.
HMT Soubrette	Royal Navy	The naval trawler was lost on this date.

== 30 January ==
List of shipwrecks: 30 January 1942
Ship	State	Description
USCGC Alexander Hamilton	United States Coast Guard	World War II: Convoy HX 170: The Treasury-class cutter capsized after being torpedoed and damaged the previous day in the Atlantic Ocean off Reykjavík, Iceland (64°10′N 22°56′W), by U-132 (Kriegsmarine) with the loss of seven of her 221 crew. She was scuttled by USS Ericsson (United States Navy).
Bobie	United Kingdom	The cargo ship was sunk in a collision with Andelle (United Kingdom) in Swansea Bay.
Fertilia	Italy	World War II: The cargo ship was sunk by a mine in the Adriatic Sea 10 nautical miles (19 km) north east of Brindisi.
Ingøy	Norway	World War II: The coaster struck a mine and sank off Måsøya with the loss of sixteen of the 23 people aboard.
Jalatarang	India	World War II: The cargo ship was torpedoed and sunk in the Indian Ocean (12°50′N 81°00′E) by I-64 (Imperial Japanese Navy) with the loss of 38 of her 49 crew.
HMT Loch Alsh	Royal Navy	World War II: The naval trawler was bombed and sunk in the North Sea 30 nautical miles (56 km) north of Skegness, Lincolnshire, by Luftwaffe aircraft. Her crew survived.
Medusa	Regia Marina	World War II: The Argonauta-class submarine (650 GRT) was torpedoed and sunk in the Adriatic Sea north of Pola (44°54′N 13°46′E), by HMS Thorn (Royal Navy). Of the 8 men in the cupola, three were killed, one drowned and two died of their wounds after rescue. Of the 52 other crew, 14 survived the sinking in an isolated torpedo room but attempts to rescue them were delayed by bad weather and all died, leaving only 2 survivors and 58 dead overall.
USC&GS Research	United States Coast and Geodetic Survey	World War II: The survey ship was damaged indirectly by bombing off Corregidor, Philippines, partially sinking from leaks on Corregidor and then floating away on the tide and grounding on the Bataan Peninsula in a sinking condition.
Rochester	United States	World War II: The tanker was torpedoed and sunk in the Atlantic Ocean (37°10′N 73°58′W) by U-106 (Kriegsmarine) with the loss of four of her 35 crew. Survivors were rescued by USS Roe (United States Navy).
Scarweather Lightship	Trinity House	The lightship was sunk when struck by HMT Rosette (Royal Navy) at Scarweather Sands (51°27′N 03°55′W), approximately 5 nautical miles (9.3 km) offshore from Sker Point, Glamorgan.
Singkil	Netherlands	World War II: The coaster was shelled and sunk by Royal Netherlands East Indies Army artillery at Ambon, Netherlands East Indies to prevent capture.
Urara Maru	Imperial Japanese Navy	The Tokushima Maru-class auxiliary minelayer ran aground on a reef off the jetty at Tairadate. She was refloated on 1 February, arrived at Kurosaki on 2 February 1942 and entered drydock for repair on 3 February 1942. Repairs were completed on 26 February.

== 31 January ==
List of shipwrecks: 31 January 1942
Ship	State	Description
HMS Belmont	Royal Navy	World War II: Convoy NA 2: The Clemson-class destroyer was torpedoed and sunk in the Atlantic Ocean off the coast of the Dominion of Newfoundland (42°02′N 57°18′W) by U-82 (Kriegsmarine) with the loss of all 138 crew.
HMS Culver	Royal Navy	World War II: Convoy SL 98: The Banff-class sloop was torpedoed and sunk in the Atlantic Ocean south west of Ireland (48°43′N 20°14′W) by U-105 (Kriegsmarine) with the loss of all 114 crew.
Empire Redshank	United Kingdom	World War II: The Design 1037 ship was bombed and damaged by Luftwaffe aircraft north west of the Shetland Islands. She was repaired and returned to service.
Helgoland	Germany	The cargo ship was lost off Bogskär, Finland due to ice damage.
Jalapalaka	India	World War II: The cargo ship was torpedoed and sunk in the Indian Ocean (13°00′N 81°08′E) by I-64 (Imperial Japanese Navy) with the loss of thirteen of her 67 crew.
Kwandang	Netherlands	World War II: The tender was shelled and sunk by Royal Netherlands East Indies Army artillery at Ambon, Netherlands East Indies to prevent capture.
Lady Charlotte	United Kingdom	World War II: The yawl was bombed and sunk at Eyemouth, Berwickshire by Luftwaffe aircraft.
San Arcadio	United Kingdom	World War II: The tanker (7,419 GRT) was torpedoed and sunk in the Atlantic Ocean (38°10′N 63°50′W) by U-107 (Kriegsmarine). Only one crew was lost in the sinking but two of the three lifeboats disappeared later in bad weather bringing the death toll to 41 (thirty eight crew and three gunners). The survivors, seven crew and two gunners, were rescued by a Martin PBM Mariner aircraft of the United States Navy.
Spreewald	Germany	World War II: The cargo ship was torpedoed and sunk in the Atlantic Ocean 450 nautical miles (830 km) north of the Azores, Portugal (45°12′N 24°50′W) by U-333 (Kriegsmarine) with the loss of 72 of the 152 crew and prisoners of war aboard. At the time of her loss, she was disguised as Elk (Norway).
HMT Unicity	Royal Navy	The auxiliary minesweeping naval drifter capsized and sank in the North Sea off Blyth, Northumberland during a storm with the loss of a crew member.

== Unknown date ==
List of shipwrecks: Unknown date 1942
Ship	State	Description
Islas Filipinas	Philippines	World War II: The cargo ship was bombed and sunk in Manila Bay by Japanese aircraft.
Kommunist	Soviet Union	The cargo ship was wrecked in the Black Sea between 19 and 23 January. Lost with all 34 of her crew.
Leyte	Philippines	World War II: The cargo liner was sunk at Cebu by Japanese aircraft.
PiLB 1	Kriegsmarine	The PiLB 39 Type personnel landing craft was lost sometime in January.
HMS Triumph	Royal Navy	The T-class submarine disappeared between 30 December 1941 and 9 January 1942 with the loss of all 59 crew. Possibly struck a mine and sank in the Mediterranean Sea.
U-337	Kriegsmarine	The Type VIIC submarine was last heard from on 3 January. The vessel was declared missing on 24 January.
