= Wolfpack Zieten =

Wolfpack Zieten 1
- Active: 6–22 January 1942
- Country: Nazi Germany
- Branch: Kriegsmarine
- Size: 12 submarines

Commanders
- Notable commanders: Peter-Erich Cremer; Rolf Mützelburg; Erich Topp; Karl Thurmann

Wolfpack Ziethen 2
- Active: 23–29 March 1942
- Country: Nazi Germany
- Branch: Kriegsmarine
- Size: 4 submarines

Zieten was the name given to two wolfpacks of German U-boats that operated during the Battle of the Atlantic in 1942 during the Second World War, the first, larger and more successful was from 6 to 22 January 1942, the second, smaller from 23 to 29 March 1942.

It was named after Hans Joachim von Zieten (1699–1786), a German cavalry officer at the time of Frederick the Great.

== Zieten 1 ==
The group was responsible for sinking eleven merchant ships 39,900 gross register tons (GRT) and damaging a further three merchant ships 17,621 GRT.

=== Raiding History ===
Date	U-boat	Name of ship	Nationality	GRT	Convoy	Fate
6 January 1942	U-701	Baron Erskine	United Kingdom	3,657	SC-62	Sunk
15 January 1942	U-203	Catalina	Portugal	632		Sunk
15 January 1942	U-552	Dayrose	United Kingdom	4,113		Sunk
15 January 1942	U-553	Diala	United Kingdom	8,106	ON 52	Damaged
16 January 1942	U-86	Toorak	United Kingdom	8,627	ON 52	Damaged
17 January 1942	U-87	Nyholt	Norway	8,087	ON 52	Sunk
17 January 1942	U-203	Octavian	Norway	1,345		Sunk
18 January 1942	U-86	Dimitrios G. Thermiotis	Greece	4,271	SC-63	Sunk
18 January 1942	U-552	Frances Salman	United States	2,609		Sunk
21 January 1942	U-754	Belize	Norway	2,153		Sunk
21 January 1942	U-203	North Gaspe	Canada	888		Damaged
22 January 1942	U-553	Innerøy	Norway	8,260		Sunk
22 January 1942	U-333	Vassilios A. Polemis	Greece	3,429	ON 53	Sunk
22 January 1942	U-754	William Hansen	Norway	1,344		Sunk
Total:				57,521		

=== U-boats ===
U-boat	Commander	From	To
U-84	Horst Uphoff	13 January 1942	22 January 1942
U-86	Walter Schug	7 January 1942	22 January 1942
U-87	Joachim Berger	6 January 1942	17 January 1942
U-135	Friedrich-Hermann Praetorius	6 January 1942	20 January 1942
U-203	Rolf Mützelburg	7 January 1942	22 January 1942
U-333	Peter-Erich Cremer	17 January 1942	22 January 1942
U-552	Erich Topp	6 January 1942	19 January 1942
U-553	Karl Thurmann	6 January 1942	22 January 1942
U-582	Werner Schulte	15 January 1942	22 January 1942
U-654	Ludwig Forster	6 January 1942	22 January 1942
U-701	Horst Degen	6 January 1942	22 January 1942
U-754	Hans Oestermann	6 January 1942	22 January 1942

== Zieten 2 ==
The group had no success and lost one U-boat.

=== U-boats ===
U-boat	Commander	From	To
U-209	Heinrich Brodda	23 March 1942	29 March 1942
U-376	Friedrich-Karl Marks	23 March 1942	29 March 1942
U-378	Alfred Hoschatt	23 March 1942	29 March 1942
U-655	Adolf Dumrese	23 March 1942	24 March 1942
