= VPB-92 =

Patrol Bombing Squadron 92
- Active: 26 December 1941 – 28 May 1945
- Country: United States of America
- Branch: United States Navy
- Type: squadron
- Role: Maritime patrol
- Engagements: World War II

Aircraft flown
- Patrol: PBY-5A Catalina

VPB-92 was a Patrol Bombing Squadron of the U.S. Navy. The squadron was established as Patrol Squadron 92 (VP-92) on 26 December 1941, redesignated as Patrol Bombing Squadron 92 (VPB-91) on 1 October 1944 and disestablished on 28 May 1945. It operated the PBY-5A Catalina throughout its operational history.

== Operational history ==
- 26 December 1941 – 15 January 1942: VP-92 was established at NAS Alameda, California, as a seaplane squadron flying the PBY-5A Catalina under the operational control of PatWing-8. The squadron personnel began ground training at NAS Alameda, with flights commencing after the arrival of the first Catalinas from the factory on 15 January 1942.
- 5–15 March 1942: VP-92 began a transcontinental flight from NAS Alameda, Calif., to NS San Juan, Puerto Rico. The unassigned flight crews and ground support staff departed for Florida by train. On 15 March, these personnel boarded USS Pastores for transportation to San Juan. Upon arrival the squadron came under the operational control of PatWing-3. When the first aircraft of VP-92 landed at San Juan, the beaching party had never seen an amphibious Catalina. The aircraft landed in the bay and proceeded at taxi speed for the beaching apron while lowering their wheels into the water. The beaching crews panicked, thinking that the crews were going to run the aircraft into the concrete. They were amazed when the aircraft emerged from the water on dry land with wheels already attached.
- 12 March – May 1942: A detachment of five aircraft were assigned to NAS Guantanamo Bay, Cuba. On 13 March three of these aircraft were sent to Antigua. This detachment was increased to five aircraft on 25 March. The Guantanamo detachment mission was to protect convoy shipping throughout the Caribbean. The Antigua detachment was to prevent the Vichy French surface vessels from supplying German and French submarines operating in the Caribbean area. To further meet this goal, the Antigua detachment was moved on 5 May to St. Lucia, which put it closer to Martinique. Two attacks on U-boats were made during the month of May, but postwar examination of German records indicates no damage to any units during that time.
- 19 June 1942: The St. Lucia detachment was recalled to San Juan to rejoin the squadron. The Vichy French at Martinque capitulated on 14 May, releasing squadron assets previously engaged in monitoring that threat.
- 24 June – 5 July 1942: A detachment of three aircraft was sent to Camagüey, Cuba. On 5 July, the entire squadron left San Juan for NAS Guantanamo Bay. Once arrived and operational, the primary mission assigned was air-sea rescue work and occasional Anti-submarine warfare (ASW) patrols.
- 15–27 August 1942: Operational control of the squadron was shifted from PatWing-3 to PatWing-11 on 15 August. On 27 August a squadron PBY-5A Catalina piloted by Lieutenant G. R. Fiss dropped depth charges on a U-boat. The Catalina's attack was followed-up by the Canadian corvette HMCS Oakville which rammed U-94, sinking it with a loss of 19 and 26 survivors.
- 19 September 1942: A two-aircraft detachment was sent to Great Exuma to patrol that area and the Bahamas. Two days later, another two-aircraft detachment was sent to Trinidad to conduct ASW and antishipping patrols. On 24 September one of the Exuma detachment aircraft crashed while attempting to land in the unlighted harbor at night. The aircraft was a total loss and several of the crew injured.
- 7–10 October 1942: All detachments rejoined the squadron at NAS Guantanamo Bay. VP-92 was then divided into two sections. The first division departed on 22 October for French Morocco under the operational control of FAW-15 (scheduled for establishment on 1 December 1942), followed by the second division on 25 October. Spare crews and ground support personnel departed Guantanamo aboard USS Biscayne on 23 October.
- 13 November 1942: Two squadron aircraft caught a submarine on the surface 700 miles (1,100 km) off Casablanca that refused to answer recognition signals. Lieutenant H. S. Blake made a run on the submarine and blew off the conning tower, sinking the sub immediately with no survivors sighted. Postwar records indicate that the submarine in question was the 1,570-ton Vichy French submarine Le Conquérant.
- 14 November 1942: VP-92 began operational flying from NAAF Cazes Field, Casablanca, French Morocco
- 31 December 1942: The squadron received its first German bombing raid. No damage to aircraft or personnel resulted from the raid as there had been advance intelligence on the possibility of a raid. All aircraft had been dispersed to reduce damage. Patrols and convoy coverage flown from Cazes Field extended from the Mediterranean to the Azores and Canary Islands.
- 6 April – 23 June 1943: VP-92 was relocated to NAS Port Lyautey, French Morocco. Patrols of the Mediterranean, photographic missions and ferry trips to Gibraltar comprised most of the squadron's missions during this period. On 11 April, one aircraft crashed on takeoff, killing the pilot and three crew members. On 23 June, a four-aircraft detachment was sent to Agadir, French Morocco, to guard against German blockade-runners.
- 6 July 1943: Lieutenant (jg) G. R. Morris and crew attacked a surfaced U-boat five miles from a convoy they were covering. Accurate anti-aircraft fire from the U-boat killed radioman ARM3c E. J. Gibson and wounded several others of the crew, including Morris himself. Depth charges and strafing from the Catalina apparently damaged the U-boat sufficiently to prevent its attacking the convoy. Despite their injuries, the aircrew remained on station for another two hours until relieved, protecting the convoy from further attack. For his valiant efforts in protecting the convoy Lieutenant (jg) Morris was awarded the Navy Cross.

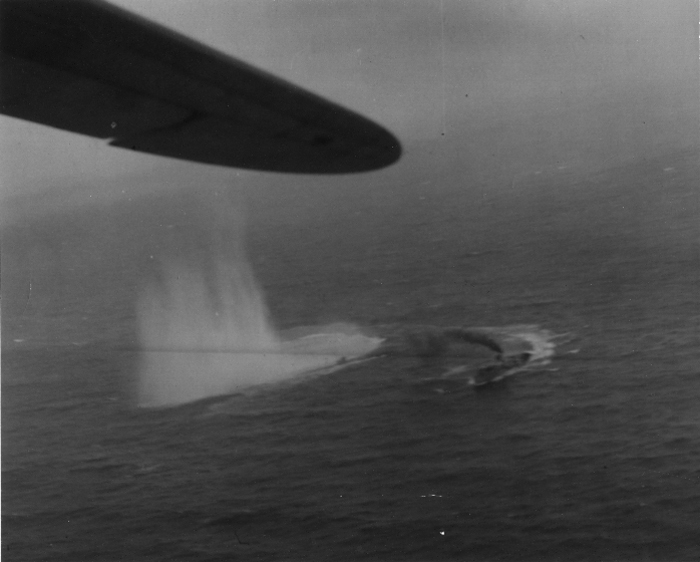
View from VP-92 PBY-5A of the attack on U-135 on 15 July 1943

- 15 July 1943: Lieutenant R. J. Finnie assisted in the sinking of U-135, off the coast of Morocco near the port of Agadir. Finnie's depth bombs damaged the submarine, allowing British sloop HMS Rochester and the corvettes HMS Migonette and HMS Balsam to finish it off. Five of the crew perished; 41 survived and were picked up by the destroyers.
- 23 November 1943: A squadron aircraft crashed on the breakwater at Port Lyautey, during a practice depth charge run. The starboard wing tip touched the water in a steep turn, tearing off the wing. All hands were lost.
- 5 December 1943: The entire squadron was transferred to NAAF Agadir, F.M., to relieve VP-73. The base was still under construction and had few amenities.
- 29 February 1944: VPB-92 was transferred to the British West Indies under the control of FAW-11. One detachment of six aircraft was sent to Hato Field, Curaçao, and another to Zandrey Field, Surinam. The detachments conducted daily sweeps and patrols of the convoy routes in the Caribbean. Heavy, torrential tropical rains frequently kept the detachment at Zandrey Field grounded for days at a time during this period, bringing criticism from FAW-11. The squadron had its revenge, however, when the commander of FAW-11 was grounded for two days due to weather during a visit to the squadron. The Curaçao detachment had no problems with the weather and patrols were conducted on schedule.
- 14 May – July 1944: The squadron moved to NAS San Juan, for training, while one four-aircraft detachment remained at Curaçao. On 9 July the squadron had 12 aircraft at Curaçao and three at San Juan for long-range patrol work and ASW standby.
- 29 November 1944: VPB-92 transferred to NAS Quonset Point, Rhode Island, under FAW-9, with a detachment of two aircraft remaining at Curaçao for long-range patrol work. The Quonset Point portion of the squadron was assigned convoy patrol coverage missions and ASW sweeps protecting the approaches to New York harbor. Weather was again a problem for operations, only this time it was snow and ice that held the squadron on the deck.
- 18 – 28 May 1945: VPB-92 received orders to disestablish. On 24 May all the squadron aircraft were flown to NAS Norfolk, Virginia, where the aircraft were turned over to HEDRON-5. The squadron was formally disestablished on 28 May 1945.

== Home port assignments ==
The squadron was assigned to these home ports, effective on the dates shown:

- NAS Alameda, California - 26 December 1941
- NS San Juan, Puerto Rico - 5 March 1942
- NAS Guantanamo Bay, Cuba - 5 July 1942
- NAAF Cazes Field, Casablanca, French Morocco - 14 November 1942
- NAS Port Lyautey, French Morocco - 6 April 1943
- NAAF Agadir, French Morocco - 5 December 1943
- British West Indies - 29 February 1944
- NAS Quonset Point, Rhode Island - 29 November 1944

== See also ==
- Maritime patrol aircraft
- List of inactive United States Navy aircraft squadrons
- List of United States Navy aircraft squadrons
- List of squadrons in the Dictionary of American Naval Aviation Squadrons
- History of the United States Navy
