= German submarine U-581 =

German World War II submarine

History

Nazi Germany
- Name: U-581
- Ordered: 8 January 1940
- Builder: Blohm & Voss, Hamburg
- Yard number: 557
- Laid down: 25 September 1940
- Launched: 12 June 1941
- Commissioned: 31 July 1941
- Fate: Sunk on 2 February 1942

General characteristics
- Class & type: Type VIIC submarine
- Displacement: 769 tonnes (757 long tons) surfaced; 871 t (857 long tons) submerged
- Length: 67.10 m (220 ft 2 in) o/a; 50.50 m (165 ft 8 in) pressure hull
- Beam: 6.20 m (20 ft 4 in) o/a; 4.70 m (15 ft 5 in) pressure hull
- Height: 9.60 m (31 ft 6 in)
- Draught: 4.74 m (15 ft 7 in)
- Installed power: 2,800–3,200 PS (2,100–2,400 kW; 2,800–3,200 bhp) (diesels); 750 PS (550 kW; 740 shp) (electric)
- Propulsion: 2 shafts; 2 × diesel engines; 2 × electric motors
- Speed: 17.7 knots (32.8 km/h; 20.4 mph) surfaced; 7.6 knots (14.1 km/h; 8.7 mph) submerged
- Range: 8,500 nmi (15,700 km; 9,800 mi) at 10 knots (19 km/h; 12 mph) surfaced; 80 nmi (150 km; 92 mi) at 4 knots (7.4 km/h; 4.6 mph) submerged
- Test depth: 230 m (750 ft); Crush depth: 250–295 m (820–968 ft)
- Complement: 4 officers, 40–56 enlisted
- Armament: 5 × 53.3 cm (21 in) torpedo tubes (four bow, one stern); 14 × torpedoes or 26 TMA mines; 1 × 8.8 cm (3.46 in) deck gun (220 rounds); 1 x 2 cm (0.79 in) C/30 AA gun

Service record
- Part of: 5th U-boat Flotilla; 31 July – 30 November 1941; 7th U-boat Flotilla; 1 December 1941 – 2 February 1942
- Identification codes: M 46 386
- Commanders: Kptlt. Werner Pfeifer; 31 July 1941 – 2 February 1942
- Operations: 2 patrols: 1st patrol: 13 – 24 December 1941; 2nd patrol: 11 January – 2 February 1942
- Victories: 1 auxiliary warship sunk (364 GRT)

German submarine U-581 was a Type VIIC U-boat of Nazi Germany's Kriegsmarine during World War II.

She carried out two patrols and sank one auxiliary warship of 364 GRT.

She was scuttled by her own crew after being pursued and attacked by a British warship near the Azores on 2 February 1942. After 20 years of search, in 2016, in a depth of approx. 900 m, the boat was discovered and filmed.

== Design ==
German Type VIIC submarines were preceded by the shorter Type VIIB submarines. U-581 had a displacement of 769 tonnes (757 long tons) when at the surface and 871 tonnes (857 long tons) while submerged. She had a total length of 67.10 m (220 ft 2 in), a pressure hull length of 50.50 m (165 ft 8 in), a beam of 6.20 m (20 ft 4 in), a height of 9.60 m (31 ft 6 in), and a draught of 4.74 m (15 ft 7 in). The submarine was powered by two Germaniawerft F46 four-stroke, six-cylinder supercharged diesel engines producing a total of 2,800 to 3,200 metric horsepower (2,060 to 2,350 kW; 2,760 to 3,160 shp) for use while surfaced, two Brown, Boveri & Cie GG UB 720/8 double-acting electric motors producing a total of 750 metric horsepower (550 kW; 740 shp) for use while submerged. She had two shafts and two 1.23 m (4 ft) propellers. The boat was capable of operating at depths of up to 230 metres (750 ft).

The submarine had a maximum surface speed of 17.7 knots (32.8 km/h; 20.4 mph) and a maximum submerged speed of 7.6 knots (14.1 km/h; 8.7 mph). When submerged, the boat could operate for 80 nautical miles (150 km; 92 mi) at 4 knots (7.4 km/h; 4.6 mph); when surfaced, she could travel 8,500 nautical miles (15,700 km; 9,800 mi) at 10 knots (19 km/h; 12 mph). U-581 was fitted with five 53.3 cm (21 in) torpedo tubes (four fitted at the bow and one at the stern), fourteen torpedoes, one 8.8 cm (3.46 in) SK C/35 naval gun, 220 rounds, and a 2 cm (0.79 in) C/30 anti-aircraft gun. The boat had a complement of between forty-four and sixty.

== Service history ==
The submarine was laid down on 25 September 1940 at Blohm & Voss, Hamburg as yard number 557, launched on 12 June 1941 and commissioned on 31 July under the command of Kapitänleutnant Werner Pfeifer.

She served with the 5th U-boat Flotilla from 31 July 1941 for training and moved to the 7th flotilla for operations until her loss, from 1 December 1941 until 2 February 1942.

=== First patrol ===
The boat departed Kiel on 13 December 1941, moved through the North Sea, negotiated the gap between the Faroe and Shetland Islands and entered the Atlantic Ocean. She docked at St. Nazaire on the French Atlantic coast on the 24 December 1941.

=== Second patrol and loss ===
For her second foray, U-581 left St. Nazaire on 11 January 1942. On 19 January, she likely sank the British armed trawler HMS Rosemonde northeast of the Azores. There is an element of doubt because the small warship was not reported missing until this date.

U-581 was sunk by depth charges from the British destroyer HMS Westcott near the Azores on 2 February 1942. Four men died; there were 41 survivors.

One of U-581's officers, Walter Sitek, swam six kilometres to land. He was repatriated to Germany through neutral Spain. Sitek survived the war.

== Summary of raiding history ==
Date	Ship Name	Nationality	Tonnage (Note: Merchant ship tonnages are in gross register tons. Military vessels are listed by tons displacement.)	Fate
19 January 1942	HMS Rosemonde	Royal Navy	364	Sunk

== Bibliography ==
- Busch, Rainer; Röll, Hans-Joachim (1999). German U-boat commanders of World War II : a biographical dictionary. Translated by Brooks, Geoffrey. London, Annapolis, Md: Greenhill Books, Naval Institute Press. ISBN 1-55750-186-6.
- Busch, Rainer; Röll, Hans-Joachim (1999). Der U-Boot-Krieg, 1939-1945: Deutsche U-Boot-Verluste von September 1939 bis Mai 1945 [German U-boat losses from September 1939 to May 1945] (in German). Vol. IV. Hamburg, Berlin, Bonn: Mittler. ISBN 3-8132-0514-2.
- Gröner, Eric; Jung, Dieter; Maass, Martin (1991). German Warships 1815-1945: U-boats and Mine Warfare Vessels. Vol. 2. Translated by Thomas, Keith; Magowan, Rachel. London: Conway Maritime Press. ISBN 0-85177-593-4.
- Kemp, Paul (1999). U-Boats Destroyed - German Submarine Losses in the World Wars. London: Arms & Armour. ISBN 1-85409-515-3.
