= German submarine U-135 (1941) =

German World War II submarine

Coordinates: 28°20′N 13°17′W

History

Nazi Germany
- Name: U-135
- Ordered: 7 August 1939
- Builder: Bremer Vulkan, Bremen-Vegesack
- Yard number: 14
- Laid down: 16 September 1940
- Launched: 12 June 1941
- Commissioned: 16 August 1941
- Fate: Sunk, 15 July 1943

General characteristics
- Class & type: Type VIIC submarine
- Displacement: 769 tonnes (757 long tons) surfaced; 871 t (857 long tons) submerged
- Length: 67.10 m (220 ft 2 in) o/a; 50.50 m (165 ft 8 in) pressure hull
- Beam: 6.20 m (20 ft 4 in) o/a; 4.70 m (15 ft 5 in) pressure hull
- Height: 9.60 m (31 ft 6 in)
- Draught: 4.72 m (15 ft 6 in)
- Installed power: 2,800–3,200 PS (2,100–2,400 kW; 2,800–3,200 bhp) (diesels); 750 PS (550 kW; 740 shp) (electric)
- Propulsion: 2 shafts; 2 × diesel engines; 2 × electric motors
- Speed: 17.7 knots (32.8 km/h; 20.4 mph) surfaced; 7.6 knots (14.1 km/h; 8.7 mph) submerged
- Range: 8,500 nmi (15,700 km; 9,800 mi) at 10 knots (19 km/h; 12 mph) surfaced; 80 nmi (150 km; 92 mi) at 4 knots (7.4 km/h; 4.6 mph) submerged
- Test depth: 230 m (750 ft); Calculated crush depth: 250–295 m (820–968 ft)
- Complement: 4 officers, 40–56 enlisted
- Armament: 5 × 53.3 cm (21 in) torpedo tubes (four bow, one stern); 14 × torpedoes; 1 × 8.8 cm (3.46 in) deck gun(220 rounds); 1 × 2 cm Flak 38 gun

Service record
- Part of: 5th U-boat Flotilla; 16 August – 1 December 1941; 7th U-boat Flotilla; 1 December 1941 – 15 July 1943
- Identification codes: M 00 150
- Commanders: Oblt.z.S. / Kptlt. Friedrich-Hermann Praetorius; 16 August 1941 – November 1942; Oblt.z.S. Heinz Schütt; November 1942 – 3 June 1943; Oblt.z.S. Otto Luther; 4 June – 15 July 1943
- Operations: 7 patrols: 1st patrol: 24 December 1941 – 31 January 1942; 2nd patrol: 22 February – 3 April 1942; 3rd patrol: 26 April – 5 July 1942; 4th patrol: 8 August – 3 October 1942; 5th patrol: 21 November – 26 December 1942; 6th patrol: 24 January – 10 March 1942; 7th patrol: 7 June – 15 July 1943
- Victories: 3 merchant ships sunk (21,302 GRT); 1 merchant ship damaged (4,762 GRT)

German submarine U-135 was a Type VIIC U-boat of Nazi Germany's Kriegsmarine during World War II.

She was laid down at the Vulkan-Vegesackerwerft in Bremen on 16 September 1940 as yard number 14, launched on 12 June 1941 and commissioned on 16 August with Oberleutnant zur See Friederich-Hermann Praetorius in command.

U-135 began her service career in training with the 5th U-boat Flotilla, before moving on to the 7th flotilla for operations.

== Design ==
German Type VIIC submarines were preceded by the shorter Type VIIB submarines. U-135 had a displacement of 769 tonnes (757 long tons) when at the surface and 871 tonnes (857 long tons) while submerged. She had a total length of 67.10 m (220 ft 2 in), a pressure hull length of 50.50 m (165 ft 8 in), a beam of 6.20 m (20 ft 4 in), a height of 9.60 m (31 ft 6 in), and a draught of 4.74 m (15 ft 7 in). The submarine was powered by two MAN M 6 V 40/46 four-stroke, six-cylinder supercharged diesel engines producing a total of 2,800 to 3,200 metric horsepower (2,060 to 2,350 kW; 2,760 to 3,160 shp) for use while surfaced, two Brown, Boveri & Cie GG UB 720/8 double-acting electric motors producing a total of 750 metric horsepower (550 kW; 740 shp) for use while submerged. She had two shafts and two 1.23 m (4 ft) propellers. The boat was capable of operating at depths of up to 230 metres (750 ft).

The submarine had a maximum surface speed of 17.7 knots (32.8 km/h; 20.4 mph) and a maximum submerged speed of 7.6 knots (14.1 km/h; 8.7 mph). When submerged, the boat could operate for 80 nautical miles (150 km; 92 mi) at 4 knots (7.4 km/h; 4.6 mph); when surfaced, she could travel 8,500 nautical miles (15,700 km; 9,800 mi) at 10 knots (19 km/h; 12 mph). U-135 was fitted with five 53.3 cm (21 in) torpedo tubes (four fitted at the bow and one at the stern), fourteen torpedoes, one 8.8 cm (3.46 in) SK C/35 naval gun, 220 rounds, and a 2 cm (0.79 in) C/30 anti-aircraft gun. The boat had a complement of between forty-four and sixty.

== Service history ==
The boat sank three ships totalling 21,302 gross register tons (GRT) and damaged a fourth of 4,762 GRT.

=== First and second patrols ===
The submarine's first patrol began with her departure from Kiel on 24 December 1941. Her route took her across the North Sea and into the Atlantic Ocean via the passage between the Orkney and Shetland Islands. As part of wolfpack 'Ziethen', she sank Gandia on 22 January 1942 420 nmi (780 km; 480 mi) east of Cape Race, (Newfoundland). She arrived at St. Nazaire in occupied France on the 31st.

Her second foray was northeast of Iceland, but she returned to another port, Brest, on 3 April 1942.

=== Third and fourth patrols ===
Her third sortie was her longest, at 71 days. Having departed Brest on 26 April 1942, she sank Fort Qu Appelle on 17 May north of Bermuda. She also sank Pleasantville on 8 June northwest of Bermuda before returning to St. Nazaire on 5 June.

U-135 discovered and shadowed convoy ON 122 during her fourth patrol, and was able to remain on patrol following heavy damage received when attacked with depth charges and Hedgehog by HNoMS Potentilla and HMS Viscount. The boat was later attacked by a Czech-crewed Vickers Wellington aircraft of No. 311 Squadron RAF on 3 October 1942 in the Bay of Biscay. Only minor damage was sustained, but one man was killed and another died of his wounds.

=== Fifth and sixth patrols ===
Her fifth sortie took her across the Atlantic, almost to the coast of Newfoundland.

U-135's sixth patrol was toward Greenland; she was attacked by a British B-24 Liberator of 120 Squadron northeast of Ireland on 8 February 1943. Some damage was repaired, but the boat was forced to return to Lorient on 10 March when further leaks were discovered.

=== Seventh patrol and loss ===
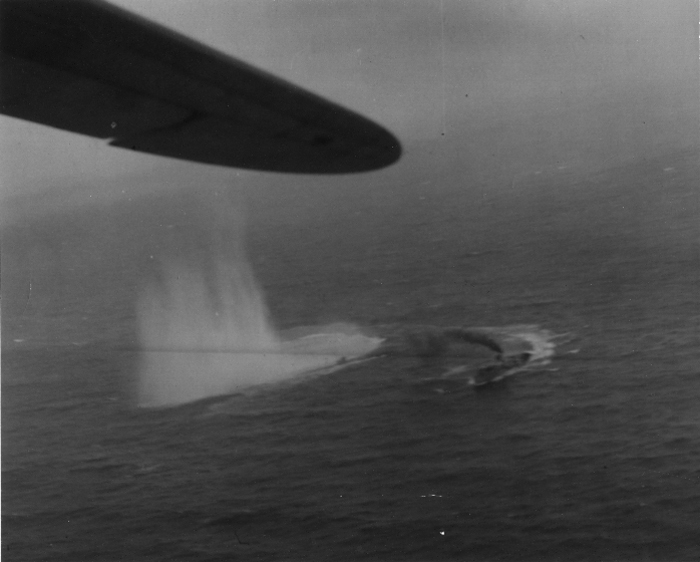
U-135 under attack on 15 July 1943.

For her last patrol, she left Lorient on 7 June 1943. Northeast of the West Indies, she attacked and damaged Twickenham on the 15th. She then moved to the east Atlantic where she was attacked by the sloop HMS Rochester, the corvettes HMS Mignonette and Balsam and a US PBY Catalina flying boat of VP-92. U-135 was sunk east of the Canary Islands on 15 July. Five men died, there were 41 survivors.

=== Wolfpacks ===
U-135 took part in ten wolfpacks, namely:

- Zieten (6 – 20 January 1942)
- Westwall (2 – 12 March 1942)
- York (12 – 25 March 1942)
- Pfadfinder (21 – 27 May 1942)
- Lohs (17 August - 20 September 1942)
- Panzer (23 November - 11 December 1942)
- Raufbold (11 – 19 December 1942)
- Pfeil (3 – 8 February 1943)
- Neptun (18 – 28 February 1943)
- Trutz 2 (22 – 29 June 1943)

== Summary of raiding history ==
Date	Name	Nationality	Tonnage (GRT)	Fate
22 January 1942	Gandia	Belgium	9,626	Sunk
17 May 1942	Fort Qu Appelle	United Kingdom	7,127	Sunk
18 June 1942	Pleassantville	Norway	4,549	Sunk
15 July 1943	Twickenham	United Kingdom	4,762	Damaged

== Bibliography ==
- Busch, Rainer; Röll, Hans-Joachim (1999). German U-boat commanders of World War II : a biographical dictionary. Translated by Brooks, Geoffrey. London, Annapolis, Md: Greenhill Books, Naval Institute Press. ISBN 1-55750-186-6.
- Busch, Rainer; Röll, Hans-Joachim (1999). Deutsche U-Boot-Verluste von September 1939 bis Mai 1945 [German U-boat losses from September 1939 to May 1945]. Der U-Boot-Krieg (in German). Vol. IV. Hamburg, Berlin, Bonn: Mittler. ISBN 3-8132-0514-2.
- Gröner, Erich; Jung, Dieter; Maass, Martin (1991). U-boats and Mine Warfare Vessels. German Warships 1815–1945. Vol. 2. Translated by Thomas, Keith; Magowan, Rachel. London: Conway Maritime Press. ISBN 0-85177-593-4.
- Gannon, Michael (1990). Operation Drumbeat - the dramatic true story of Germany's first U-boat attacks along the American coast in World War II. Harper and Row. pp. 200, 442. ISBN 978-0-06-016155-2.
- Kemp, Paul (1999). U-Boats Destroyed - German Submarine Losses in the World Wars. London: Arms & Armour. ISBN 1-85409-515-3.
