= German submarine U-553 =

German World War II submarine

History

Nazi Germany
- Name: U-553
- Ordered: 25 September 1939
- Builder: Blohm & Voss, Hamburg
- Yard number: 529
- Laid down: 21 November 1939
- Launched: 7 November 1940
- Commissioned: 23 December 1940
- Fate: Missing since 20 January 1943.

General characteristics
- Class & type: Type VIIC submarine
- Displacement: 769 tonnes (757 long tons) surfaced; 871 t (857 long tons) submerged
- Length: 67.10 m (220 ft 2 in) o/a; 50.50 m (165 ft 8 in) pressure hull
- Beam: 6.20 m (20 ft 4 in) o/a; 4.70 m (15 ft 5 in) pressure hull
- Height: 9.60 m (31 ft 6 in)
- Draught: 4.74 m (15 ft 7 in)
- Installed power: 2,800–3,200 PS (2,100–2,400 kW; 2,800–3,200 bhp) (diesels); 750 PS (550 kW; 740 shp) (electric)
- Propulsion: 2 shafts; 2 × diesel engines; 2 × electric motors
- Speed: 17.7 knots (32.8 km/h; 20.4 mph) surfaced; 7.6 knots (14.1 km/h; 8.7 mph) submerged
- Range: 8,500 nmi (15,700 km; 9,800 mi) at 10 knots (19 km/h; 12 mph) surfaced; 80 nmi (150 km; 92 mi) at 4 knots (7.4 km/h; 4.6 mph) submerged
- Test depth: 230 m (750 ft); Crush depth: 250–295 m (820–968 ft)
- Complement: 4 officers, 40–56 enlisted
- Armament: 5 × 53.3 cm (21 in) torpedo tubes (four bow, one stern); 14 × torpedoes or 26 TMA mines; 1 × 8.8 cm (3.46 in) deck gun (220 rounds); 1 x 2 cm (0.79 in) C/30 AA gun

Service record
- Part of: 7th U-boat Flotilla; 23 December 1940 – 30 November 1942; 3rd U-boat Flotilla; 1 December 1942 – 20 January 1943
- Identification codes: M 23 789
- Commanders: Kptlt. / K.Kapt. Karl Thurmann; 23 December 1940 – 20 January 1943
- Operations: 10 patrols: 1st patrol: 19 April – 2 May 1941; 2nd patrol: 7 June – 19 July 1941; 3rd patrol: 7 August – 16 September 1941; 4th patrol: 7 – 22 October 1941; 5th patrol: 1 January – 3 February 1942; 6th patrol: 24 February – 1 April 1942; 7th patrol: 19 April – 24 June 1942; 8th patrol: 19 July – 17 September 1942; 9th patrol: 23 November – 18 December 1942; 10th patrol: 16 – 20 January 1943
- Victories: 12 merchant ships sunk (61,390 GRT); 1 warship sunk (925 tons); 2 merchant ships damaged (15,273 GRT)

German submarine U-553 was a Type VIIC U-boat built for Nazi Germany's Kriegsmarine for service during World War II.

== Design ==
German Type VIIC submarines were preceded by the shorter Type VIIB submarines. U-553 had a displacement of 769 tonnes (757 long tons) when at the surface and 871 tonnes (857 long tons) while submerged. She had a total length of 67.10 m (220 ft 2 in), a pressure hull length of 50.50 m (165 ft 8 in), a beam of 6.20 m (20 ft 4 in), a height of 9.60 m (31 ft 6 in), and a draught of 4.74 m (15 ft 7 in). The submarine was powered by two Germaniawerft F46 four-stroke, six-cylinder supercharged diesel engines producing a total of 2,800 to 3,200 metric horsepower (2,060 to 2,350 kW; 2,760 to 3,160 shp) for use while surfaced, two Brown, Boveri & Cie GG UB 720/8 double-acting electric motors producing a total of 750 metric horsepower (550 kW; 740 shp) for use while submerged. She had two shafts and two 1.23 m (4 ft) propellers. The boat was capable of operating at depths of up to 230 metres (750 ft).

The submarine had a maximum surface speed of 17.7 knots (32.8 km/h; 20.4 mph) and a maximum submerged speed of 7.6 knots (14.1 km/h; 8.7 mph). When submerged, the boat could operate for 80 nautical miles (150 km; 92 mi) at 4 knots (7.4 km/h; 4.6 mph); when surfaced, she could travel 8,500 nautical miles (15,700 km; 9,800 mi) at 10 knots (19 km/h; 12 mph). U-553 was fitted with five 53.3 cm (21 in) torpedo tubes (four fitted at the bow and one at the stern), fourteen torpedoes, one 8.8 cm (3.46 in) SK C/35 naval gun, 220 rounds, and a 2 cm (0.79 in) C/30 anti-aircraft gun. The boat had a complement of between forty-four and sixty.

== Service history ==
U-553 was one of eight Type VIIC submarines ordered from Blohm & Voss on 25 September 1939. Her keel was laid down on 21 November 1939, by Blohm & Voss at their Hamburg shipyard, as yard number 529. She was launched on 7 November 1940 and commissioned on 23 December, with Kapitänleutnant Karl Thurmann in command. He was captain for her entire career.

Her service began with training under the 7th U-boat Flotilla and moved on to operations on 1 April 1941. She then transferred to the 3rd flotilla on 1 December 1942. She was a member of ten wolfpacks. She moved from Kiel in Germany to Bergen in Norway in April 1941.

=== First patrol ===
The boat departed Bergen on 19 April 1941 and headed for the Atlantic via the gap between the Faeroe and Shetland Islands. She arrived at her new base of St. Nazaire in occupied France on 2 May 1941 after suffering serious engine trouble.

=== Second patrol ===
Departing St. Nazaire on 7 June, she achieved success north of the Azores, by sinking the Susan Maersk (she went down in 90 seconds) and the Ranella (she broke in two) both on 12 June 1941.

=== Third, fourth and fifth patrols ===
Her next three sorties met with mixed fortune; her third patrol saw no success, despite ranging far and wide over the north Atlantic.

U-553's next foray saw her attack merchantmen such as the Silvercedar, (sunk on 15 October 1941) and HMS Gladiolus (sunk on 17 October).

The boat's fifth patrol took her toward the eastern Canadian/US coast where she succeeded in damaging the Diala on 15 January 1942 and sinking the Innerøy on 22 January.

=== Sixth and seventh patrols ===
The boat's sixth patrol took her from St. Nazaire as far north as the Faeroe Islands. It was uneventful.

Outing number seven saw the submarine penetrate the Gulf of St. Lawrence where she sank two ships; the Leto and the Nicoya. The Mattawin was sent to the bottom of the Atlantic.

=== Eighth patrol ===
The boat's eighth patrol began with her departure from St. Nazaire on 19 July and to which she returned on 17 September after 61 days at sea, her longest. In that time, she damaged the Belgian Soldier off Newfoundland and attacked three other ships near Cuba, one of which, the Empire Bede, was subsequently scuttled by gunfire from HMS Pimpernel.

=== Ninth patrol ===
Her last full patrol commenced on 23 November 1942; she sank the Charles L D on 9 December 1942. She returned to France, but this time La Pallice on 18 December.

=== Loss ===
Her tenth and final patrol began with her departure from La Pallice on 16 January 1943. On the 20th, she sent a radio message: "Sehrohr unklar" (periscope unready for action), and was never heard from again, most probably having sank because of technical problems. She was officially declared missing in action on 28 January 1943. U-553 had suffered no casualties to her crew until lost with all hands.

=== Wolfpacks ===
U-553 took part in ten wolfpacks, namely:

- West (13 – 20 June 1941)
- Grönland (10 – 23 August 1941)
- Kurfürst (23 August – 2 September 1941)
- Seewolf (2 – 13 September 1941)
- Zieten (6 – 22 January 1942)
- Westwall (2 – 12 March 1942)
- York (12 – 26 March 1942)
- Pirat (29 July – 3 August 1942)
- Draufgänger (29 November – 11 December 1942)
- Landsknecht (19 – 20 January 1943)

== Summary of raiding history ==
Date	Ship Name	Nationality	Tonnage (Note: Merchant ship tonnages are in gross register tons. Military vessels are listed by tons displacement.)	Fate
12 June 1941	Ranella	Norway	5,590	Sunk
12 June 1941	Susan Maersk	United Kingdom	2,355	Sunk
15 October 1941	Ila	Norway	1,583	Sunk
15 October 1941	Silvercedar	United Kingdom	4,354	Sunk
17 October 1941	HMS Gladiolus	Royal Navy	925	Sunk
15 January 1942	Diala	United Kingdom	8,106	Damaged
22 January 1942	Innerøy	Norway	8,260	Sunk
12 May 1942	Leto	Netherlands	4,712	Sunk
12 May 1942	Nicoya	United Kingdom	5,364	Sunk
2 June 1942	Matawin	United Kingdom	6,919	Sunk
3 August 1942	Belgian Soldier	Belgium	7,167	Damaged
18 August 1942	Blankaholm	Sweden	2,845	Sunk
18 August 1942	Empire Bede	United Kingdom	6,959	Sunk
18 August 1942	John Hancock	United States	7,176	Sunk
9 December 1942	Charles L D	United Kingdom	5,273	Sunk

== U-553 in fiction ==
Neal Stephenson's novel Cryptonomicon includes a fictitious U-553 which runs aground about ten miles north of Qwghlm, a fictional pair of islands, Inner Qwghlm and Outer Qwghlm, off the northwestern coast of Great Britain.

== Bibliography ==
- Blair, Clay (2000). Hitler's U-Boat War: The Hunted 1942–1945. New York: Modern Library. ISBN 0-679-64033-9.
- Busch, Rainer; Röll, Hans-Joachim (1999). German U-boat commanders of World War II : a biographical dictionary. Translated by Brooks, Geoffrey. London, Annapolis, Md: Greenhill Books, Naval Institute Press. ISBN 1-55750-186-6.
- Busch, Rainer; Röll, Hans-Joachim (1999). Deutsche U-Boot-Verluste von September 1939 bis Mai 1945 [German U-boat losses from September 1939 to May 1945]. Der U-Boot-Krieg (in German). Vol. IV. Hamburg, Berlin, Bonn: Mittler. ISBN 3-8132-0514-2.
- Gröner, Erich; Jung, Dieter; Maass, Martin (1991). U-boats and Mine Warfare Vessels. German Warships 1815–1945. Vol. 2. Translated by Thomas, Keith; Magowan, Rachel. London: Conway Maritime Press. ISBN 0-85177-593-4.
- Kemp, Paul (1997). U-Boats Destroyed - German Submarine Losses in the World Wars. Arms & Armour. ISBN 1-85409-515-3.
- Niestlé, Axel (2014). German U-Boat Losses During World War II: Details of Destruction. Barnsley, UK: Frontline Books. ISBN 978-1-84832-210-3.
- Wynn, Kenneth (1998). U-Boat Operations of the Second World War: Volume 2: Career Histories, U511–UIT25. London: Chatham Publishing. ISBN 1-86176-069-8.
