= German submarine U-754 =

German World War II submarine

History

Nazi Germany
- Name: U-754
- Ordered: 9 October 1939
- Builder: Kriegsmarinewerft Wilhelmshaven
- Yard number: 137
- Laid down: 8 January 1940
- Launched: 5 July 1941
- Commissioned: 28 August 1941
- Fate: Sunk on 31 July 1942

General characteristics
- Class & type: Type VIIC submarine
- Displacement: 769 tonnes (757 long tons) surfaced; 871 t (857 long tons) submerged
- Length: 67.10 m (220 ft 2 in) o/a; 50.50 m (165 ft 8 in) pressure hull
- Beam: 6.20 m (20 ft 4 in) o/a; 4.70 m (15 ft 5 in) pressure hull
- Height: 9.60 m (31 ft 6 in)
- Draught: 4.74 m (15 ft 7 in)
- Installed power: 2,800–3,200 PS (2,100–2,400 kW; 2,800–3,200 bhp) (diesels); 750 PS (550 kW; 740 shp) (electric)
- Propulsion: 2 shafts; 2 × diesel engines; 2 × electric motors
- Speed: 17.7 knots (32.8 km/h; 20.4 mph) surfaced; 7.6 knots (14.1 km/h; 8.7 mph) submerged
- Range: 8,500 nmi (15,700 km; 9,800 mi) at 10 knots (19 km/h; 12 mph) surfaced; 80 nmi (150 km; 92 mi) at 4 knots (7.4 km/h; 4.6 mph) submerged
- Test depth: 230 m (750 ft); Crush depth: 250–295 m (820–968 ft)
- Complement: 4 officers, 40–56 enlisted
- Armament: 5 × 53.3 cm (21 in) torpedo tubes (four bow, one stern); 14 × torpedoes; 1 × 8.8 cm (3.46 in) deck gun (220 rounds); 1 x 2 cm (0.79 in) C/30 AA gun

Service record
- Part of: 5th U-boat Flotilla; 28 August – 30 November 1941; 1st U-boat Flotilla; 1 December 1941 – 31 July 1942
- Identification codes: M 46 656
- Commanders: Kptlt. Hans Oestermann; 28 August 1941 – 31 July 1942
- Operations: 3 patrols: 1st patrol: 30 December 1941 – 9 February 1942; 2nd patrol: 7 March – 25 April 1942; 3rd patrol: 19 June – 31 July 1942
- Victories: 13 merchant ships sunk (55,659 GRT); 1 merchant ship damaged (490 GRT)

German submarine U-754 was a Type VIIC U-boat deployed by Nazi Germany's Kriegsmarine during the Second World War against allied shipping in the Atlantic Ocean. She was a successful but short-lived boat, sinking 13 ships during her career. She was most notorious for her final attack, in which she shelled and sank the small fishing vessel Ebb, and killed a number of its crew with machine-gun fire as they attempted to launch a life raft. She was sunk with all hands by a Royal Canadian Air Force bomber three days later on 31 July 1942.

U-754 was built in the Kriegsmarinewerft at the main fleet base of Wilhelmshaven in Northern Germany on the North Sea. She was completed on 28 August 1941, and given to the experienced Kapitänleutnant Hans Oestermann to command. Following her work-up period in which the boat was tested and the crew trained, she was despatched on her first patrol.

== Design ==
German Type VIIC submarines were preceded by the shorter Type VIIB submarines. U-754 had a displacement of 769 tonnes (757 long tons) when at the surface and 871 tonnes (857 long tons) while submerged. She had a total length of 67.10 m (220 ft 2 in), a pressure hull length of 50.50 m (165 ft 8 in), a beam of 6.20 m (20 ft 4 in), a height of 9.60 m (31 ft 6 in), and a draught of 4.74 m (15 ft 7 in). The submarine was powered by two Germaniawerft F46 four-stroke, six-cylinder supercharged diesel engines producing a total of 2,800 to 3,200 metric horsepower (2,060 to 2,350 kW; 2,760 to 3,160 shp) for use while surfaced, two Garbe, Lahmeyer & Co. RP 137/c double-acting electric motors producing a total of 750 metric horsepower (550 kW; 740 shp) for use while submerged. She had two shafts and two 1.23 m (4 ft) propellers. The boat was capable of operating at depths of up to 230 metres (750 ft).

The submarine had a maximum surface speed of 17.7 knots (32.8 km/h; 20.4 mph) and a maximum submerged speed of 7.6 knots (14.1 km/h; 8.7 mph). When submerged, the boat could operate for 80 nautical miles (150 km; 92 mi) at 4 knots (7.4 km/h; 4.6 mph); when surfaced, she could travel 8,500 nautical miles (15,700 km; 9,800 mi) at 10 knots (19 km/h; 12 mph). U-754 was fitted with five 53.3 cm (21 in) torpedo tubes (four fitted at the bow and one at the stern), fourteen torpedoes, one 8.8 cm (3.46 in) SK C/35 naval gun, 220 rounds, and a 2 cm (0.79 in) C/30 anti-aircraft gun. The boat had a complement of between forty-four and sixty.

== Service history ==
=== First patrol ===
U-754 departed Kiel on her first patrol on 30 December 1941, and her operating area was primarily in the mouth of the St Lawrence River, operating against convoys entering or leaving the waterway, or destined for the many ports at the river's mouth, such as Halifax, Nova Scotia or St. John's, Newfoundland. During this patrol, she sank four freighters. The submarine narrowly escaped a bombing attack by a Royal Canadian Air Force Bolingbroke bomber on 23 March which inflicted minor damage. The submarine returned to Brest in France on 2 February to resupply and rearm.

=== Second patrol ===
The second patrol left from Brest on 9 March 1942, and after a brief sweep in her previous area of operations, she swung south to take advantage of the Second happy time then occurring off the United States's Eastern Seaboard. During this patrol she sank seven more ships; three of them in one attack on a small coastal convoy, in which she hit several small barges and coastal cargo ships. She sank the tanker British Prudence by torpedo on 23 March. U-754 returned to Brest on 25 April 1942.

=== Third patrol ===
Her final patrol was her least successful, in terms of ships sunk, although the tonnage was higher, as she sunk the 12,435 GRT Waiwera in the mid-Atlantic on 29 June, ten days after leaving Brest.

==== Attack on Ebb ====
It was nearly a month later, on 28 July, that U-754 scored her final victim, when she controversially shelled the fishing vessel Ebb near Cape Sable Island, Nova Scotia.

Ebb was a motor fishing trawler operating out of Boston for the General Sea Foods Company. The crew of the small 260 GRT vessel felt it was unlikely that they would be troubled by the war, as she was far too small for an effective torpedo shot, and too insignificant to justify the risk of a surface attack by gunfire. On 28 July 1942, however, while fishing off Cape Sable her crew were shocked to see U-754 emerge from the water.

The submarine immediately opened fire without warning on Ebb with her anti-aircraft guns. The ship stopped and made signals that they had surrendered, but the gunfire continued, one gun sweeping through the crowd of crew members attempting to launch the ship's life raft. Five of the seventeen crew were killed and seven more seriously wounded, before Ebb sank after taking over fifty hits. The survivors were discovered and rescued by the W-class destroyer HMS Witherington fourteen hours later.

Had U-754's crew survived the war, it is possible that they would have been charged with war crimes as were the officers of U-852 who also fired on sailors who had abandoned their ship. Similar incidents of gun attacks aimed at crews occurred on the U-247 and U-552.

==== RCAF attack and sinking ====
Radio transmissions from U-754 betrayed a pattern to Royal Canadian Navy intelligence, information which was used by Norville Everett Small the commander of RCAF 113 Squadron to deploy patrols from RCAF Station Yarmouth targeting the suspected position of U-754.

On 31 July, a Hudson bomber piloted by Squadron Leader Small himself caught U-754 on the surface south of Yarmouth not far from the scene of the Ebb sinking. The submarine was precisely straddled by a cluster of depth charges as it began to dive. The conning tower of the wounded submarine briefly surfaced to be strafed by the Hudson's machine guns before submerging for the last time.

A trail of large air bubbles was followed by a massive underwater explosion as U-754 went to the bottom with all 43 hands. It marked the first submarine kill of the RCAF's Eastern Air Command.

=== Wolfpacks ===
U-754 took part in one wolfpack, namely:

- Zieten (6 – 22 January 1942)

== Summary of raiding history ==
Date	Ship Name	Nationality	Tonnage (GRT)	Fate
21 January 1942	Belize	Norway	2,153	Sunk
21 January 1942	William Hansen	Norway	1,344	Sunk
25 January 1942	Mount Kitheron	Greece	3,876	Sunk
26 January 1942	Icarion	Greece	4,013	Sunk
23 March 1942	British Prudence	United Kingdom	8,620	Sunk
31 March 1942	Menominee	United States	441	Sunk
31 March 1942	Ontario	United States	490	Damaged
31 March 1942	Barnegat	United States	914	Sunk
31 March 1942	Alleghany	United States	914	Sunk
1 April 1942	Tiger	United States	5,992	Sunk
3 April 1942	Otho	United States	4,839	Sunk
6 April 1942	Kollskeg	Norway	9,858	Sunk
29 June 1942	Waiwera	United Kingdom	12,435	Sunk
28 July 1942	Ebb	United States	260	Sunk

== Bibliography ==
- Busch, Rainer; Röll, Hans-Joachim (1999). German U-boat commanders of World War II : a biographical dictionary. Translated by Brooks, Geoffrey. London, Annapolis, Md: Greenhill Books, Naval Institute Press. ISBN 1-55750-186-6.
- Busch, Rainer; Röll, Hans-Joachim (1999). Der U-Boot-Krieg, 1939-1945: Deutsche U-Boot-Verluste von September 1939 bis Mai 1945 [German U-boat losses from September 1939 to May 1945] (in German). Vol. IV. Hamburg, Berlin, Bonn: Mittler. ISBN 3-8132-0514-2.
- Gröner, Eric; Jung, Dieter; Maass, Martin (1991). German Warships 1815-1945: U-boats and Mine Warfare Vessels. Vol. 2. Translated by Thomas, Keith; Magowan, Rachel. London: Conway Maritime Press. ISBN 0-85177-593-4.
- Sharpe, Peter (1998). U-Boat Fact File. Great Britain: Midland Publishing. ISBN 1-85780-072-9.
- Bridgland, Tony, Waves of Hate, Leo Cooper, Great Britain: 2002. ISBN 0-85052-822-4.
