= USS Iona (YT-107) =

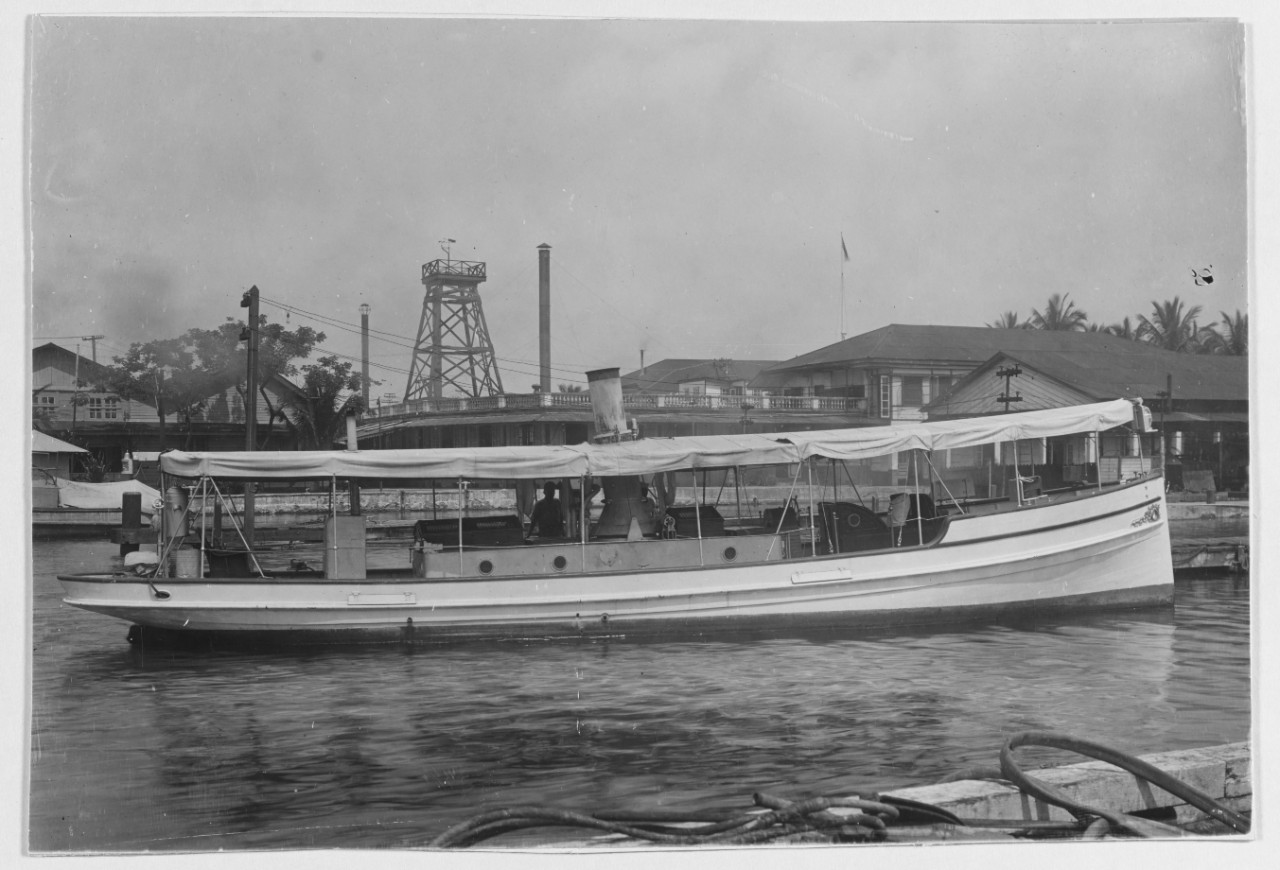
- USS Iona (YT-107) at Cavite Navy Yard, Philippines

History

Spain
- Name: Unknown
- Fate: seized by the United States, 1898

United States
- Name: Iona
- Namesake: Iona
- Acquired: captured by United States Navy, 1898
- Commissioned: 1898
- Honours and awards: Spanish Campaign Medal; American Defense Service Medal; Asiatic-Pacific Campaign Medal; World War II Victory Medal; Philippine Defense Medal
- Fate: sunk, 3 January 1942

General characteristics
- Type: Harbor tug
- Tonnage: 107 GRT
- Length: 56 ft (17 m) o/a
- Beam: 10.25 ft (3.12 m)
- Draught: 5.67 ft (1.73 m)
- Installed power: 125 hp (93 kW)
- Propulsion: steam, single screw

USS Iona (YT-107) was a wooden-hulled, harbor tug of the United States Navy that served during World War II.

== History ==
She was seized by the United States at the Cavite Navy Yard in 1898 sometime after the Battle of Manila Bay from Spain during the Spanish–American War. Her original name, place of building, date of origin, and classification are unknown. In 1898, she was christened USS Iona, commissioned the United States Navy, and assigned to the Cavite Navy Yard, 16th Naval District, United States Asiatic Fleet. On 17 July 1920, she was designated as District Harbor Tug YT-107. She is believed to have been destroyed in an air raid at Cavite Navy Yard during the Japanese occupation of the Philippines on 3 January 1942.
