= Japanese minesweeper Banshu Maru No. 52 =

- Japanese auxiliary minesweeper Banshu Maru No. 52

History

Empire of Japan
- Name: Banshu Maru No. 52
- Builder: Mitsubishi Zosen Kobe Zosensho
- Laid down: 4 September 1921
- Launched: 5 November 1921
- Sponsored by: Hayashikane Shoten
- Completed: 28 November 1921
- Acquired: requisitioned by Imperial Japanese Navy, 15 October 1940
- Decommissioned: 31 March 1944
- Stricken: 5 February 1942
- Identification: 28262
- Fate: Sunk after hitting mine, 20 January 1942
- Notes: Call sign: JDKA

General characteristics
- Tonnage: 234 GRT
- Length: 37.19 m (122 ft 0 in) o/a
- Beam: 6.93 m (22 ft 9 in)
- Draught: 3.96 m (13 ft 0 in)
- Installed power: 550 bhp (410 kW)

Banshu Maru No. 52 (Japanese: 第五十二播州丸) was an auxiliary minesweeper of the Imperial Japanese Navy during World War II.

== History ==
She was laid down on 4 September 1921 at the Kobe shipyard of Mitsubishi Zosen Kobe Zosensho at the behest of shipping company, Hayashikane Shoten as Banshu Maru No.2. She was launched on 5 November 1921 and completed 28 November 1921. Registered in the port of Shimonoseki, she operated as a fishing trawler. On 14 September 1939, she was renamed Banshu Maru No. 52. On 15 October 1940, she was requisitioned by the Imperial Japanese Navy and converted to an auxiliary minesweeper under Reserve Lieutenant (Junior Grade) Kubo Tadahiko (久保忠彦) and assigned to Auxiliary Minesweeper division 3 (AM Div 3). Kubo served until 1 December 1941 when he was replaced by Reserve Lieutenant (Junior Grade) Uchida Shoji (内田正二) and assigned to Auxiliary Minesweeper division 46 (AM Div 46), Bako Guard District. On 24 December 1941, she departed Sasebo, Nagasaki for Magong, Taiwan and then on to Subic Bay arriving on 17 January 1942. She commenced mine sweeping activities in Subic Bay during the Battle of Bataan despite facing artillery fire from the shore. Gunboats Aso Maru (阿蘇丸) and Nampo Maru (南浦丸) were assigned to the area to suppress additional fire and allow the minesweeper to continue with its activities.

On 20 January 1942, she struck a mine and sank in Subic Bay, Luzon, Philippines (14°45′N 120°17′E). She was removed from the Navy List on 5 February 1942. Her wreck is a popular dive site.
