= USS Dapdap =

United States Navy ship

History

United States
- Name: USS Dapdap
- Namesake: Previous name retained
- Acquired: 1908
- Stricken: 24 July 1942
- Home port: Naval Station, Cavite, Philippine Islands
- Honours and awards: 1 Battle Stars; American Defense Service Medal; Asiatic-Pacific Campaign Medal; World War II Victory Medal; Philippine Defense Medal
- Fate: Lost to Japanese forces

General characteristics
- Type: Working launch
- Length: 71 feet
- Beam: 13 feet
- Propulsion: one 150 horsepower engine

USS Dapdap (YFB-684) was a United States Navy working launch in service from 1908 to 1942.

== History ==
Dapdap (YFB-684), a working launch, was attached to the United States Asiatic Fleet at Naval Station, Cavite, Philippine Islands, or the 16th Naval District from 1908 to 1942.

Dapdap was lost, 2 January 1942, to Japanese forces during the conquest of Luzon Island. She earned one battle star.

She was stricken from the Navy List on 24 July 1942.
