= U-boat campaign =

WWI German naval campaign to attack Allied trade routes (1914–18)

- Part of the naval theatre of World War I
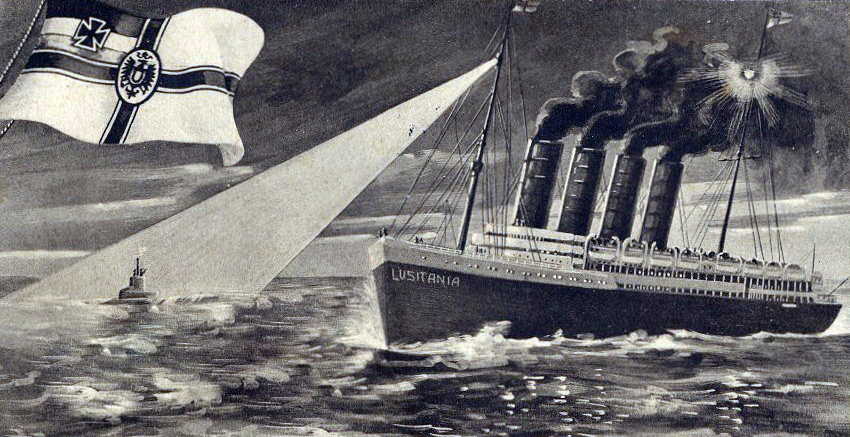
- A German postcard depicting the U-boat SM U-20 sinking RMS Lusitania
Date	28 July 1914 – 11 November 1918 (4 years, 3 months and 2 weeks)
Location	Atlantic Ocean, North Sea, Mediterranean Sea, Black Sea
Result	Allied victory

Belligerents
Royal Navy (Canada) Royal Canadian Navy; French Navy; Regia Marina; United States Navy; Imperial Japanese Navy; Brazilian Navy; Imperial Russian Navy; Royal Romanian Navy	Imperial German Navy; Austro-Hungarian Navy; Bulgarian Navy

Commanders and leaders
(United Kingdom of Great Britain and Ireland) Lord Fisher (United Kingdom of Great Britain and Ireland) Sir Henry Jackson (United Kingdom of Great Britain and Ireland) Sir John Jellicoe (United Kingdom of Great Britain and Ireland) Sir Rosslyn Wemyss	(German Empire) Hugo von Pohl (German Empire) Gustav Bachmann (German Empire) Henning von Holtzendorff (German Empire) Reinhard Scheer

Strength
~500 Royal Navy destroyers ~250 US destroyers Various armed trawlers and smaller vessels Defensively armed merchant ships 366 Q-ships	351 U-boats

Casualties and losses
5,000 merchant ships sunk 15,000 merchant sailors killed 104 warships sunk 42 warships damaged 61 Q-ships sunk	217 U-boats lost to all causes 6,000 sailors killed

The U-boat campaign from 1914 to 1918 was the World War I naval campaign fought by German U-boats against the trade routes of the Allies, largely in the seas around the British Isles and in the Mediterranean, as part of a mutual blockade between the German Empire and the United Kingdom.

Both Germany and Britain relied on food and fertilizer imports to feed their populations, and raw materials to supply their war industry. The British Royal Navy was superior in numbers and could operate on most of the world's oceans because of the British Empire, whereas the Imperial German Navy surface fleet was mainly restricted to the German Bight, and used commerce raiders and submarine warfare to operate elsewhere.

German U-boats sank almost 5,000 ships with over 12 million gross register tonnage, losing 178 boats and about 5,000 men in combat. The Allies were able to keep a fairly constant tonnage of shipping available, due to a combination of ship construction and countermeasures, particularly the introduction of convoys.

== 1914: Initial campaign ==
=== North Sea: Initial stage ===
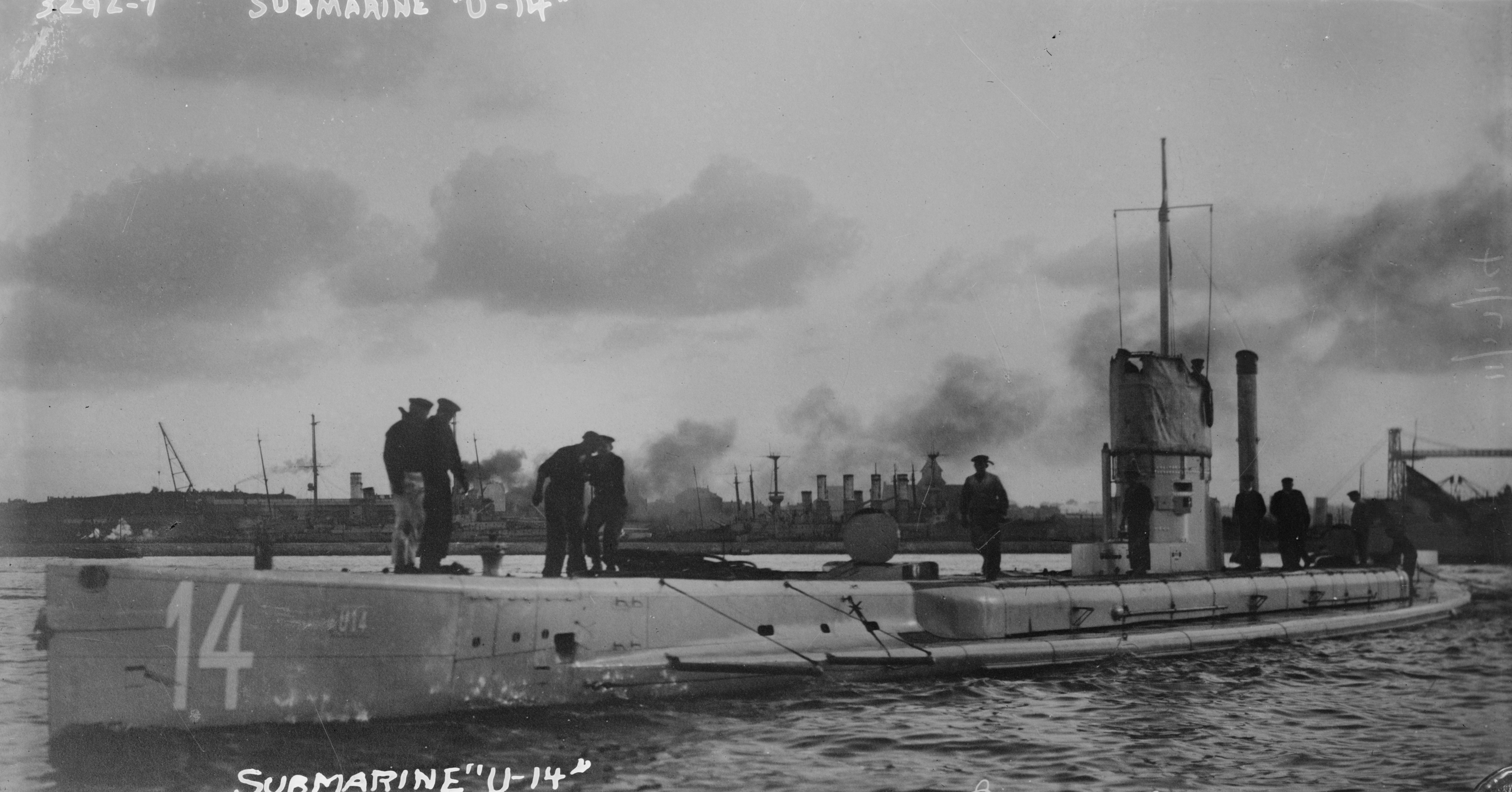
German U-boat U-14

In August 1914, a flotilla of ten U-boats sailed from their base in Heligoland to attack Royal Navy warships in the North Sea in the first submarine war patrol in history. Their aim was to sink capital ships of the British Grand Fleet, and so to reduce the Grand Fleet's numerical superiority over the German High Seas Fleet. The first sortie was not a success. One of SM U-9's engines broke down and she had to return to Heligoland. Only one attack was carried out, when U-15 fired a torpedo (which missed) at HMS Monarch. Two of the ten U-boats were lost.

Later in the month, the U-boats achieved success, when U-21 sank the cruiser HMS Pathfinder. In September, SM U-9 sank three armoured cruisers (Aboukir, Hogue, and Cressy) in a single action. Other successes followed. In October U-9 sank the cruiser Hawke and U-27 sank the submarine E3, the first time one submarine sank another, and on the last day of the year SM U-24 sank the pre-dreadnought battleship Formidable. By the end of the initial campaign, the U-boats had sunk nine warships while losing five of their own number.

Due to fears of submarine attack, the Grand Fleet spent much of the first year dispersed on the West coast, while their home base at Scapa Flow had defenses installed.

=== Mediterranean Initial stage ===
The initial phase of the U-boat campaign in the Mediterranean comprised the actions by the Austro-Hungarian Navy's U-boat force against the French, who were blockading the Straits of Otranto. At the start of hostilities, the Austro-Hungarian Navy had seven U-boats in commission; five operational, two training; all were of the coastal type, with limited range and endurance, suitable for operation in the Adriatic. However during the war new larger U-boats came into service plus Germany shipped several overland. The Austro-Hungarian U-boats had a number of successes. On 21 December 1914 U-12 torpedoed the French battleship Jean Bart (beyond Otranto), causing her to retire to Malta for serious repairs, and on 27 April 1915 U-5 sank the French cruiser Léon Gambetta, with a heavy loss of life.

=== Submarine against warships ===
While U-boats could sink a large and expensive armored warship with one torpedo, they needed to be in position before an attack took place. Their fastest speed, while surfaced, of around 15 knots, was less than the cruising speed of most warships and only two-thirds that of the most modern dreadnoughts. Their chief advantage was to submerge, because surface ships had no means to detect a submarine underwater, and no means to attack. However, while submerged, the U-boat was virtually blind and immobile, as early submarines had limited underwater speed and endurance.

The U-boats scored a number of impressive successes early in the war, but warships adopted tactics to counter them. Whilst warships were traveling at speed and on an erratic zigzag course they were relatively safe, and for the remainder of the war, the U-boats were unable to mount a successful attack on a warship traveling in this manner.

Overall, the German Navy was unable to erode the Grand Fleet's advantage as hoped. In the two main surface actions of this period, the U-boat was unable to have any effect, and the High Seas Fleet was unable to draw the Grand Fleet into a U-boat trap.

=== First attacks on merchant ships ===
The first attacks on merchant ships had started in October 1914. At that time there was no plan for a concerted U-boat offensive against Allied trade. It was recognised that the U-boat had several drawbacks as a commerce raider, and such a campaign risked alienating neutral opinion. In the six months to the opening of the commerce war in February 1915, U-boats had sunk 19 ships, totalling 43,000 GRT.

== 1915: War on commerce ==
=== Unrestricted submarine warfare ===
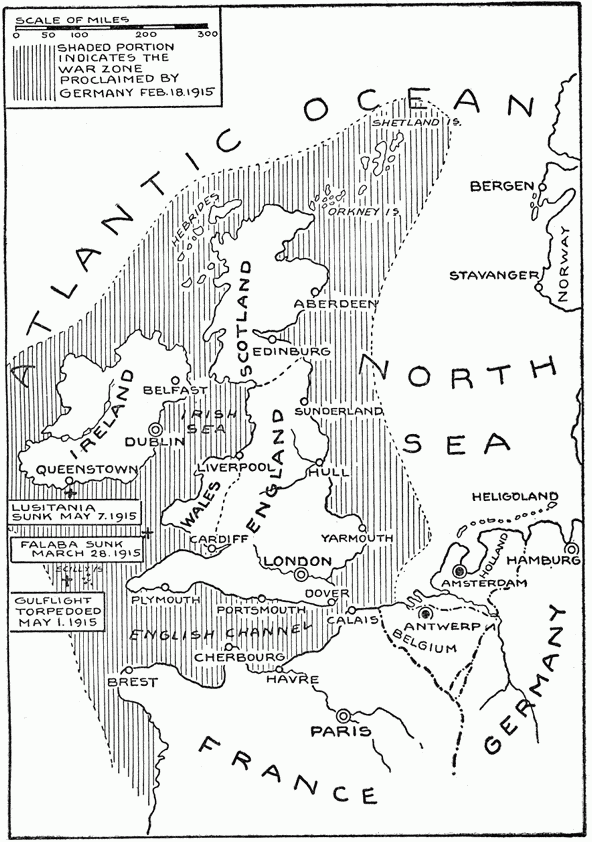
Shaded area shows "War Zone" announced by Germany on 4 February 1915

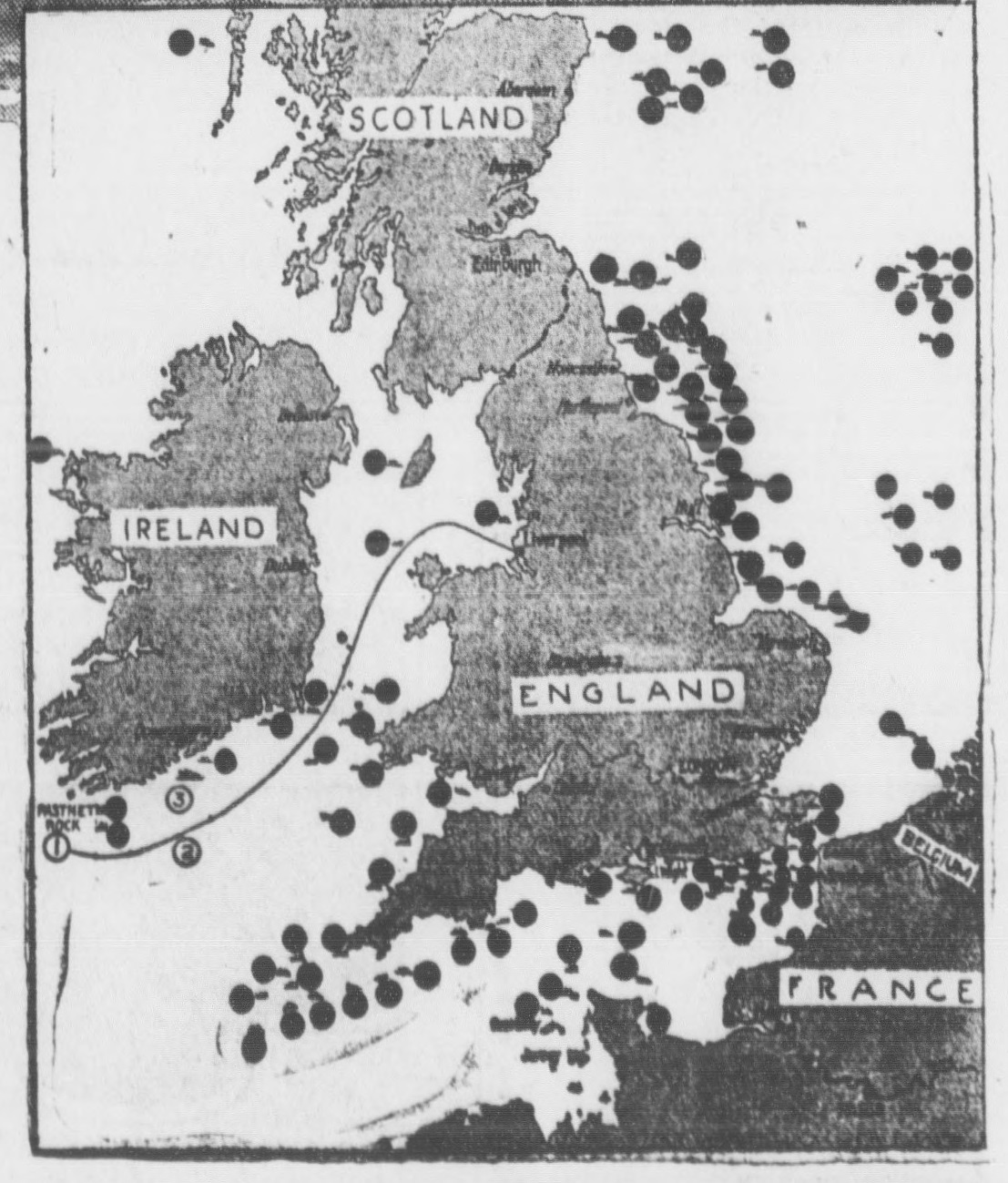
1915 Map of German Operations

Because Germany could not possibly deal with British naval strength on an even basis, the German navy was relatively inactive at the start of the war, yet eager to demonstrate a role for itself. Throughout 1914, figures like Hermann Bauer, Alfred von Tirpitz and Hugo von Pohl argued that submarine commerce raiding provided a means of quickly defeating Britain. Perhaps influenced by the appearance of submarines in fiction, naval officials proposed extremely optimistic views of how effective even a very a small U-boat (with as few as 4–20 vessels) blockade could be. Such views were readily taken up by the German public, as by early 1915, all the combatants had lost the illusion that the war could be won quickly, and began to consider harsher measures in order to gain an advantage.

The British, with their overwhelming sea power, had established a naval blockade of Germany immediately on the outbreak of war in August 1914, and in early November 1914 declared the North Sea to be a "Military Area". Any ships entering were advised to pass through specific lanes (inspected by the British) or risk striking a growing array of minefields. While the word "blockade" was avoided in official pronouncements, this amounted to unprecedented restrictions on trade with the Central Powers, with even food considered "absolute contraband of war". Though at this point Germany was still receiving sufficient imports from neutral countries, Germans regarded this as a blatant attempt to starve the German people into submission and wanted to retaliate in kind, and in fact the severity of the British blockade did not go over well in America either. This gave the Germans the pretext to act. The German Chancellor, Theobald von Bethmann Hollweg, felt that such a submarine blockade, based on "shoot without warning", would simply antagonise the United States and other neutrals and have little chance of achieving its objectives. However, he was unable to hold back the pressures for taking such a step. The Chancellor and the Admiralty came to an agreement on 1 February and directives were sent out the next day.

On 4 February 1915 Admiral Hugo von Pohl, commander of the German High Seas Fleet and Head of the Admiralty Staff until 1 Feb, published a warning in the Deutscher Reichsanzeiger (Imperial German Gazette):

(1) The waters around Great Britain and Ireland, including the whole of the English Channel, are hereby declared to be a War Zone. From February 18 onwards every enemy merchant vessel encountered in this zone will be destroyed, nor will it always be possible to avert the danger thereby threatened to the crew and passengers.

(2) Neutral vessels also will run a risk in the War Zone, because in view of the hazards of sea warfare and the British authorization of January 31 of the misuse of neutral flags, it may not always be possible to prevent attacks on enemy ships from harming neutral ships.

(3) Navigation to the north of Shetland, in the eastern parts of the North Sea and through a zone at least thirty nautical miles wide along the Dutch coast is not exposed to danger.

Von Pohl breached protocol by acting without proper consultation with the Kaiser and the other naval offices, but the Germans were now bound to the strategy to avoid political embarrassment. The measure was subject to fierce internal debate amongst the German government as neutral nations and the Kaiser reacted strongly negatively, and a compromise was put in place whereby neutral shipping (which the admiralty wished to attack as well) would be spared. In a February 12 directive, von Pohl's replacement as Admiralty Chief Gustav Bachmann however noted that enemy passenger vessels should be deliberately targeted, so as to create a "shock effect".

Though the Germans had only 21 submarines available, not all of which were operational, they were now primarily based at Ostend in Belgium, giving the submarines better access to the sea lanes around England. In January, before the declaration of "unrestricted submarine warfare" as the submarine blockade was called, 43,550 tonnes of shipping had been sunk by U-boats. The number of sinkings then steadily increased, with 168,200 tonnes going down in August. Attacking sometimes without warning, German U-boats sank nearly 100,000 GRT per month, an average of 1.9 ships daily. The economic and military effect was however, virtually nothing. Britain alone had around 20 million GRT in shipping at the start of the war and production managed to keep pace with losses.

On 10 April 1915 the British steamer Harpalyce, a Belgian relief ship and clearly marked as such, was torpedoed without warning by SM UB-4 near the North Hinder lightship, just outside the strip of sea declared safe by von Pohl. The ship had been en route for America to collect food for starving Belgians, and its sinking outraged US citizens already unhappy at the death of Leon C. Thrasher, drowned when U-28 sank Falaba on 28 March 1915.

=== RMS Lusitania ===
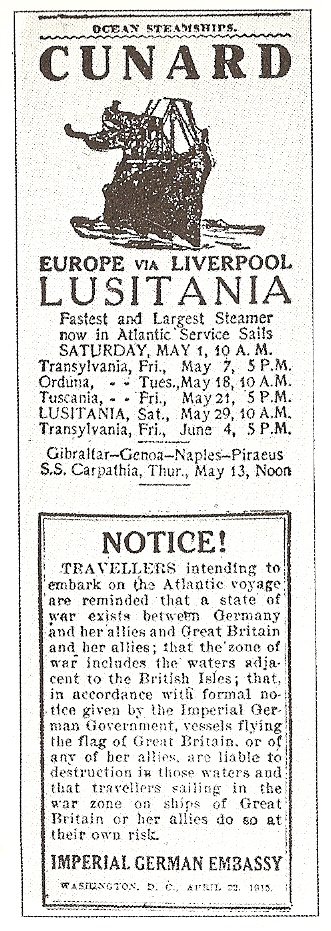
General warning issued by Imperial German Embassy, appearing coincidentally alongside an advert for the Lusitania, published a day before the ship sailed.

On 7 May 1915, the liner RMS Lusitania was torpedoed by U-20, 13 mi (21 km) off the Old Head of Kinsale, Ireland, and sank in just 18 minutes. Of the 1,960 people aboard, 1,197 were killed, 124 of them Americans.

Following the incident, the German government attempted to justify it with a range of arguments. This only exacerbated the massive outrage in Britain and America. U.S. President Woodrow Wilson refused to overreact, though some believed the massive loss of life caused by the sinking of Lusitania required a firm response from the United States.

When Germany began its U-boat campaign against Britain, Wilson had warned that the United States would hold the German government strictly accountable for any violations of American rights. Backed by State Department second-in-command Robert Lansing, Wilson made his position clear in three notes to the German government issued on 13 May, 9 June, and 21 July.

The first note affirmed the right of Americans to travel as passengers on merchant ships of any nationality. As the Germans claimed it was impossible to use submarines "without an inevitable violation of many sacred principles of justice and humanity", it called for the Germans to abandon submarine warfare against commercial vessels, whatever flag they sailed under.

In the second note Wilson rejected German defenses, rebutting some false claims and asserting that all that mattered was that the Lusitania did not defend herself, but was attacked without warning in such a way that endangered innocent civilian lives. Secretary of State William Jennings Bryan considered Wilson's second note too provocative and resigned in protest after failing to have it moderated.

The third note, of 21 July, issued an ultimatum, to the effect that the United States would regard any subsequent sinkings that harm American citizens as "deliberately unfriendly", but signaling an acceptance of submarine warfare under cruiser rules. While the American public and leadership were not ready for war, a rule on what is acceptable and what is not had been set as a result of the sinking.

=== Submarine minelayers ===
The appearance of new minefields off the east coast of Britain in June 1915 puzzled the Royal Navy due to the waters being very busy, and was blamed initially on neutral fishing boats. However, on 2 July the small coaster Cottingham accidentally ran down the small coastal U-boat UC-2 off Great Yarmouth, and when she was salvaged she was found to be a submarine minelayer, fitted with twelve mines in six launching chutes.

On 21 August UC-5 became the first submarine minelayer to penetrate into the English Channel, laying 12 mines off Boulogne, one of which sank the steamship William Dawson the same day. UC-5 laid 6 more mines off Boulogne and Folkestone on 7 September, one of which sank the cable layer Monarch. Further mines were laid off the southeast coast by UC-1, UC-3, UC-6, and UC-7.

=== SS Arabic and a pause in unrestricted warfare ===
On 19 August 1915, U-24 sank the White Star liner SS Arabic, outward bound for America, 50 mi (80 km) south of Kinsale. He fired a single torpedo which struck the liner aft, and she sank within 10 minutes, with the loss of 44 passengers and crew, 3 of whom were American. Following speculation that the US would sever relations with Germany, on 28 August the Chancellor issued new orders to submarine commanders and relayed them to Washington. The new orders stated that until further notice, all passenger ships could only be sunk after warning and the saving of passengers and crews. On September 1 the unrestricted submarine warfare doctrine was essentially abandoned. This proved unacceptable to the Naval High Command, and on 18 September the High Seas flotillas were withdrawn from the commerce war.

=== Dardanelles Operations ===
The German Navy sent their first submarines to the Mediterranean in response to the Anglo-French Dardanelles campaign, after it became obvious that their Austro-Hungarian allies could do little against it with their small submarine force, which nevertheless was successful in defending the Adriatic. The first U-boats sent, U-21 and the two small coastal boats, UB-7 and UB-8, achieved initial success, U-21 sinking the Royal Navy pre-dreadnought battleships HMS Triumph and HMS Majestic on 25 and 27 May, respectively, on her way to Constantinople, but ran into severe limitations in the Dardanelles, where swarms of small craft and extensive anti-submarine netting and booms restricted their movements.

By the end of June 1915, the Germans had assembled a further three prefabricated Type UB I submarines at Pola, two of which were to be transferred to the Austro-Hungarian Navy. They were also assembling three Type UC I minelaying submarines, which were ordered converted into transports to carry small quantities of critical supplies to Turkey.

=== Mediterranean operations ===
The Mediterranean was an attractive theater of operations to the German Naval Command; a significant proportion of British imports passed through it, it was critical to French and Italian trade, and submarines would be able to operate effectively in it even in autumn and winter when poor weather hampered Atlantic and North Sea operations. Additionally, there were certain choke points through which shipping had to pass, such as the Suez Canal, Malta, Crete, and Gibraltar. Finally, the Mediterranean offered the advantage that fewer ships of neutral powers (such as the US or Brazil) would be encountered.

Throughout the summer, the German navy assembled a force of 4 U-boats at Cattaro for operations against commerce in the Mediterranean. The campaign got underway in October 1915, when U-33 and U-39, followed later by U-35, were ordered to attack the approaches to Salonika and Kavalla. That month, 18 ships were sunk, for a total of 63,848 tons. It was decided the same month that further reinforcements were called for, and the large U-boat, U-38 sailed for Cattaro. Since Germany was not yet at war with Italy, even though Austria was, German U-boats were ordered to refrain from attacking Italian shipping in the eastern Mediterranean. When operating in the west, up to the line of Cape Matapan, German U-boats flew the Austrian flag, and a sinking without warning policy was adopted, since large merchant ships could be attacked on the suspicion of being transports or auxiliary cruisers.

The German Admiralty also decided that the Type UB II submarine would be ideal for Mediterranean service. Since these were too large to be shipped in sections by rail to Pola like the Type UB I, the materials for their construction and German workers to assemble them were sent instead. This meant a shortage of workers to complete U-boats for service in home waters, but it seemed justified by the successes in the Mediterranean in November, when 44 ships were sunk, for a total of 155,882 tons. The total in December fell to 17 ships (73,741 tons) which was still over half the total tonnage sunk in all theaters of operation at the time.

In November 1915, U-38 caused a diplomatic incident when she sank the Italian steamer SS Ancona while sailing under the Austrian flag, and the loss of nine American citizens caused the "sinking without warning" policy to be suspended in April 1916 until the resumption of unrestricted submarine warfare in 1917. A similar incident in March 1916 became a contributing factor in Italy's decision to declare war on Germany in August 1916.

=== Early countermeasures ===
Allied countermeasures during this period had mixed success. The navy advised merchant vessels on evading U-boats: to zig-zig, to keep away from the shore, to turn away and run from spotted submarines if possible, or to turn towards submarines in front of them to force them to submerge. A system of defensively armed merchant ships were also employed with stern mounted guns to discourage pursuit by U-boats operating on the surface. Such defensive measures were the most effective.

Offensive measures were less effective. From arming ships for self-defence, the next step was arming ships for the purpose of seeking out and engaging the U-boats in gun battles; two U-boats were sunk in 1915 whilst attacking trawlers so fitted. The following step was to arm and man ships with hidden guns to bait in submarines, the so-called Q ship. A variant on the idea was to equip small vessels with a submarine escort. In 1915, two U-boats were sunk by Q-ships, and two more by submarines accompanying trawlers. Once the Germans became aware of these tactics, successes were much less common.

Efforts were made to use nets to find submerged U-boats, and explosive sweeps to destroy them, but these were largely failures. Attempts were also made to close routes like the Straits of Dover with boom nets and minefields, the so-called Dover Barrage; to lay minefields around U-boat bases, and station submarines on patrol to catch them leaving or entering port. These measures required a huge expenditure of effort and material, but met with little success for the time being. Though eventually mines would be one of the most common causes of U-boat loss, only two U-boats were sunk by these measures in 1915.

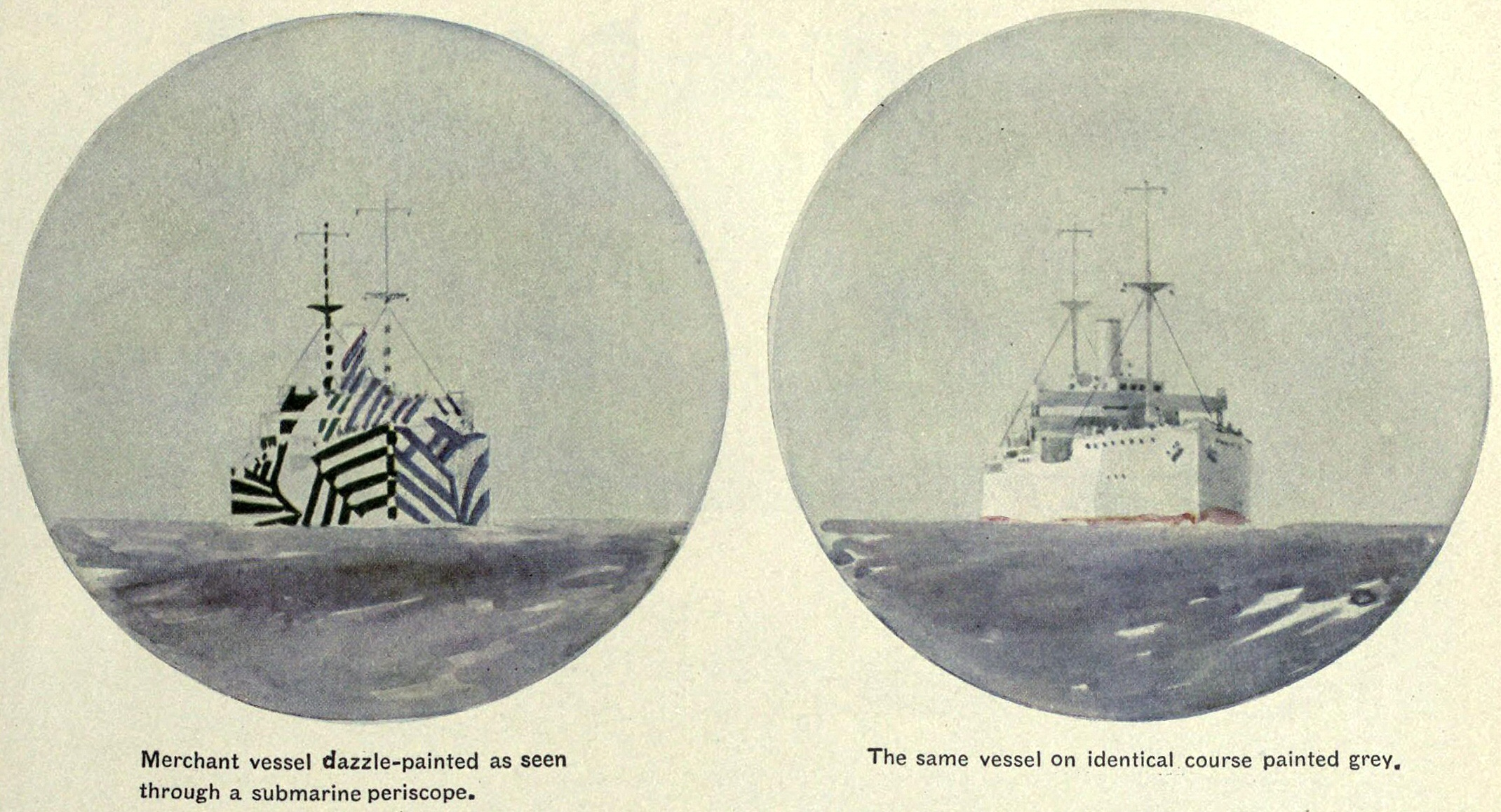
Claimed effectiveness: Artist's conception of a U-boat commander's periscope view of a merchant ship in dazzle camouflage (left) and the same ship uncamouflaged (right), Encyclopædia Britannica, 1922. The conspicuous markings obscure the ship's heading.

In 1917 Britain and in 1918 America also adopted dazzle camouflage to attempt to reduce shipping losses to torpedoes. The results in both cases were inconclusive.

The biggest obstacle to early German efforts was simply the small size of the submarine fleet relative to their task. At the beginning of this period the British Merchant Marine had a shipping fleet totaling of 21 million GRT. In six months of unrestricted submarine warfare U-boats sank 750,000 tons of Allied shipping, scarcely denting the British merchant fleet; whilst new building, and additions from ships seized, had more than made up for this loss. On the other hand, serious offence had been given to neutrals such as Norway and the Netherlands, and brought the United States to the brink of war. This failure, and the various restrictions imposed on the U-boat Arm in the Atlantic area largely brought the campaign there to a halt, although it continued with little hindrance in the Mediterranean and elsewhere, where there was less likelihood of offending neutrals.

=== Depth charges ===
The depth charge, or "dropping mine" as it was initially named, was first mooted in 1910, and developed into practicality when the British Royal Navy's Commander in Chief, Admiral of the Fleet Sir George Callaghan, requested its production in 1914. Design work was carried out by Herbert Taylor at HMS Vernon Torpedo and Mine School in Portsmouth, England, and the first effective depth charge, the "Type D", became available in January 1916.

Anti-submarine vessels initially carried only two depth charges, to be released from a chute at the stern of the ship. The first success was the sinking of U-68 off County Kerry, Ireland, on 22 March 1916 by the Q-ship Farnborough. Germany became aware of the depth charge following unsuccessful attacks on U-67 on 15 April 1916, and U-69 on 20 April. UC-19 and UB-29 were the only other submarines sunk by depth charges during 1916.

== 1916: The High Seas Fleet; Mediterranean, American, Arctic and Black Sea waters ==
=== In support of the High Seas Fleet ===
In 1916 the German Navy again tried to use the U-boats to erode the Grand Fleet's numerical superiority; they staged operations to lure the Grand Fleet into a U-boat trap. Because the U-boats were much slower than the battle fleet, these operations required U-boat patrol lines to be set up in advance; then the battle fleet manoeuvred to draw the Grand Fleet onto them.

Several of these operations were staged, in March and April 1916, but with no success. Ironically, the major fleet action which did take place, the Battle of Jutland, in May 1916, saw no U-boat involvement at all; the fleets met and engaged largely by chance, and there were no U-boat patrols anywhere near the battle area. A further series of operations, in August and October 1916, were similarly unfruitful, and the strategy was abandoned in favor of resuming commerce warfare.

The British were well aware of the risk of U-boat traps to the Grand Fleet, although they had no means of knowing where these might lie. However Jellicoe had developed a tactical response to the problem (which, in the event, was never tested). Faced with a German fleet that turned away, he would assume a submarine trap, and decline to follow, but would move at high speed to the flank, before deploying or opening fire; the aim of this would be to fight the battle away from the ground chosen by his enemy, and forcing any U-boats present to surface if they intended to follow.

=== Mediterranean waters ===
During 1916 the commerce war continued in the Mediterranean, albeit under cruiser rules after April 24 due to the Sussex incident. Allied countermeasures were largely ineffective; the complex arrangements for co-operation between the various navies meant a fragmented and unco-ordinated response, while the main remedy favored by the Allies for the U-boat menace, the Otranto Barrage, was of little value.

Just two U-boats were caught in the barrage in all the time it was in operation; meanwhile merchant shipping suffered huge losses. In 1916 the Allies lost 415 ships, of 1,045,058 GRT, half of all Allied ships sunk in all theatres.

Eight of the top dozen U-boat aces served in the Pola flotilla, including the highest scoring commander of all, Lothar von Arnauld de la Perière.

=== American waters ===
In 1916 the Germans completed two submarine merchant vessels, to be used as blockade runners. The aim was to use them to carry high value goods to neutral nations such as the US, which still maintained a strict neutrality, and was prepared to trade with Germany as with any other nation. The first of these vessels, Deutschland, sailed in summer 1916 and made a favorable impact on US public opinion. She made a second equally successful voyage in autumn of that year. Her sister, Bremen, was less fortunate; she disappeared on her maiden voyage, the cause of her loss unknown.

A less favorable impression was made by the cruise of U-53 under K/L Hans Rose. After refuelling at Newport, Rhode Island, Rose raided Allied shipping off the coast of Canada and the United States. Although this was in international waters, and Rose scrupulously followed international law, the action was seen as an affront to the US, particularly when US warships were forced to stand aside while merchant ships nearby were sunk.

=== Arctic waters ===
In autumn 1916, U-boats of the High Seas flotilla attacked shipping bound for Russia. Five U-boats operated in the Barents Sea between North Cape and the Kola inlet. Also, the two UE1-class minelaying boats laid minefields in the White Sea. These boats sank 34 ships (19 of them Norwegian) before winter ice closed the area for operations.

One of the ships sunk near the Norwegian coast was the Romanian merchant Bistrița, sunk by U-43 on 11 November. Before sinking the ship, the captain of the U-boat allowed the ship's crew to take refuge in his submarine, then later he handed over the crew to a Russian sailing ship which took them to Vardø. From there, they were eventually repatriated.

=== Black Sea waters ===
The Constantinople Flotilla was established in May 1915 and operated U-boats in the Black Sea. Bulgaria joined the campaign in May 1916, when the German submarine UB-8 was commissioned by the Bulgarian Navy as Podvodnik. In three years of operation, the Flotilla sank ships totalling 117,093 GRT.

UB-45 was lost in November 1916 and UB-46 in December, both sunk by Russian mines. In addition, UB-7 was reportedly sunk by Russian aircraft in October.

Throughout September and October 1916, the main task of the submarines UB-42 and UB-14 was patrolling the Russian and Romanian coasts, from Constanța to Sevastopol. On 30 September 1916, near the port of Sulina, UB-42 launched a torpedo at the Romanian torpedo boat Smeul, but missed. The Romanian warship counterattacked, damaging the submarine's periscope and conning tower and forcing her to retreat. In November, the German submarine UC-15 was sent on a minelaying mission off Sulina and never returned, being sunk by her own mines. This was probably caused by an encounter with Smeul, whose captain surprised a German submarine near Sulina in November 1916, the latter reportedly never returning to her base at Varna, Bulgaria. This could only be UC-15, whose systems most likely malfunctioned after being forced to submerge in the shallow waters, upon encountering the Romanian torpedo boat.

=== Internal German debate ===
During 1916, continual and fierce debate took place within the German government between advocates and opponents of unrestricted submarine warfare, the latter led by Chancellor Bethmann Hollweg. As the military opposed commerce warfare under cruiser rules, a number of options for an intensified campaign was suggested and in some cases briefly implemented:

- Allowing attacks without warning on armed merchant ships
- Allowing attacks without warning only on British merchant ships (but not passenger vessels)
- Allowing attacks without warning in a close proximity to the British isles.

In March, Grand Admiral Tirpitz, a key early supporter of submarine warfare, was removed from his post, but the disagreement continued unabated. The Admiralty pushed for no restrictions whatsoever. In particular, after the Sussex Pledge, High Seas fleet commander Scheer adopted an all or nothing approach, refusing to contemplate using his submarines in a limited campaign.

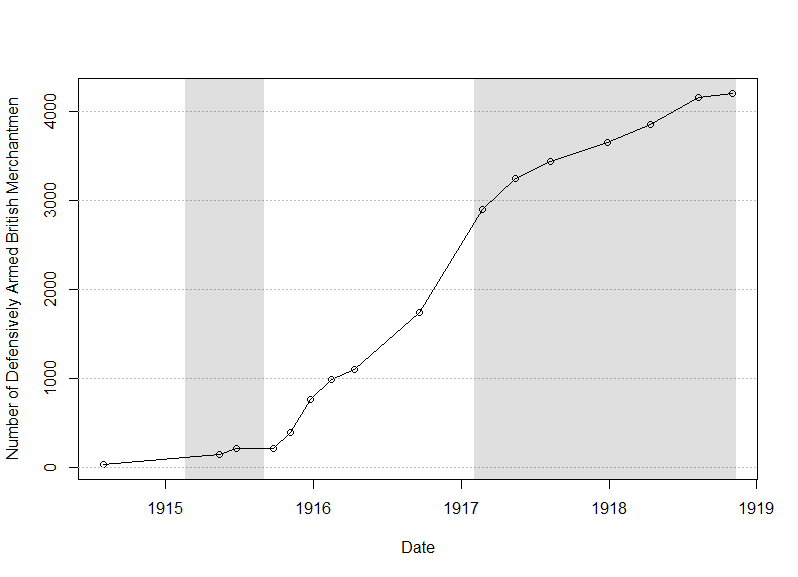
Graph showing the increasing numbers of British defensively armed merchant ships. Shaded areas are periods of unrestricted submarine warfare.

However, when Atlantic submarines were finally out into action under cruiser rules in October, they were an immediate success, sinking an average of 350,000 tons per month, over twice what had been managed during unrestricted submarine warfare in 1915. This was despite a large increase in the number of defensively armed British merchantmen, aimed at reducing the effectiveness of surface attacks. Yet, the political tides had begun to shift strongly towards the supporters of an unlimited submarine war.

== 1917: Resumption of unrestricted submarine warfare ==
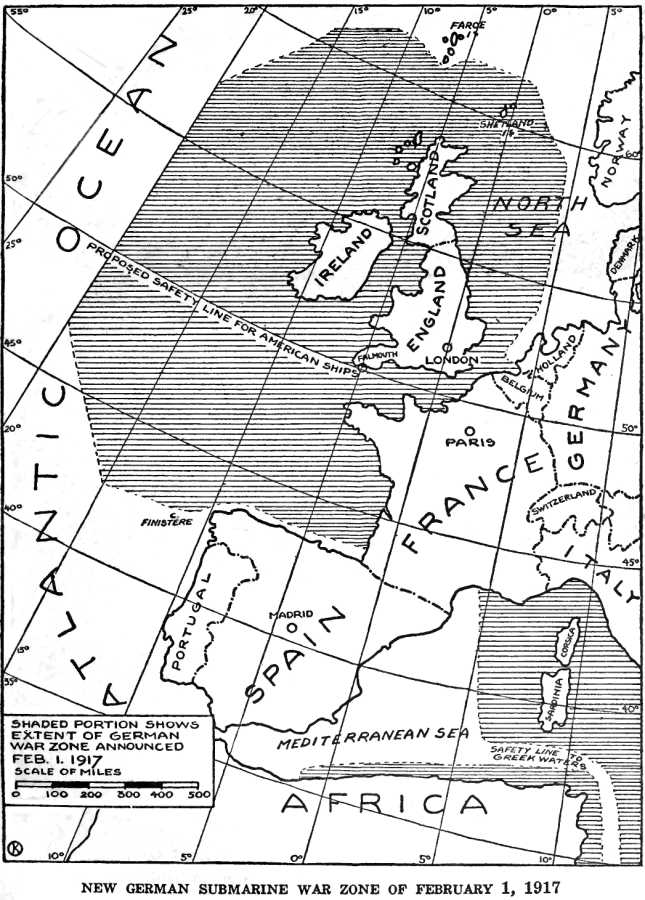
The shaded areas show the unrestricted submarine warfare zone announced by Germany on 1 February 1917

On 22 December 1916, Admiral von Holtzendorff composed a memorandum which became the pivotal document for Germany's resumption of unrestricted U-boat warfare in 1917. Holtzendorff proposed breaking Britain's back by sinking 600,000 tons of shipping per month, based on a February 1916 study by Richard Fuss, who had postulated that if merchant shipping was sunk at such a rate, Britain would run out of shipping and be forced to sue for peace within six months, well before the Americans could act. Even if the "disorganized and undisciplined" Americans did intervene, Holtzendorff assured the Kaiser, "I give your Majesty my word as an officer, that not one American will land on the Continent."

On 9 January 1917, the Kaiser met with Chancellor Bethmann Hollweg and military leaders at Schloss Pless to discuss measures to resolve Germany's increasingly grim war situation; its military campaign in France had bogged down, and with Allied divisions outnumbering German ones by 190 to 150, there was a real possibility of a successful Allied offensive. Meanwhile, the German navy was bottled up in its home port of Kiel, and the British blockade had caused a food scarcity that was in turn causing deaths due to malnutrition. The military staff urged the Kaiser to unleash the submarine fleet on shipping travelling to Britain, Hindenburg advising the Kaiser that "The war must be brought to an end by whatever means as soon as possible." On 31 January, the Kaiser duly signed the order for unrestricted submarine warfare to resume effective 1 February; Bethmann Hollweg, who had opposed the decision, said "Germany is finished".

On 27 January, Admiral Beatty observed that "The real crux lies in whether we blockade the enemy to his knees, or whether he does the same to us."

Germany had 105 submarines ready for action on 1 February: 46 in the High Seas Fleet; 23 in Flanders; 23 in the Mediterranean; 10 in the Baltic; and 3 at Constantinople. Fresh construction ensured that, despite losses, at least 120 submarines would be available for the rest of 1917. The campaign was initially a great success, nearly 500,000 tons of shipping being sunk in both February and March, and 860,000 tons in April, when Britain's supplies of wheat shrank to six weeks worth. In May losses exceeded 600,000 tons, and in June 700,000. Germany had lost only nine submarines in the first three months of the campaign.

On 3 February, in response to the new submarine campaign, President Wilson severed all diplomatic relations with Germany, and the US Congress declared war on 6 April.

=== Allied response ===
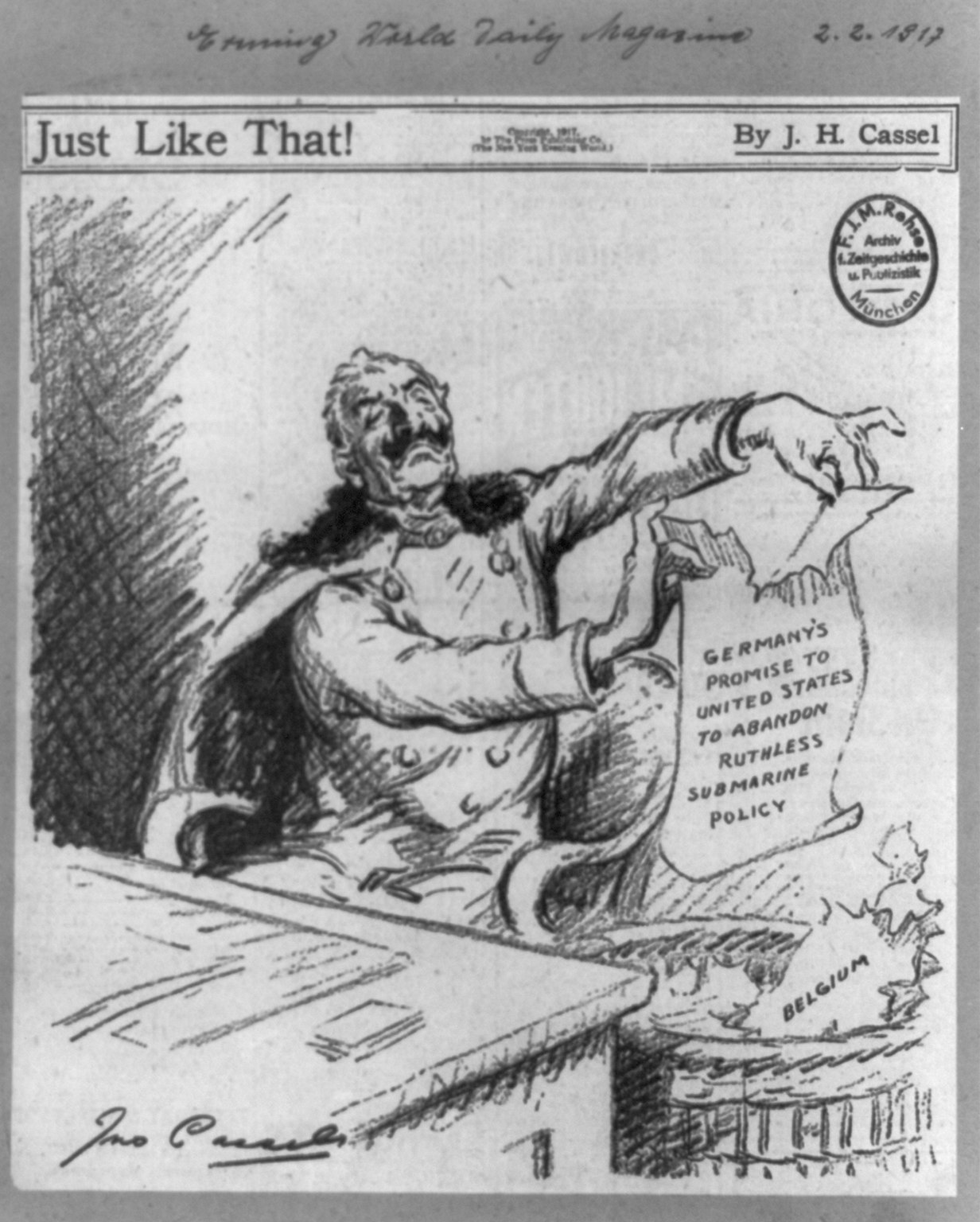
Just like that, cartoon depicting Wilhelm II ripping apart Germany's promise to "abandon ruthless submarine policy"

The new policy of unrestricted submarine warfare was initially a success. In January 1917, prior to the campaign, Britain lost 49 ships; in February, after it opened, 105; and in March, 147. In March a full 25% of all Britain-bound shipping was sunk.

At first, the British Admiralty failed to respond effectively to the German offensive. Despite the proven success of troop convoys earlier in the war, the Channel convoys between England and France, and the Dutch, French, and Scandinavian convoys in the North Sea, they initially refused to consider widespread convoying or escorting. Convoying imposed severe delays on shipping, and was believed to be counterproductive, amounting to a loss of carrying capacity greater than the loss inflicted by the U-boats. It was disliked by both merchant and naval captains, and derided as a defensive measure. It was not until 27 April that the Admiralty endorsed the convoy system, the first convoy sailing from Gibraltar on 10 May.

In April, US Rear Admiral William Sims arrived in London as US Naval Liaison. He was dismayed to be informed by the Admiralty that Germany would win the war if its submarines went unchecked, and cabled Washington to have USN destroyers despatched to Queenstown, Ireland, from where they were to patrol to the west.

As merchantmen from Allied countries were sunk, Brazilian ships took over routes that had been vacated. However, this led the Brazilian vessels into waters patrolled by U-boats. When coupled with Germany's policy of unrestricted submarine warfare, the result was that Brazilian ships were soon lost, which drove the country closer to declaring war on the Central Powers.

In May and June a regular system of transatlantic convoys were established, and after July the monthly losses never exceeded 500,000 tons, although they remained above 300,000 tons for the remainder of 1917. Convoying was an immediate success; on whichever routes it was introduced it resulted in a drop in shipping losses, with the U-boats seeking out easier prey. It also brought warships escorting the convoys in contact with attacking U-boats, leading to an increase in U-boats destroyed. German submarine losses were between 5 and 10 each month, and they soon realised the need to increase production, even at the expense of building surface warships. However, production was delayed by labour and material shortages.

The Allied Maritime Transport Council was established on 3 November 1917, bringing together representatives from the British Empire, the United States, France and Italy to provide an 'international administration' for more efficient management of shipping. This initiative lead the civil action which complemented the naval action in response to the U-boat campaign, and which consisted of the efficient organisation of both shipping and of the distribution of supplies, such that the utility of every ton of imported goods was used to the maximum effectiveness.

== 1918: The last year ==
At the end of 1917 Allied shipping losses stood at over 6 million GRT for the year overall. However monthly shipping losses had dropped to around 300,000 GRT, and never rose to the levels suffered in spring 1917. With the establishment of a comprehensive convoy system, Allied shipping losses fell to non-critical levels, while U-boat losses increased alarmingly. From 48 boats lost in the years up to February 1917, a further 61 were lost by the end of the year.

The logical response to the convoy system, which concentrated forces for the defence, was to similarly concentrate the attacking force. The U-boat arm did not succeed in World War I in developing such a response. Just one attempt was made to operate a group, to mount a pack attack on any convoy encountered; 6 U-boats sailed in May 1918 as a group, commanded by K/L Rucker in U-103. They encountered several home-bound convoys and succeeded in sinking 3 ships, but at the loss of 2 of their number, including U-103, which was rammed by the troopship Olympic. Rucker had found it next to impossible to exercise control from his position at sea, and the loss ratio discouraged any further experiments.

=== U-cruisers ===
Late in the war, the German high command decided to take the submarine war to the coast of the US, using the large Type U-151 and Type U-139 U-boats. The Type U-151 carried 18 torpedoes (24 torpedoes on the Type U-139) and two 150 mm deck guns, and had a range of around 25,000 nautical miles (46,300 km). Seven Type U-151 and three Type U-139 had been built, the Type U-151 originally as large merchant U-boats for shipping material to and from locations otherwise denied German surface ships, such as the United States, and 6 Type U-151 were refitted for war duty in 1917. The Type U-139 were the largest U-boats of World War I.

=== American campaign ===
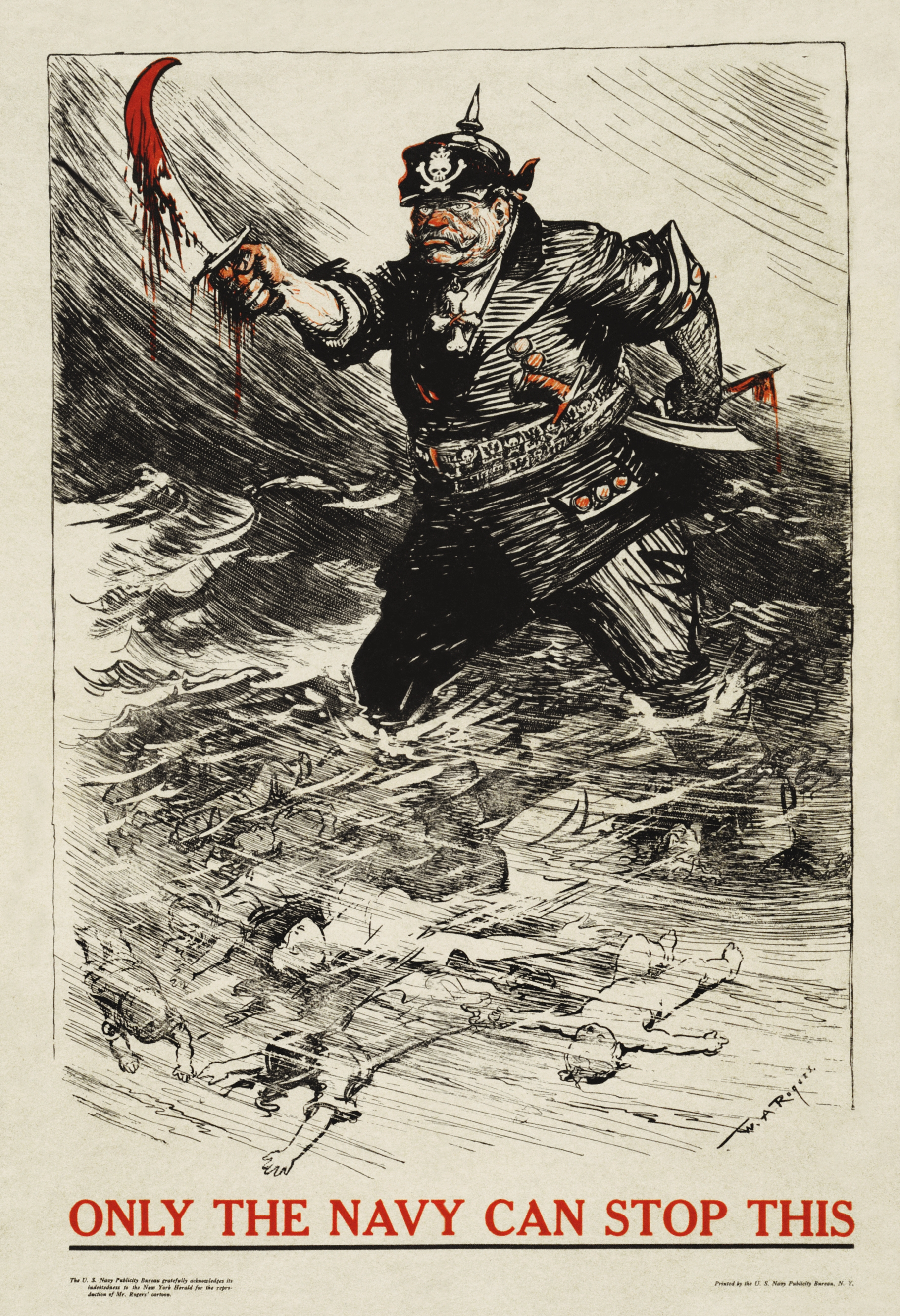
United States Navy recruitment poster

U-151 departed Kiel on 14 April 1918 commanded by Korvettenkapitän Heinrich von Nostitz und Jänckendorff, her mission to attack American shipping. She arrived in Chesapeake Bay on 21 May where she laid mines off the Delaware capes, and cut the submerged telegraph cables which connected New York with Nova Scotia. On 25 May she stopped three US schooners off Virginia, took their crews prisoner, and sank the three ships by gunfire. On 2 June 1918, known to some historians as "Black Sunday", U-151 sank six US ships and damaged two others off the coast of New Jersey in the space of a few hours. The next day the tanker Herbert L. Pratt struck a mine previously laid by U-151 in the area but was later salvaged. Only 13 people died in the seven sinkings, their deaths caused by a capsized lifeboat. She returned to Kiel on 20 July 1918 after a 94-day cruise in which she had covered a distance of 10,915 mi (17,566 km), sunk 23 ships totaling 61,000 tons, and had laid mines responsible for the sinking of another 4 vessels.

Encouraged by the success of U-151, U-156, U-117, and the large Type 139, U-cruisers U-140 were dispatched on similar missions, but the US Navy was now ready for them, and the hunting was not as good. U-156 was lost with all hands on the return voyage when she struck a mine off Bergen, Norway, on 25 September 1918. Another trio of long-range submarines, U-155, U-152, and U-cruiser U-139 were making their way across the Atlantic in November 1918 when the war ended.

A few of the U-cruisers also made long voyages south to the Azores and the African coast, where they operated generally unmolested against shipping operating in the area, though one, U-154, was torpedoed by the British submarine HMS E35 off the coast of Portugal in May 1918.

July 1918 witnessed the Attack on Orleans when a U-boat sunk four barges and a tugboat off the coast of Cape Cod Massachusetts by the town of Orleans. The U-boat fired on the town ineffectually for about an hour before it was fought off by two Navy planes. It was the first attack involving a foreign power's artillery against US soil since the Mexican–American War.

=== Final countermeasures ===
By 1918 the Allied anti-submarine measures had continued to become more effective.

Aircraft began to play an increasingly effective role in patrolling large areas quickly. While they had little effect when attacking (only one U-boat was confirmed as sunk by air attack) the presence of aircraft forced the U-boat to dive, becoming blind and immobile, or risk the air patrol summoning hunting warships to the scene. During 1918 no convoy escorted by air patrol lost a ship, and U-boats were forced increasingly to operate at night or beyond aircraft range.

In 1918 the USN embarked on a mammoth scheme to create a barrage across the routes exiting the North Sea. The North Sea Mine Barrage saw the laying of over 70,000 mines during the summer of 1918. From September to November 1918 6 U-boats were sunk by this measure.

The RN also developed the R-class submarine, designed as a hunter-killer vessel, with a high underwater speed and sophisticated hydrophone system. These came too late to see action, however, and no successes were recorded by them.

By the end of 1918, Allied shipping losses were 2 3/4 million GRT for the year overall (averaging 323,000 tons through March and declining thereafter) at a cost of 69 submarines, the U-boat Arm's worst year.

=== United States Navy in the Atlantic and Mediterranean ===
During the Great War United States Navy warships were deployed to both the Atlantic and Mediterranean with the primary objective of fighting German submarines and escorting convoys. American participation commenced with an event known as the "Return of the Mayflower", when the first six destroyers arrived at Queenstown, Ireland in May 1917. Despite their long journey, when asked when they would be ready to go on patrol, the squadron commander replied "We are ready now". Essentially all available American destroyers and much of the submarine force were deployed in 1917–18, with bases including Queenstown, Bantry Bay, the Azores, and other locations. Many contacts and attacks were made in the Atlantic and Mediterranean, though only two U-boats were sunk or disabled by American action. An American auxiliary cruiser heavily damaged a U-boat during the action of 4 April 1918. As a result, the Germans sailed directly for Spain where they scuttled their boat. American submarine chasers also engaged in one battle against Austro-Hungarian forces during the war. Though their participation in the conflict was intended as a counter-submarine effort, they were engaged by enemy shore batteries, charted a path through a minefield and helped sink two Austro-Hungarian destroyers at the naval base of Durazzo, Albania.

== Japanese participation ==
Beginning in April 1917, Japan, an ally of the United Kingdom, sent a total of 14 destroyers to the Mediterranean with cruiser flagships which were based at Malta and played an important part in escorting convoys to guard them against enemy submarines. The Japanese ships were very effective in patrol and anti-submarine activity. However, of the 9 Austro-Hungarian navy submarines lost to enemy action, 5 were sunk by Italian navy units (U-13, U-10, U-16, U-20, and U-23), 1 by Italian and French units (U-30), 1 by Royal Navy units (U-3), while none were sunk by the Japanese navy, which lost one destroyer (Sakaki, torpedoed by U-27).

== Brazilian participation ==
On 21 December 1917 the British government requested that a Brazilian naval force of light cruisers be placed under Royal Navy control and a squadron comprising the cruisers Rio Grande do Sul and Bahia, the destroyers Paraíba, Rio Grande do Norte, Piauí, and Santa Catarina, and the support ship Belmonte and the ocean-going tug Laurindo Pitta was formed, designated the Divisão Naval em Operações de Guerra ("Naval Division in War Operations"). The DNOG sailed on 31 July 1918 from Fernando de Noronha for Sierra Leone, arriving at Freetown on 9 August, and sailing onwards to its new base of operations, Dakar, on 23 August. On the night of 25 August the division believed it had been attacked by a U-boat when the auxiliary cruiser Belmonte sighted a torpedo track. The purported submarine was depth-charged, fired on, and reportedly sunk by the Rio Grande do Norte, but the sinking was never confirmed.

The DNOG patrolled the Dakar-Cape Verde-Gibraltar triangle, which was suspected to be used by U-boats waiting on convoys, until 3 November 1918 when it sailed for Gibraltar to begin operations in the Mediterranean, with the exception of the Rio Grande do Sul, Rio Grande do Norte, and Belmonte. The Division arrived at Gibraltar on 10 November; while passing through the Straits of Gibraltar, they mistook three USN subchasers for U-boats but no damage was caused.

== Aftermath ==
By mid-1918, U-boat losses had reached unacceptable levels, and the morale of their crews had drastically deteriorated; by the autumn it became clear that the Central Powers could not win the war.

The Allies insisted that an essential precondition of any armistice was that Germany surrender all her submarines, and on 24 October 1918 all German U-boats were ordered to cease offensive operations and return to their home ports. The Allies stipulated that all seaworthy submarines were to be surrendered to them and those in shipyards be broken up. More than 160 U-boats surrendered at Harwich, Essex in November 1918. Overseen by Rear Admiral Sir Reginald Tyrwhitt, commanding officer of the Harwich fleet, the German crews were loaded on to transport ships to be sent home without being allowed to set foot on British soil. Some of the U-boats were sent to places such as Liverpool or Brighton to be put on display whilst others were left on the beach. The last significant role played by U-boats in World War I was the suppression of the German naval mutiny that same month, when they stood ready to "fire without warning on any vessel flying the red flag".

== Summary ==
=== Allied losses ===
Allied and neutral tonnage sunk by U-boats in World War I
Month	1914	1915	1916	1917	1918
January		47,981	81,259	368,521	306,658
February		59,921	117,547	540,006	318,957
March		80,775	167,097	593,841	342,597
April		55,725	191,667	881,027	278,719
May		120,058	129,175	596,629	295,520
June		131,428	108,851	687,507	255,587
July		109,640	118,215	557,988	260,967
August	62,767	185,866	162,744	511,730	283,815
September	98,378	151,884	230,460	351,748	187,881
October	87,917	88,534	353,660	458,558	118,559
November	19,413	153,043	311,508	289,212	17,682
December	44,197	123,141	355,139	399,212	
Total	312,672	1,307,996	2,327,326	6,235,878	2,666,942

Grand Total 12,850,815 gross tons. More than 3000 British civilian ships were sunk with almost 15,000 British merchant sailors killed.

The heaviest losses were suffered after unrestricted submarine warfare was resumed in February 1917, before the British began full-scale convoying in September 1917. 150,000 tons of purely British shipping were lost in January 1917, and 300,000 tons in February; Allied and neutral losses increased in a similar proportion. The worst month for shipping losses was April 1917 when 525,000 tons of British shipping were lost. In that month a total of 881,027 tons were sunk by the U-boats. After convoying began, losses diminished. In October 270,000 tons were lost, and in December 170,000 tons were lost.

Losses were offset by construction. Sir Joseph Maclay, the British Minister of Shipping, approved four standard designs of merchant ship and placed orders for over 1,000,000 tons of shipping (Britain launched 495,000 tons of shipping in the first half of 1917, but 850,000 tons were sunk in the first quarter alone; by 1918 3,000,000 tons a year were being launched). Additional shipping was built by the US after they joined the Allies in April 1917.

Available allied and neutral steamship tonnage (in thousands, GRT)
	British	Allied	USA	Other	Total
1914 June	20,524	3,352	2,070	10,930	36,838
1914 December	20,752	3,396	2,352	11,068	37,569
1915 June	20,866	3,444	2,645	11,074	37,950
1915 December	20,804	3,497	2,756	11,163	38,221
1916 June	20,464	3,537	2,891	11,265	38,157
1916 December	19,900	3,573	3,589	11,220	38,282
1917 June	18,535	3,441	4,213	10,670	36,858
1917 December	17,725	3,189	4,868	10,459	36,241
1918 June	17,415	2,954	6,059	10,286	36,683
1918 December	17,601	2,960	7,977	10,237	38,775

Allied military losses included 10 battleships, 18 cruisers and several smaller naval vessels. Also sunk were 18 hospital ships.

29 U-boat commanders were decorated with the Pour le Mérite, the highest German decoration for gallantry for officers. 12 U-boat crewmen received the Goldene Militär-Verdienst-Kreuz, the highest bravery award for non-commissioned officers and enlisted men. The most successful U-boat commanders of World War I were Lothar von Arnauld de la Perière (189 merchant vessels and two gunboats with 446,708 tons), followed by Walter Forstmann (149 ships with 391,607 tons), and Max Valentiner (144 ships with 299,482 tons). So far, their records have never been surpassed by anyone in any later conflict.

=== U-boat losses ===
According to Clodfelter's encyclopedia of military casualties:

German Submarine Force 1914–1918
	1914	1915	1916	1917	1918
On hand	24	29	54	133	142
Additions (Commissioned)	10	52	108	87	70
Battle losses	5	19	22	63	69
Other losses		8	7	15	9
Years end	29	54	133	142	134

- Total operational boats: 351
- Total sunk in combat: 178 (41 by mines, 30 by depth charges and 13 by Q-ships)
- Other losses: 39
- Completed after Armistice: 45
- Surrendered to Allies: 179
- Men lost in U-boats: 515 officers and 4894 enlisted men

However, different sources give different numbers, as the nature of submarine warfare creates uncertainty. U-boats on patrol frequently just disappear and the cause must then be inferred from the location they sank, reported engagements by Allies, or wreck data if the wreck is found. Uboat.net's listing of u-boat fates gives

- Lost in battle: 72 (34 by surface warships, 17 by allied submarines. The remainder mostly by Q-ships or civilian vessels, with the latter typically employing ramming.)
- Lost due to mines: 58
- Lost on patrol for non-combat reasons: 29
- Lost for unknown reasons: 27
