= SM U-9 (Austria-Hungary) =

SM U-9 (Austria-Hungary) may refer to one of the following World War I German U-boats:

- SM U-68, ordered as U-9, part of the Austro-Hungarian Navy U-7 class; sold to Germany before 1915 launch and became one of the German Type U 66 submarines; sunk in March 1916 during first patrol by British Q ship
- SM UB-3, a German Type UB I submarine that operated in the Mediterranean; co-flagged as the Austro-Hungarian U-boat SM U-9; disappeared May 1915
