= German submarine U-7 =

U-7 may refer to one of the following submarines:

== Germany ==
- SM U-7 (Germany), was a Type U 5 submarine launched in 1910 and served in the First World War until sunk on 21 January 1915
  - During the First World War, Germany also had these submarines with similar names:
    - SM UB-7, a Type UB I submarine launched in 1915 and sunk on 27 September 1916
    - SM UC-7, a Type UC I submarine launched in 1915 and grounded on 5 July 1916
- German submarine U-7 (1935), a Type IIB submarine that served in the Second World War and stricken on 18 February 1944
- German submarine U-7 (S186), a Type 205 submarine of the Bundesmarine that was launched in 1964 and sold in 1965

== Austria-Hungary ==
- SM U-7 (Austria-Hungary) was the designation applied to two submarines:
  - SM U-66, ordered as U-7, the lead boat for the Austro-Hungarian Navy U-7 class; sold to Germany before her 1915 launch; became lead boat of Type U 66 submarine; disappeared September 1917
  - SM UB-7, a Type UB I submarine that operated in the Mediterranean Sea; co-flagged as the Austro-Hungarian U-boat SM U-7; disappeared September 1916
