= SM U-8 (Austria-Hungary) =

SM U-8 (Austria-Hungary) may refer to one of the following World War I German U-boats:

- SM U-67, ordered as U-8, part of the Austro-Hungarian Navy U-7 class; sold to Germany before 1915 launch and became one of the German Type U 66 submarines; surrendered to the British and broken up in 1921
- SM UB-8, a German Type UB I submarine that operated in the Mediterranean; co-flagged as the Austro-Hungarian U-boat SM U-8; sold to Bulgaria in May 1916 as Podvodnik No. 18 (in Cyrillic: Подводник No. 18); surrendered to France and broken up in August 1921
