= U7 =

U7 or U-7 may refer to:

== Arts, entertainment, and media ==
- Ultima VII, a computer game taking place in Brittania

== Science and technology ==
- U7 small nuclear RNA, an RNA molecule
- Haplogroup U7, a human mitochondrial DNA haplogroup

== Transportation ==
=== Transport lines ===
- U7 (Berlin U-Bahn), a subway line in Berlin, Germany
- U7, the IATA call sign for Uganda Airlines, the national airline of Uganda
- London Buses route U7

=== Vehicles ===
- Aiways U7 Ion, a Chinese electric concept minivan
- German submarine U-7, one of several German submarines
- Luxgen U7, a Taiwanese mid-size SUV
- Beijing U7, a Chinese saloon

== See also ==
- 7U (disambiguation)
