= SM U-66 =

German submarine

History

German Empire
- Name: U-66
- Ordered: 2 February 1913
- Builder: Germaniawerft, Kiel
- Yard number: 203
- Laid down: 1 November 1913, as U-7 (Austria-Hungary)
- Launched: 22 April 1915
- Commissioned: 23 July 1915
- Fate: Missing since 3 September 1917, possibly in the Dogger Bank area to a mine. 40 dead (all hands lost)

General characteristics
- Type: Type U 66 submarine
- Displacement: 791 t (779 long tons) surfaced; 933 t (918 long tons) submerged
- Length: 69.50 m (228 ft) (o/a); 54.66 m (179 ft 4 in) (pressure hull)
- Beam: 6.30 m (20 ft 8 in) (o/a); 4.15 m (13 ft 7 in) (pressure hull)
- Height: 7.95 m (26 ft 1 in)
- Draft: 3.79 m (12 ft 5 in)
- Propulsion: 1 × shaft; 2 × Germania 6-cylinder four-stroke diesel engines, 2,269 shp (1,692 kW) total; 2 × SSW electric motors, 1,223 shp (912 kW) total
- Speed: 16.8 knots (31.1 km/h; 19.3 mph) surfaced; 10.3 knots (19.1 km/h; 11.9 mph) submerged
- Range: 7,370 nmi (13,650 km; 8,480 mi) at 8 knots (15 km/h; 9.2 mph) surfaced; 115 nmi (213 km; 132 mi) at 4 knots (7.4 km/h; 4.6 mph) submerged
- Test depth: 50 m (160 ft)
- Complement: 4 officers, 32 enlisted men
- Armament: 5 × 45 cm (17.7 in) torpedo tubes (four bow, one stern); 12 torpedoes; 1 × 8.8 cm (3.5 in) SK L/30 deck gun, later replaced by 10.5 cm (4.1 in) SK L/45 deck gun

Service record
- Part of: Baltic Flotilla; 17 October 1915 – 15 January 1916; IV Flotilla; 15 January 1916 – 3 September 1917
- Commanders: Kptlt. Thorwald von Bothmer; 23 July 1915 – 16 June 1917; Kptlt. Gerhard Muhle; 17 June – 3 September 1917
- Operations: 7 patrols
- Victories: 25 merchant ships sunk (73,847 GRT); 2 merchant ship damaged (6,714 GRT); 1 warship damaged (5,250 tons); 1 merchant ship taken as prize (1,005 GRT)

SM U-66 was the lead ship of the Type U-66 submarines or U-boats for the Imperial German Navy (German: Kaiserliche Marine) during World War I. The submarine had been laid down in Kiel in November 1913 as U-7, the lead ship of the U-7 class for the Austro-Hungarian Navy (German: Kaiserliche und Königliche Kriegsmarine or K.u.K. Kriegsmarine). They became convinced after the outbreak of war in August 1914 that none of these submarines could be delivered to the Adriatic via Gibraltar, and sold the entire class, including U-7, to the German Imperial Navy in November 1914.

Under German control, the class became known as the U-66 type and the boats were renumbered; U-7 became U-66, and all were redesigned and reconstructed to German specifications. U-66 was launched in April 1915 and commissioned in July. As completed, she displaced 791 tonnes (779 long tons) when surfaced and 933 tonnes (918 long tons) submerged. The boat was 69.50 metres (228 ft) long and was armed with five torpedo tubes and a deck gun.

As a part of the Baltic and IV Flotillas, U-66 sank 25 ships with a combined gross register tonnage of 73,847 in six war patrols. The U-boat also torpedoed and damaged the British cruiser Falmouth in August 1916. U-66 left Emden on her seventh patrol on 2 September 1917 for operations in the North Channel. The following day the U-boat reported her position in the North Sea but neither she nor any of her 40-man crew were ever heard from again. A postwar German study offered no explanation for U-66's loss, although British records suggest that she may have struck a mine in the Dogger Bank area.

== Design and construction ==
After the Austro-Hungarian Navy had competitively evaluated three foreign submarine designs, it selected the Germaniawerft 506d design, also known as the Type UD, for its new U-7 class of five submarines. The Navy ordered five boats on 1 February 1913.

The U-7 class was seen by the Austro-Hungarian Navy as an improved version of its U-3 class, which was also a Germaniawerft design. (Note: The U-3-class submarines, however, were less than half the displacement and nearly 90 feet (27 m) shorter than the U-7 design. See: Gardiner, pp. 342–43.) As designed for the Austro-Hungarian Navy, the boats were to displace 695 long tons (706 t) on the surface and 885 long tons (899 t) while submerged. The double-hulled boats were to be 69.50 m (228 ft) long overall with a beam of 6.30 m (20 ft 8 in) and a draft of 3.79 m (12 ft 5 in). The Austrian specifications called for two shafts with twin diesel engines (2,269 shp (1,692 kW) total) for surface running at up to 17 knots (31 km/h; 20 mph), and twin electric motors (1,223 shp (912 kW) total) for a maximum of 11 knots (20 km/h; 13 mph) when submerged. The boats were designed with five 45 cm (17.7 in) torpedo tubes; four located in the bow, one in the stern. The boats' armament was to also include a single 6.6 centimetres (2.6 in)/26 deck gun.

U-7 and sister boat SM U-67 were both laid down on 1 November 1913, the first two boats of the class begun. Their construction was scheduled for completion within 29 to 33 months, but neither U-7 nor any of her sister boats were complete when World War I began in August 1914. Because the boats were under construction at Kiel on the Baltic Sea, the Austrians became convinced that it would be impossible to take delivery: the boats would need to be transferred into the Mediterranean past Gibraltar, a British territory. (Note: The Austro-Hungarian Navy's Germaniawerft-built U-3 class boats had been towed from Kiel to Pola via Gibraltar in 1909. See: Sieche, p. 19.) As a result, U-7 and her four sisters were sold to the Imperial German Navy on 28 November 1914. (Note: In April 1915, just five months later, the German U-21 successfully entered the Mediterranean through the Strait of Gibraltar, proving that delivery could have been possible after all. See: Gardiner, p. 343.)

U-7 was renumbered by the Germans as U-66 when her class was redesignated as the Type U-66. The Imperial German Navy had the submarines redesigned and reconstructed to German standards, increasing the surface and submerged displacements by 96 and 48 tonnes (94 and 47 long tons), respectively. The torpedo load was increased by a third, from 9 to 12, and the deck gun size was upgraded from the 6.6-centimeter (2.6 in) size originally specified to 8.8 cm (3.5 in) SK L/30.

== Early career ==
U-66 was launched on 22 April 1915. On 23 July, SM U-66 was commissioned into the Imperial German Navy under the command of Kapitänleutnant (Kptlt.) Thorwald von Bothmer, a 31-year-old, thirteen-year veteran of the Imperial German Navy. U-66 was assigned to the Baltic Flotilla (German: U-boote der Ostseestreitkräfte V. Unterseeboots-Halbflottille) on 17 October.

In late September, the British submarine flotilla in the Baltic began a submarine offensive against German ships, intending to deny free passage of cargo, especially iron ore, from neutral Sweden to Germany. In A Naval History of World War I, author Paul G. Halpern reports on part of the German response, which was an experiment involving U-66. The U-boat was towed behind an "innocent-looking vessel" and connected to the host ship by a telephone line in addition to the towline. U-66 was able to cast off at a moment's notice to attack an enemy submarine. Halpern does not report on any encounters by U-66, nor does he provide any insight into the overall effectiveness of the plan. U-66 was not credited with the sinking of any vessels of any kind during this time. On 15 January 1916, she was transferred from the Baltic Flotilla into the IV Flotilla (German: IV. Unterseeboots-Halbflottille), where she joined her sister boats U-67 and U-68. (Note: Both of U-66's remaining sister boats, U-69 and U-70, were attached to the IV Flotilla by early March, and for just under three weeks (until U-68 was sunk), all five of the Type U 66 boats were in the same unit. See; Tarrant, p. 30 (for sinking of U-68), and p. 34 (for Flotilla membership).)

== Second German offensive ==
Germany began its second submarine offensive against shipping the month after U-66 joined the IV Flotilla. As in the first submarine offensive, U-boats were sent independently around Scotland to patrol the Irish Sea and the western entrance to the English Channel. The first reported activity of U-66 during this campaign reveals that she sank her first ship on 5 April 1916. On that date she was in the vicinity of Fastnet Rock and came upon the 3,890-ton British refrigerated cargo ship Zent headed from Garston to Santa Marta in ballast. U-66 torpedoed Zent 28 nautical miles (52 km; 32 mi) from Fastnet and sank the ship with the loss of 49 crewmen; the master and nine sailors were rescued and landed at Queenstown. Over the next two days, U-66 dispatched two French sailing vessels, the 151-ton Binicaise, and the 397-ton fishing smack Sainte Marie west of the Isles of Scilly. On 8 April, von Bothmer and U-66 sank the Spanish-flagged Santanderino 18 nautical miles (33 km; 21 mi) from Ushant. Santanderino, a 3,346-ton ship built in 1890, was sailing from Liverpool to Havana, and U-66 gave 15 minutes' notice for all the passengers and crew to abandon ship; four drowned during the evacuation. Santanderino's 36 survivors were rescued by a Danish steamer and landed at a port on the Bay of Biscay.

U-66 continued her attacks on merchant shipping on 9 April with the sinking of three ships, the British steamers Eastern City and Glenalmond and the Norwegian ship Sjolyst. The 4,341-ton Eastern City was sailing from Saint-Nazaire to Barry Roads in ballast when she was shelled by U-66 and sent to the bottom 18 nautical miles (33 km; 21 mi) from Ushant; all of her crew survived and were landed by 11 April. U-66's next victim was the 2,888-ton Glenalmond sailing from Bilbao to Clyde laden with iron ore. Torpedoes from U-66 sank the ship 27 nautical miles (50 km; 31 mi) north of Ushant, but all her crew were saved. The 20-year-old Norwegian steamer Sjolyst was sailing in ballast from Nantes to Manchester when U-66 sank her about two nautical miles (four kilometers) from where Glenalmond went down. Sjolyst's master and entire crew were picked up by the British steamer Libra and landed at Cardiff.

U-66 finished out her busy month the next day by sinking one British and one Italian ship. U-66 sank the British steamer Margam Abbey 55 nautical miles (102 km; 63 mi) southwest of the Lizard while the ship was en route from Bordeaux to Barry Roads in ballast. Margam Abbey, at 4,471 tons, was the largest ship sunk by U-66 to that time. The Italian freighter Unione was sailing with a load of coal from Clyde for Genoa when U-66 torpedoed her off Land's End. The sinking of Unione, with a tonnage of 2,367, raised U-66's tally for the month of April to nine ships with a combined tonnage of 22,848, all sunk in a six-day span. Near the end of April 1916, Admiral Reinhard Scheer, the new commander-in-chief of the High Seas Fleet (under which U-66's IV Flotilla operated), called off the merchant shipping offensive and ordered all boats at sea to return, and all boats in port to remain there.

== Grand Fleet ambushes ==
In mid-May 1916, Scheer completed plans to draw out part of the British Grand Fleet. The German High Seas Fleet would sortie for a raid on Sunderland, luring the British fleet across "'nests' of submarines and mine-fields". U-66 was one of nine U-boats that put out to sea beginning on 17 May to scout the central North Sea for signs of the British fleet. Completing five days of scouting, U-66, along with U-63, U-51, U-32, sister boat U-70, U-24, and U-52, took up position off the Firth of Forth on 23 May. The other two boats, U-43 and U-44, were stationed off Pentland Firth, in position to attack the British fleet leaving Scapa Flow. All the boats were to remain on station until 1 June and await a coded message which would report the sailing of the British fleet. Unfortunately for the Germans, the British Admiralty had intelligence reports of the departure of the submarines which, coupled with an absence of attacks on shipping, aroused British suspicions.

A delayed departure of the German fleet for its sortie (which had been redirected to the Skagerrak) and the failure of five U-boats, including U-66, to receive the coded message warning of the British advance caused Scheer's anticipated ambush to be a "complete and disappointing failure". Although she had not received the advance warning of the coded message, U-66 was one of the two ambush U-boats that actually saw parts of the British fleet. At 09:00 on 31 May, U-66 sent out a wireless report of eight battleships, light cruisers, and destroyers on a northerly course 60 nautical miles (110 km; 69 mi) east of Kinnaird Head. (Note: The other U-boat that reported activity, SM U-32, stationed 155 nautical miles (287 km; 178 mi) off the Firth of Forth, had reported seeing two battleships, two cruisers and several destroyers headed in a southeasterly direction two hours earlier.) U-66 was unable to make any attacks on the ships she reported due to the presence of screening vessels. The failure of the submarine ambush to sink any British capital ships allowed the full Grand Fleet to engage the numerically inferior High Seas Fleet in the Battle of Jutland, which took place 31 May – 1 June.

The next mention of U-66 in sources is on 11 August, when she sank Inverdruie, a 613-ton three-masted Norwegian bark. Inverdruie was carrying a load of pit props from Sandefjord to Hartlepool when she was sunk some 160 nautical miles (300 km; 180 mi) east of Aberdeen.

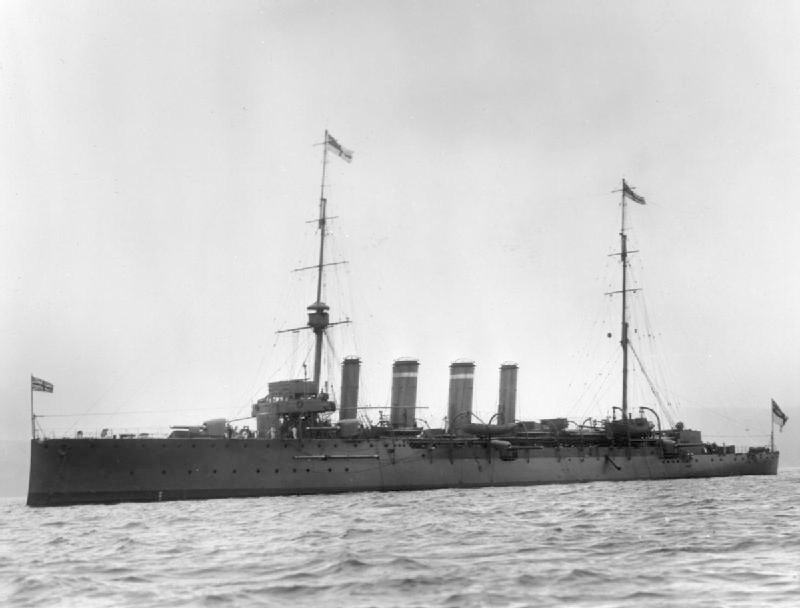
The British light cruiser Falmouth was torpedoed by U-66 on 19 August off Flamborough Head. Falmouth was sunk by U-63 while crossing Standlinie II around noon the next day while under tow.

Later in August, the Germans set up another ambush for the British fleet, when they drew up plans for another High Seas Fleet raid on Sunderland (as had been the original intention in May). The German fleet planned to depart late in the day on 18 August and shell military targets the next morning. U-66 was one of 24 U-boats that formed five lines (German: Standlinie) in the expected paths of any Grand Fleet sorties. Standlinie II, consisting of U-63, U-49, U-45, U-66, and U-64, formed a 35-nautical-mile (65 km; 40 mi) front 12 nautical miles (22 km; 14 mi) off Flamborough Head. The other four Standlinie formed similar lines to the north and south; all were to be in place by 08:00 on 19 August. Once again, British intelligence had given warning of the impending attack and ambush, causing the Grand Fleet to sortie at 16:00 on 18 August, five hours before the German fleet sailed.

At 04:45 on 19 August, U-66 fired a spread of two torpedoes at the British light cruiser Falmouth from a distance of 1,000 yards (910 m). Both torpedoes scored hits on Falmouth's starboard side, flooding the warship forward and aft. The cruiser's mechanical spaces—located amidships—remained intact and in working order, so she was steered to the Humber with an escort of three destroyers and an armed trawler. U-66 tried repeatedly to deal the stricken cruiser a coup de grâce, but narrowly missed with torpedoes on several further attacks. U-66 broke off her pursuit after two hours, having endured multiple attacks from Falmouth's screening destroyers. One depth charge attack blew out all the lights on U-66 and knocked clips off two hatches that caused the boat to flood with a considerable quantity of water before the leaks could be sealed. Falmouth continued under tow at 2 knots (3.7 km/h) until she crossed Standlinie II and was attacked and sunk by U-63 around noon the next day.

Records on U-66 next appear in late 1916, when she is reported as one of the U-boat escorts assisting the German merchant raider Wolf into the North Atlantic. Wolf, under the command of Karl August Nerger, began a 15-month raiding voyage on 30 November that took the ship into the Indian and Pacific Oceans before a safe return to Germany. U-66's specific locations for this duty are not reported, but on 11 December she sank a Norwegian steamer and a Swedish sailing ship. U-66 shelled the 1,090-ton Norwegian steamer Bjor 4 nautical miles (7.4 km; 4.6 mi) southwest of the Norwegian island of Ryvingen. The ship and her general cargo, headed from Gothenburg to Hull, were sent to the bottom without loss of life, and her crew was safely landed by 14 December. The same day, U-66 also sank the 311-ton Swedish sailing ship Palander off the island of Oxö, near the town of Tornio on the Sweden–Finland border.

== Unrestricted submarine warfare ==
From the early stages of the war the Royal Navy had blockaded Germany, preventing neutral shipping from reaching German ports. By the time of the so-called "turnip winter" of 1916–17, the blockade had severely limited imports of food and fuel into Germany. Among the results were an increase in infant mortality and as many as 700,000 deaths attributed to starvation or hypothermia during the war. With the blockade having such dire consequences, Kaiser Wilhelm II personally approved a resumption of unrestricted submarine warfare to begin on 1 February 1917 to help force the British to make peace. The new rules of engagement specified that no ship was to be left afloat.

U-66's first victim under the new rules was encountered on 1 March. The Norwegian steamer Gurre, reported as 1,733 tons, was crossing the North Sea while steaming from Narvik and Fredrikshald for Hull with a cargo of iron ore. U-66 torpedoed her at position 59°30′N 2°0′E, sending the doomed Norwegian ship into the murky depths with 20 of her crew. The same day, U-66 encountered another Norwegian cargo ship, the 1,005-ton Livingstone, headed from Skien to Charente with a cargo of ammonium nitrate. Livingstone's cargo, used in the making of explosives and munitions, was too valuable to destroy. U-66's captain seized the ship as a prize east of Shetland. Further details of the encounter do not appear in sources, but it is known that the 11-year-old Livingstone not only survived the war, but remained in service under a variety of names until she was scrapped in 1962.

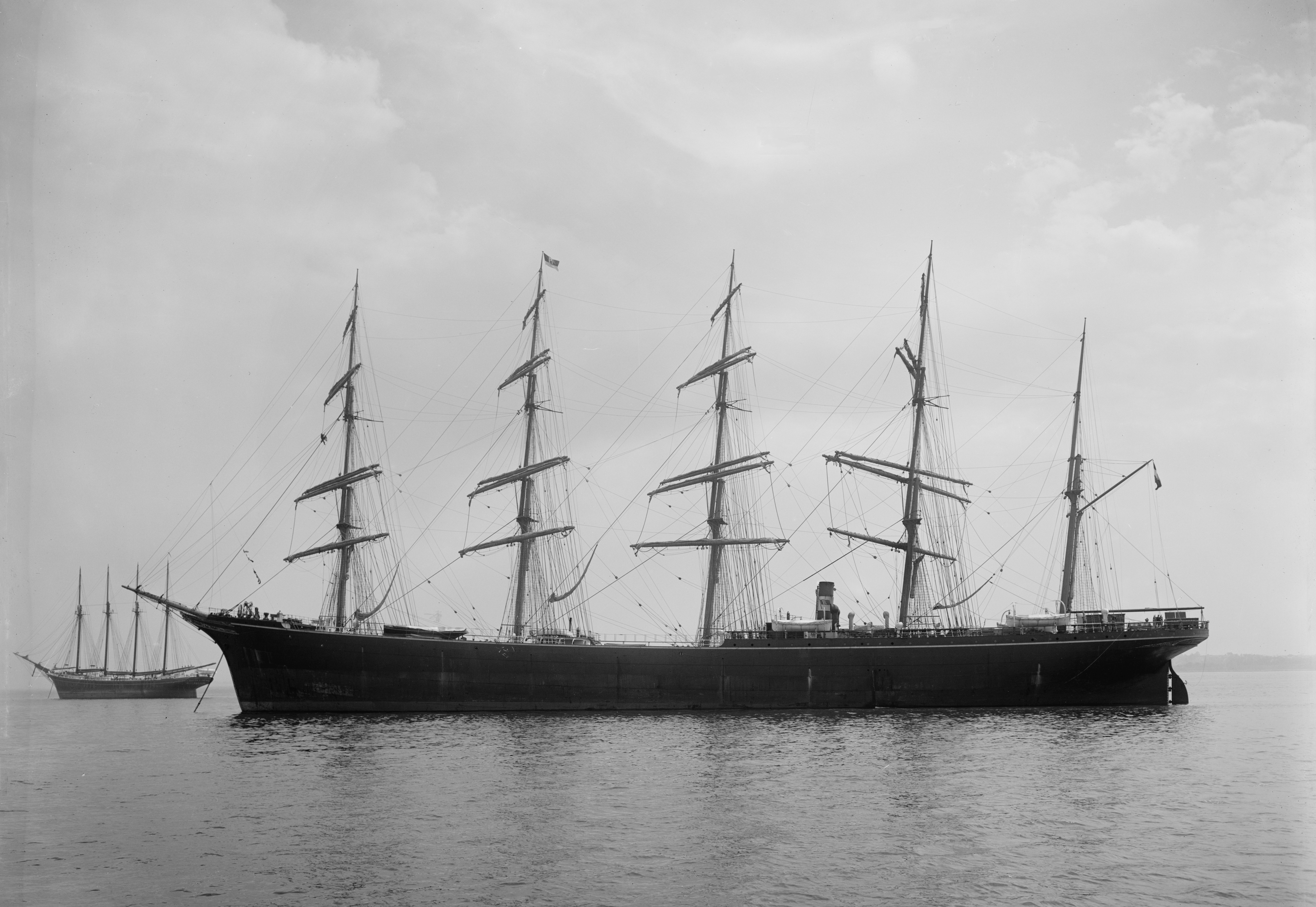
Neath, the former German bark R. C. Rickmers, was sunk by U-66 on 27 March 1917.

In late March, U-66 sank another two vessels. The 3,597-ton cargo ship Stuart Prince was headed from Manchester and Belfast to Alexandria with a general cargo when U-66 came upon her 85 nautical miles (157 km; 98 mi) off Broad Haven, County Mayo. U-66's torpedo attack was successful, sinking the ship and killing 20 men, including the ship's master. Five days later, U-66 encountered the five-masted bark Neath 28 nautical miles (52 km; 32 mi) south by east of Fastnet Rock. Equipped with an auxiliary triple-expansion steam engine, Neath was the former German bark R. C. Rickmers which had been seized by the Admiralty at Cardiff in August 1914. After U-66 torpedoed Neath at 08:45, the bark, en route from Martinique to Le Havre with a load of sugar, sank in seven minutes. The master of Neath was taken prisoner, but had been released and landed at Queenstown two days later.

During April 1917, German U-boats sank 860,334 tons of Allied and neutral shipping, a monthly total unsurpassed in either of the two world wars. U-66's sole contribution to this figure came when she torpedoed the tanker Powhatan 25 nautical miles (46 km; 29 mi) from North Rona in the Outer Hebrides. The 6,117-ton ship, which was carrying fuel oil from Sabine, Texas to Kirkwall, bested Margam Abbey as U-66's largest ship sunk when she went down with 36 of her crew. As was done with the master of Neath, Powhatan's master was taken prisoner aboard U-66.

Although the monthly total of tonnage sunk by all U-boats had peaked in April, the losses were over 600,000 tons in each of May and June. U-66 did not contribute to the May tally but, with her most successful month since April 1916, added to the June figures. On 5 June, U-66 torpedoed the 3,472-ton Italian steamer Amor which was on her way to Liverpool from Galveston; Amor sank approximately 200 nautical miles (370 km; 230 mi) from Fastnet Rock. The same day, Manchester Miller, a 4,234-ton steamer sailing from Philadelphia for Manchester with a load of cotton, was sunk about 10 nautical miles (19 km; 12 mi) away from Amor when she was hit by a torpedo from U-66. Eight crewmen died in the attack; the survivors, who included three Americans, were landed on 9 June.

Two days after the attacks on Amor and Manchester Miller, U-66 attacked two more British steamers. The 4,329-ton Ikalis, carrying wheat from New York to Manchester, was torpedoed and sunk 170 nautical miles (310 km; 200 mi) from Fastnet Rock. The cargo ship Cranmore, of 3,157 tons, was headed to Manchester from Baltimore with a general cargo when torpedoed some 150 nautical miles (280 km; 170 mi) northwest of Fastnet. Though the ship was damaged, Cranmore's crew was able to beach her; the ship was later refloated and re-entered service.

U-66 sank her largest ship, the 6,583-ton British steamer Bay State on 10 June. The Warren Line cargo steamer had departed from Boston (the capital of Massachusetts nicknamed, coincidentally, the "Bay State") with a $2,000,000 war cargo destined for Liverpool. U-66 intercepted the ship 250 nautical miles (460 km; 290 mi) northwest of Fastnet and sank her, but there were no casualties among her crew of 45. Four days later, U-66 encountered the Norwegian bark Perfect, laden with grain, headed from Bahía Blanca for Copenhagen. Perfect, which had been built in 1877, was dispatched by U-66's deck gun at position 60°58′N 2°18′E, east of Shetland.

On 17 June, Kptlt. von Bothmer was replaced by Kptlt. Gerhard Muhle as commander of the U-boat. U-66 was the first (and ultimately only) U-boat command for the 31-year-old Muhle, who had been a classmate of von Bothmer when both had joined the Kaiserliche Marine in April 1902. On 9 July, U-66 sank her first ship under her new commander, when she sent the Spanish steamer Iparraguirre to the bottom. The 1,161-ton steamer was headed to Santander from Piteå and Bergen with a cargo of pitwood, when U-66 attacked her west of the Orkney Islands.

U-66 scored another success when she torpedoed and sank the outbound British steamer African Prince on 21 July 60 nautical miles (110 km; 69 mi) north-northwest of Tory Island. The freighter—a Prince Line line-mate of Stuart Prince, sunk by U-66 in March—was carrying china clay from Liverpool to Newport News. The same day, U-66 also sank the 1,322-ton British sailing ship Harold about 5 nautical miles (9.3 km; 5.8 mi) from where African Prince went down. These two ships were the last sinkings credited to U-66. During six successful patrols, U-66 had sunk 25 ships and seized a 26th as a prize, for a combined total tonnage of 74,852.

U-66 began her seventh and what was to be her final patrol on the morning of 2 September when she departed from Emden destined for operations in the North Channel. Shortly after noon on 3 September, U-66 reported a position in the North Sea that placed her beyond known British minefields, in what was her last known contact. A postwar German study offered no explanation for U-66's loss. British records suggest that U-66 may have either struck a mine in an older minefield in the Dogger Bank area, or that a combination of destroyers, submarines, and anti-submarine net tenders sank U-66 sometime between 1 and 11 October. Author Dwight Messimer discounts this latter theory as not being supported by operational details.

== Summary of raiding history ==
Ships sunk or damaged by SM U-66
Date	Name	Nationality	(Note: Merchant ship tonnages are in gross register tons. Military vessels are listed by tons displacement.) Tonnage	Fate
5 April 1916	Zent	United Kingdom	3,890	Sunk
6 April 1916	Binicaise	France	151	Sunk
7 April 1916	Sainte Marie	France	397	Sunk
7 April 1916	Rijndijk	Netherlands	3,557	Damaged
8 April 1916	Santanderino	Spain	3,346	Sunk
9 April 1916	Eastern City	United Kingdom	4,341	Sunk
9 April 1916	Glenalmond	United Kingdom	2,888	Sunk
9 April 1916	Sjolyst	Norway	997	Sunk
10 April 1916	Margam Abbey	United Kingdom	4,471	Sunk
10 April 1916	Unione	Kingdom of Italy	2,367	Sunk
11 August 1916	Inverdruie	Norway	613	Sunk
19 August 1916	HMS Falmouth	Royal Navy	5,250	Damaged
11 December 1916	Bjor	Norway	1,090	Sunk
11 December 1916	Palander	Sweden	311	Sunk
1 March 1917	Gurre	Norway	1,733	Sunk
1 March 1917	Livingstone	Norway	1,005	Captured as prize
22 March 1917	Stuart Prince	United Kingdom	3,597	Sunk
27 March 1917	Neath	United Kingdom	5,548	Sunk
6 April 1917	Powhatan	United Kingdom	6,117	Sunk
5 June 1917	Amor	Kingdom of Italy	3,472	Sunk
5 June 1917	Manchester Miller	United Kingdom	4,234	Sunk
7 June 1917	Cranmore	United Kingdom	3,157	Damaged
7 June 1917	Ikalis	United Kingdom	4,329	Sunk
10 June 1917	Bay State	United Kingdom	6,583	Sunk
10 June 1917	Highbury	United Kingdom	4,831	Sunk
14 June 1917	Perfect	Norway	1,088	Sunk
9 July 1917	Iparraguirre	Spain	1,161	Sunk
21 July 1917	African Prince	United Kingdom	4,916	Sunk
21 July 1917	Harold	United Kingdom	1,376	Sunk
		(Note: Tonnage of ships captured as prizes is included in tonnage sunk.)Sunk: Damaged: Total:	74,852; 11,964; 86,816	

== Bibliography ==
- Beesly, Patrick (1982). Room 40: British Naval Intelligence 1914–1918. London: H Hamilton. ISBN 978-0-241-10864-2.
- Gardiner, Robert; Gray, Randal, eds. (1985). Conway's All the World's Fighting Ships 1906–1921. Annapolis, Maryland: Naval Institute Press. ISBN 978-0-87021-907-8. OCLC 12119866.
- Gröner, Erich; Jung, Dieter; Maass, Martin (1991). German Warships 1815–1945, U-boats and Mine Warfare Vessels. Vol. 2. Translated by Thomas, Keith; Magowan, Rachel. London: Conway Maritime Press. ISBN 0-85177-593-4.
- Halpern, Paul G. (1994). A Naval History of World War I. Annapolis, Maryland: Naval Institute Press. ISBN 978-0-87021-266-6. OCLC 28411665.
- Hoyt, Edwin Palmer (1974). Raider Wolf: The Voyage of Captain Nerger, 1916–1918 (1st American ed.). New York: P.S. Eriksson. ISBN 978-0-8397-7067-1. OCLC 1128815.
- Koerver, Hans Joachim (2008). Room 40: German Naval Warfare 1914–1918. Vol I., The Fleet in Action. Steinbach: LIS Reinisch. ISBN 978-3-902433-76-3.
- Koerver, Hans Joachim (2009). Room 40: German Naval Warfare 1914–1918. Vol II., The Fleet in Being. Steinbach: LIS Reinisch. ISBN 978-3-902433-77-0.
- Messimer, Dwight R. (2002). Verschollen: World War I U-boat losses. Annapolis, Maryland: Naval Institute Press. ISBN 978-1-55750-475-3. OCLC 231973419.
- Roessler, Eberhard (1997). Die Unterseeboote der Kaiserlichen Marine. Bonn: Bernard & Graefe. ISBN 978-3-7637-5963-7.
- Schroeder, Joachim (2002). Die U-Boote des Kaisers. Bonn: Bernard & Graefe. ISBN 978-3-7637-6235-4.
- Sieche, Erwin F. (1980). "Austro-Hungarian Submarines". Warship, Volume 2. Annapolis, Maryland: Naval Institute Press. ISBN 978-0-87021-976-4. OCLC 233144055.
- Spindler, Arno (1966) [1932]. Der Handelskrieg mit U-Booten. 5 Vols. Frankfurt: Mittler & Sohn. (Vols. 4+5, dealing with 1917+18, are very hard to find: Guildhall Library, London, has them all, also Vol. 1–3 in an English translation: The submarine war against commerce)
- Tarrant, V. E. (1989). The U-Boat Offensive: 1914–1945. Annapolis, Maryland: Naval Institute Press. ISBN 978-0-87021-764-7. OCLC 20338385.
- Tennent, A. J. (2006) [1990]. British Merchant Ships Sunk by U boats in the 1914–1918 War. Penzance: Periscope Publishing. ISBN 1-904381-36-7.
