= SM U-7 (Austria-Hungary) =

SM U-7 (Austria-Hungary) may refer to one of the following World War I German U-boats:

- SM U-66, ordered as U-7, the lead boat for the Austro-Hungarian Navy U-7 class; sold to Germany before 1915 launch; became lead boat of German Type U 66 submarine; disappeared September 1917
- SM UB-7, a German Type UB I submarine that operated in the Mediterranean; co-flagged as the Austro-Hungarian U-boat SM U-7; disappeared September 1916
