= 7U =

7U or 7-U may refer to:

- 7U. IATA code for Aviaenergo
- Ciroën 7U
- HT-7U, internal designation for Experimental Advanced Superconducting Tokamak
- One of the possible sizes of a rack unit, 10.50-inches (266.70mm) nominal. See rack mount.
- P2V-7U, a model of Lockheed P-2 Neptune
- Su-7U, a model of Sukhoi Su-7
- Yak-7U, a model of Yakovlev Yak-7
- I-7U, a model of Mikoyan-Gurevich I-75
- Type 7U, a model of Gnevny class destroyer

== See also ==
- U7 (disambiguation)
