= SS Lincoln (1883) =

Passenger and cargo vessel

History
- Name: 1883–1914: SS Lincoln; 1914–1917: SS Elikon
- Operator: 1883–1897: Manchester, Sheffield and Lincolnshire Railway; 1897–1914: Great Central Railway; 1914–1917: Greek owners
- Port of registry: (United Kingdom)
- Builder: Earle's Shipbuilding, Hull
- Launched: 7 March 1883
- Fate: Sunk 2 February 1917

General characteristics
- Tonnage: 1,075 gross register tons (GRT)
- Length: 251.5 feet (76.7 m)
- Beam: 32.2 feet (9.8 m)
- Depth: 15.9 feet (4.8 m)

SS Lincoln was a passenger and cargo vessel built for the Manchester, Sheffield and Lincolnshire Railway in 1883.

== History ==
The ship was built by Earle's Shipbuilding of Hull and launched on 7 March 1883.

She was put into the Grimsby to Hamburg service. In the winter this could be obstructed by ice in the River Elbe and on 20 January 1893 she took seven hours to complete the distance from Cuxhaven to Hamburg.

In 1896 the crew were sacked by the railway company for refusing to discharge cargo at Hamburg.

In 1897 she transferred to the Great Central Railway. On 20 January 1911 she went ashore on Haisborough Sands while on a voyage from Antwerp to Grimsby in thick fog. She was refloated on 21 January and resumed her journey.

She was sold in 1914 to Greek owners and renamed Elikon. She was sunk on 2 February 1917 in the Atlantic Ocean west of Cape Penas, Spain (43°44′N 6°16′W) by SM U-67. Her crew survived.
