= SM U-69 =

German Imperial Navy's Type U 66 submarine

History

German Empire
- Name: U-69
- Ordered: 2 February 1913
- Builder: Germaniawerft, Kiel
- Yard number: 206
- Laid down: 7 February 1914, as U-10 (Austria-Hungary)
- Launched: 24 June 1915
- Commissioned: 4 September 1915
- Fate: Missing after 11 July 1917 (crew presumed dead)

General characteristics
- Class & type: Type U 66 submarine
- Displacement: 791 t (779 long tons) surfaced; 933 t (918 long tons) submerged
- Length: 69.50 m (228 ft) (o/a); 54.66 m (179 ft 4 in) (pressure hull)
- Beam: 6.30 m (20 ft 8 in) (o/a); 4.15 m (13 ft 7 in) (pressure hull)
- Height: 7.95 m (26 ft 1 in)
- Draft: 3.79 m (12 ft 5 in)
- Propulsion: 1 × shaft; 2 × Germania 6-cylinder four-stroke diesel engines, 2,300 PS (2,300 shp; 1,700 kW) total; 2 × Pichler & Co. double-acting electric motors, 1,240 PS (1,220 shp; 910 kW) total
- Speed: 16.8 knots (31.1 km/h; 19.3 mph) surfaced; 10.3 knots (19.1 km/h; 11.9 mph) submerged
- Range: 7,370 nmi (13,650 km; 8,480 mi) at 8 knots (15 km/h; 9.2 mph) surfaced; 115 nmi (213 km; 132 mi) at 4 knots (7.4 km/h; 4.6 mph) submerged
- Test depth: 50 m (160 ft)
- Complement: 4 officers, 32 enlisted men
- Armament: 5 × 45 cm (17.7 in) torpedo tubes (four bow, one stern); 12 torpedoes; 1 × 8.8 cm (3.5 in) SK L/30 deck gun, later replaced by 10.5 cm (4.1 in) SK L/45 deck gun

Service record
- Part of: IV Flotilla; 4 March 1916 – 23 July 1917
- Commanders: Kptlt. Ernst Wilhelms; 4 September 1915 – 23 July 1917
- Operations: 6 patrols
- Victories: 29 merchant ships sunk (89,266 GRT); 2 auxiliary warships sunk (13,609 GRT); 1 merchant ship damaged (1,648 GRT)

SM U-69 was a Type U 66 submarine or U-boat for the German Imperial Navy (German: Kaiserliche Marine) during the First World War. She had been laid down in February 1914 as U-10 the fourth boat of the U-7 class for the Austro-Hungarian Navy (German: Kaiserliche und Königliche Kriegsmarine or K.u.K. Kriegsmarine) but was sold to Germany, along with the others in her class, in November 1914.

The submarine was ordered as U-10 from Germaniawerft of Kiel as the first of five boats of the U-7 class for the Austro-Hungarian Navy. After the outbreak of World War I in August 1914, the Austro-Hungarian Navy became convinced that none of the submarines of the class could be delivered to the Adriatic via Gibraltar. As a consequence, the entire class, including U-10, was sold to the German Imperial Navy in November 1914. Under German control, the class became known as the U 66 type and the boats were renumbered; U-10 became U-69, and all were redesigned and reconstructed to German specifications. U-69 was launched in June 1915 and commissioned in September. As completed, she displaced 791 tonnes (779 long tons), surfaced, and 933 tonnes (918 long tons), submerged. The boat was 69.50 metres (228 ft) long and was armed with five torpedo tubes and a deck gun.

As a part of the 4th Flotilla, U-69 sank 31 ships with a combined gross register tonnage of 102,875 in five war patrols. U-69 left Emden on her sixth patrol on 9 July 1917 for operations off Ireland. On 11 July, U-69 reported her position off Norway but neither she nor any of her crew were ever heard from again. British records say that U-69 was sunk by destroyer HMS Patriot on 12 July, but a German postwar study cast doubt on this. U-69's fate is officially unknown.

== Design and construction ==
After the Austro-Hungarian Navy had competitively evaluated three foreign submarine designs, it selected the Germaniawerft 506d design, also known as the Type UD, for its new U-7 class of five submarines. The Navy ordered five boats on 1 February 1913.

The U-7 class was seen by the Austro-Hungarian Navy as an improved version of its U-3 class, which was also a Germaniawerft design. (Note: The U-3-class submarines, however, were less than half the displacement and nearly 90 feet (27 m) shorter than the U-7 design. See: Gardiner, pp. 342–43.) As designed for the Austro-Hungarian Navy, the boats were to displace 695 tonnes (684 long tons) on the surface and 885 tonnes (871 long tons) while submerged. The doubled-hulled boats were to be 69.50 metres (228 ft) long overall with a beam of 6.30 metres (20.7 ft) and a draft of 3.79 metres (12.4 ft). The Austrian specifications called for two shafts with twin diesel engines (2,300 metric horsepower (2,269 bhp; 1,692 kW) total) for surface running at up to 17 knots (31 km/h; 20 mph), and twin electric motors (1,240 PS (1,223 shp; 912 kW) total) for a maximum of 11 knots (20 km/h; 13 mph) when submerged. The boats were designed with five 45 cm (17.7 in) torpedo tubes; four located in the bow, one in the stern. The boats' armament was to also include a single 6.6 cm (2.6 in) deck gun.

U-10 was laid down on 7 February 1914, and her construction was slated to be complete within 29 to 33 months.

Neither U-10 nor any of her sister boats were complete when World War I began in August 1914. With the boats under construction at Kiel, the Austrians became convinced that it would be impossible to take delivery of the boats, which would need to be towed into the Mediterranean past Gibraltar, a British territory. (Note: The Austro-Hungarian Navy's Germaniawerft-built U-3 class boats had been towed from Kiel to Pola via Gibraltar in 1909. See: Sieche, p. 19.) As a result, U-10 and her four sisters were sold to the Imperial German Navy on 28 November 1914. (Note: In April 1915, just five months later, the German U-21 successfully entered the Mediterranean through the Straits of Gibraltar, proving that delivery would have been possible after all. See: Gardiner, p. 343.)

U-10 was renumbered by the Germans as U-69 when her class was redesignated as the Type U 66. The Imperial German Navy had the submarines redesigned and reconstructed to German standards, which increased the surface displacement by 96 tonnes (94 long tons) and the submerged by 48 tonnes (47 long tons). The torpedo load was increased by a third, from 9 to 12, and the deck gun was upgraded from the 6.6 cm (2.6 in) gun originally specified to an 8.8 cm (3.5 in) Uk L/30 one.

== Service career ==
U-69 was launched on 24 June 1915. On 4 September, SM U-69 was commissioned into the Imperial German Navy under the command of Kapitänleutnant Ernst Wilhelms. On 4 March 1916, U-69 was assigned to the IV. U-Halbflotille.

U-69 successfully completed five war patrols in which she sank 31 ships with a combined a total of 102,875 gross register tons (GRT). U-69's most successful month for number of ships sunk was April 1916, when she sank eight ships of 21,051 GRT in a span of six days. The month with the highest tonnage sunk was June 1917 when she sank five ships of 29,808 GRT in a nine-day span; nearly half of that total came from one ship, the 13,441 GRT British armed merchant cruiser Avenger sunk on 14 June. Avenger had been patrolling off the Shetland Islands and was returning to Scapa Flow, when she was struck by a single torpedo on the port side. The ship began listing heavily and non-essential crew were evacuated while destroyers arrived and took her under tow. Despite strenuous efforts to save her, Avenger foundered ten hours after being hit when her internal bulkheads collapsed. One man was killed in the attack.

U-69 began her sixth and final patrol on 9 July when she departed from Emden, destined for operations off Ireland. U-69's position report at 02:30 on 11 July reported that she was 35 nautical miles (65 km; 40 mi) south of Lindesnes, Norway, and was the last known contact with U-69. According to author Dwight Messimer, two British sources report that HMS Patriot sank U-69 at position 60°25′N 1°32′E on 12 July. An observer in a kite balloon deployed by Patriot spotted a surfaced U-boat at 07:00. The U-boat submerged and Patriot hunted the submarine until noon, when it loosed two depth charges that brought thick brown oil to the surface. A postwar study by Germany cast doubt on whether or not the submarine attacked by Patriot was U-69. Officially, her fate remains unknown.

== Summary of raiding history ==
Date	Name	Nationality	Tonnage (GRT)	Fate
15 April 1916	Fairport	United Kingdom	3,838	Sunk
15 April 1916	Schwanden	Russian Empire	844	Sunk
16 April 1916	Glendoon	Norway	1,918	Sunk
16 April 1916	Harrovian	United Kingdom	4,309	Sunk
16 April 1916	Papelera	Norway	1,591	Sunk
17 April 1916	Ernest Reyer	France	2,708	Sunk
18 April 1916	Ravenhill	United Kingdom	1,826	Sunk
20 April 1916	Cairngowan	United Kingdom	4,017	Sunk
11 July 1916	HMT Era	Royal Navy	168	Sunk
20 October 1916	Cabotia	United Kingdom	4,309	Sunk
24 October 1916	Sola	Norway	3,057	Sunk
26 October 1916	North Wales	United Kingdom	4,072	Sunk
26 October 1916	Rappahannock	United Kingdom	3,871	Sunk
2 November 1916	Spero	United Kingdom	1,132	Sunk
3 November 1916	Bertha	Sweden	591	Sunk
20 April 1917	Annapolis	United Kingdom	4,567	Sunk
25 April 1917	Hesperides	United Kingdom	3,393	Sunk
26 April 1917	Rio Lages	United Kingdom	3,591	Sunk
26 April 1917	Vauxhall	United Kingdom	3,629	Sunk
1 May 1917	Rockingham	United States	4,555	Sunk
2 May 1917	Troilus	United Kingdom	7,625	Sunk
29 May 1917	Argo	Sweden	123	Sunk
29 May 1917	Ines	Sweden	261	Sunk
29 May 1917	Consul N. Nielsen	Denmark	1,395	Sunk
31 May 1917	Esneh	United Kingdom	3,247	Sunk
3 June 1917	Luisa	Kingdom of Italy	1,648	Damaged
6 June 1917	Parthenia	United Kingdom	5,160	Sunk
8 June 1917	Enidwen	United Kingdom	3,594	Sunk
8 June 1917	Saragossa	United Kingdom	3,541	Sunk
13 June 1917	Kelvinbank	United Kingdom	4,072	Sunk
14 June 1917	Avenger	Royal Navy	13,441	Sunk
24 July 1917	Mikelis	Greece	2,430	Sunk

== Bibliography ==
- Gardiner, Robert; Gray, Randal, eds. (1985). Conway's All the World's Fighting Ships 1906–1921. Annapolis, Maryland: Naval Institute Press. ISBN 978-0-87021-907-8. OCLC 12119866.
- Gröner, Erich; Jung, Dieter; Maass, Martin (1991). U-boats and Mine Warfare Vessels. German Warships 1815–1945. Vol. 2. Translated by Thomas, Keith; Magowan, Rachel. London: Conway Maritime Press. ISBN 0-85177-593-4.
- Hepper, David (2006). British Warship Losses in the Ironclad Era 1860–1919. London: Chatham Publishing. ISBN 978-1-86176-273-3. OCLC 237129318.
- Messimer, Dwight R. (2002). Verschollen: World War I U-boat losses. Annapolis, Maryland: Naval Institute Press. ISBN 978-1-55750-475-3. OCLC 231973419.
- Sieche, Erwin F. (1980). "Austro-Hungarian Submarines". Warship, Volume 2. Naval Institute Press. ISBN 978-0-87021-976-4. OCLC 233144055.
- Tarrant, V. E. (1989). The U-Boat Offensive: 1914–1945. Annapolis, Maryland: Naval Institute Press. ISBN 978-0-87021-764-7. OCLC 20338385.
- Spindler, Arno (1966) [1932]. Der Handelskrieg mit U-Booten. 5 Vols. Berlin: Mittler & Sohn. Vols. 4+5, dealing with 1917+18, are very hard to find: Guildhall Library, London, has them all, also Vol. 1-3 in an English translation: The submarine war against commerce.
- Beesly, Patrick (1982). Room 40: British Naval Intelligence 1914-1918. London: H Hamilton. ISBN 978-0-241-10864-2.
- Halpern, Paul G. (1995). A Naval History of World War I. New York: Routledge. ISBN 978-1-85728-498-0.
- Roessler, Eberhard (1997). Die Unterseeboote der Kaiserlichen Marine. Bonn: Bernard & Graefe. ISBN 978-3-7637-5963-7.
- Schroeder, Joachim (2002). Die U-Boote des Kaisers. Bonn: Bernard & Graefe. ISBN 978-3-7637-6235-4.
- Koerver, Hans Joachim (2008). Room 40: German Naval Warfare 1914-1918. Vol I., The Fleet in Action. Steinbach: LIS Reinisch. ISBN 978-3-902433-76-3.
- Koerver, Hans Joachim (2009). Room 40: German Naval Warfare 1914-1918. Vol II., The Fleet in Being. Steinbach: LIS Reinisch. ISBN 978-3-902433-77-0.
