= SM U-67 =

Former German Imperial Navy submarine

History

German Empire
- Name: U-67
- Ordered: 2 February 1913
- Builder: Germaniawerft, Kiel
- Yard number: 204
- Laid down: 2 February 1913, as U-8 (Austria-Hungary)
- Launched: 15 May 1915
- Commissioned: 4 August 1915
- Fate: 20 November 1918 - Surrendered. Broken up at Fareham in 1921.

General characteristics
- Class & type: Type U 66 submarine
- Displacement: 791 t (779 long tons) surfaced; 933 t (918 long tons) submerged
- Length: 69.50 m (228 ft) (o/a); 54.66 m (179 ft 4 in) (pressure hull)
- Beam: 6.30 m (20 ft 8 in) (o/a); 4.15 m (13 ft 7 in) (pressure hull)
- Height: 7.95 m (26 ft 1 in)
- Draft: 3.79 m (12 ft 5 in)
- Propulsion: 1 × shaft; 2 × Germania 6-cylinder four-stroke diesel engines, 2,300 PS (2,300 shp; 1,700 kW) total; 2 × SSW electric motors, 1,240 PS (1,220 shp; 910 kW) total
- Speed: 16.8 knots (31.1 km/h; 19.3 mph) surfaced; 10.3 knots (19.1 km/h; 11.9 mph) submerged
- Range: 7,370 nmi (13,650 km; 8,480 mi) at 8 knots (15 km/h; 9.2 mph) surfaced; 115 nmi (213 km; 132 mi) at 4 knots (7.4 km/h; 4.6 mph) submerged
- Test depth: 50 m (160 ft)
- Complement: 4 officers, 32 enlisted men
- Armament: 5 × 45 cm (17.7 in) torpedo tubes (four bow, one stern); 12 torpedoes; 1 × 8.8 cm (3.5 in) SK L/30 deck gun, later replaced by 10.5 cm (4.1 in) SK L/45 deck gun

Service record
- Part of: IV Flottille; 28 October 1915 – 11 November 1918
- Commanders: Kptlt. Erich von Rosenberg-Grusczyski; 4 August 1915 – 15 March 1916; Kptlt. Hans Nieland; 16 March 1916 – 14 December 1917; Kptlt. Helmuth von Rabenau; 15 December 1917 – 15 September 1918
- Operations: 13 patrols
- Victories: 17 merchant ships sunk (39,720 GRT); 3 merchant ships damaged (14,766 GRT); 1 auxiliary warship damaged (4,282 GRT)

SM U-67 was a Type U 66 submarine or U-boat for the German Imperial Navy (German: Kaiserliche Marine) during the First World War. She had been laid down in November 1913 as U-8 the second boat of the U-7 class for the Austro-Hungarian Navy (German: Kaiserliche und Königliche (K.u.K.) Kriegsmarine) but was sold to Germany, along with the others in her class, in November 1914.

The submarine was ordered as U-8 from Germaniawerft of Kiel as the second of five boats of the U-7 class for the Austro-Hungarian Navy. After the outbreak of World War I in August 1914, the Austro-Hungarian Navy became convinced that none of the submarines of the class could be delivered to the Adriatic via Gibraltar. As a consequence, the entire class, including U-8, was sold to the German Imperial Navy in November 1914. Under German control, the class became known as the U 66 type and the boats were renumbered; U-8 became U-67, and all were redesigned and reconstructed to German specifications. U-67 was launched in May 1915 and commissioned in August. As completed, she displaced 791 tonnes (779 long tons), surfaced, and 933 tonnes (918 long tons), submerged. The boat was 69.50 metres (228 ft) long and was armed with five torpedo tubes and a deck gun.

A part of the IV Flotilla throughout the war, U-67 sank 17 ships with a combined gross register tonnage (GRT) of 39,720 in thirteen war patrols. She also damaged four other ships of 19,048 GRT. On 20 November 1918, nine days after the Armistice, U-67 was surrendered to the British. She was broken up in 1921 at Fareham.

== Design and construction ==
After the Austro-Hungarian Navy had competitively evaluated three foreign submarine designs, it selected the Germaniawerft 506d design, also known as the Type UD, for its new U-7 class of five submarines. The Navy ordered five boats on 1 February 1913.

The U-7 class was seen by the Austro-Hungarian Navy as an improved version of its U-3 class, which was also a Germaniawerft design. (Note: The U-3-class submarines, however, were less than half the displacement and nearly 90 feet (27 m) shorter than the U-7 design. See: Gardiner, pp. 342–43.) As designed for the Austro-Hungarian Navy, the boats were to displace 695 tonnes (684 long tons) on the surface and 885 tonnes (871 long tons) while submerged. The doubled-hulled boats were to be 69.50 metres (228 ft) long overall with a beam of 6.30 metres (20 ft 8 in) and a draft of 3.79 metres (12 ft 5 in). The Austrian specifications called for two shafts with twin diesel engines (2,300 metric horsepower (2,269 bhp; 1,692 kW) total) for surface running at up to 17 knots (31 km/h; 20 mph), and twin electric motors (1,240 PS (1,223 shp; 912 kW) total) for a maximum of 11 knots (20 km/h; 13 mph) when submerged. The boats were designed with five 45 cm (17.7 in) torpedo tubes; four located in the bow, one in the stern. The boats' armament was to also include a single 6.6 centimetres (2.6 in) L/26 deck gun.

U-8 and sister boat U-7 were both laid down on 1 November 1913, the first two boats of the class begun. Her construction was slated to be complete within 29 to 33 months.

Neither U-8 nor any of her sister boats were complete when World War I began in August 1914. With the boats under construction at Kiel, the Austrians became convinced that it would be impossible to take delivery of the boats, which would need to be towed into the Mediterranean past Gibraltar, a British territory. (Note: The Austro-Hungarian Navy's Germaniawerft-built U-3 class boats had been towed from Kiel to Pola via Gibraltar in 1909. See: Sieche, p. 19.) As a result, U-8 and her four sisters were sold to the Imperial German Navy on 28 November 1914. (Note: In April 1915, just five months later, the German U-21 successfully entered the Mediterranean through the Straits of Gibraltar, proving that delivery would have been possible after all. See: Gardiner, p. 343.)

U-8 was renumbered by the Germans as U-67 when her class was redesignated as the Type U 66. The Imperial German Navy had the submarines redesigned and reconstructed to German standards, which increased the surface displacement by 96 tonnes (94 long tons) and the submerged by 48 tonnes (47 long tons). The torpedo load was increased by a third, from 9 to 12, and the deck gun was upgraded from the 6.6 cm (2.6 in) gun originally specified to an 8.8 cm (3.5 in) Uk L/30 one.

== Service career ==
U-67 was launched on 15 May 1915. On 4 August, SM U-67 was commissioned into the Imperial German Navy under the command of Kapitänleutnant Erich von Rosenberg-Grusczyski. On 28 October 1915, U-67 was assigned to the IV. U-Halbflotille in which she remained for the duration of the war.

In March 1916, Kapitänleutnant Hans Nieland replaced von Rosenberg-Grusczyski as the captain of U-67, and it was under his command that U-67 was most successful, sinking 17 ships with a combined a total of 39,720 gross register tons (GRT), while damaging a further four of 19,048 GRT. U-67's most successful month was April 1917, when she sank four ships of 15,223 GRT in a span of twelve days. (Note: U-67 had also sunk four ships in February 1917 but with a lesser tonnage, 9,972 GRT.)

Nieland was succeeded as commander of U-67 by Oberleutnant zur See Helmuth von Rabenau in December 1917. Under his command during the last eleven months of the war, U-67 sank no more ships. During her service career under three commanders, U-67 had completed thirteen war patrols. She was surrendered to the British on 20 November 1918, nine days after the Armistice, and broken up at Fareham in 1921.

== Ships sunk or damaged ==
Ships sunk or damaged by SM U-67
Date	Name	Nationality	Tonnage	Fate
16 April 1916	Cardonia	United Kingdom	2,169	Sunk
20 April 1916	Whitgift	United Kingdom	4,397	Sunk
22 April 1916	Chanaral	France	2,423	Sunk
8 December 1916	HMS Intaba	Royal Navy	4,282	Damaged
28 January 1917	Daisy	Denmark	1,227	Sunk
29 January 1917	Punta Teno	Spain	1,042	Sunk
1 February 1917	Butron	Spain	2,434	Sunk
2 February 1917	Elikon	Greece	1,166	Sunk
5 February 1917	Lorton	Peru	1,419	Sunk
19 February 1917	Headley	United Kingdom	4,953	Sunk
17 April 1917	Kish	United Kingdom	4,928	Sunk
18 April 1917	Rhydwen	United Kingdom	4,799	Sunk
20 April 1917	Portloe	United Kingdom	3,187	Sunk
28 April 1917	Port Jackson	United Kingdom	2,309	Sunk
19 July 1917	Harrildsborg	Denmark	1,547	Sunk
24 July 1917	Viking	Sweden	873	Sunk
28 July 1917	Rigmor	Denmark	798	Sunk
15 September 1917	Idomeneus	United Kingdom	6,692	Damaged
21 November 1917	Breynton	United Kingdom	4,240	Damaged
22 November 1917	Redbridge	United Kingdom	3,834	Damaged
27 November 1917	Premier	United Kingdom	49	Sunk

== Bibliography ==
- Gardiner, Robert; Gray, Randal, eds. (1985). Conway's All the World's Fighting Ships 1906–1921. Annapolis, Maryland: Naval Institute Press. ISBN 978-0-87021-907-8. OCLC 12119866.
- Gröner, Erich; Jung, Dieter; Maass, Martin (1991). U-boats and Mine Warfare Vessels. German Warships 1815–1945. Vol. 2. Translated by Thomas, Keith; Magowan, Rachel. London: Conway Maritime Press. ISBN 0-85177-593-4.
- Sieche, Erwin F. (1980). "Austro-Hungarian Submarines". Warship, Volume 2. Naval Institute Press. ISBN 978-0-87021-976-4. OCLC 233144055.
- Tarrant, V. E. (1989). The U-Boat Offensive: 1914–1945. Annapolis, Maryland: Naval Institute Press. ISBN 978-0-87021-764-7. OCLC 20338385.
- Spindler, Arno (1966) [1932]. Der Handelskrieg mit U-Booten. 5 Vols. Berlin: Mittler & Sohn. Vols. 4+5, dealing with 1917+18, are very hard to find: Guildhall Library, London, has them all, also Vol. 1-3 in an English translation: The submarine war against commerce.
- Beesly, Patrick (1982). Room 40: British Naval Intelligence 1914-1918. London: H Hamilton. ISBN 978-0-241-10864-2.
- Halpern, Paul G. (1995). A Naval History of World War I. New York: Routledge. ISBN 978-1-85728-498-0.
- Roessler, Eberhard (1997). Die Unterseeboote der Kaiserlichen Marine. Bonn: Bernard & Graefe. ISBN 978-3-7637-5963-7.
- Schroeder, Joachim (2002). Die U-Boote des Kaisers. Bonn: Bernard & Graefe. ISBN 978-3-7637-6235-4.
- Koerver, Hans Joachim (2008). Room 40: German Naval Warfare 1914-1918. Vol I., The Fleet in Action. Steinbach: LIS Reinisch. ISBN 978-3-902433-76-3.
- Koerver, Hans Joachim (2009). Room 40: German Naval Warfare 1914-1918. Vol II., The Fleet in Being. Steinbach: LIS Reinisch. ISBN 978-3-902433-77-0.
