= SM U-68 =

Type U 66 German submarine (1915)

History

German Empire
- Name: U-68
- Ordered: 2 February 1913
- Builder: Germaniawerft, Kiel
- Yard number: 205
- Laid down: 31 December 1913, as U-9 (Austria-Hungary)
- Launched: 1 June 1915
- Commissioned: 17 August 1915
- Fate: Sunk 22 March 1916

General characteristics
- Class & type: Type U 66 submarine
- Displacement: 791 t (779 long tons) surfaced; 933 t (918 long tons) submerged
- Length: 69.50 m (228 ft) (o/a); 54.66 m (179 ft 4 in) (pressure hull)
- Beam: 6.30 m (20 ft 8 in) (o/a); 4.15 m (13 ft 7 in) (pressure hull)
- Height: 7.95 m (26 ft 1 in)
- Draft: 3.79 m (12 ft 5 in)
- Propulsion: 1 × shaft; 2 × Germania 6-cylinder four-stroke diesel engines, 2,300 PS (2,300 shp; 1,700 kW) total; 2 × Pichler & Co. double-acting electric motors, 1,240 PS (1,220 shp; 910 kW) total
- Speed: 16.8 knots (31.1 km/h; 19.3 mph) surfaced; 10.3 knots (19.1 km/h; 11.9 mph) submerged
- Range: 7,370 nmi (13,650 km; 8,480 mi) at 8 knots (15 km/h; 9.2 mph) surfaced; 115 nmi (213 km; 132 mi) at 4 knots (7.4 km/h; 4.6 mph) submerged
- Test depth: 50 m (160 ft)
- Complement: 4 officers, 32 enlisted men
- Armament: 5 × 45 cm (17.7 in) torpedo tubes (four bow, one stern); 12 torpedoes; 1 × 8.8 cm (3.5 in) SK L/30 deck gun, later replaced by 10.5 cm (4.1 in) SK L/45 deck gun

Service record
- Part of: IV Flotilla; 28 November 1915 – 22 March 1916
- Commanders: Kptlt. Ludwig Güntzel; 17 August 1915 – 22 March 1916
- Operations: 1 patrol
- Victories: None

SM U-68 was a Type U 66 submarine or U-boat for the German Imperial Navy (German: Kaiserliche Marine) during the First World War. She had been laid down in December 1913 as U-9 of the U-7 class for the Austro-Hungarian Navy (German: Kaiserliche und Königliche Kriegsmarine or K.u. K. Kriegsmarine) but was sold to Germany, along with the others in her class, in November 1914. Under German control, the class became known as the U 66 type and the boats were renumbered; U-9 became U-68, and was redesigned and reconstructed to German specifications. She was launched in June 1915 and commissioned in August.

Six days into her first war patrol, on 22 March 1916, U-68 was sunk by Farnborough, a British Q-ship, with all hands. U-68 sank no ships in her brief career. A post-war German study found fault with U-68's captain for not following established procedures for avoiding decoy ships.

== Design and construction ==
After the Austro-Hungarian Navy had competitively evaluated three foreign submarine designs, it selected the Germaniawerft 506d design, also known as the Type UD, for its new U-7 class of five submarines. The Navy ordered five boats on 1 February 1913.

The U-7 class was seen by the Austro-Hungarian Navy as an improved version of its U-3 class, which was also a Germaniawerft design. (Note: The U-3-class submarines, however, were less than half the displacement and nearly 90 feet (27 m) shorter than the U-7 design. See: Gardiner, pp. 342–43.) As designed for the Austro-Hungarian Navy, the boats were to displace 695 tonnes (684 long tons) on the surface and 885 tonnes (871 long tons) while submerged. The doubled-hulled boats were to be 69.50 metres (228 ft) long overall with a beam of 6.30 metres (20.7 ft) and a draft of 3.79 metres (12.4 ft). The Austrian specifications called for two shafts with twin diesel engines (2,300 metric horsepower (2,269 bhp; 1,692 kW) total) for surface running at up to 17 knots (31 km/h; 20 mph), and twin electric motors (1,240 PS (1,220 shp; 910 kW) total) for a maximum of 11 knots (20 km/h; 13 mph) when submerged. The boats were designed with five 45 cm (17.7 in) torpedo tubes; four located in the bow, one in the stern. The boats' armament was to also include a single 6.6 cm (2.6 in) L/26 deck gun.

U-9 was laid down on 31 December 1913, the third of the U-7 boats. Her construction was slated to be complete within 29 to 33 months. Neither U-9 nor any of her sister boats were complete when World War I began in August 1914. With the boats under construction at Kiel, the Austrians became convinced that it would be impossible to take delivery of the boats, which would need to be towed into the Mediterranean past Gibraltar, a British territory. (Note: The Austro-Hungarian Navy's Germaniawerft-built U-3-class boats had been towed from Kiel to Pola via Gibraltar in 1909. See: Sieche, p. 19.) As a result, U-9 and her four sisters were sold to the Imperial German Navy on 28 November 1914. (Note: In April 1915, just five months later, the German U-21 successfully entered the Mediterranean through the Straits of Gibraltar, proving that delivery would have been possible after all. See: Gardiner, p. 343.)

U-9 was renumbered by the Germans as U-68 when her class was redesignated as the Type U 66. The Imperial German Navy had the submarines redesigned and reconstructed to German standards, which increased the surface displacement by 96 tonnes (94 long tons) and the submerged by 48 tonnes (47 long tons). The torpedo load was increased by a third, from 9 to 12, and the deck gun was upgraded from the 6.6 cm (2.6 in) gun originally specified to an 8.8 cm (3.5 in) SK L/30 one.

== Service career ==
U-68 was launched on 1 June 1915. On 17 August, SM U-68 was commissioned into the Imperial German Navy under the command of Kapitänleutnant Ludwig Güntzel, a new submarine commander. On 29 November, U-68 was assigned to the IV. U-Halbflotille.

U-68 departed the Ems on 16 March 1916 to begin her first war patrol. Headed to her assigned operating area off Britain's west coast, Güntzel and U-68 came across Farnborough, a British Q-ship—in appearance unarmed—under the command of Gordon Campbell. At approximately 07:00, U-68 fired a torpedo at Farnborough and narrowly missed the ship's bow. Farnborough continued the deception and continued on at her same speed and course. At 07:20, U-68 surfaced about 1,000 yards (910 m) astern of Farnborough, moved to the ship's port quarter, and fired a shot across the Q-ship's bow.

Farnborough stopped, blew off steam, and launched a boat to simulate a surrender. As U-68 closed to 800 yards (730 m), Farnborough raised the White Ensign, uncovered her guns and opened fire with three of her five 12-pounder (76 mm) guns. The British gunners scored several hits on the U-boat out of 21 rapidly fired rounds. As U-68 began to sink, Campbell steered Farnborough over U-68's location and dropped a depth charge that blew the bow of the submarine out of the water. As U-68 began going down by the stern, Farnborough's gunners scored another five hits on the U-boat's conning tower. U-68 sank with the loss of all 38 men at position 51°54′N 10°53′W off Dingle in southern Ireland. U-68 sank no ships during her brief service career.

A post-war German study faulted U-68's commander, Kptlt. Güntzel, for failing to follow established procedures for dealing with neutral-flagged vessels in order to avoid decoy ships like Farnborough. According to the report, Güntzel had broken almost all the rules when approaching Farnborough. However, Kommodore Hermann Bauer, the commander of the German High Seas Fleet U-boats, in his post-war memoirs, reports Güntzel was an inexperienced captain and had not, contrary to usual practice, been first sent to sea under a more experienced U-boat captain to gain knowledge.

== Bibliography ==
- Gardiner, Robert; Gray, Randal, eds. (1985). Conway's All the World's Fighting Ships 1906–1921. Annapolis, Maryland: Naval Institute Press. ISBN 978-0-87021-907-8. OCLC 12119866.
- Gröner, Erich; Jung, Dieter; Maass, Martin (1991). German Warships 1815–1945, U-boats and Mine Warfare Vessels. Vol. 2. Translated by Thomas, Keith; Magowan, Rachel. London: Conway Maritime Press. ISBN 0-85177-593-4.
- Messimer, Dwight R. (2002). Verschollen: World War I U-boat losses. Annapolis, Maryland: Naval Institute Press. ISBN 978-1-55750-475-3. OCLC 231973419.
- Sieche, Erwin F. (1980). "Austro-Hungarian Submarines". Warship, Volume 2. Annapolis, Maryland: Naval Institute Press. ISBN 978-0-87021-976-4. OCLC 233144055.
- Tarrant, V. E. (1989). The U-Boat Offensive: 1914–1945. Annapolis, Maryland: Naval Institute Press. ISBN 978-0-87021-764-7. OCLC 20338385.
- Spindler, Arno (1966) [1932]. Der Handelskrieg mit U-Booten. 5 Vols. Berlin: Mittler & Sohn. Vols. 4+5, dealing with 1917+18, are very hard to find: Guildhall Library, London, has them all, also Vol. 1–3 in an English translation: The submarine war against commerce.
- Beesly, Patrick (1982). Room 40: British Naval Intelligence 1914–1918. London: H Hamilton. ISBN 978-0-241-10864-2.
- Halpern, Paul G. (1995). A Naval History of World War I. New York: Routledge. ISBN 978-1-85728-498-0.
- Roessler, Eberhard (1997). Die Unterseeboote der Kaiserlichen Marine. Bonn: Bernard & Graefe. ISBN 978-3-7637-5963-7.
- Schroeder, Joachim (2002). Die U-Boote des Kaisers. Bonn: Bernard & Graefe. ISBN 978-3-7637-6235-4.
- Koerver, Hans Joachim (2008). Room 40: German Naval Warfare 1914–1918. Vol I., The Fleet in Action. Steinbach: LIS Reinisch. ISBN 978-3-902433-76-3.
- Koerver, Hans Joachim (2009). Room 40: German Naval Warfare 1914–1918. Vol II., The Fleet in Being. Steinbach: LIS Reinisch. ISBN 978-3-902433-77-0.
