= Type U 66 submarine =

German submarine type

Class overview
- Builders: Germaniawerft, Kiel
- Operators: Imperial German Navy
- Preceded by: German Type U 63 submarine
- Succeeded by: German Type UE I submarine
- Built: 1913–15
- In commission: 1915–18
- Completed: 5
- Lost: 3
- Scrapped: 2
- Preserved: 0

General characteristics (as U-7 class)
- Type: submarine
- Displacement: 695 long tons (706 t) surfaced; 885 long tons (899 t) submerged
- Length: 228 ft (69.50 m) (o/a)
- Beam: 20 ft 8 in (6.30 m)
- Draft: 12 ft 5 in (3.79 m)
- Propulsion: 1 × shaft; 2 × Germania 6-cylinder four-stroke diesel engines, 2,269 shp (1,692 kW) total; 2 × SSW electric motors, 1,223 shp (912 kW) total
- Speed: 17 knots (31 km/h; 20 mph) surfaced; 11 knots (20 km/h; 13 mph) submerged
- Range: 1,200 nautical miles (2,200 km; 1,400 mi) at 12 knots (22 km/h; 14 mph); 100 nmi (190 km; 120 mi) at 4 knots (7.4 km/h; 4.6 mph)
- Complement: unknown
- Armament: 5 × 45 cm (17.7 in) torpedo tubes (four bow, one stern); 9 torpedoes; 1 × 6.6 cm (2.6 in) L/26 deck gun

General characteristics (as Type U 66)
- Type: submarine
- Displacement: 791 t (779 long tons) surfaced; 933 t (918 long tons) submerged
- Length: 69.50 m (228 ft) (o/a); 54.66 m (179 ft 4 in) (pressure hull)
- Beam: 6.30 m (20 ft 8 in) (o/a); 4.15 m (13 ft 7 in) (pressure hull)
- Height: 7.95 m (26 ft 1 in)
- Draft: 3.79 m (12 ft 5 in)
- Installed power: 2 × Germania 6-cylinder four-stroke diesel engines, 2,300 PS (1,692 kW; 2,269 shp) total; 2 × electric motors, 1,260 PS (927 kW; 1,243 shp) total
- Propulsion: 1 × shaft, 1 × 1.80 m (5 ft 11 in) propeller
- Speed: 16.8 knots (31.1 km/h; 19.3 mph) surfaced; 10.3 knots (19.1 km/h; 11.9 mph) submerged
- Range: 7,370 nmi (13,650 km; 8,480 mi) at 8 knots (15 km/h; 9.2 mph) surfaced; 115 nmi (213 km; 132 mi) at 4 knots (7.4 km/h; 4.6 mph) submerged
- Test depth: 50 m (160 ft)
- Complement: 4 officers, 32 enlisted men
- Armament: 5 × 45 cm (17.7 in) torpedo tubes (four bow, one stern); 12 torpedoes; 1 × 8.8 cm (3.5 in) SK L/30 deck gun, later replaced by 10.5 cm (4.1 in) SK L/45 deck gun

The Type U 66 was a class of five submarines or U-boats operated by the German Imperial Navy (German: Kaiserliche Marine) during World War I. The class is alternately referred to as the U-66 class or the Type UD. The class was built by Germaniawerft of Kiel to their 506d design as the U-7 class for the Austro-Hungarian Navy. The five boats were sold to the Imperial Germany Navy at the beginning of World War I when it was thought impossible for the submarines to reach the Mediterranean for delivery to Austria-Hungary.

The Austro-Hungarian Navy, after competitively evaluating six submarines of three foreign designs, selected the Germaniwerft 506d or Type UD design over a design from Whitehead & Co. for the U-7 class. The boats, numbered U-7 to U-11, were designed to be 69.50 m (228 ft 0 in) long and displace between 695 and 885 tonnes (684 and 871 long tons) when surfaced and submerged. They were to be armed with five torpedo tubes and a deck gun. For propulsion the design called for twin diesel engines for surface running and twin electric motors for subsurface movement. The Austro-Hungarian Navy ordered the boats in February 1913 and construction began on the first boats in November.

After the outbreak of World War I in August 1914, the Austro-Hungarian Navy became convinced that delivery of the still-unfinished submarines to the Mediterranean via Gibraltar would be impossible. As a result, they sold the five boats to the Imperial German Navy in November 1914. The German Navy assigned the numbers U-66 to U-70 to the five submarines and had them redesigned and reconstructed to their specifications. These changes, which included a larger deck gun, increased the displacement of the U-boats by almost 100 tonnes (98 long tons) surfaced and nearly 50 tonnes (49 long tons) submerged.

All five boats saw active service, and four sank 15 or more ships. Only U-68, sunk six days into her first war patrol in March 1916, had no successes. Two other boats, U-66 and U-69 disappeared in 1917. The remaining two U-boats, U-67 and U-70, were surrendered to the United Kingdom and were broken up by 1921.

== Background ==
In 1904, the Austro-Hungarian Navy, after allowing the navies of other countries to pioneer submarine developments, ordered the Austrian Naval Technical Committee (German: Marinetechnisches Komitee or MTK) to produce a submarine design. When the Navy rejected the January 1905 MTK design and other designs submitted as part of a public competition as impracticable, they instead opted to order two submarines each of designs by Simon Lake, Germaniawerft, and John Philip Holland for a competitive evaluation. (Note: The Lake design became the Austro-Hungarian U-1 class, the Germaniawerft design became the U-3 class, and the Holland design became the U-5 class.)

Based on the trials results, the Austro-Hungarian Navy determined the characteristics that the next generation of Austro-Hungarian submarines should have. They were looking for a double-hulled submarine of about 500 tonnes (490 long tons) displacement with diesel propulsion. They also wanted a surface speed of 16–18 knots (30–33 km/h; 18–21 mph), and for the boat to be armed with between three and five 45 cm (17.7 in) torpedo tubes. The Austro-Hungarian Navy selected the Germaniawerft 506d design, also known as the Type UD, for the U-7 class over the Type 48 design submitted by Whitehead & Co., primarily because of the lower cost. The Navy ordered five boats on 1 February 1913.

== Design ==
The U-7 class was seen by the Austro-Hungarian Navy as an improved version of its U-3 class, which was also a Germaniawerft design. (Note: The U-3-class submarines, however, were less than half the displacement and nearly 90 feet (27 m) shorter than the U-7 design. See: Gardiner, pp. 342–43.) As designed for the Austro-Hungarian Navy, the boats were to displace 695 tonnes (684 long tons) on the surface and 885 tonnes (871 long tons) while submerged. The doubled-hulled boats were to be 69.50 m (228 ft 0 in) long overall with a beam of 6.30 m (20 ft 8 in) and a draft of 3.79 m (12 ft 5 in). The Austrian specifications called for two shafts with twin diesel engines (2,300 metric horsepower; 2,269 bhp; 1,692 kW total) for surface running at up to 17 knots (31 km/h; 20 mph), and twin electric motors (1,240 PS; 1,223 shp; 912 kW total) for a maximum of 11 knots (20 km/h; 13 mph) when submerged.

The boats were designed with five 45 cm (17.7 in) torpedo tubes; four located in the bow, one in the stern. The boats' armament was to also include a single 6.6 cm (2.6 in)/26 deck gun.

== Construction ==
After the Austro-Hungarian Navy's 1 February 1913 order, the first two boats, U-7 and U-8, were laid down at Germaniawerft on 1 November. U-9 was laid down at the end of December, and the final two boats, U-10 and U-11 were both begun in February 1914. Construction of the boats was slated to be complete within 29 to 33 months.

None of the submarines were complete when World War I began in August 1914. With the boats under construction at Kiel, the Austrians became convinced that it would be impossible to take delivery of the boats, which would need to be towed into the Mediterranean past Gibraltar, a British territory. (Note: The Germaniawerft-built U-3-class boats had been towed from Kiel to Pola via Gibraltar in 1909. See: Sieche, p. 19.) As a result, the five boats of the class were transferred to the Imperial German Navy on 28 November 1914 after the advance payment of 2 million Kronen had been returned. (Note: In April 1915, just five months later, the German U-21 successfully entered the Mediterranean through the Straits of Gibraltar, proving that delivery would have been possible after all. See: Gardiner, p. 343.) Germaniawerft was then awarded Kriegsauftrag D, hence the type was known as UD.

After their purchase, the boats were assigned the numbers U-66 to U-70, and the class became known as the U 66 type. The Imperial German Navy had the submarines redesigned and reconstructed to German standards, which increased the surface displacement by 96 tonnes (94 long tons) and the submerged by 48 tonnes (47 long tons). The torpedo load was increased by a third, from 9 to 12, and the deck gun was upgraded from the 6.6 cm (2.6 in) gun originally specified to an 8.8 cm (3.5 in) SK L/30 one.

U-66 was launched on 22 April 1915, the first of the class, and was followed by the other four about one every three weeks, with the last boat, U-70, hitting the water on 20 July. The boats were all completed and commissioned into the Imperial German Navy between July and September.

== Service career ==
All the boats of the U-66 class saw active service, and all but one boat, U-68, had wartime successes; U-69 and U-70 both sank over 100,000 GRT of Allied shipping. U-68 was sunk by the British Q-ship HMS Farnborough in March 1916, and was the first boat of the class to be lost during the war. U-69 and U-66 were lost in July and September 1917, respectively. U-67 and U-70 both survived the war and were surrendered to the United Kingdom in November 1918, and both were broken up by 1921.

== Boats in class ==
=== SM U-66 ===
U-66, the lead boat of the class, was laid down on 1 November 1913 (yard number 203) by Germaniawerft at Kiel and launched on 22 April 1915. She was commissioned on 23 July 1915 under the command of Kapitänleutnant Thorwald von Bothmer. During the war, she sank 25 ships totaling 73,847 gross register tons (GRT). The two largest ships she sank were the British steamers Powhatan (6,117 GRT) and Bay State (6,583 GRT), both sunk in 1917. U-66 was last heard from on 3 September 1917 when she reported her position in the North Sea. Her fate is officially unknown. British records suggest that U-66 may have struck a mine or been sunk by destroyers, this is not borne out by German records.

=== SM U-67 ===
U-67 was laid down on 1 November 1913 (yard number 204) by Germaniawerft at Kiel and launched on 15 May 1915. She was commissioned on 4 August 1915 under the command of Korvettenkapitän Erich von Rosenberg-Grusczyski. U-67 sank a total of 17 ships (39,720 GRT) and damaged a further four (19,048 GRT). U-67 was surrendered to the United Kingdom on 20 November 1918 and was broken up at Fareham in 1921.

=== SM U-68 ===
U-68 was laid down on 31 December 1913 (yard number 205) by Germaniawerft at Kiel and launched on 1 June 1915. She was commissioned on 17 August 1915 under the command of Kapitänleutnant Ludwig Güntzel. Six days into her first war patrol, U-68 encountered the British Q-ship HMS Farnborough (Q-ship number five) off Dingle and was sunk with all hands. U-68 sank no ships during her brief service career.

=== SM U-69 ===
U-69 was laid down on 7 February 1914 (yard number 206) by Germaniawerft at Kiel and launched on 24 June 1915. She was commissioned on 4 September 1915 under the command of Kapitänleutnant Ernst Wilhelms. During her service career, U-69 sank 31 ships with a combined gross register tonnage of 102,875, the largest among them, the 13,441 GRT armed merchant cruiser Avenger. U-69 was last heard from on 11 July 1917 when she reported being off the coast of Norway. Her fate is officially unknown, even though British reports credit her sinking to destroyer HMS Patriot. The dates in German records, however, do not support this claim.

=== SM U-70 ===
U-70 was laid down on 11 February 1914 (yard number 207) by Germaniawerft at Kiel and launched on 20 July 1915. She was commissioned on 22 September 1915 under the command of Kapitänleutnant Otto Wünsche. During the war, Wünsche and U-70 sank one warship, the British sloop HMS Rhododendron, and 53 civilian ships totaling 137,774 GRT. Among the civilian ships was Southland, at 11,899 GRT, one of the largest ships hit by U-boats during the war. U-70 also damaged five ships of 24,971 GRT. U-70 was surrendered to the British on 20 November 1918 and was broken up at Bo'ness in 1919–20.

== Bibliography ==
- Gardiner, Robert, ed. (1985). Conway's All the World's Fighting Ships 1906–1921. Annapolis, Maryland: Naval Institute Press. ISBN 978-0-87021-907-8. OCLC 12119866.
- Gröner, Erich; Jung, Dieter; Maass, Martin (1991). German Warships 1815–1945, U-boats and Mine Warfare Vessels. Vol. 2. Translated by Thomas, Keith; Magowan, Rachel. London: Conway Maritime Press. ISBN 0-85177-593-4.
- Messimer, Dwight R. (2002). Verschollen: World War I U-boat losses. Annapolis, Maryland: Naval Institute Press. ISBN 978-1-55750-475-3. OCLC 231973419.
- Sieche, Erwin F. (1980). "Austro-Hungarian Submarines". Warship, Volume 2. Naval Institute Press. ISBN 978-0-87021-976-4. OCLC 233144055.
- Tennent, A. J. (2006) [1990]. British Merchant Ships Sunk by U boats in the 1914–1918 War. Penzance: Periscope Publishing. ISBN 1-904381-36-7.
