= December 1916 =

Month in 1916

<<	December 1916					>>
Su	Mo	Tu	We	Th	Fr	Sa
					1	2
3	4	5	6	7	8	9
10	11	12	13	14	15	16
17	18	19	20	21	22	23
24	25	26	27	28	29	30
31

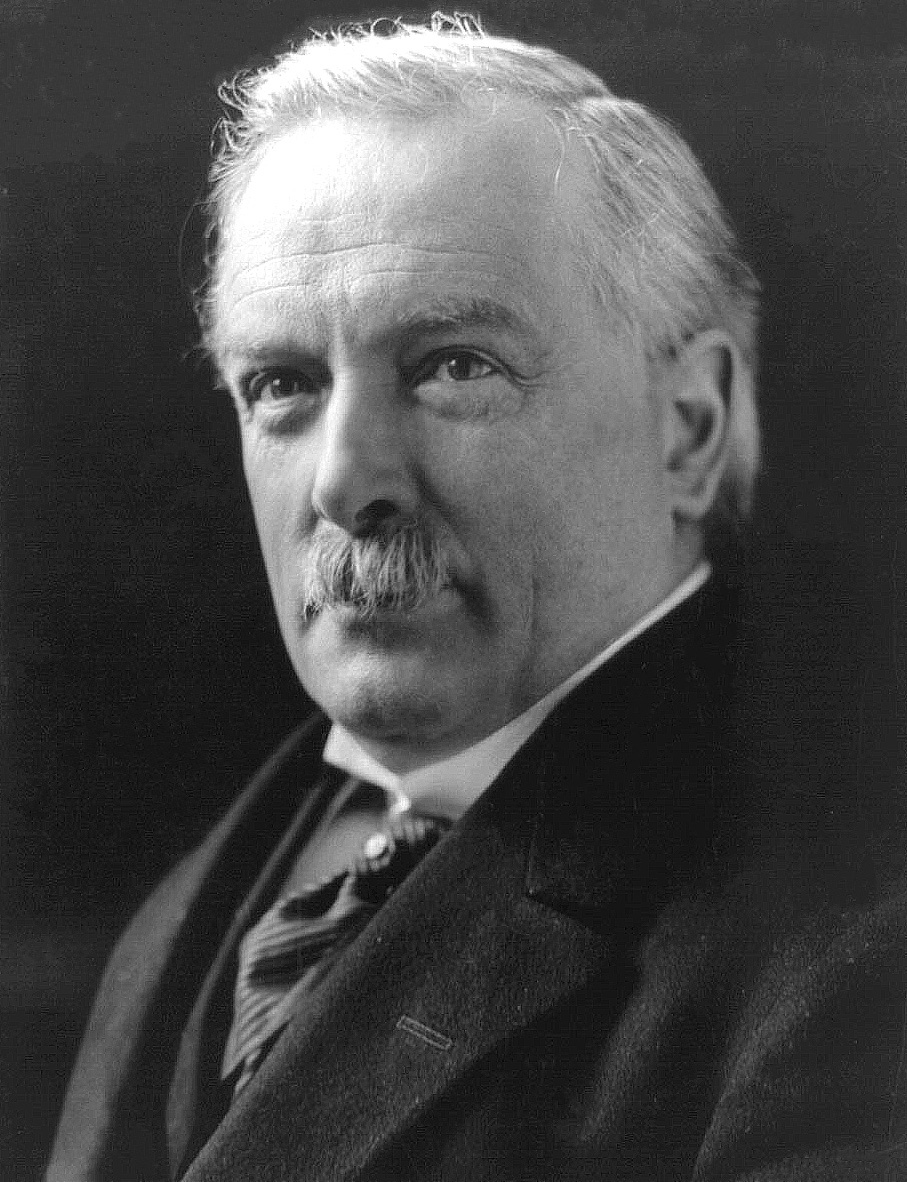
David Lloyd George, new Prime Minister of the United Kingdom

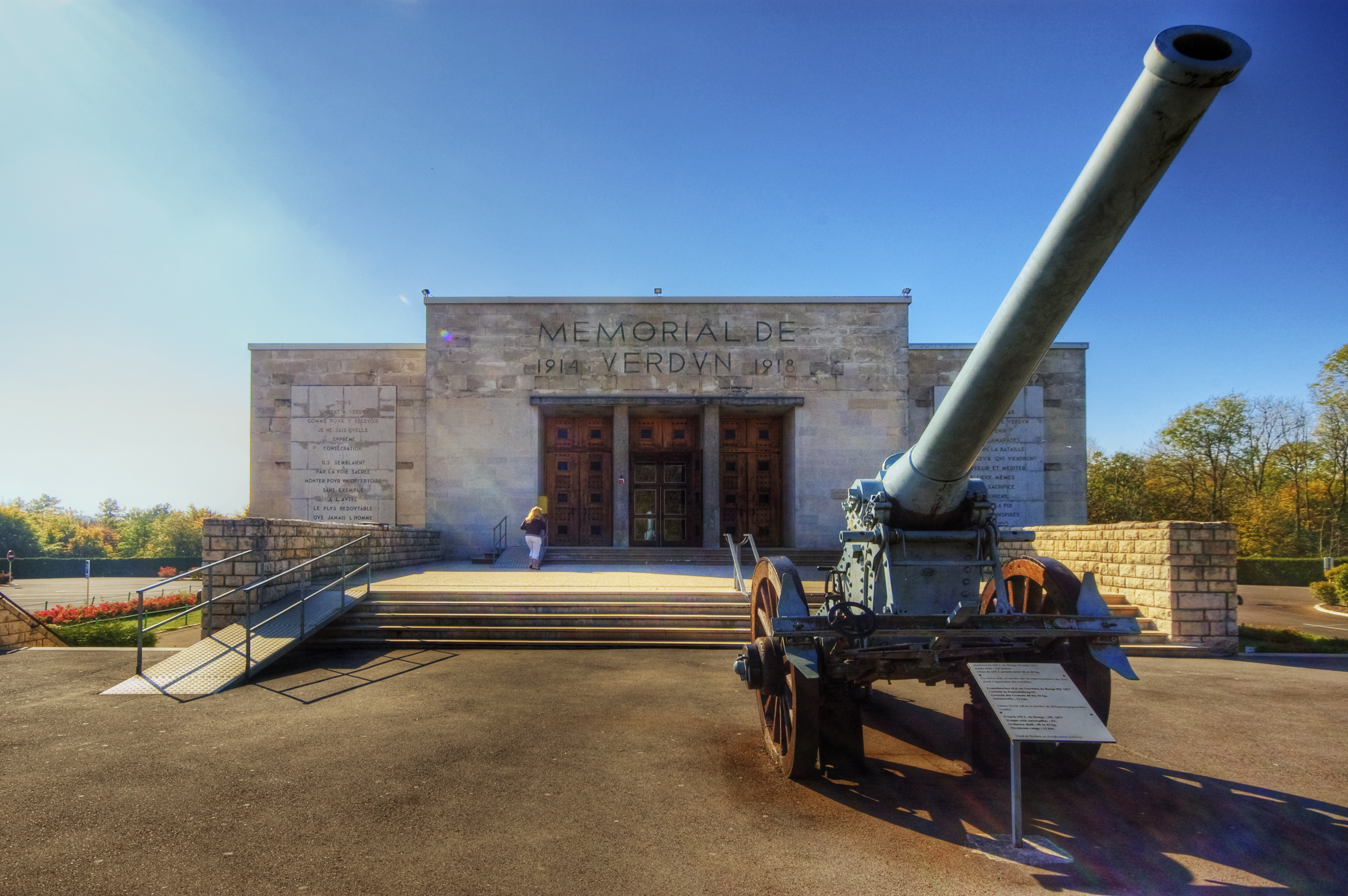
Verdun Memorial on the battlefield near Fleury-devant-Douaumont

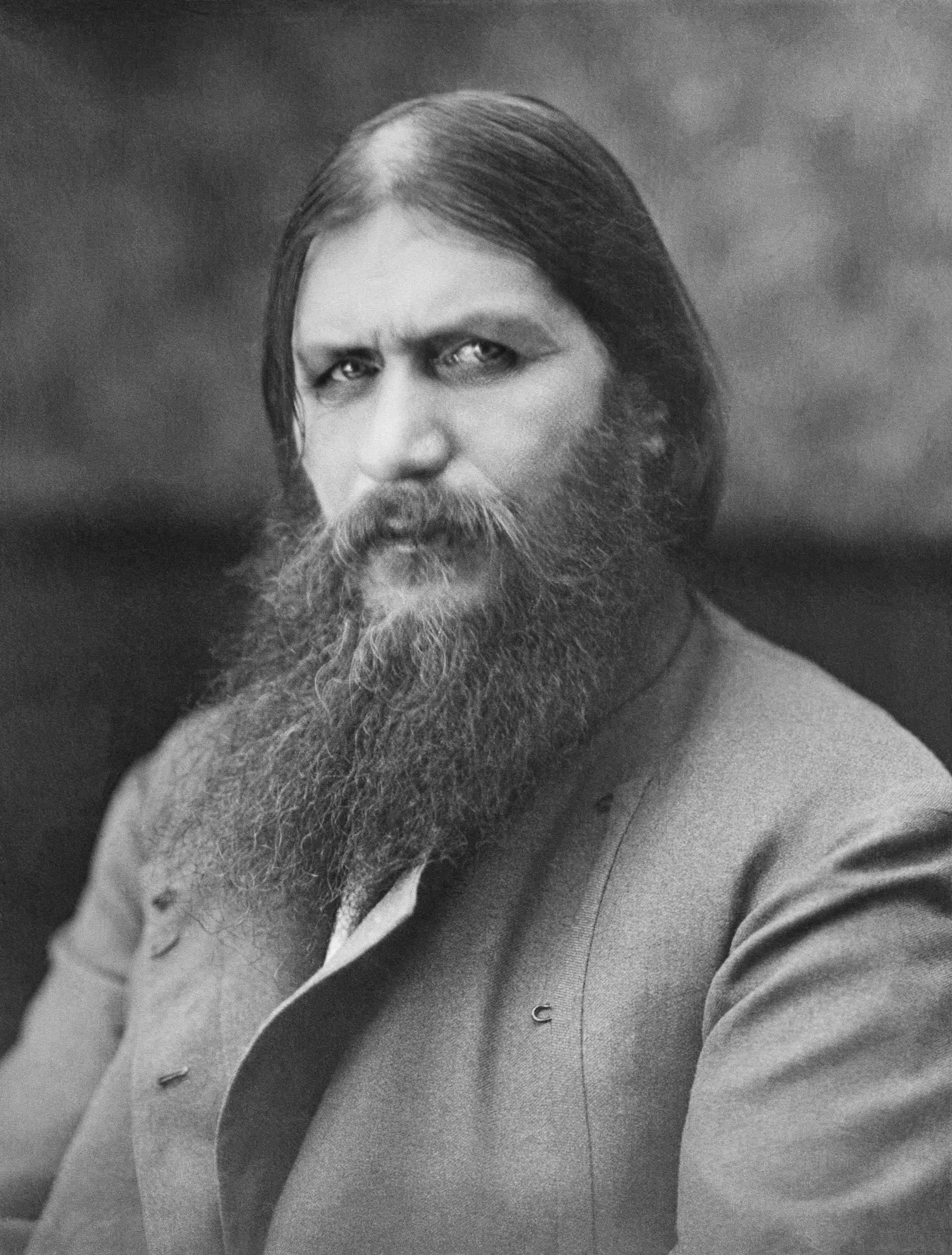
Grigori Rasputin, murdered

The following events occurred in December 1916:

== December 1, 1916 (Friday) ==
- Battle of the Argeș – The Romanian force of 150,000 attacked the Danube Army of 250,000 men under command of German General Erich Ludendorff southwest of the Romanian capital of Bucharest and nearly surrounded the Central Powers force.
- Capture of Yanbu – Ottoman forces under command of Fakhri Pasha attempted to capture the British-held port of Yanbu on the Red Sea.
- An Order in Council authorized an increase of Canadian troops to 500,000 for World War I.
- A side collision between an express train and passenger train in Herceghalom, Hungary killed 69 people, the deadliest rail disaster in the country's history.
- British submarine HMS E37 was lost in the North Sea with all 30 of her crew.
- French Catholic missionary Charles de Foucauld, the founder of Little Brothers of Jesus was shot dead during an attempted abduction by bandits from a fort constructed to protect the Tuareg people in Algeria. His death was considered a martyrdom and he was beatified by Pope Benedict XVI in 2005.
- An armed confrontation in Athens between the Kingdom of Greece and the Allied Powers, arising from a dispute over Greece's neutrality in World War I, followed by reprisals and riots against Greek supporters of the Allies marking the height of the National Schism.
- Born: Wan Li, Chinese statesman, Vice Premier of the People's Republic of China from 1983 to 1988 and Chairman of the Standing Committee of the National People's Congress from 1988 to 1993, in Dongping County, Shandong, Republic of China (present-day China) (d. 2015)
- Died: Lajos Thallóczy, 58, Hungarian public servant, adviser to Franz Joseph I of Austria on all Balkan affairs (b. 1857)

== December 2, 1916 (Saturday) ==
- Battle of the Argeș – Also known at the Battle of Bucharest, the 6th Turkish Infantry Division was mobilized to aid the surrounded Germans southwest of the Romanian capital.
- Twelve members of the Industrial Workers of the World, known as the Sydney Twelve, were convicted of conspiring to commit arson and sedition in Sydney.
- Born:
  - Nancye Wynne Bolton, Australian tennis player, six-time winner of the Australian Open; as Nancye Wynne, in Melbourne, Australia (d. 2001)
  - Cecil E. Harris, American naval fighter pilot, flying ace with 15 downed aircraft during World War II, recipient of the Navy Cross and Medal of Honor; in Faulkton, South Dakota, United States (d. 1981)
  - John Bentley, English actor, best known for the 1970s TV series African Patrol and the British soap opera Crossroads; in Birmingham, United States (d. 2009)
  - Howard Finster, American folk artist, created over 46,000 art pieces for his "Paradise Gardens" sculpture garden in Summerville, Georgia, and later album covers for R.E.M. and Talking Heads; in Valley Head, Alabama, United States (d. 2001)
- Died: Paolo Tosti, 70, Italian composer, credited for popularizing salon music during the Belle Époque era with songs such as "Serenata", "Addio" and "Ancora" (b. 1846)

== December 3, 1916 (Sunday) ==
- Battle of the Argeș – Both the intervention by Ottoman forces and slowed reinforcements on the Romanian side caused the attack to weaken against the Germans, allowing them to break out and route the counterattack.
- Capture of Yanbu – Arab forces retreated into the city limits of Yanbu and Ottoman forces surrounded them, but managed to build an emergency airstrip that allowed British aircraft to resupply the defenders until reinforcements arrived.
- Battle of Funchal – French submarine carrier Kanguroo was torpedoed and sunk in the port of Funchal by German submarine SM U-38, along with two accompanying ships. In all, 41 sailors died in the attack.
- Died: William Walker Scranton, 72, American business executive, president of the Lackawanna Steel Company, son to George W. Scranton (b. 1844)

== December 4, 1916 (Monday) ==
- French fighter ace Charles Nungesser shot down a German airplane piloted by fighter ace Hans Schilling over Flesquières, France, killing him and his co-pilot.
- The Bratsberg Line rail began operating between Eidanger and Notodden, Norway.
- The final property of the Whitewater Shaker Settlement was sold, dissolving the Shaker settlement near New Haven, Hamilton County, Ohio. Many of the original sites were purchased by the Great Parks of Hamilton County and are registered under the National Register of Historic Places.
- Born:
  - Balwant Gargi, Indian writer, best known for his plays and novels in the Punjabi language including Rival Women and The Naked Triangle; in Bathinda, British India (present-day India) (d. 2003)
  - Gong Qiuxia, Chinese singer, pioneer of Mandopop, in Chongming, Republic of China (present-day China) (d. 2004)
- Died: Preston Lea, 75, American politician, 52nd Governor of Delaware (b. 1841)

== December 5, 1916 (Tuesday) ==
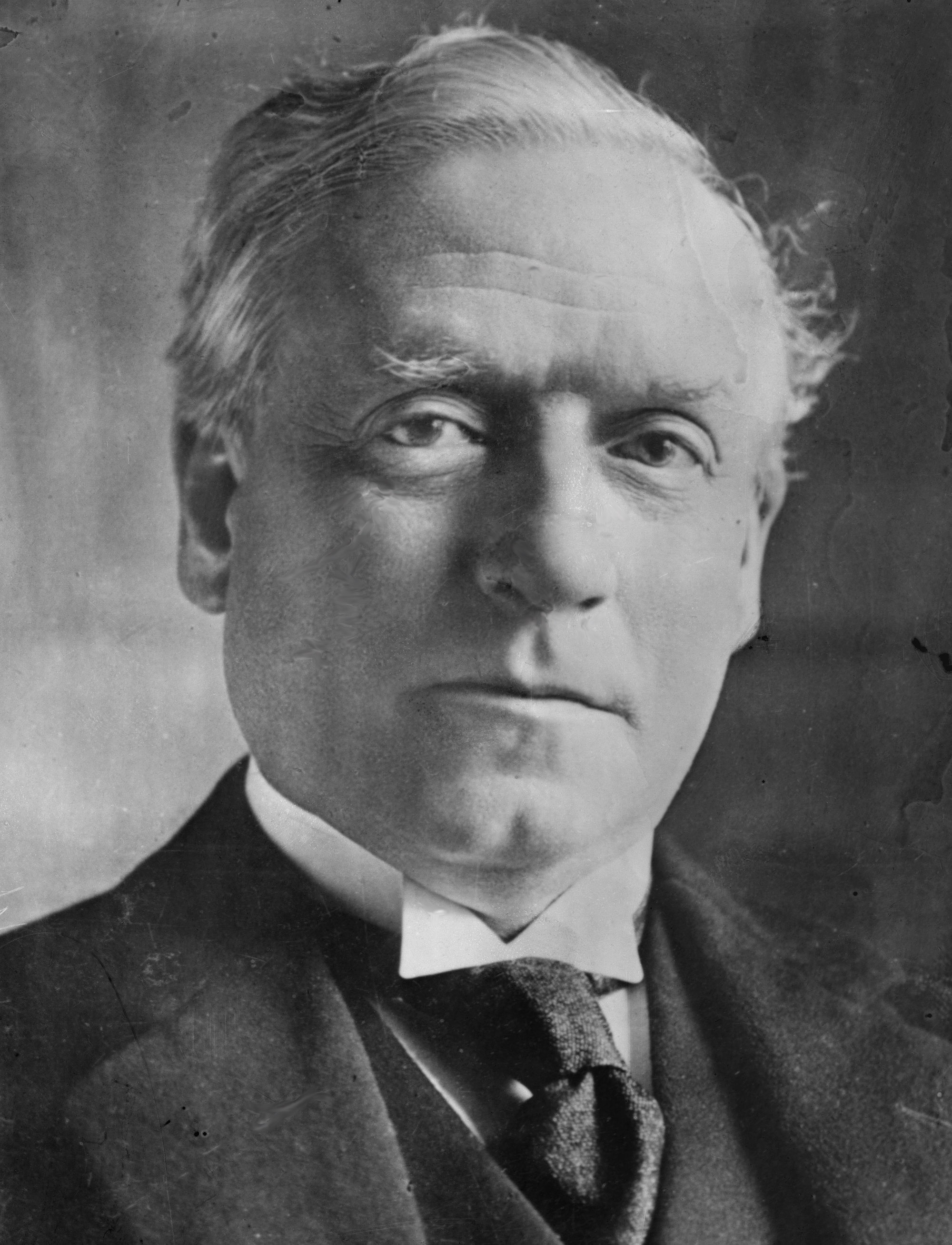
H. H. Asquith resigns as Prime Minister

- An explosion at Barnbow, a munitions factory near Leeds, killed 35 female workers and injured hundreds more.
- British Prime Minister H. H. Asquith resigned from office, allowing War Minister David Lloyd George to succeed him (on December 7) while Edward Stanley took over the ministry (on December 11).
- U.S. President Woodrow Wilson delivered the State of the Union Address to the 64th United States Congress, the first presidential address after winning re-election in November.
- The last recorded stagecoach robbery occurred in Jarbidge, Nevada where wagon driver Fred Searcy was ambushed by Ben Kuhl, a known horse thief, along with Ed Beck and William McGraw. The three men robbed $4,000 from a mining payroll transported on the coach and shot Searcy dead. The three were arrested shortly after and Kuhl was tried and convicted of Searcy's murder.
- U.S. Navy destroyer USS Allen was launched by Bath Iron Works in Bath, Maine and would serve in both world wars.
- The chamber opera Sāvitri by Gustav Holst premiered at Wellington Hall in London.
- Born:
  - Paul Aste, Austrian bobsledder and luger, seven-time medalist in the European Luge Championships and two-time World Championships medalist for bobsled; in Matrei in Osttirol, Austria-Hungary (present-day Austria) (date of death unknown)
  - Hilary Koprowski, Polish-American virologist and immunologist, inventor of the first effective live polio vaccine; in Warsaw, Government General of Warsaw (present-day Poland) (d. 2013)
  - Abby Marlatt, American academic and activist, leading proponent of civil rights in Lexington, Kentucky; in Manhattan, Kansas, United States (d. 2010)
- Died:
  - Princess Augusta, 94, British noble, member of the Royal Family, granddaughter of George III (b. 1822)
  - George Boldt, 65, German-American business executive, president of the Waldorf–Astoria Hotel Company from 1897 to 1916 (b. 1851)
  - Hans Richter, 73, Austrian-Hungarian conductor, first to conduct The Ring Cycle by Richard Wagner (b. 1843)

== December 6, 1916 (Wednesday) ==
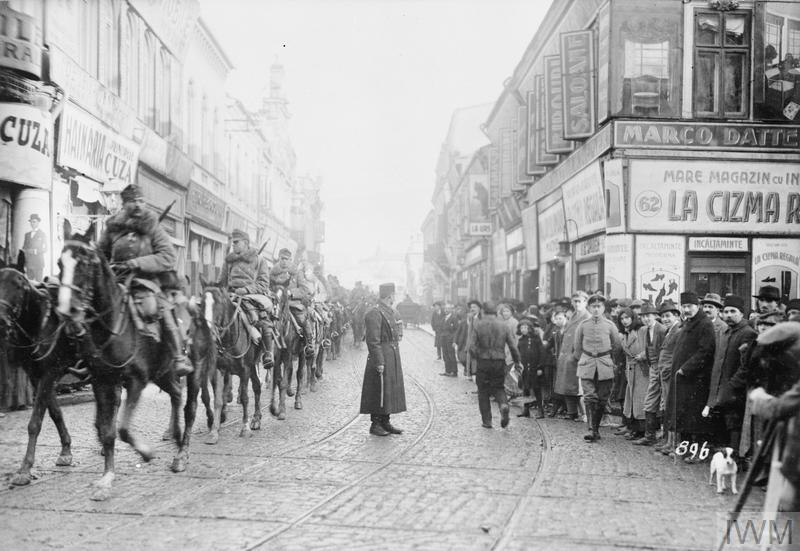
Austro-Hungarian cavalry entering Bucharest on 6 December 1916

- The Germans occupied Bucharest, forcing the capital of Romania to be moved to Iaşi. In total, the Romanian army lost 40 percent of its 150,000 force in battles against the Central Powers.
- Royal Navy HMS Ariel sank German submarine SM UC-19 using depth charges in the English Channel, killing all 25 crew on board.
- German raiding ship SMS Möwe captured and scuttled Canadian cargo ship Mount Temple in the Atlantic Ocean north of the Azores Islands. The cargo included military equipment, cavalry horses, and newly discovered fossils of the dinosaur Corythosaurus en route to the British Museum.
- Born: Kristján Eldjárn, Icelandic state leader, 3rd President of Iceland; in Svarfaðardalur, Iceland (d. 1982)
- Died:
  - John Dustin Archbold, 68, American industrialist, vice-president of Standard Oil and president of the Standard Oil New Jersey, the precursor for Esso (b. 1848)
  - Powhatan Beaty, 79, American soldier, member of the 5th United States Colored Infantry Regiment, recipient for the Medal of Honor for taking command of his unit during the Battle of Chaffin's Farm (b. 1837)

== December 7, 1916 (Thursday) ==
- German submarine SM UB-46 struck a mine and sank in the Black Sea with the loss of all 20 crew.
- Born: John Wilmer Browning Barr, Canadian physician, 24th Surgeon General of Canada; in Lanark, Ontario, Canada (d. 2007)

== December 8, 1916 (Friday) ==
- The Cavalry Division of India was established for service in the Mesopotamian campaign.
- Born: T. K. Whitaker, Irish economist, established the Economic and Social Research Institute of Ireland; as Thomas Kenneth Whitaker, in Rostrevor, Ireland (d. 2017)
- Died:
  - John Porter Merrell, 70, American naval officer, leading naval commander in the Spanish–American War, 11th President of the Naval War College (b. 1846)
  - Germán Riesco, 62, Chilean state leader, 14th President of Chile (b. 1854)

== December 9, 1916 (Saturday) ==
- U.S. Navy destroyer USS Shaw was launched by Mare Island Naval Shipyard in California but would serve the bulk of its time with the United States Coast Guard until it was struck in 1934.
- The Yiddish drama The Dybbuk by S. Ansky premiered at the Elizeum Theater in Warsaw. A story about a Yiddish woman being possessed by a malicious spirit, the first production was done in Russian. Ansky would later translate the play to Yiddish, where it was performed in that language by Vilna Troupe in 1920 shortly after his death.
- Born:
  - Kirk Douglas, American actor, best known for his performance as Vincent van Gogh in Lust for Life and the slave rebel leader in Spartacus, father to Michael Douglas; as Issur Danielovitch, in Amsterdam, New York, United States (d. 2020)
  - Thomas J. Lynch, American air force officer, commander of the 39th Fighter Squadron during World War II, recipient of the Silver Star and Distinguished Service Cross; in Hazleton, Pennsylvania, United States (killed in action, 1944)
  - James Brian Tait, British air force officer, commander of the 617 Squadron during World War II, recipient of the Distinguished Service Order; in Manchester, England (d. 2007)
- Died:
  - Natsume Sōseki, 49, Japanese poet and novelist, best known for his novels Kokoro, Botchan, and the unfinished work Light and Darkness (b. 1867)
  - Clara Ward, 43, American socialite, became Princesse de Caraman-Chimay when she married Prince Joseph of Belgium (b. 1873)

== December 10, 1916 (Sunday) ==
- The Autonomous Province of Korçë was established through a protocol signed between France and a commission of 14 Albanian nationalist leaders.
- World War I prevented the Nobel Prize Committee from awarding prizes to the science community. Swedish poet Verner von Heidenstam was chosen to receive the Nobel Prize in Literature.
- German raiding ship SMS Möwe captured and scuttled British cargo ship Georgic off the coast of Newfoundland. One crew member was killed in the attack and the other 141 were taken prisoner.
- The De La Salle College Ashfield was established in Ashfield, New South Wales, Australia.
- Born: John Lloyd Waddy, Australian air force officer and politician, commander of the 80 Squadron during World War II, member of Parliament of New South Wales from 1962 to 1976; in Sydney, Australia (d. 1987)
- Died: Ōyama Iwao, 74, Japanese army officer, one of the founders of the Imperial Japanese Army (b. 1842)

== December 11, 1916 (Monday) ==
- Monastir offensive – French General Joseph Joffre called off the Allied offensive in Macedonia after failure to break the military deadlock against Bulgaria and to save Romania from defeat. Estimates for Allied casualties, from both combat and disease, may have been as high as 130,000.
- Capture of Yanbu – Royal Navy ships with the Red Sea patrol bombarded Ottoman positions around the port of Yanbu.
- Italian battleship Regina Margherita struck a mine and sank in the Adriatic Sea, killing 675 of the 945 crew on board.
- British Prime Minister David Lloyd George established a war cabinet, with Maurice Hankey as Cabinet Secretary. The war cabinet eventually developed into the British government's present-day Cabinet Office.
- The Medal for the War Wounded was established for French soldiers wounded in combat, based on a suggestion by French writer Maurice Barrès.
- Born:
  - Pérez Prado, Cuban musician, credited for popularizing the mambo style of music; as Dámaso Pérez Prado, in Matanzas, Cuba (d. 1989)
  - William McGrath, Irish political leader, founder of Tara in Northern Ireland, expelled from leadership due to charges of abuse at the Kincora Boys' Home in Belfast; in Bleary, Ireland (present-day Northern Ireland, United Kingdom) (d. 1992)

== December 12, 1916 (Tuesday) ==
- Capture of Yanbu – Constant naval bombardments forced Ottoman commander Fakhri Pasha to give up on taking Yanbu and began to direct his forces further south to recapture of the port of Rabegh.
- Albert Thomas became the first Minister of Armaments for the French government.
- Died:
  - Albert Lacombe, 89, Canadian missionary, leading Catholic evangelical of Cree and Blackfoot peoples in northwest Canada, founder of the city of St. Albert, Alberta (b. 1827)
  - J. Comyns Carr, 67, English art critic, director of the Grosvenor Gallery and founder of New Gallery in London (b. 1849)

== December 13, 1916 (Wednesday) ==
- An estimated 10,000 to 18,000 Austrian and Italian soldiers were killed by avalanches in the Dolomites, including 321 on "White Friday". According to some reports, both sides deliberately fired shells into the weakened snowpacks in an attempt to bury the other side.

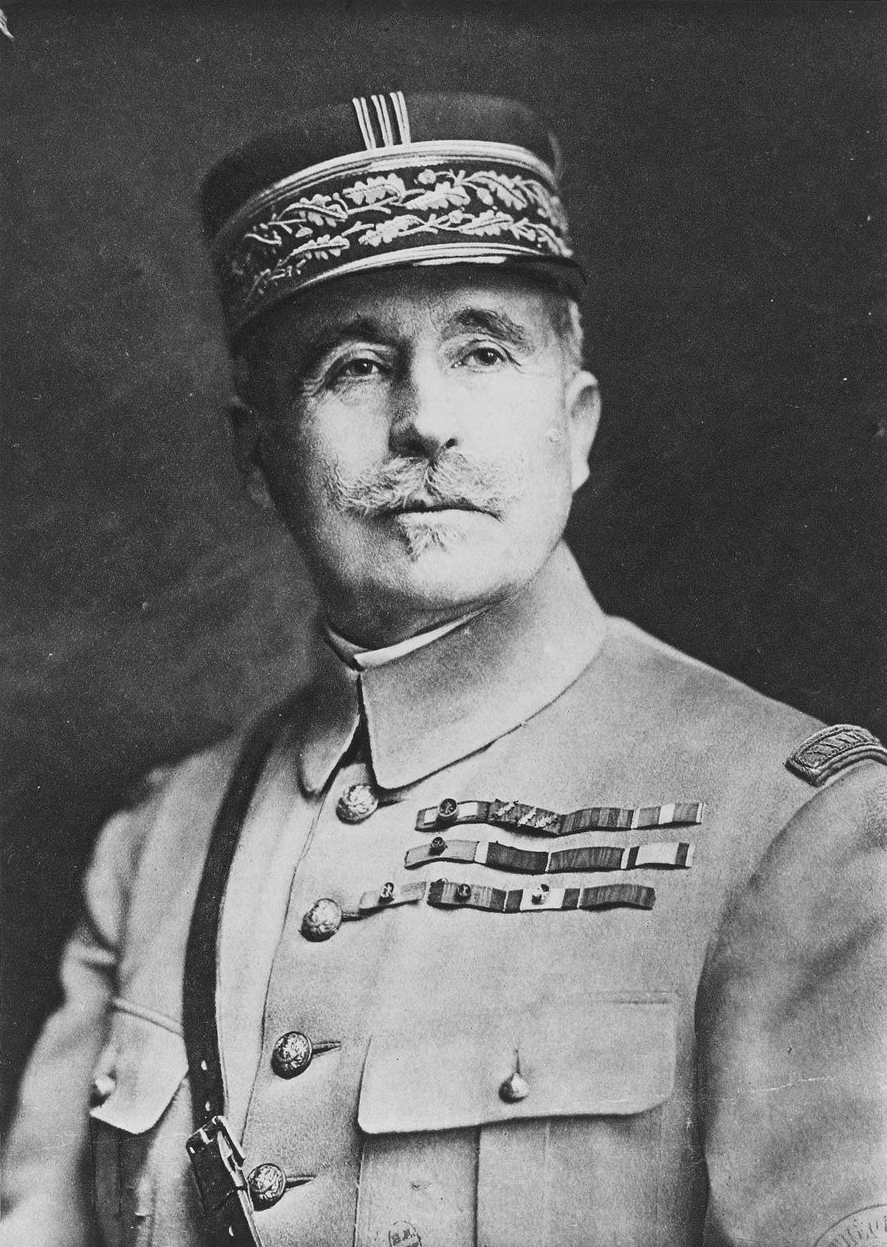
French General Robert Nivelle

- Robert Nivelle replaced Joseph Joffre as Commander-in-Chief of the French Army.
- Mesopotamian campaign – A British force of 50,000 men under command of Lieutenant General Stanley Maude was mobilized to recapture Kut from the Ottoman Empire in what is now modern-day Iraq.
- Royal Navy destroyer Landrail sank German submarine SM UB-29 using depth charges, killing all 22 of its crew.
- The Whiteheaded Boy, a play by Lennox Robinson, premiered at the Abbey Theatre in Dublin.
- The Karl Troop Cross was created by Emperor Charles to be awarded for distinguished service to all soldiers in the Austrian-Hungarian Army.
- The Werner von Siemens Ring was established as one of the highest German awards in the technical sciences, on the centennial of the birth of German inventor and industrialist Werner von Siemens.
- Deschutes County, Oregon was established with its county seat in Bend, Oregon.
- Born:
  - Hank Majeski, American baseball player, played third base for the Boston Braves, New York Yankees, Philadelphia Athletics, Chicago White Sox, Cleveland Indians and Baltimore Orioles from 1939 to 1955; as Henry Majeski, in Staten Island, United States (d. 1991)
  - Archie Moore, American boxer, longest reigning World Light Heavyweight champion from 1952 to 1962; as Archibald Lee Wright, in Benoit, Mississippi, United States (d. 1998)
- Died: Antonin Mercié, 71, French sculptor and painter, known for major public works including Gloria Victis (b. 1845)

== December 14, 1916 (Thursday) ==
- British cargo ship Russian was torpedoed and sunk in the Mediterranean Sea by German submarine SM UB-43 with the loss of 28 crew.
- The German air squadrons Jagdstaffel 26, 28, 30, 31, 32, 33 and 35 were established in the Luftstreitkräfte (German Air Force).
- Norwegian businessman Peter Brandal established the Kings Bay Company to mine coal on the Arctic island of Spitsbergen in the Svalbard archipelago north of Norway. Mining operations led to the establishment of the company town of Ny-Ålesund the following year.
- Born:
  - Shirley Jackson, American writer, author of The Haunting of Hill House and the short story The Lottery; in San Francisco, United States (d. 1965)
  - Harold Stewart, Australian poet, known for his poetry collections including Phoenix Wings: Poems 1940-46 and Orpheus and Other Poems, co-collaborator in the Ern Malley hoax; in Drummoyne, New South Wales, Australia (d. 1995)

== December 15, 1916 (Friday) ==
- Battle of Verdun – A French force of four divisions launched a second offensive against a German defense composed of five divisions, following a six-day bombardment, where some 1,169,000 shells, were fired from 827 guns. An intense creeping barrage collapsed the German defense, resulting in a loss of 13,500 men of the 21,000 in.
- American cargo ship Powhatan collided with British cargo ship Telena and sank in Chesapeake Bay off the coast of the United States. She was later salvaged and rebuilt as Cuba.
- McLeod's Light Railways began operating a rail line between the cities of Bankura and Rainagar in West Bengal, India.
- Canadian air manufacturer Canadian Aeroplanes was established in Toronto to manufacture airplanes for Royal Flying Corps Canada.
- Born:
  - Maurice Wilkins, New Zealand-British physicist, recipient of the Nobel Prize in Physiology or Medicine, discovered with Francis Crick and James Watson the double helix structure in DNA using X-ray diffraction; in Pongaroa, New Zealand (d. 2004)
  - Prince Karl Franz of Prussia, German noble, son of Prince Joachim and Princess Marie-Auguste, grandson to Kaiser Wilhelm II; in Potsdam, German Empire (present-day Germany) (d. 1975)
  - Brian Eaton, Australian air force officer, multi-decorated air squadron commander during World War II including the Silver Star, Distinguished Service Order and Distinguished Flying Cross; in Launceston, Tasmania, Australia (d. 1992)
  - Khadr El-Touni, Egyptian weightlifter, gold medalist in the 1936 Summer Olympics; in Cairo, Egypt (d. 1956)
- Died:
  - José Maria de Alpoim, 58, Portuguese politician, cabinet minister for the First Portuguese Republic (b. 1858)
  - Wilhelm Ralph Merton, 68, German industrialist, founder of the mining company Metallgesellschaft and driving force to establish Goethe University Frankfurt (b. 1848)

== December 16, 1916 (Saturday) ==
- Battle of Verdun – French forces recaptured the French towns of Vacherauville and Louvemont which had been lost to the German offensive in February, along with Louvemont-Côte-du-Poivre.
- Bulgaria ordered the mass arrest and internment of Serbian males that had served in the army as well as all government workers, educators, clergy and journalists in the occupied Serbian territories. This set off a chain of events that led to the Surdulica massacre the following year.
- Icelandic political parties Farmers' Party and Independent Farmers merged to form the Progressive Party of Iceland.
- The German air squadron Jagdstaffel 48 was established in the Luftstreitkräfte.
- Boy Scouts founder Robert Baden-Powell gave the first public display of the new Wolf Cub section of Scouting at Caxton Hall, Westminster.
- The Connaught Tunnel near Revelstoke, British Columbia opened, becoming at the time the longest railway mountain tunnel in the world.
- Funakawa Light Railway extended the Oga Line in the Akita Prefecture, Japan, with station Oga serving the line.
- Born: Ruth Johnson Colvin, American philanthropist and activist, founder of ProLiteracy Worldwide; as Ruth Johnson, in Chicago, United States (d. 2024)
- Died:
  - William N. Barrett, 61, American politician, member of the Oregon Legislative Assembly from 1880 to 1908, Oregon State Senate from 1909 to 1913, and 8th Mayor of Hillsboro, Oregon (b. 1855)
  - Hugo Münsterberg, 53, German-American psychologist, leading researcher in industrial psychology, author of Psychology and Industrial Efficiency (b. 1863)

== December 17, 1916 (Sunday) ==
- Battle of Verdun – The French consolidated a new line from Louvemont-Côte-du-Poivre to Bezonvaux in France, pushing the Germans 7.5 kilometers away from Verdun and taking 11,387 prisoners and 115 guns.
- The Royal Guernsey Light Infantry was established for action on the Western Front, as part of 202nd Brigade and 67th Division.
- Born:
  - Penelope Fitzgerald, English novelist, author of many acclaimed historical novels including The Blue Flower; as Penelope Mary Knox, in Lincoln, England (d. 2000)
  - Martin A. Pomerantz, American physicist, leading researcher and promoter of Antarctic astronomy; in New York City, United States (d. 2008)
  - Hugh Norman-Walker, British civil servant, Colonial Secretary of Hong Kong from 1969 to 1973; in London, England (d. 1985)
- Died: Hyacinthe-Marie Cormier, 84, French clergy, 76th Master of the Order of Preachers, beatified by Pope John Paul II in 1994 (b. 1832)

== December 18, 1916 (Monday) ==
- Battle of Verdun – The battle officially ended in German defeat. Estimates of casualties varied, with most recent estimates placing the average at 377,000 French casualties and 337,000 German casualties.
- The Philadelphia Grand Opera Company debuted with a performance of the Gaetano Donizetti opera Lucia di Lammermoor before disbanding shortly after and reforming in 1920.
- Born:
  - Betty Grable, American actress, set a record 12 consecutive years in top box office hits including Mother Wore Tights and How to Marry a Millionaire; as Elizabeth Ruth Grable, in St. Louis, United States (d. 1973)
  - Douglas Fraser, Scottish-American union leader, president of the United Auto Workers from 1977 to 1983; in Glasgow, Scotland (d. 2008)
  - Rostislav Alexeyev, Russian engineer, designer of the first ground-effect vehicle; in Novozybkov, Russian Empire (present-day Russia) (d. 1980)
  - Franciszek Kornicki, Polish fighter pilot, served with both the Polish and Royal Air Force during World War II, recipient of the Cross of Valour; in Wereszyn, Russian Empire (present-day Poland) (d. 2017)
  - William Watson, American athlete, first African American to win the Amateur Athletic Union decathlon championship in 1940; in Boley, Oklahoma, United States (d. 1973)
- Died: Giulia Valle, 69, Italian nun, member of the Sisters of Charity of Saint Joan Antida Thoure and known educator in Turin, beatified by Pope John Paul II in 2004 (b. 1847)

== December 19, 1916 (Tuesday) ==
- The Imperial Camel Corps was established under command of Brigadier General Clement Leslie Smith as a special desert fighting unit in the Senussi campaign.
- Born: Ted Gaskell, English association football player, goalkeeper for Brentford from 1937 to 1952; as Edward Gaskell, in Bredbury, England (d. 2009)
- Died:
  - Guido Henckel von Donnersmarck, 86, German noble and industrialist, inheritor and owner of several mining and steelworks operations around Silesia, considered one of the wealthiest Europeans of his generation (b. 1830)
  - Doug Allison, 70, American baseball player, catcher for the Cincinnati Red Stockings, first ball player to use a glove, brother to Art Allison (b. 1846)
  - Thibaw Min, 57, Burmese monarch, last king of the Konbaung dynasty (b. 1859)

== December 20, 1916 (Wednesday) ==
- Ross Sea party – The British polar exploration ship Aurora departed for Cape Evans in the Antarctic to rescue the final expedition members of the second arm Imperial Trans-Antarctic Expedition, with expedition leader Ernest Shackleton on board as a supernumerary officer.
- The 3rd Marine Littoral Regiment was reactivated using assets from the 1st Marine Regiment in the Dominican Republic.
- German flying ace Manfred von Richthofen (nicknamed the Red Baron) shot down and killed British flying ace Arthur Gerald Knight in an act of vengeance for Knight causing the mid-air collision that killed German ace Oswald Boelcke on October 28.
- Born: Michel Chartrand, Canadian labor activist, president of Confédération des syndicats nationaux from 1968 to 1978; in Outremont, Quebec, Canada (d. 2010)
- Died:
  - Harry Marks, 61, British journalist, founder of Financial News (b. 1855)
  - Arthur Morgan, 60, Australian politician, Premier of Queensland, Australia from 1903 to 1906 (b. 1856)

== December 21, 1916 (Thursday) ==
- The British Desert Column occupied El Arish during its advance across the Sinai Peninsula.
- The British House of Commons announced all Irish prisoners involved in the Easter Rising were to be released.
- Royal Navy destroyer HMS Hoste collided with fellow fleet destroyer HMS Negro in the North Sea during heavy weather. Both vessels sank, with the loss of all 80 crew on the Negro, while another destroyer was able to rescue most of the crew from the Hoste.

== December 22, 1916 (Friday) ==
- The Government of Denmark ratified the Treaty of the Danish West Indies, following a referendum on December 14, which would allow the United States to purchase the Danish West Indies for $25 million.
- The Desert Column was established under command of Field Marshal Philip Chetwode as part of the Egyptian Expeditionary Force.
- Royal Navy submarine HMS E30 struck a mine and sank in the North Sea with all 30 crew lost.
- British pilot Harry Hawker flew the first prototype of the Sopwith Camel, which was designed to counter the German Fokker aircraft.
- Born: Fernando Corena, Swiss opera singer, best known for success with the Metropolitan Opera between 1954 and 1978; in Geneva, Switzerland (d. 1984)
- Died: John Benjamin Murphy, 58, American surgeon, pioneer of the appendectomy and other abdominal surgeries (b. 1857)

== December 23, 1916 (Saturday) ==
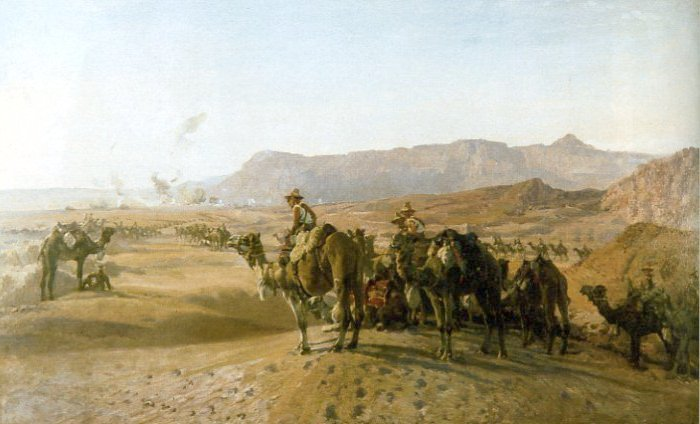
Camel corps at the Battle of Magdhaba

- The Desert Column, composed of Australian and New Zealand mounted troops, captured the Ottoman garrison during the Battle of Magdhaba.
- Born: Noel Dyson, English actress, best known for her role as Ida Barlow in the long-running BBC soap opera Coronation Street and the sitcom Father, Dear Father; as Elsie Noël Dyson, in Manchester, England (d. 1995)
- Died:
  - Henry Farny, 69, French-American painter, best known for depictions of Indigenous peoples in the American West, member of the Cincinnati Art Club (b. 1847)
  - James Little, 79, Irish physician, chief physician of Adelaide Hospital in Dublin (b. 1837)

== December 24, 1916 (Sunday) ==
- A partial solar eclipse occurred over the south Indian Ocean.
- Born:
  - P. Shilu Ao, Indian politician, member of the Naga people who was chief negotiator for the state of Nagaland in northeast India in 1963; in Mokokchung district, British India (present-day India) (d. 1988)
  - Cecília Schelingová, Slovak nun, aided priests fleeing Czechoslovakia during a communist crackdown before being imprisoned, beatified by Pope John Paul II in 2003; in Krivá, Austria-Hungary (present-day Slovakia) (d. 1955)

== December 25, 1916 (Monday) ==
- The last group of Irish prisoners involved in the Easter Rising — 460 men from Reading Gaol — were released in Dublin, including Irish nationalists Seán T. O'Kelly and Arthur Griffith.
- The Keihin Railway extended the Keikyū Main Line in the Kanagawa Prefecture, Japan, with station Hatchōnawate serving the line.
- The Mexican polka "Jesusita en Chihuahua" by Quirino Mendoza y Cortés was first performed by a military marching band during Christmas festivities in Puebla, Mexico.
- Born: Ahmed Ben Bella, Algerian state leader, first President of Algeria; in Maghnia, French Algeria (present-day Algeria) (d. 2012)
- Died: Albert Chmielowski, 71, Polish clergy, founder of the Albertine Brothers order (b. 1845)

== December 26, 1916 (Tuesday) ==
- Imperial German Navy airships made the first bombing mission against the Russian Empire, targeting Petrograd which was the royal seat of the empire. Bad weather prevented the airships from reaching their targets and one was forced to land in German-occupied Russia, where strong winds eventually destroyed her three days later.
- Born: Noel Agazarian, British fighter pilot, earned flying ace commendation for seven victories during the Battle of Britain, brother to Jack Agazarian; in London, England (killed during a mission in Libya, 1941)
- Died: Janis Rozentāls, 50, Latvian painter, known for such works as "Women and the Spirits of Nature" and "Daughters of the Sun" (b. 1866)

== December 27, 1916 (Wednesday) ==
- Togoland was divided into British and French administrative zones.
- French battleship Gaulois was torpedoed and sunk in the Aegean Sea by German submarine SM UB-47, killing four crew members.
- Tsar Nicholas dismissed Alexander Trepov as Prime Minister of Russia and replaced him with Nikolai Golitsyn, despite the latter's protest he was unprepared to take up the position.
- British flying ace John Quested shot down and killed German ace Gustav Leffers who was flying a captured French aircraft, before being forced down by another German plane.
- Born: Cathy Lewis, American actress, best known for her radio and TV work including the radio-TV comedy My Friend Irma; as Catherine Lee Lewis, in Spokane, Washington, United States (d. 1968)

== December 28, 1916 (Thursday) ==
- A strong La Niña created heavy rain and flooding in Clermont, Queensland, Australia, claiming more than 60 lives. Melbourne and Hobart each received a record 967.5 millimetres (38.09 in) and 1,104.2 millimetres (43.47 in) of annual rainfall respectively.
- Six German Navy airships attempted a raid on England but are recalled due to bad weather. One airship was unable to return to base and landed nearby, where she was battered to pieces by wind.
- While ground crewman were walking the German Navy Zeppelin L 24 to her shed at Tondern, Germany, high winds picked up and slammed the airship against her hangar before catching fire. She and the Zeppelin L 17, which was in the hangar, were destroyed in the resulting blaze.
- The German air squadron Jagdstaffel 29 was established in the Luftstreitkräfte.
- Died:
  - Tarleton Hoffman Bean, 70, American biologist, recorded and classified indigenous fish in the northeastern United States and its eastern seaboard, as well as Alaska (b. 1846)
  - Eduard Strauss, 81, Austrian composer, member of the renowned Strauss family, son to Johann Strauss, best known for his dance compositions for the waltz, polka and march (b. 1835)

== December 29, 1916 (Friday) ==
- British cargo ship Alondra was wrecked off the coast of Ireland, with 17 crew members perishing while another 23 were rescued.
- The United States Government passed the Stock-Raising Homestead Act, which allowed 640 acres (260 ha) of public land to be used by settlers for ranching purposes.
- James Joyce's semi-autobiographical novel A Portrait of the Artist as a Young Man was first published complete in book form in New York City.
- George Noble Plunkett was dismissed from his post as curator of the National Museum of Ireland and deported to Oxford, due to his son, Joseph Plunkett, being one of the leaders of the Easter Rising.
- The 25th Avenue and Bay Parkway elevated train stations opened in New York City. Bay Parkway was listed in the National Register of Historic Places in 2005.
- Born: Frederick Lippitt, American army officer and politician, member of the Rhode Island House of Representatives from 1961 to 1983, grandson of Rhode Island Governor Henry Lippitt; in Providence, Rhode Island, United States (d. 2005)

== December 30, 1916 (Saturday) ==
- Humberto Gómez and his mercenaries seized Arauca in Colombia and declared the Republic of Arauca. He proceeded to pillage the region before fleeing to Venezuela.
- Born: James Mitose, American martial artist, introduced the Japanese art of Kenpō to the United States; as Masayoshi Mitose, in Kailua-Kona, Territory of Hawaii, United States (present-day Hawaii) (d. 1981)
- Died: Grigori Rasputin, 47, Russian mystic, murdered by Russian noble Felix Yusupov and other conspirators in Petrograd (b. 1869)

== December 31, 1916 (Sunday) ==
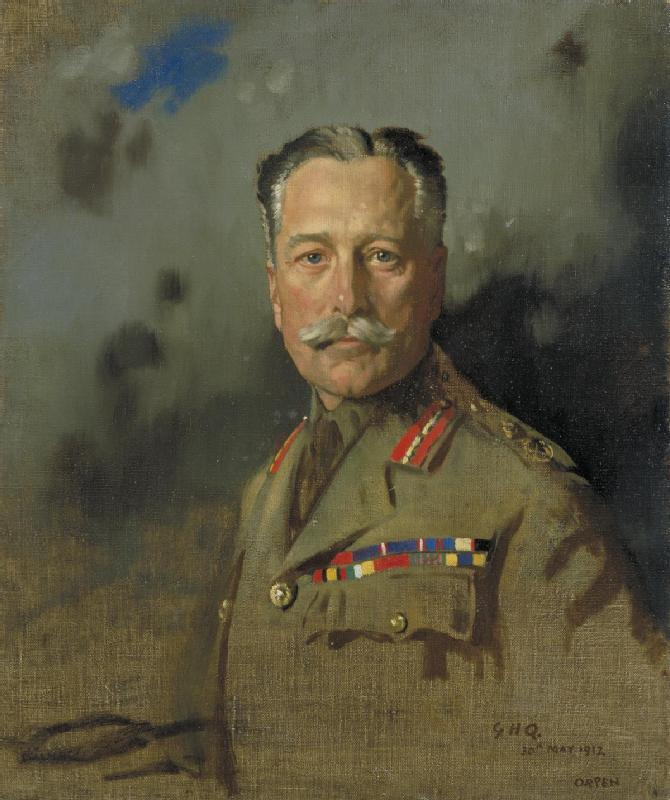
British General Douglas Haig

- Members of the Indian National Congress and the All-India Muslim League formed a political alliance known as the Lucknow Pact during joint sessions held in Lucknow, India to promote self-government and independence from British rule.
- Douglas Haig was promoted to Field Marshal of the British Army.
- By the end of 1916, 17,341 commissioned officers and men were deployed in Great Britain for home air defense, including 12,000 to man antiaircraft guns and 2,200 assigned to 12 Royal Flying Corps squadrons composed of 110 aeroplanes.
- The Royal Flying Corps established the No. 206 and No. 207 Squadrons.
- The Imperial German Army established the 2nd Bavarian Landwehr Division and was active until disbanding in 1919.
- Born:
  - Leo Kahn, American business executive, co-founder of office retailer Staples and founder of the Fresh Fields and Nature's Heartland chain (now part of Whole Foods Market); in Medford, Massachusetts, United States (d. 2011)
  - Ítalo Argentino Lúder, Argentine politician, served at acting President of Argentina in 1975 and President of the Argentine Senate from 1974 to 1976; in Rafaela, Argentina (d. 2008)
- Died: Alice Ball, 24, American chemist, first African-American woman to practice chemistry, developed an effective drug treatment for leprosy; died from chemical poisoning during her research (b. 1892)
