= January 1917 =

Month in 1917

<<	January 1917					>>
Su	Mo	Tu	We	Th	Fr	Sa
	1	2	3	4	5	6
7	8	9	10	11	12	13
14	15	16	17	18	19	20
21	22	23	24	25	26	27
28	29	30	31

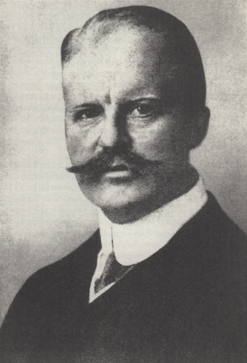
German foreign minister Arthur Zimmermann, authorized the Zimmermann Telegram promising Germany's alliance to Mexico against the United States.

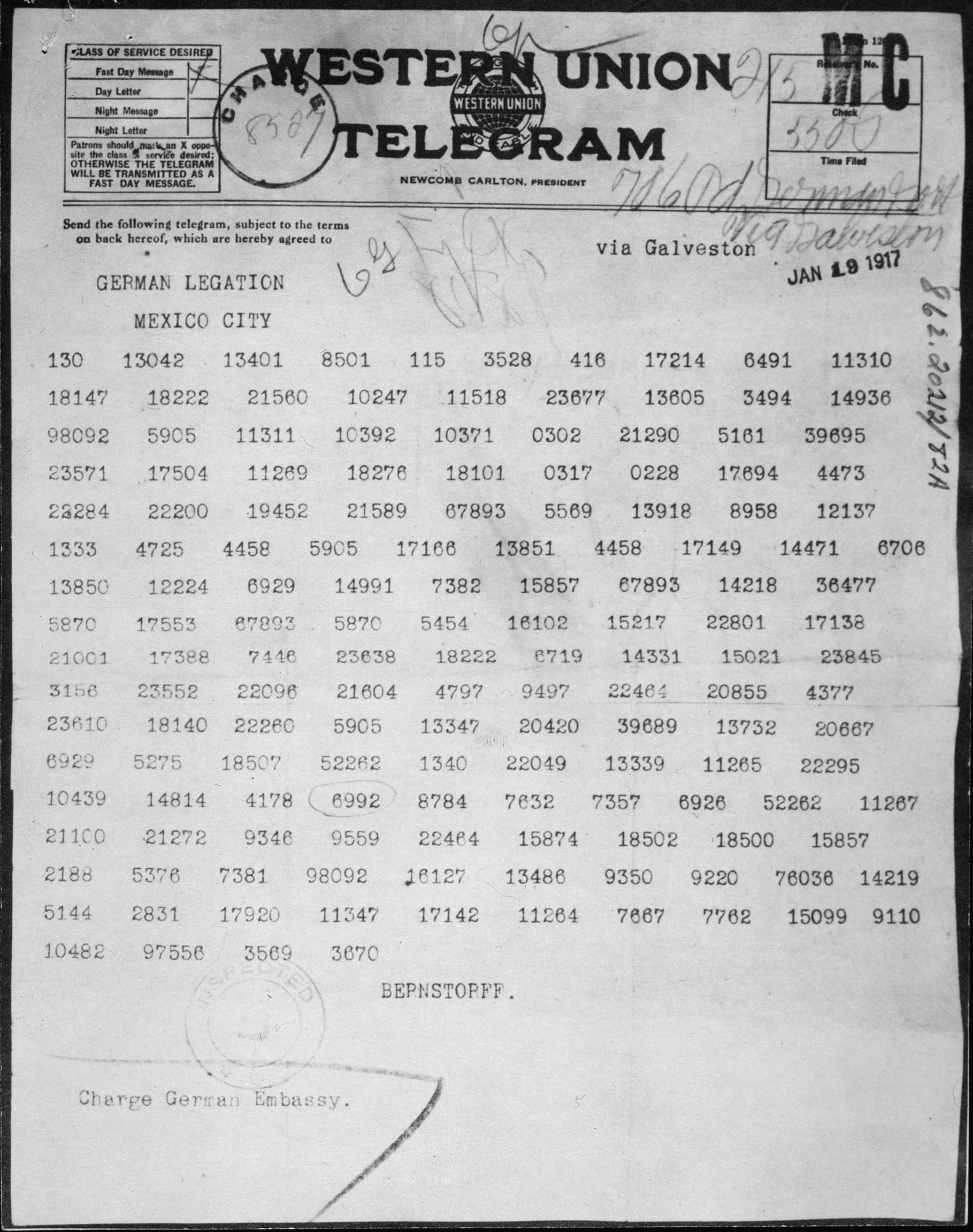
The intercepted Zimmermann Telegram

The following events occurred in January 1917:

== January 1, 1917 (Monday) ==
- British troopship Ivernia was torpedoed and sunk in the Mediterranean Sea by German submarine SM UB-47, with the loss of 125 lives.
- University of Oregon defeated University of Pennsylvania 14–0 in the third annual U.S. college football Rose Bowl Game, in front of a crowd of 27,000 at Tournament Park in Pasadena, California.
- The Luftstreitkräfte (German Air Force) disbanded three Kampfgeschwader (bomber wings) and redesignated their squadrons as Schutzstaffeln (escort squadrons). Operating two-seat Albatros, Rumpler, Gotha Taube, and Fokker aircraft, the new "Schusta" squadrons are tasked with escorting two-seat observation planes of the Feldflieger Abteilungen (field flying detachments) and Artillerieflieger Abteilungen (artillery flying detachments) during their reconnaissance flights, and are based with them.
- The 5th Guards Infantry Division for the Imperial German Army was established to support the Western Front. It was dissolved in 1919.
- The Great Falls Dam for Caney Fork River in central Tennessee began operations.
- The Leipzig Transport Authority was established through a merger of two other transit companies in Leipzig.
- The Thomas Brothers Aeroplane Company merged with the Morse Chain Works to form Thomas-Morse Aircraft in Ithaca, New York.
- The Istanbul University State Conservatory was established as the Darülelhan (House of Melodies), a four-year academy that focused mainly on Turkish music.
- The Chesapeake and Potomac Telephone Company of West Virginia was formed as part of the Bell System for service in West Virginia. It is now known as Frontier West Virginia.
- The Iron and Steel Trades Confederation was established through the merger of three British industrial trade unions.
- The Ise Electric Railway extended the Nagoya Line in the Mie Prefecture, Japan, with stations Chisato and Edobashi serving the line.
- The comic opera Eileen, written by Victor Herbert and Henry Blossom, premiered at the Colonial Theatre in Cleveland as Hearts of Erin before moving to Boston and changing to its current title.
- The Argentine football club Los Andes was established in Lomas de Zamora, Argentina.
- Born:
  - Shannon Bolin, American actress and singer, best known for her stage work in Damn Yankees, The Golden Apple, Take Me Along, The Little Foxes and Desire Under the Elms; in Spencer, South Dakota, United States (d. 2016)
  - Ruzi Nazar, Uzbek spy, leading CIA agent in Turkey and Germany during the 1950s and 1960s; in Margilan, Russian Provisional Government (present-day Uzbekistan) (d. 2015)

== January 2, 1917 (Tuesday) ==
- The Royal Bank of Canada took over Quebec Bank.
- The Maduro Bank was established in the Curaçao and Dependencies Dutch Caribbean colony, and later merged to become Maduro & Curiel's Bank in 1932.
- Southeastern High School opened its doors to secondary students in Detroit.
- Born:
  - Vera Zorina, German ballet dancer and actress, best known for her performance work with Gaiety Theatre, London and Original Ballet Russe; as Eva Brigitta Hartwig, in Berlin, German Empire (present-day Germany) (d. 2003)
  - Zainab al Ghazali, Egyptian activist, founder of the Muslim Women's Association; in Egypt (d. 2005)
- Died:
  - Léon Flameng, 39, French cyclist, three-time medalist (including gold) at the 1896 Summer Olympics; killed in action (b. 1877)
  - Edward Burnett Tylor, 84, English anthropologist, founder of cultural anthropology (b. 1832)

== January 3, 1917 (Wednesday) ==
- Dmitry Shuvayev was replaced by Mikhail Belyaev as Minister of War in the Russian Government.
- Two trains collided at Ratho Station in Scotland, killing 12 people and injuring 46 others. An inquiry found inadequate signaling procedures led to the crash.
- Born:
  - Roger Williams Straus Jr., American publisher, co-founder of publishing company Farrar, Straus and Giroux; in New York City, United States (d. 2004)
  - Jesse White, American actor, best known as the Maytag repairman in television commercials from 1967 to 1988; as Jesse Marc Weidenfeld, in Buffalo, New York, United States (d. 1997)
  - Vernon A. Walters, American army officer and diplomat, 19th Deputy Director of the Central Intelligence Agency, 17th United States Ambassador to the United Nations; in New York City, United States (d. 2002)

== January 4, 1917 (Thursday) ==
- Russian battleship Peresvet struck two mines and sank in the Mediterranean Sea off the coast of Egypt, with the loss of 167 of her 771 crew.
- An earthquake measuring 6.5 in magnitude struck Pingtung County, Taiwan, killing 54 people, injuring another 85, and destroying 130 homes.
- Battle of Behobeho – A colonial British unit led by Captain Frederick Selous encountered and fought a German column on the Rufiji River in German East Africa (now Tanzania). In the ensuing firefight, Selous was killed by a German sniper.
- Chilean news publisher Eliodoro Yáñez founded Empresa Periodística as a news company which included the daily newspaper La Nación. It was expropriated by the state during the dictatorship of Carlos Ibáñez del Campo and remained part of the Chilean government since then.
- The Patent and Trademark Office Society was established to address ongoing standards and processes of the U.S. patent system.
- Died: Carl Ludwig Jessen, 83, German painter, known for works including The Blue Living Room and A Knitting Italian Woman (b. 1833)

== January 5, 1917 (Friday) ==
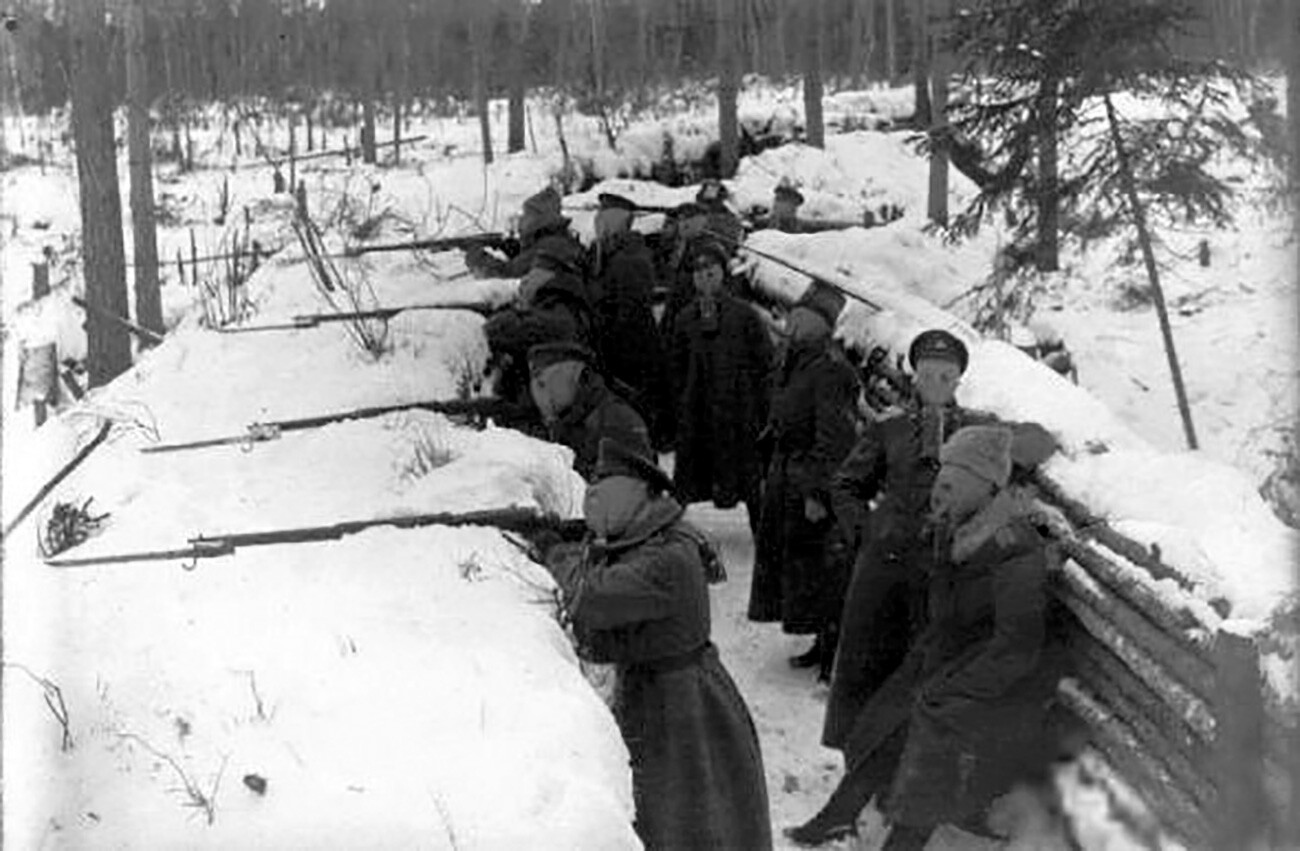
Latvian riflemen in the trenches during the Christmas Battles.

- Christmas Battles – Russian forces launched a surprise attack against German defenses near Riga, Latvia, on what was supposed to be Christmas in the Julian calendar.
- British cargo ship Lesbian was sunk in the Mediterranean Sea by German submarine SM U-35. All crew survived, but the captain was taken as a prisoner of war.
- The first prototype of the Sage aircraft took flight.
- Born:
  - Adolfo Consolini, Italian discus thrower, gold medalist in the 1948 Summer Olympics and silver medalist in the 1952 Summer Olympics; in Costermano sul Garda, Kingdom of Italy (present-day Italy) (d. 1969, viral hepatitis)
  - Lucienne Day, British textile designer, best known for her award-winning contemporary designs, such as Calyx for fashion and interior, recipient of the Order of the British Empire; as Désirée Lucienne Lisbeth Dulcie Conradi, in Surrey, England (d. 2010)
  - Jane Wyman, American actress, best known for her role as Angela Channing in the television soap opera Falcon Crest, recipient of the Academy Award for Best Actress for Johnny Belinda, first wife of Ronald Reagan; as Sarah Jane Mayfield, in St. Joseph, Missouri, United States (d. 2007)

== January 6, 1917 (Saturday) ==
- In a controversial election for leadership of the Jehovah's Witnesses (officially, the Watch Tower Bible and Tract Society) following the October 31 death of founder and president Charles Taze Russell, the Society's legal counsel, Judge Joseph Franklin Rutherford was elected unopposed as the second president of the Christian denomination. In the weeks that followed, objections to Rutherford were raised by four of the seven directors of the Society, who accused him of mismanagement.
- Born:
  - Koo Chen-fu, Taiwanese business leader, head of the Koos Group; in Taihoku Chō, Japanese Taiwan (present-day Taiwan) (d. 2005)
  - Maeve Brennan, Irish writer, known for her The Long-Winded Lady articles in The New Yorker and her novella The Visitor; in Dublin, Ireland (d. 1993)
  - Sydney Banks, Canadian broadcaster, founder and director of CUC Broadcasting; in Toronto, Canada (d. 2006)
- Died:
  - Frederick William Borden, 69, Canadian politician, 15th Minister of Militia and Defence, in Cornwallis, Nova Scotia (b. 1847)
  - Hendrick Peter Godfried Quack, 82, Dutch economist and historian, author of De socialisten: Personen en stelsels ("The socialists: persons and systems") (b. 1834)

== January 7, 1917 (Sunday) ==
- Mikhail Rodzianko, Chairman of the State Duma (Russian Parliament), warned Tsar Nicholas that the constant changes in the Russian cabinet was weakening the government: "All the best men have been removed or have retired. There remain those of ill repute."
- The Royal Flying Corps established air squadrons No. 81, No. 82, No. 83, and No. 84.
- Born:
  - Alfred Freedman, American psychiatrist, advocate to the American Psychiatric Association in removing homosexuality from its official list of mental disorders; in Albany, New York, United States (d. 2011)
  - Milton Resnick, Russian-American painter, member of the abstract expressionist movement; in Bratslav, Russian Empire (present-day Ukraine) (d. 2004)

== January 8, 1917 (Monday) ==
- Kaiser Wilhelm made a decision that would ultimately bring the United States into World War I, directing that the Imperial German Navy begin unrestricted submarine warfare on all ships traveling to or from the British Isles. Admiral Georg Alexander von Müller would recount later, "At 7 o'clock in the evening report to the Kaiser, who had suddenly and rather unexpectedly convinced himself of the need for ruthless U-boat warfare and declared himself very strongly in its favour, even if the Chancellor were to oppose it. He took the most remarkable view that U-boat warfare was a purely military matter." As the Kaiser signed the orders, Müller recalled, "he remarked that he reckoned almost certainly with America's declaration of war."
- Born: Sylvia Agnes Sophia Tait, British chemist, known for her collaborations with husband James Francis Tait on the discovery of the hormone aldosterone; as Sylvia Wardropper, in Tyumen, Russia (d. 2003)
- Died:
  - George Warrender, 56, British naval officer, commander of the 2nd Battle Squadron during World War I (b. 1860)
  - Mary Arthur McElroy, 75, American socialite, sister to U.S. President Chester A. Arthur and acting First Lady of the United States (b. 1841)
  - Maximilian von Schwartzkoppen, 66, German army officer, one of the figures involved in the Dreyfus affair (b. 1850)

== January 9, 1917 (Tuesday) ==
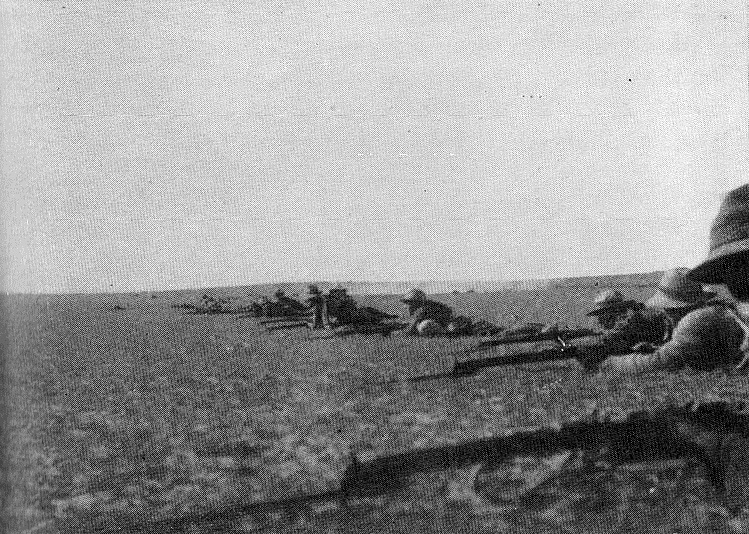
British infantry at the Battle of Rafa.

- Battle of Rafa – The Desert Column of the Egyptian Expeditionary Force captured the last substantial Ottoman Army garrison on the Sinai Peninsula. Ottoman casualties included 1,434 prisoners, 200 killed and 168 wounded. British casualties were 71 killed and 415 wounded.
- Royal Navy battleship HMS Cornwallis was torpedoed and sunk in the Mediterranean Sea by German submarine SM U-32, with the loss of 15 of her 720 crew.
- Pete Herman defeated Kid Williams over 20 rounds at New Orleans to take the World Bantamweight Championship, which he held until 1920.
- Born:
  - Abdullah al-Sallal, Yemeni state leader, first President of the Yemen Arab Republic; in Sanaa, Ottoman Empire (present-day Yemen) (d. 1994)
  - Roland J. Barnick, American air force officer, commander of the 438th Air Expeditionary Wing during World War II and the 63rd Troop Carrier Wing in the 1960s, recipient of the Silver Star, Bronze Star Medal and Order of the Sword; in Max, North Dakota, United States (d. 1996)
- Died: Luther D. Bradley, 63, American cartoonist, known for his editorial cartoons for the Chicago Daily News (d. 1853)

== January 10, 1917 (Wednesday) ==
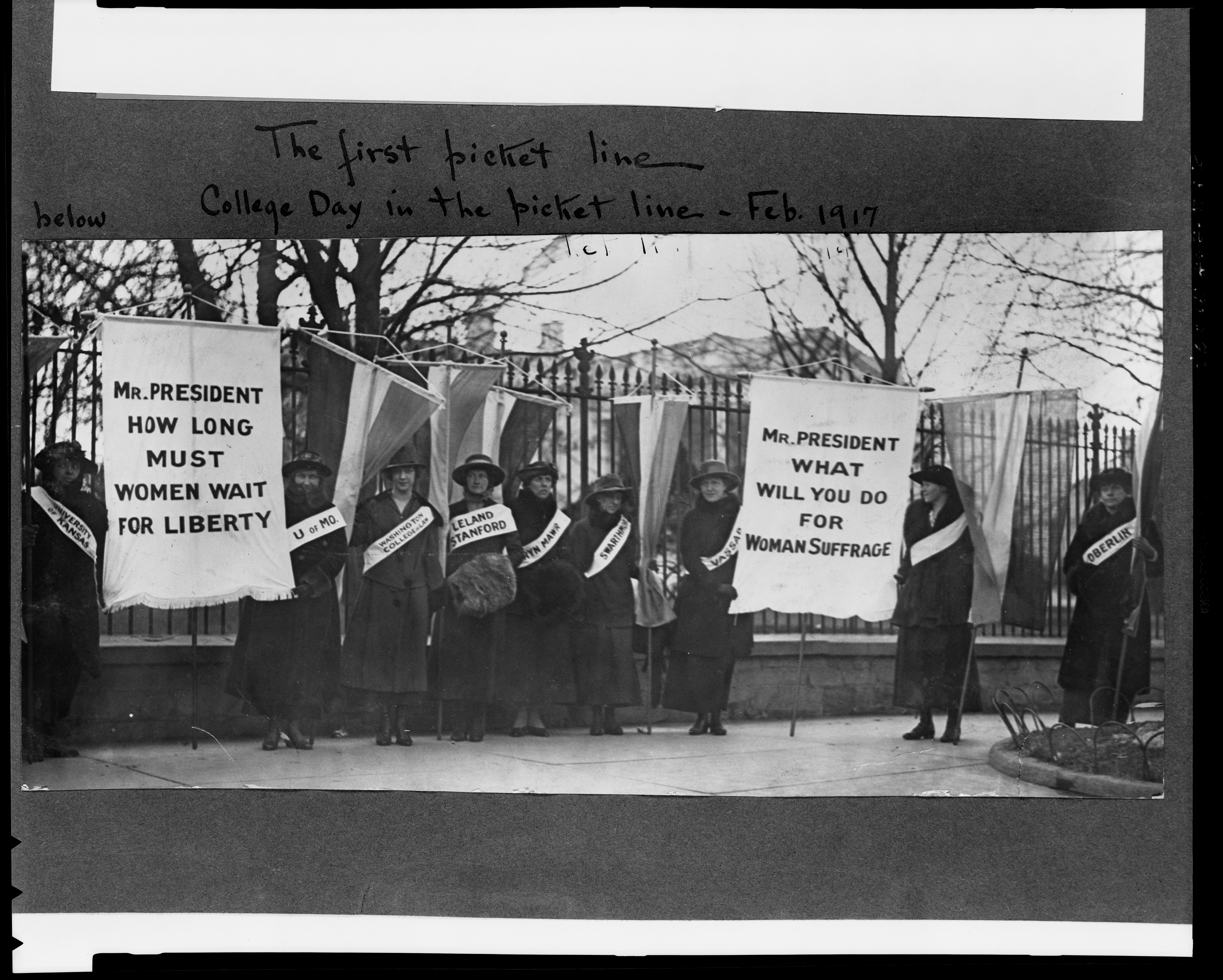
Silent Sentinels picketing the White House

- The opening of the Duma (Russian Parliament) was postponed to February 25, furthering upping tensions between the monarchy and the Russian government.
- Ross Sea party – The last seven marooned members of the second arm of the Imperial Trans-Antarctic Expedition were rescued at Cape Evans, Antarctica by polar ship SY Aurora, with expedition leader Ernest Shackleton in command. They learned of the overall failure of expedition due to the wreck of the polar ship Endurance in 1915 as well as having to report to Shackleton the deaths of three of its expedition members.
- The suffragist group known as the Silent Sentinels, organized by Alice Paul of the National Woman's Party, began holding daily demonstrations in front of the White House in Washington, D.C.
- The Luftstreitkräfte, the air arm of the Imperial German Army, established air squadron Jagdstaffel 37.
- Born:
  - Jerry Wexler, American record producer, celebrated producer for Atlantic Records and Warner Records; as Gerald Wexler, in New York City, United States (d. 2008)
  - Saul Cherniack, Canadian politician, member of the Legislative Assembly of Manitoba from 1962 to 1981 and Manitoba Minister of Finance from 1973 to 1975; in Winnipeg, Canada (d. 2018)
- Died: Buffalo Bill, 70, American frontiersman, famous for this Buffalo Bill's Wild West circus, recipient of the Medal of Honor (b. 1846)

== January 11, 1917 (Thursday) ==
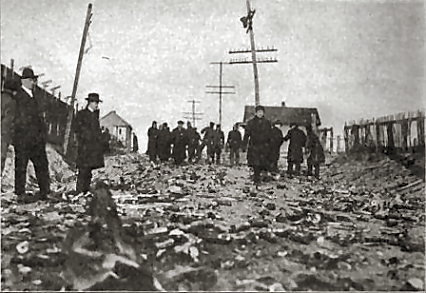
Ruins of a munitions plant at Kingsland, New Jersey, after a massive explosion destroyed the entire factory.

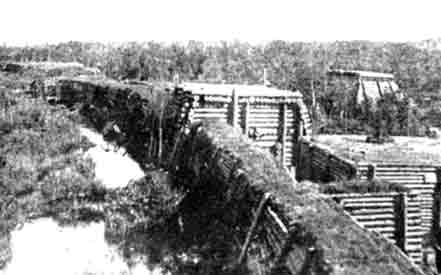
German fortifications during the Christmas Battles.

- The British began raids on German-held territory around the Ancre Valley in France.
- Christmas Battles – The German 8th Army abandoned a key defense position south of Riga, Latvia and retreated, leaving behind a seven-kilometer gap in the German line that the Imperial Russian Army failed to exploit.
- Kingsland explosion – A massive explosion destroyed a munitions plant at Kingsland (now Lyndhurst, New Jersey). Evidence of the blast suggested sabotage, with suspected links to Germany.
- Royal Navy seaplane tender HMS Ben-my-Chree was shelled and sunk by Ottoman shore artillery while in harbor at Castelorizo Island, Greece, becoming the only aviation ship of any nationality sunk by enemy action during World War I.
- The Luftstreitkräfte established air squadron Jagdstaffel 36.
- The Sacred Heart Institute opened in Yorkton, Saskatchewan by the Sisters Servants of Mary Immaculate, and was later changed to Sacred Heart High School in 1973.
- Born:
  - John Robarts, Canadian politician, 17th Premier of Ontario; in Banff, Alberta, Canada (d. 1982)
  - Abdul Wali Khan, Pakistani politician, leader of the National Awami Party during a movement to return democracy to Pakistan; in Utmanzai, Charsadda, British India (present-day Pakistan) (d. 2006)

== January 12, 1917 (Friday) ==
- German flying ace Manfred von Richthofen, better known as the "Red Baron", received the Pour le Mérite (the "Blue Max") for having shot down 16 Allied aircraft since September 1916.
- Born: Jimmy Skinner, Canadian sports executive, head coach and general manager of the Detroit Red Wings, coached the team to winning the 1955 Stanley Cup; as James Donald Skinner, in Selkirk, Manitoba, Canada (d. 2007)

== January 13, 1917 (Saturday) ==
- U.S. Navy cruiser USS Milwaukee ran aground at Eureka, California, with all 438 crew rescued. The naval vessel broke in two in November 1918 and was a total loss.
- Born: Khoo Teck Puat, Singaporean business leader, founder of the Goodwell Group which included the Goodwell hotel chain; in Singapore, Straits Settlements (present-day Singapore) (d. 2004)
- Died:
  - Albert Niemann, 85, German opera singer, most famous as the lead tenor in The Ring Cycle by Richard Wagner (b. 1831)
  - Matthew Arlington Batson, 50, American army officer, founder of the Philippine Scouts, recipient of the Medal of Honor for action during the Philippine–American War (b. 1866)

== January 14, 1917 (Sunday) ==
- A rail accident at Ciurea train station in Romania killed between an estimated 600 to 1,000 people, making it the third worst rail accident in world history.
- Japanese cruiser Tsukuba exploded and sank at Yokosuka, Japan with the loss of 305 of her 879 crew.
- The Kingdom of Poland was established as a puppet state of the German Empire, marking the third time it was restored to the country.
- Russian noble Prince Georgy Lvov proposed to Grand Duke Nicholas, Viceroyal for the Caucasus, that he should take control of the Russian government from Tsar Nicholas.
- Royal Navy destroyer HMS Penshurst shelled and sunk German submarine SM UB-37 in the English Channel with the loss of all 21 crew.
- The 231st Brigade of the British Army was established.
- The first edition of the Chilean daily newspaper El Marino was released in Pichilemu, Chile but shut down within two months.
- A meeting between Leon Trotsky and Ludwig Lore in New York City lay the groundwork to publishing the Marxist magazine The Class Struggle which ran from 1917 to 1919.
- Died:
  - Elisha Hunt Rhodes, 74, American soldier, his diaries during the American Civil War were published as All For the Union and featured prominently in the Ken Burns PBS documentary series The Civil War (b. 1842)
  - Ben Viljoen, 47, Boer army officer, noted commander during the First and Second Boer Wars (b. 1869)

== January 15, 1917 (Monday) ==
- Jones County, South Dakota, was established with its county seat in Murdo, South Dakota.
- German football club 1st Haßfurt was established in Haßfurt, Germany.
- Died: William De Morgan, 77, English artist, best known for his collaborations with William Morris for window, furniture and ornamental designs for Morris & Co. (b. 1839)

== January 16, 1917 (Tuesday) ==
- U.S. President Woodrow Wilson formally ratified the Treaty of the Danish West Indies, allowing the United States to purchase the Danish West Indies for $25 million.
- Arthur Zimmermann, State Secretary for Foreign Affairs for the German Empire, sent a coded telegram (which would come to be known as the "Zimmermann Telegram") to Heinrich von Eckardt, German ambassador to Mexico, with instructions to propose to Mexico that the country and Germany "make war together, make peace together, generous financial support and an understanding on our part that Mexico is to reconquer the lost territory in Texas, New Mexico, and Arizona."
- The 242nd Infantry Division was established as part of the last wave of new divisions created for the Imperial German Army. It was dissolved in 1919.
- Born:
  - Muhammad Mansur Ali, Bangladeshi state leader, third Prime Minister of Bangladesh; in Kuripara, British India (present-day Bangladesh) (d. 1975, assassinated)
  - Justin Ahomadégbé-Tomêtin, Beninese state leader, Premier of Dahomey, now Benin, from 1964 to 1965; in Abomey, Dahomey (present-day Benin) (d. 2002)
  - Carl Karcher, American business leader, founder of the Carl's Jr. hamburger chain; in Upper Sandusky, Ohio, United States (d. 2008)
  - Ibrahim Shams, Egyptian weightlifter, bronze medalist at the 1936 Summer Olympics and gold medalist at the 1948 Summer Olympics; in Alexandria, Egypt (d. 2001)
- Died: George Dewey, 79, American naval officer, only officer to attain the rank of Admiral of the Navy (b. 1837)

== January 17, 1917 (Wednesday) ==
- British intelligence monitoring German telegraph communications intercepted a coded telegram between German Foreign Affairs and the German embassy in Mexico through American diplomat James W. Gerard. It was sent to Room 40 at the British Admiralty where codebreaker Nigel de Grey solved the encryption and uncovered evidence of Germany's plans to spread World War I to North America.
- Born:
  - M. G. Ramachandran, Indian politician and actor, known for romantic leads in films including Alibaba and the Forty Thieves and One in a Thousand, third Chief Minister of Tamil Nadu; as Maruthur Gopalan Ramachandran, in Kandy, British Ceylon (present-day Sri Lanka) (d. 1987)
  - Jocko Thompson, American baseball player, pitcher for the Philadelphia Phillies from 1948 to 1951; as John Samuel Thompson, in Beverly, Massachusetts, United States (d. 1988)

== January 18, 1917 (Thursday) ==
- Ottoman forces under command of Fakhri Pasha began to retreat from the Arabian port of Medina.
- Pancho Villa Expedition – The United States Army was ordered to end its search for Pancho Villa and return to the United States.
- Royal Navy destroyer HMS Ferret was torpedoed and damaged in the English Channel southeast of Isle of Wight by German submarine SM UC-21, with the loss of one crew member. She was repaired and returned to service.
- The city of El Segundo, California, was incorporated.
- Born:
  - Kenneth Mayhew, British army officer, recipient of the Military Order of William of the Netherlands for action at the Battle of Overloon during World War II; in Helmingham, England (d. 2021)
  - Lin Wang, military elephant, served the Chinese Expeditionary Force during World War II, lead attraction at the Taipei Zoo (d. 2003)
- Died: Victor Bruce, 67, British noble and state leader, 14th Viceroy of India, 25th Secretary of State for the Colonies, son of Lord James Bruce (b. 1849)

== January 19, 1917 (Friday) ==
- A blast at a munitions factory in London killed 73 and injured over 400 workers, with the resulting fire causing over £2,000,000 worth of damage.
- British submarines HMS E36 and HMS E43 collided with each other in the North Sea. HMS E36 sank with the loss of all 30 crew.
- Born: Graham Higman, British mathematician, leading contributor to group theory; in Louth, Lincolnshire, England (d. 2008)
- Died: Edward Robert Robson, 80, English architect, chief architect for the London School Board from 1871 to 1876 (b. 1836)

== January 20, 1917 (Saturday) ==
- An 6.5 magnitude earthquake killed at least 1,500 people on the island of Bali in the Dutch East Indies (now Indonesia).
- Born: Amelia Piccinini, Italian athlete, silver medalist in shot put at the 1948 Summer Olympics; in Alessandria, Kingdom of Italy (present-day Italy) (d. 1979)
- Died: Amédée Bollée, 73, French inventor and bellfounder, known for his steam car prototypes including L'Obéissante and La Mancelle (b. 1844)

== January 21, 1917 (Sunday) ==
- Senussi campaign — A British column under command of Brigadier-General Henry Hodgson was dispatched to raid the oasis Siwa in North Africa and capture Senussi rebel leader Sayed Ahmed.
- Tipperary beat Kilkenny 5–4 and 3–2 in the All-Ireland Senior Hurling Championship before a crowd of 5,000 at Croke Park in Dublin.
- Born: Erling Persson, Swedish business leader, founder of H&M; in Borlänge, Sweden (d. 2002)

== January 22, 1917 (Monday) ==
- U.S. President Woodrow Wilson made his famous "peace without victory" speech before a joint session with United States Congress, maintaining that while the United States would remain neutral during World War I, it could play a role as a major peace broker in the near future.
- German submarine SM U-76 collided with a Russian trawler and sank in the Arctic Ocean with the loss of a crew member.
- The sorority Kappa Beta Gamma was established at Marquette University in Milwaukee.
- The Charlie Chaplin comedy Easy Street premiered, with Chaplin's The Tramp playing a beat cop assigned to the roughest neighborhood in the city. Edna Purviance, a regular lead in his films, played a damsel in distress.
- Born:
  - Michael Elkins, American journalist, foreign correspondent for CBS News and BBC News; in New York City, United States (d. 2001)
  - Bruce Shand, British noble and army officer, father to Camilla, Duchess of Cornwall, commander of the 12th Royal Lancers during World War II; in London, England (d. 2006)
- Died:
  - Emma Miller, 77, Australian political activist, leading suffragist leader in Australia and co-founder of the Australian Labor Party (b. 1839)
  - Bérenger Saunière, 64, French clergy, his refusal to leave the parish Rennes-le-Château in France and continuing to practice priestly duties after being defrocked led to conspiracy theories that featured prominently in the book The Holy Blood and the Holy Grail (b. 1852)

== January 23, 1917 (Tuesday) ==
- British cargo ship Flaminian was launched by W Harkness & Sons Ltd in Middlesbrough, England. It would serve Ellerman Lines until 1944 when it was purchased by the British Ministry of War Transport for Operation Pluto.
- A partial solar eclipse occurred that was visible through much of the Middle East and Eastern Europe.

== January 24, 1917 (Wednesday) ==
- An earthquake measuring 6.3 in magnitude struck Anhui Province, China, causing 101 deaths.
- Born:
  - Ernest Borgnine, American actor, best known for his film roles in From Here to Eternity, The Wild Bunch, and The Poseidon Adventure, and television roles including McHale's Navy, Airwolf, and SpongeBob SquarePants, recipient of the Academy Award for Best Actor for Marty; as Ermes Effron Borgnino, in Hamden, Connecticut, United States (d. 2012)
  - L. Fletcher Prouty, American air force officer, Chief of Special Operations for the Joint Chiefs of Staff under U.S. President John F. Kennedy and noted contributor of conspiracy theories around the Kennedy assassination; as Leroy Fletcher Prouty, in Springfield, Massachusetts, United States (d. 2001)
  - Howard Sims, American tap dancer, best known for his collaboration with the Apollo Theater; in Fort Smith, Arkansas, United States (d. 2003)
  - Hans-Ekkehard Bob, German air force officer, commander of the Luftwaffe squadrons Jagdgeschwader 3 and 51 during World War II, recipient of the Knight's Cross of the Iron Cross; in Freiburg im Breisgau, German Empire (present-day Germany) (d. 2013)
  - Archibald Winskill, British air force officer, commander of various squadrons during World War II including No. 17 Squadron, recipient of the Order of the British Empire, Distinguished Flying Cross and Royal Victorian Order; in Penrith, Cumbria, England (d. 2005)
- Died: Sophia Morrison, 57, English preservationist, promoter and preserver of the culture of the Isle of Man (b. 1859)

== January 25, 1917 (Thursday) ==
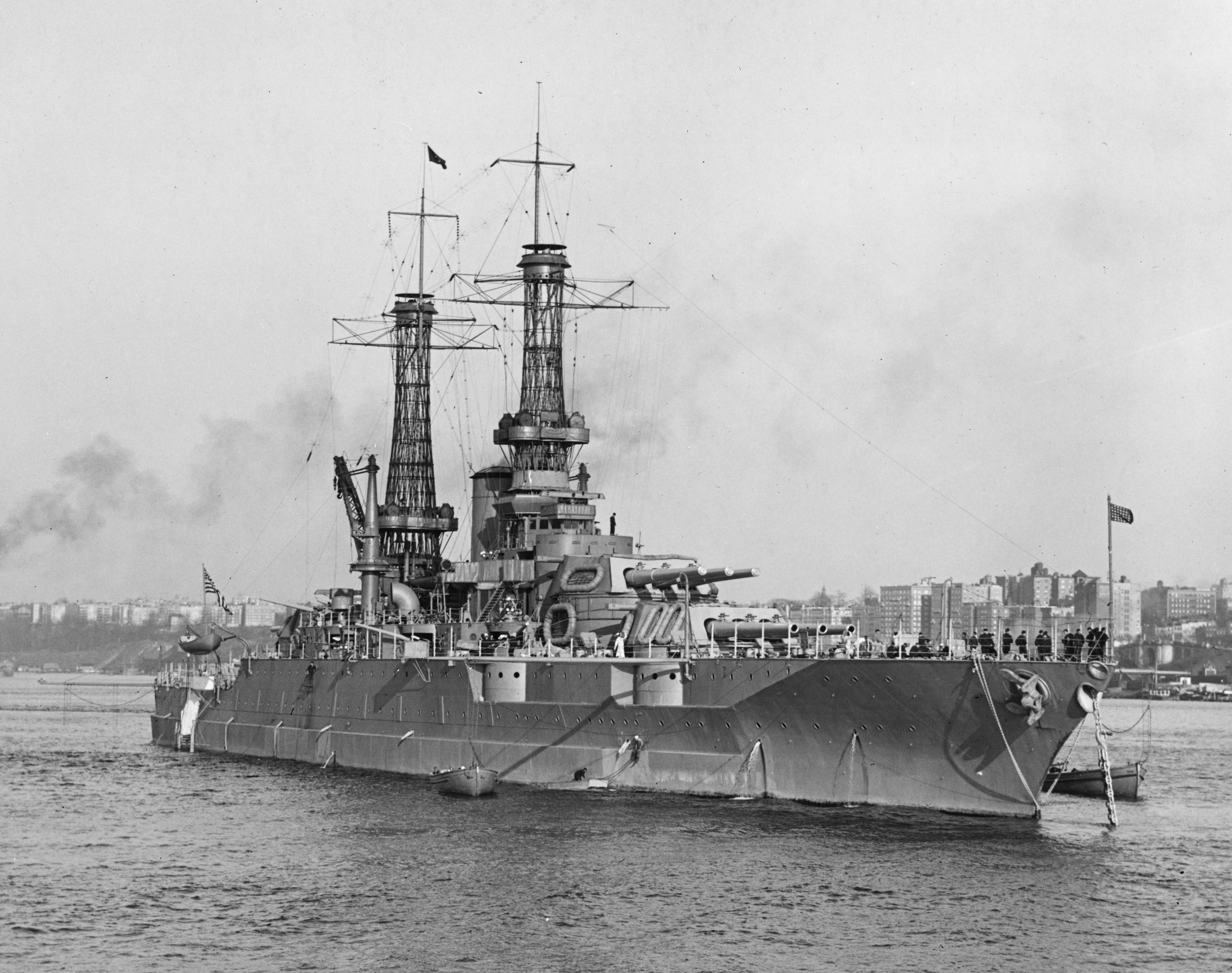
USS Mississippi anchored off New York City, a year after it was launched.

- British merchant ship SS Laurentic struck a mine and sank off the coast of Ireland with the loss of 354 of the 475 passengers and crew on board.
- The U.S. Navy battleship Mississippi was launched by Newport News Shipbuilding in Newport News, Virginia. The battleship was most famous for supporting the major amphibious operations during World War II against the Japanese in the Pacific before it was decommissioned in 1956.
- An anti-prostitution drive by police closed about 200 prostitution houses in Barbary Coast, San Francisco.
- Born:
  - Ilya Prigogine, Russian-Belgian physicist and chemist, recipient of the Nobel Prize in Chemistry for research into dissipative systems, author of The End of Certainty; in Moscow, Russian Empire (present-day Russia) (d. 2003)
  - Jânio Quadros, Brazilian state leader, 22nd President of Brazil; in Campo Grande, Brazil (d. 1992)
  - Edna Andrade, American artist, one of the original op art members in the United States; in Portsmouth, Virginia, United States (d. 2008)
- Died: Nokutela Dube, 43-44, South African educator, co-founder with husband John Langalibalele Dube of Ohlange High School, the first school founded by native South Africans (b. 1873)

== January 26, 1917 (Friday) ==
- A border skirmish between a Utah Army National Guard unit and Mexican rebels resulted in 10 Mexican casualties, the last military engagement before American forces pulled out of Mexico at the end of the Pancho Villa Expedition.
- A violent storm breached sea defenses at the English village of Hallsands, leading to all but one of the houses becoming uninhabitable.
- Born:
  - Louis Zamperini, American runner and air force officer, top-10 competitor in the 1936 Summer Olympics, recipient of the Distinguished Flying Cross, whose experiences as a prisoner of war of the Japanese during World War II became the subject of the film Unbroken; in Olean, New York, United States (d. 2014)
  - William Verity Jr., American politician, 27th United States Secretary of Commerce; as Calvin William Verity Jr., in Middletown, Ohio, United States (d. 2007)

== January 27, 1917 (Saturday) ==
- Alfredo González Flores, President of Costa Rica, was overthrown in a military coup by his fellow cabinet member Federico Tinoco Granados and his brother José Joaquín, resulting in a two-year dictatorship in Costa Rica.
- Born:
  - Tufton Beamish, British politician, Member of Parliament for Lewes from 1945 to 1974, recipient of the Military Cross for actions during the Battle of France in World War II; in Dunfermline, Scotland (d. 1989)
  - John Pattison, New Zealand air force officer, commander of the No. 485 Squadron during the World War II, recipient of the Distinguished Service Order, Distinguished Flying Cross and Legion of Honour; in Waipawa, New Zealand (d. 2009)

== January 28, 1917 (Sunday) ==
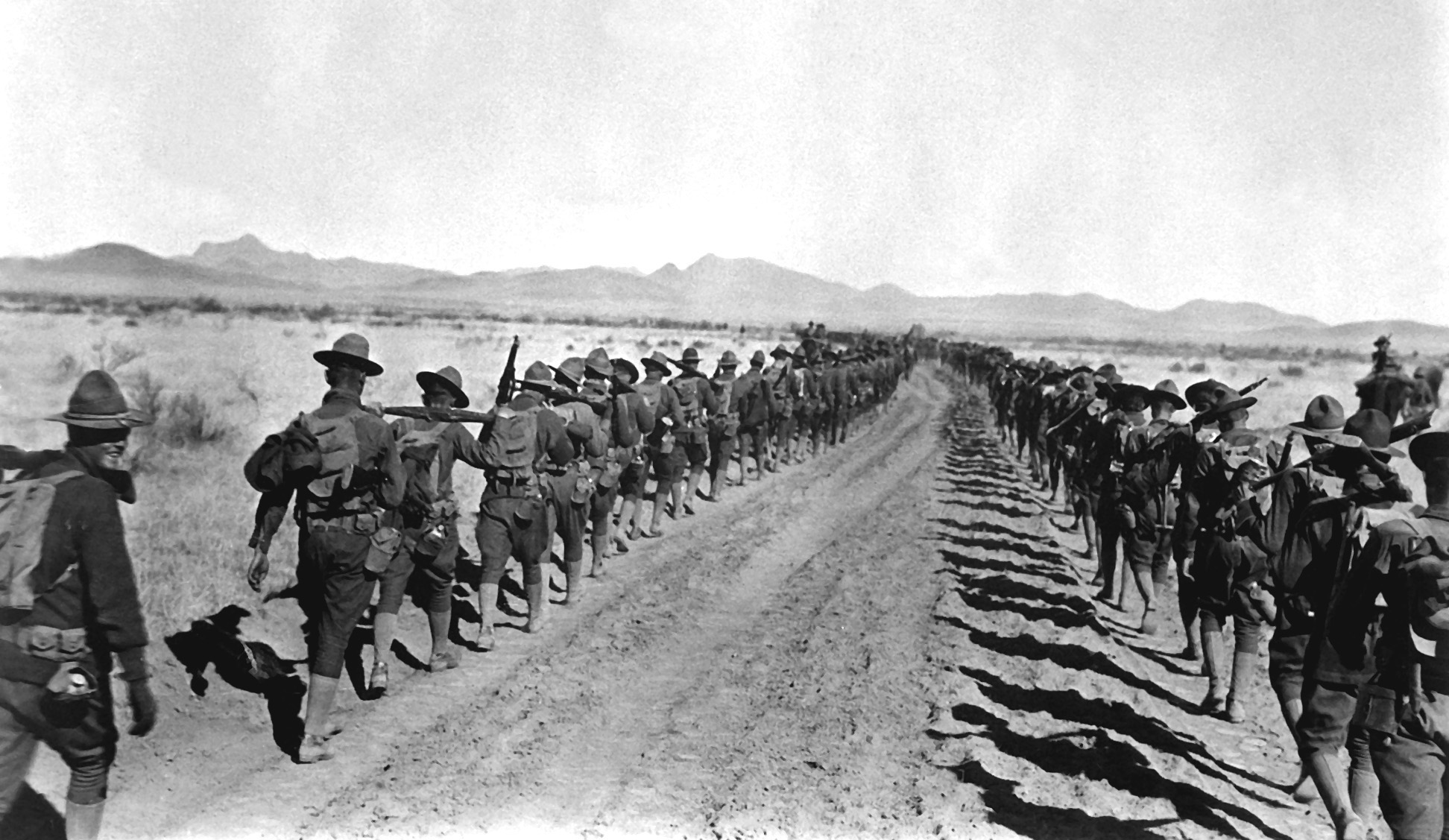
American troops trek back to the United States after the Pancho Villa Expedition is called off.

- Pancho Villa Expedition – U.S. forces in Mexico under command of John J. Pershing began their return to the United States.
- French troopship Amiral Magon was torpedoed and sunk in the Mediterranean Sea by German submarine SM U-39 with the loss of 203 lives.
- Riots broke out at the El Paso–Juárez border crossing between Mexico and the United States over issues of treatment of Mexicans by U.S. immigrant officials, especially for allegations of abuse during health screenings.
- The first test flight of the Junkers aircraft was conducted.
- Died:
  - Prince Qing, 78, Chinese noble, first Prime Minister of the Imperial Cabinet (b. 1838)
  - Christian Streit White, 77, American army officer, commander of the 13th and 23rd Virginia Infantry Regiment during the American Civil War (b. 1839)

== January 29, 1917 (Monday) ==
- British submarine HMS K13 sank in Gare Loch, Scotland with the loss of 32 of the 80 people on board. She was subsequently salvaged, repaired and returned to service as HMS K22.
- Riots at the El Paso–Juárez border crossing between Mexico and the United States intensified, forcing Mexican authorities in Juárez to crack down with arrests.
- French artist Auguste Rodin married his mistress Rose Beuret, but she died two weeks later. Rodin became seriously ill himself and died in November.
- The Swedish film drama A Man There Was, directed by Victor Sjöström, was released, and would later be considered the start of the Golden Age of Swedish Cinema.
- Born:
  - John Raitt, American actor and singer, best known for his leading man roles in musicals including Carousel, Oklahoma!, and The Pajama Game; in Santa Ana, California, United States (d. 2005)
  - David Rubitsky, American soldier, campaigned that he was denied the Medal of Honor for action during the New Guinea campaign in World War II because he was Jewish (d. 2013)
- Died: Evelyn Baring, 75, British noble and state leader, first Consul-General of Egypt (b. 1841)

== January 30, 1917 (Tuesday) ==
- Riots at the El Paso–Juárez border crossing between Mexico and the United States ended with three arrests. Changes were made to processing migrants, including having an observing Mexican official on the U.S. side and allowing Mexican health certificates to be recognized.
- The one-act opera Eine florentinische Tragödie by Austrian composer Alexander von Zemlinsky premiered at the Staatsoper Stuttgart in Stuttgart, Germany.
- The Genealogical Society of Finland was founded in Helsinki and has grown to its current roster of 6,000 members.
- Born: Sam LoPresti, American ice hockey player, goaltender for the Chicago Blackhawks from 1937 to 1951; as Samuel Leo LoPresti, in Elcor, Minnesota, United States (d. 1984)

== January 31, 1917 (Wednesday) ==
- Germany announced it was rescinding the "Sussex pledge" and would resume unrestricted submarine warfare in the Atlantic Ocean.
- Born:
  - Frank Gill, New Zealand air force officer and politician, member of the No. 75 Squadron during the Battle of Britain and recipient of the Distinguished Service Order, Member of New Zealand Parliament from 1969 to 1980, 27th Minister of Defence and 24th Minister of Health; as Thomas Francis Gill, in Wellington, New Zealand (d. 1982)
  - Fred Bassetti, American architect, known for many Seattle landmarks including the Henry M. Jackson Federal Building and Seattle Municipal Tower; in Seattle, United States (d. 2013)
  - Jini Dellaccio, American photographer, best known for her portraits of rock and pop acts in the 1960s including Neil Young, The Rolling Stones, The Beach Boys, and The Who; as Jini Duckworth, in Indiana, United States (d. 2014)
- Died:
  - Henry Ashington, 25, English Olympic track and field athlete; killed in action near Combles (b. 1891)
  - Henry Bracy, 71, Welsh opera singer, known for his work with the Gaiety Theatre, London and the J. C. Williamson organization (b. 1846)
