= E43 =

E43, E-43 or E.43 may refer to:

- European route E43, a road in central Europe
- HMS E43, a United Kingdom E-class submarine commissioned in 1915
- M113 E43, a version of the Mercedes-Benz M113 engine
