= Franciszek Kornicki =

Polish fighter pilot (1916–2017)

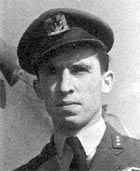
- Franciszek Kornicki, 1943
- Born: 18 December 1916; Wereszyn, Lublin Governorate, Vistula Land, Russian Empire (now Wereszyn, Poland)
- Died: 16 November 2017 (aged 100); Worthing, England
- Military career
- Allegiance: Poland; France; United Kingdom
- Branch: Polish Air Force; French Air Force; Royal Air Force
- Service years: 1939–1972
- Rank: Pułkownik (Polish Air Force); Squadron Leader (RAF)
- Commands: No. 308 Polish Fighter Squadron (1943); No. 317 Polish Fighter Squadron (1943)
- Conflicts: Second World War
- Awards: Virtuti Militari; Polish Cross of Valour (with two bars)

Franciszek Kornicki (18 December 1916 – 16 November 2017) was a Polish fighter pilot who served in the Polish Air Force in Poland, France and Britain during the Second World War and later served in the Royal Air Force (RAF). He died just a few weeks short of his 101st birthday and was the last surviving Polish fighter squadron commander from the Second World War.

== Early life and education ==
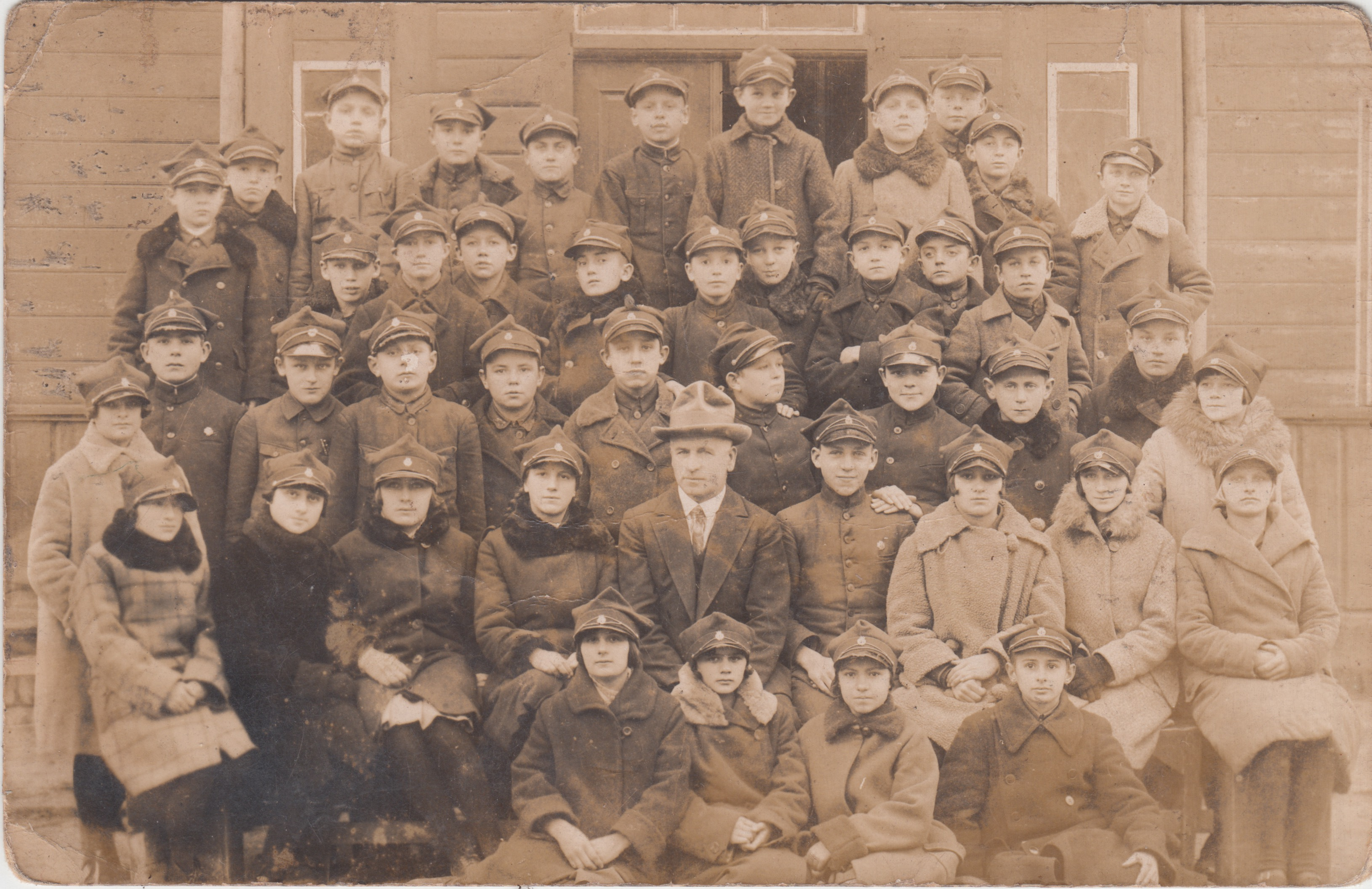
Kornicki's class in the Gymnazium in Hrubieszów. Kornicki is just behind the teacher's hat on the left. (Source: family archive)

Kornicki was born at Wereszyn, south of Hrubieszów, in Poland, on 18 December 1916, the sixth son of Łukasz Kornicki, a coachman on a large estate, and his wife, Aniela Kornicka. He went to the village school in Wereszyn and then the gymnasium in Hrubieszów, where he boarded and covered his expenses by coaching less able pupils.

== Forces career ==
Eager to further his education but unable to afford university fees, he was admitted as a cadet in the twelfth entry at the Polish Air Force academy in Dęblin. In July 1939, he completed his studies, where he finished in third place out of a class of 173 pupils. In the middle of a fortnight's leave prior to his first posting, he received orders to report to his unit immediately in the general mobilisation as the clouds of war were gathering and said his goodbyes to his family. He never saw his father again, and did not see his mother and brothers again for another 25 years.

== German invasion ==
When the German armies invaded Poland on 1 September 1939, he was a member of 162 squadron, flying outdated PZL P.7 aircraft without radios; the German fighters were superior in all respects. The Polish Air Force was heavily outnumbered and losses were heavy, so the fighter squadrons were constantly being pulled back and regrouped. On 17 September pilots were informed at a briefing that the Soviet Army, at that time allied with Nazi Germany, had crossed the border and was moving westwards through Poland and that, to continue the fight, they were to fly to Romania and make their way to France. Those who were without aeroplanes, including Kornicki, who found that his had been taken while he had been at the briefing, were to make their way to Romania overland. With several fellow pilots he crossed into Romania that night. By road and rail they travelled to the port of Balchik, which was then part of Romania, avoiding internment and being provided with false papers by the Polish embassy, and they then sailed with many other airmen on the SS Patris to Marseille. It was several months before flying training on the Morane 406 French fighter aircraft was provided, and shortly after Kornicki finished his training news of the French capitulation came through. Together with several thousand other Poles he made his way to Saint-Jean-de-Luz in the Basque country and was evacuated aboard the Arandora Star to Liverpool, where his first task was to start learning English.

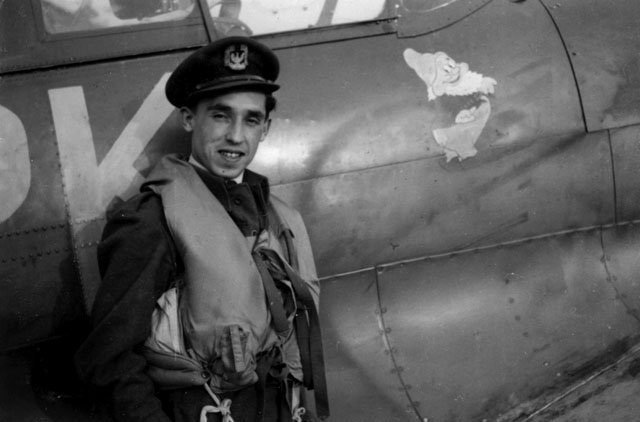
Franciszek Kornicki (Source: family archive)

== Britain ==
By August 1940 the Polish Air Force already had more than 8,000 men on its strength in Britain; eventually it consisted of sixteen fighter and bomber squadrons, operationally subordinate to the RAF, that had been formed. After flight training on the Boulton Paul Defiant he was posted on 11 October 1940 to 303 Squadron, just after it moved north to rest and reform after achieving in six weeks the highest score of all the squadrons that took part in the Battle of Britain. On joining 303 Squadron he converted to the Hawker Hurricane. In January 1941 he joined 315 Squadron, which in July moved to RAF Northolt and was re-equipped with Spitfire MkIIs. On 23 July he flew his first mission over France, with the usual instructions to stick close to his section leader. He described the experience as follows: "We were over twenty thousand feet with France below us when I heard on the RT [radio transmitter] that enemy aircraft were approaching, and later there were reports of attacks and warning shouts—somebody was fighting somewhere. I thought we were moving about a bit nervously when I remembered the golden rule: never fly straight and level for any length of time, and so I too weaved behind my energetic leader, trying desperately not to collide with anybody and not to lose him. I managed, but I did not see much else except him and my immediate neighbours. Our squadron was not molested and we all came back in one piece. I landed drenched with perspiration, jumped out of my aircraft, lit a cigarette and inhaled deeply".

On 13 February 1943, he took over command of No. 308 Polish Fighter Squadron: at 26 he was the youngest squadron commander in the Polish Air Force and the first from the twelfth entry at Dęblin to reach such a position. At the end of the month he came down with appendicitis. On 7 May he became commanding officer of No. 317 Polish Fighter Squadron, which he led until December 1943. From January 1944, having survived over three years as a fighter pilot, Kornicki was transferred to a ground job as a liaison officer. He then attended the Polish Air Force Staff College in Weston-Super-Mare, after which he served in staff positions at 84 Group HQ, 2nd Tactical Air Force, in the Netherlands, Belgium and Germany. As a staff officer he was forbidden to fly operational sorties, but he had just received permission to retrain on the latest model of Spitfire when the war in Europe came to an end. For his wartime service he was awarded the Silver Cross of the Virtuti Militari (War Order No. 08487) and the Cross of Valour with two bars.

== Post-war ==
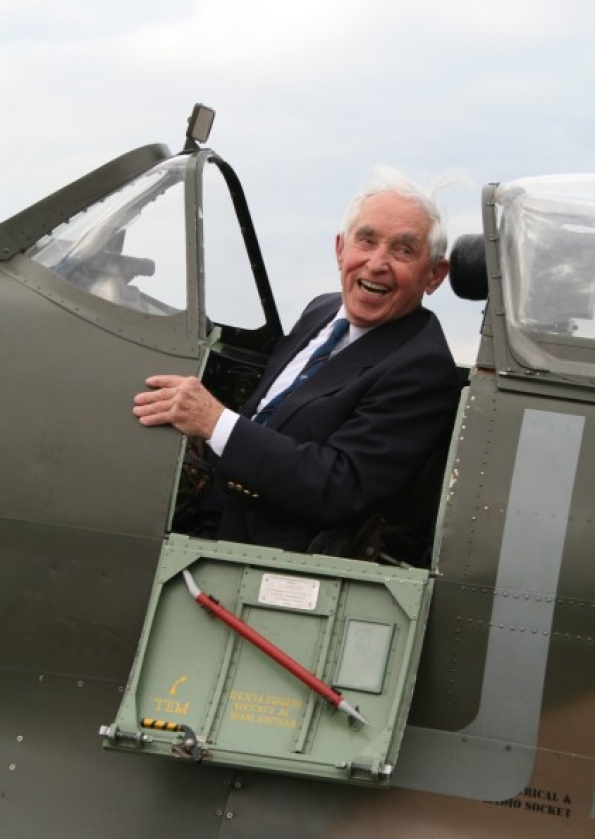
Kornicki reunited with a Spitfire he flew in 1942

Like many of his fellow-countrymen, Kornicki was dismayed by the 1945 Yalta Agreement, which effectively ceded Poland to the Soviets, and had no wish to return to Poland after the end of the war. Kornicki joined a course at Nottingham Technical College. On 6 March 1948 he married Patience Ceridwen Williams (known as Pat), daughter of Ewart and Enid Williams, and they began a career as hotel managers for Symonds Brewery. They had two sons, Peter Kornicki and Richard Kornicki. In June 1951, responding to an appeal for pilots for the RAF, which was expanding in response to Cold War pressures, he received a short-service commission as a Flight Lieutenant in the RAF and resumed flying. In May 1953 he switched to the Catering Branch and served on RAF stations in England, Malta, Aden and Cyprus. He was promoted to Squadron Leader on 1 January 1961, and retired from the RAF on 8 January 1972. He subsequently worked for the Gas Industry Training Board and then for the Ministry of Defence.

Kornicki's memorabilia, including log-book, French goggles and the attaché case he was issued with at Dęblin in 1936, are in the Polish Museum at RAF Northolt. One of the aircraft he flew, Spitfire MkVB BM 597, is still flying in the colours of 317 Squadron: he was reunited with it at RAF Northolt on the occasion of the 70th anniversary of the Battle of Britain in September 2010, Kornicki then being 93. On 16 June 2011 he was awarded the Commander's Cross of the Order of Polonia Restituta, which was conferred upon him in person on 24 September 2012 by the President of Poland Bronisław Komorowski. On 11 November 2012 he was promoted to the rank of full colonel (Pułkownik) in the Polish Air Force. He turned 100 in December 2016. In autumn 2017, in preparation for its centenary in 2018, the RAF Museum organised a poll to select 'The People's Spitfire Pilot' to be featured alongside a Spitfire Mk VB at the Museum's RAF centenary exhibition. Eleven pilots from differing backgrounds were nominated, and Kornicki was the runaway winner with over 325,000 votes (the second placed, British, pilot had 6,300). This was widely reported in the Polish press and on Polish television and radio. In October 2017 he was awarded the Gold Medal of Merit for National Defence by the Polish Minister of Defence.

He died on 16 November 2017 at the Sussex Clinic, a nursing home in Worthing. His wife, Pat, died ten days later, on 26 November. Their joint funeral took place on 30 November 2017 at St Michael's Church, Worthing, in the presence of the Polish ambassador and the head of the Polish Air Force, and they were interred at Northwood Cemetery, in a plot beside the Polish Air Force war graves. The Polish Air Force provided pall-bearers and colour parties, the Queen's Colour Squadron of the RAF Regiment lined the route with arms reversed, and there was a fly-past by an aircraft of 32 (The Royal) Squadron based at RAF Northolt.

He was posthumously promoted to the rank of Generał Brygady by the President of Poland, Andrzej Duda, in a ceremony held at the Polish Embassy in London on 3 December 2019.

== Works ==
- Polish Air Force – Chronicle of Main Events (1993)
- The Struggle: Biography of a Fighter Pilot (2008) ISBN 978-83-89450-80-7
- Zmagania (2009) [This contains many more original photographs than the English edition]
- Zmagania (2nd edition, 2017) [This contains a new preface, some additional material and more photographs than the first edition] ISBN 978-83-8098-342-7
