= Cecília Schelingová =

Slovak martyr

Blessed Cecília Schelingová SCSC
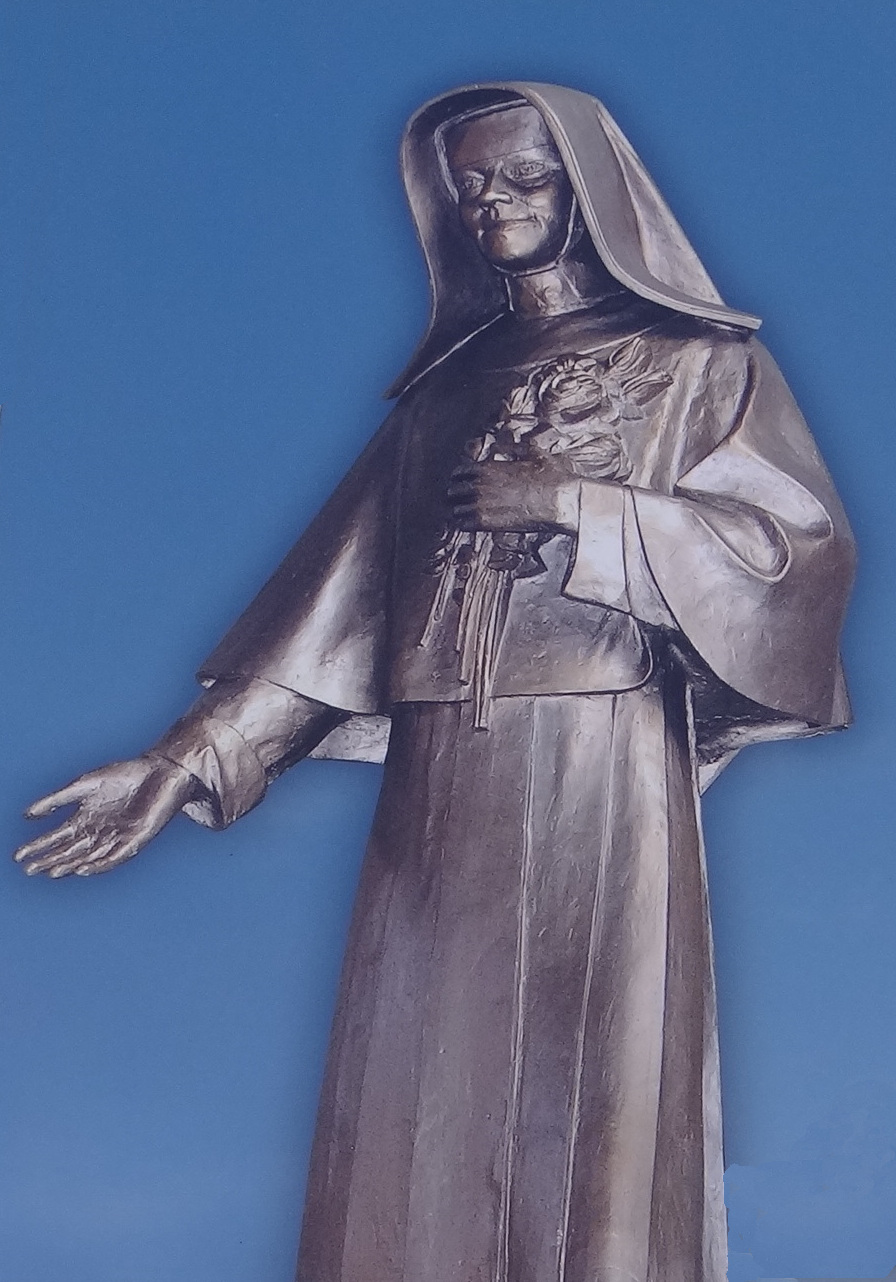
- Statue in Krivá

Martyr
- Born: 24 December 1916; Krivá na Orave, Dolný Kubín, Austro-Hungarian Empire
- Died: 31 July 1955 (aged 38); Trnava, Czechoslovakia
- Venerated in: Roman Catholic Church
- Beatified: 14 September 2003, Petržalka Square, Bratislava, Slovakia by Pope John Paul II
- Feast: 23 November

Cecília Schelingová (24 December 1916 – 31 July 1955), also known as Zdenka Schelingová, was a Slovak Roman Catholic religious sister of the Congregation of the Sisters of Charity of the Holy Cross and a victim of communist persecution in the former Czechoslovakia. Schelingová worked for the most part in the hospital at Bratislava before her arrest and aided priests fleeing persecution from the totalitarian communist regime in her home nation.

The beatification was celebrated on 14 September 2003 on the occasion of Pope John Paul II visiting Slovakia.

== Life ==
Cecília Schelingová was born at Krivá na Orave as the tenth of eleven children to Pavol Scheling and Zuzana Pániková on 24 December 1916 and was baptized right after her birth.

Her initial studies spanned from 1922 until 1930 and her call to the religious life began to blossom in 1929 when the Sisters of Charity of the Holy Cross arrived in her hometown to teach there. On 6 July 1931, with her mother going with her to the motherhouse, she requested to join the congregation. The congregation requested that she completed a nursing course as well as a radiological course before entering. The postulant then commenced her novitiate on 28 January 1936. She made her first vows on 30 January 1937 while assuming the religious name Zdenka. Since 1937, Schelingová worked at a hospital in Humenné in Eastnern Slovakia, before relocating to a hospital in Bratislava in 1942, where she worked in the radiological department. She made her solemn profession on 28 January 1943. In 1952 she began to serve in the x-ray area.

Following the February 1948 Communist coup d'état, mass persecution of religious and priest alike commenced with countless arrested and tortured, with many requiring medical attention. Schelingová aided the ailing priest Sandtner and celebrated forbidden Mass with him and managed to get him to remain in hospital when authorities deemed his condition to have improved instead of watching him being sent back to prison. In February 1952 she aided the politically vocal condemned priest Stefan Kostial flee from his fate which would have been death in Siberia when she slipped sleeping pills into a guard's tea allowing the priest to flee; she organized this on 19 February – a day before the priest was to appear in court. Kostial had been jailed and then hospitalized after being tortured.

On 29 February 1952 she attempted to aid three priests and three seminarians flee but she failed to do this and was instead arrested and tortured. Before her court appearance she lived in a cold and windowless cell. Schelingová was sentenced on 17 June 1952 to twelve years imprisonment and from that point to 1955 she was sent from prison to prison (such as in Bratislava and Brno) where she was often beaten and tortured in an attempt to get her to name accomplices. Schelingová developed breast cancer and was admitted to a prison ward of the Prague hospital in 1954 where she was given a partial mastectomy without anesthesia. Helen Korda, a political prisoner who herself underwent an operation around the same time, agreed to look after the recovering Schelingová.

Apolónia Galis (d. 21 June 2003) visited her in prison with a guard present though secretly bought her cakes with vitamins contained in them in order to take care of her health. Government officials secured her release from prison on 16 April 1955 - a decade before her actual release date - so that she would not die on the government's watch. But police harassment saw her no longer welcome at the motherhouse of her congregation and from the hospital where she worked. It was Galis who lived in Trnava took her in. She was admitted into the Trnava hospital on 19 April 1955 and she remained there in ill health until her death.

Schelingová died at dawn on 31 July 1955 after she received the last rites. Her remains were relocated in 1979 and then for the final time on 6 June 2003. On 6 April 1970 the regional Bratislava court ruled that the late sister was in fact innocent having received a "false and artificial accusation" that had been motivated for political purposes rather that in the pursuit of justice.

== Beatification ==
The beatification process commenced on 22 February 2000 after the Congregation for the Causes of Saints issued the "nihil obstat" to the cause. The diocesan process closed on 12 January 2003 which led to the Congregation of the Causes of Saints validating the process on 31 January 2003 in Rome. The pope approved the cause on 7 July 2003 and determined that her persecution and her declining health after her prison time made her a martyr. She was beatified by Pope John Paul II on 14 September 2003 when the pope visited Slovakia. Her niece Marge Van Lierde - along with her husband and two children - attended the celebration.

A miracle due to the intercession of the Blessed was investigated in the Archdiocese of Denver in the United States of America and Archbishop Samuel Joseph Aquila oversaw the start of the diocesan process on 16 October 2013 and its conclusion on 28 February 2016. The current postulator assigned to this cause is the Rev. Ľudovít Pokojný.
