= HMS E36 =

Submarine of the Royal Navy

History

United Kingdom
- Name: E36
- Builder: John Brown, Clydebank
- Laid down: 7 January 1915
- Launched: 16 September 1916
- Commissioned: 16 November 1916
- Fate: Sunk after collision, 19 January 1917

General characteristics
- Class & type: E-class submarine
- Displacement: 662 long tons (673 t) (surfaced); 807 long tons (820 t) (submerged)
- Length: 181 ft (55 m)
- Beam: 15 ft (4.6 m)
- Installed power: 1,600 hp (1,200 kW) (diesel engines); 840 hp (630 kW) (electric motors)
- Propulsion: 2 × 800 hp (600 kW) diesel engines; 2 × 420 hp (310 kW) electric motors; 2 × screws
- Speed: 15 kn (17 mph; 28 km/h) (surfaced); 10 kn (12 mph; 19 km/h) (submerged)
- Range: 3,000 nmi (3,500 mi; 5,600 km) at 10 kn (12 mph; 19 km/h) (surfaced); 65 nmi (75 mi; 120 km) at 5 kn (5.8 mph; 9.3 km/h) (surfaced)
- Complement: 31
- Armament: 5 × 18 inch (450 mm) torpedo tubes (2 bow, 2 beam, 1 stern); 1 × 12-pounder gun

HMS E36 was an E-class submarine built by John Brown, Clydebank for the Royal Navy. She was laid down on 7 January 1915 and was commissioned on 16 November 1916.

E36 was sunk in a collision with E43 off Harwich in the North Sea on 19 January 1917. There were no survivors. On 15 September 2013, Dutch fisherman Hans Eelman found a large metal object near the island of Texel, using sonar. The object was thought to be the wreck of a submarine of the E-type and was thought to be E36, but later reports proved it was not.

== Design ==
Like all post-E8 British E-class submarines, E36 had a displacement of 662 long tons (673 t) at the surface and 807 long tons (820 t) while submerged. She had a total length of 180 feet (55 m) and a beam of 22 feet 8.5 inches (6.922 m). She was powered by two 800 horsepower (600 kW) Vickers eight-cylinder two-stroke diesel engines and two 420 horsepower (310 kW) electric motors. The submarine had a maximum surface speed of 16 knots (30 km/h; 18 mph) and a submerged speed of 10 knots (19 km/h; 12 mph). British E-class submarines had fuel capacities of 50 long tons (51 t) of diesel and ranges of 3,255 miles (5,238 km; 2,829 nmi) when travelling at 10 knots (19 km/h; 12 mph). E36 was capable of operating submerged for five hours when travelling at 5 knots (9.3 km/h; 5.8 mph).

E36 was armed with a 12-pounder 76 mm (3.0 in) QF gun mounted forward of the conning tower. She had five 18 inch (450 mm) torpedo tubes, two in the bow, one either side amidships, and one in the stern; a total of 10 torpedoes were carried.

E-Class submarines had wireless systems with 1 kilowatt (1.3 hp) power ratings; in some submarines, these were later upgraded to 3 kilowatts (4.0 hp) systems by removing a midship torpedo tube. Their maximum design depth was 100 feet (30 m) although in service some reached depths of below 200 feet (61 m). Some submarines contained Fessenden oscillator systems.

== Crew ==
Her complement was three officers and 28 men.

== Bibliography ==
- Hutchinson, Robert (2001). Jane's Submarines: War Beneath the Waves from 1776 to the Present Day. London: HarperCollins. ISBN 978-0-00-710558-8. OCLC 53783010.
