= Krivá =

- Municipality
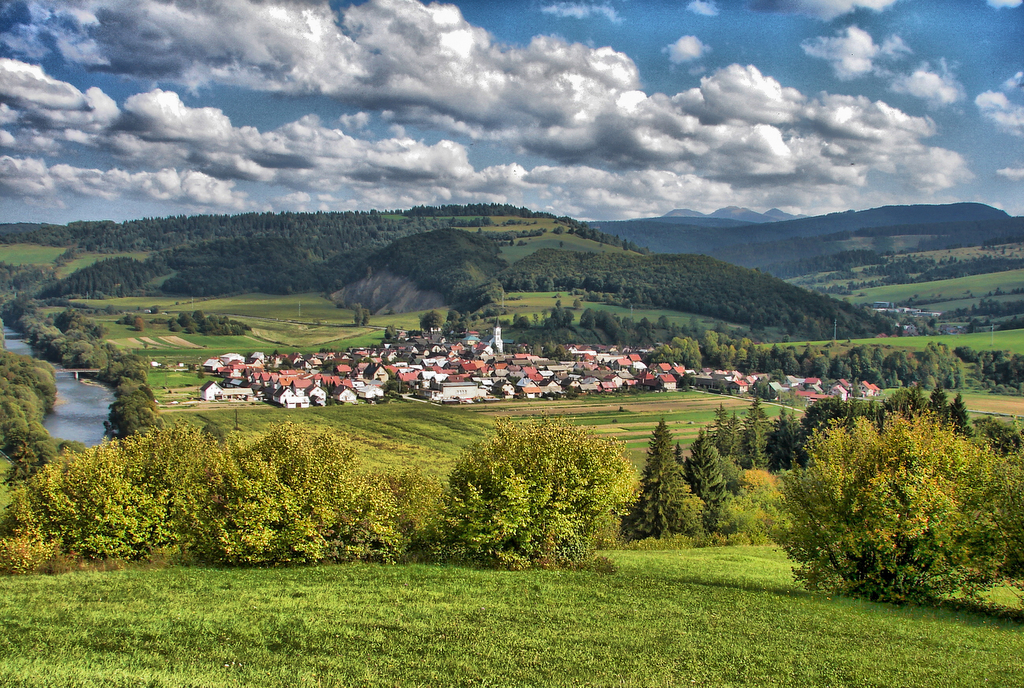

- Flag Coat of arms

- Location of Krivá in the Žilina Region Location of Krivá in Slovakia
- Coordinates: 49.28°N 19.48°E
- Country: Slovakia
- Region: Žilina Region
- District: Dolný Kubín District
- First mentioned: 1575

Area
  - Total: 18.87 km^{2} (7.29 sq mi)
- Elevation: 550 m (1,800 ft)

Population (2025)
  - Total: 804
- Time zone: UTC+1 (CET)
  - Summer (DST): UTC+2 (CEST)
- Postal code: 275 5
- Area code: +421 43
- Vehicle registration plate (until 2022): DK
- Website: www.kriva.sk

Krivá (Hungarian: Kriva) is a village and municipality in Dolný Kubín District in the Žilina Region of northern Slovakia.

== History ==
In historical records the village was first mentioned in 1575. Before the establishment of independent Czechoslovakia in 1918, Krivá was part of Árva County within the Kingdom of Hungary. From 1939 to 1945, it was part of the Slovak Republic.

== Geography ==
The municipality lies at an altitude of 550 metres (1,800 ft) and covers an area of 18.87 km^{2} (7.29 sq mi) (2025).

== Population ==
Population statistic (10 years)
Year	1995	2005	2015	2025
Count	764	808	805	804
Difference		+5.75%	−0.37%	−0.12%

Population statistic
Year	2024	2025
Count	795	804
Difference		+1.13%

It has a population of 804 people (31 December 2025).

=== Ethnicity ===
Census 2021 (1+ %)
Ethnicity	Number	Fraction
Slovak	800	99%
Total	808	

In year 2021 was 808 people by ethnicity 800 as Slovak, 8 as Not found out, 5 as Polish, 4 as Other, 2 as Czech and 1 as Romani.

Note on population: The difference values of population numbers in the table "Population statistic" and in the sections "Ethnicity" & "Religion" is caused by the use of various statistical methods.

=== Religion ===
Census 2021 (1+ %)
Religion	Number	Fraction
Roman Catholic Church	749	92.7%
None	38	4.7%
Total	808	

In year 2021 was 808 people by religion 749 from Roman Catholic Church, 38 from None, 7 from Not found out, 3 from Islam, 3 from Greek Catholic Church, 3 from Evangelical Church, 2 from Christian Congregations in Slovakia, 1 from New Apostolic Church, 1 from Other and 1 from Ad hoc movements.

== Notable people ==
- Blahoslavená Zdenka Cecília Schelingová
