= Wereszyn =

- Village
- Location within Poland
- Coordinates: 50°36′N 23°56′E
- Country: Poland
- Voivodeship: Lublin
- County: Hrubieszów
- Gmina: Mircze

Wereszyn [vɛˈrɛʂɨn] is a village in the administrative district of Gmina Mircze, within Hrubieszów County, Lublin Voivodeship, in eastern Poland, close to the border with Ukraine.
