= February 1917 =

Month in 1917

<<	February 1917					>>
Su	Mo	Tu	We	Th	Fr	Sa
				1	2	3
4	5	6	7	8	9	10
11	12	13	14	15	16	17
18	19	20	21	22	23	24
25	26	27	28

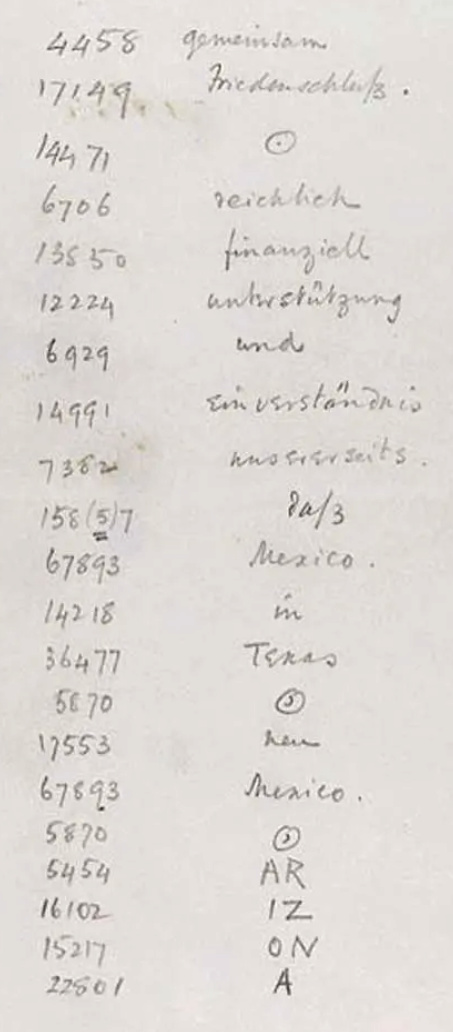
Copy of the decoded Zimmermann Telegram by British intelligence.

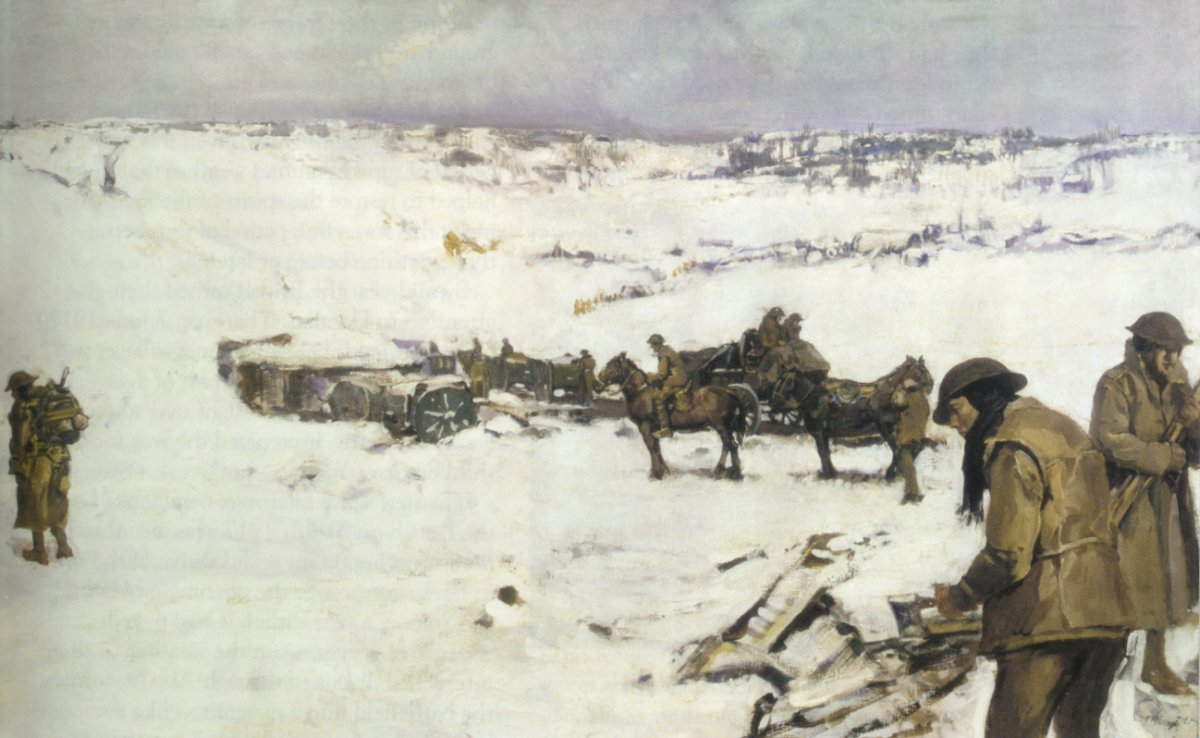
British troops preparing for raids on German defences in the Ancre Valley in northern France.

The first assembly of Sámi people, in Trondheim, Norway.

The following events occurred in February 1917:

== February 1, 1917 (Thursday) ==
- James Alexander Murray became Premier of New Brunswick, replacing George Johnson Clarke who resigned due to health issues. The term was short-lived and he was replaced by Walter Edward Foster within a month.
- British fishing boat Inverlyon was shelled and sunk in the Atlantic Ocean by German submarine SM U-55, with all crew surviving.
- The New Zealand Army Ordnance Department was established.
- The Medical Women's Federation was formed in the United Kingdom to advocate women in the medical profession. The organization started with 190 members including noted physicians Jane Harriett Walker, Catherine Chisholm, Florence Barrett, and Louisa Aldrich-Blake.
- New York City Subway transit stations for the Astoria Line, including Astoria Boulevard, Astoria–Ditmars Boulevard, Broadway, Queensboro Plaza, 30th Avenue, 36th Avenue, and 39th Avenue were opened for service.
- Born: James Harry Lacey, British air force officer, second-highest scoring Royal Air Force flying ace during the Battle of Britain, recipient of the Distinguished Flying Medal; in Wetherby, England (d. 1989)
- Died: Georg Andreas Bull, 87, Norwegian architect, chief designer of the neighborhoods of Homansbyen in Oslo and major train station designer for Norwegian State Railways (b. 1829)

== February 2, (Friday) ==
- The British Fifth Corps launched further raids on German-held territory around the Ancre Valley in France, resulting in 671 British casualties and 176 German prisoners taken.
- Bread rationing was introduced in the United Kingdom.
- Greek cargo ship Elikon was sunk in the Atlantic Ocean off the coast of Spain by German submarine SM U-67 with her crew surviving.
- The first major Australian film comedy, Our Friends, the Hayseeds by Beaumont Smith, premiered in Sydney.
- Born:
  - Đỗ Mười, Vietnamese state leader, 9th General Secretary of the Communist Party of Vietnam; as Nguyễn Duy Cống, in Thanh Trì district, French Indochina (present-day Vietnam) (d. 2018)
  - Natalia Androsova, Russian noble, one of the two surviving members of the House of Romanov following the Russian Revolution; in Tashkent, Russian Empire (present-day Uzbekistan) (d. 1999)
  - Kishan Lal, Indian field hockey player, team captain of the gold medal-winning team at the 1948 Summer Olympics; in Mhow, British India (present-day India) (d. 1980)
- Died:
  - Theophile T. Allain, 70, American politician, member of the Louisiana State Legislature from 1872 to 1886, considered the richest African American businessman at the time (b. 1846)
  - Alexander Walters, 58, American religious leader and activist, bishop of the African Methodist Episcopal Zion Church and president of the National Afro-American Council (b. 1858)

== February 3, 1917 (Saturday) ==
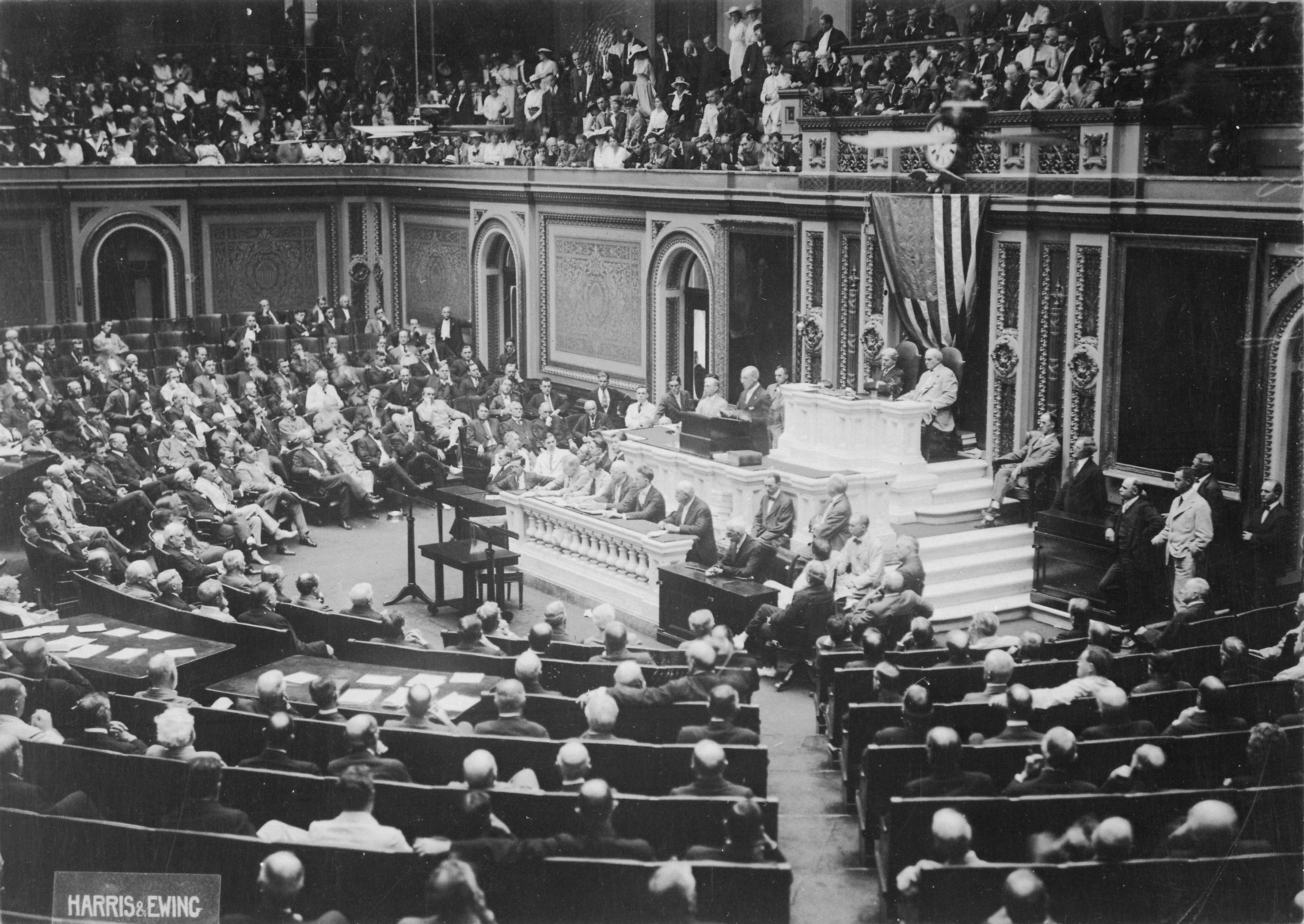
Woodrow Wilson's address to Congress

- U.S. President Woodrow Wilson announced to United States Congress that the government was severing diplomatic ties with Germany over the Imperial German Navy's decision to engage in unlimited submarine warfare.
- Irish nationalist party Sinn Féin gained its first seat when candidate George Noble Plunkett, father of Joseph Plunkett, won the North Roscommon constituency on an abstentionism.
- Senussi campaign — A British column dispatched to capture Senussi rebel leader Sayed Ahmed arrived at the Siwa Oasis in North Africa where they were met with resistance from 1,250 tribesmen sent to protect Ahmed.
- American cargo ship Housatonic was sunk in the Atlantic Ocean by German submarine SM U-53, with her crew surviving.
- The first issue of West Africa magazine was published.
- Born: George G. Blackburn, Canadian soldier and writer, author of The Guns of Normandy; in Wales, Ontario, Canada (d. 2006)
- Died:
  - Robert McNab, 52, New Zealand politician, 20th Minister of Justice (b. 1864)
  - Liang Cheng, 52, Chinese diplomat, Ambassador to the United States from 1902 to 1907 (b. 1864)

== February 4, 1917 (Sunday) ==
- Senussi campaign — Senussi rebels retreated from Siwa in North Africa.
- The Council of Flanders, a quasi-governmental body of the Flemish Movement in German-occupied Belgium, was established.
- Born: Yahya Khan, Pakistani state leader, 3rd President of Pakistan; as Agha Muhammad Yahya Khan, in Chakwal, Punjab, British India (present-day Pakistan) (d. 1980)

== February 5, 1917 (Monday) ==
- The new constitution of Mexico was adopted.
- Both houses of the United States Congress overrode a veto made by U.S. President Woodrow Wilson to reinstate the Immigration Act, which allowed more restrictions on immigration to the United States.
- The United States Army force under command of John J. Pershing reached Columbus, New Mexico, ending the Pancho Villa Expedition.
- Senussi campaign — Senussi rebels successfully held off a British convoy and allowed rebel leader Sayed Ahmed to escape west to Jaghbub, Libya.
- Zimmermann Telegram – British intelligence officer William Reginald Hall, chief of Room 40 for the Admiralty, passed the decoded telegram sent by German State Secretary of Foreign Affairs Arthur Zimmermann to British Foreign Affairs. The telegram entailed a proposed military alliance between Germany and Mexico against the United States should it enter World War I.
- The Luftstreitkräfte, the air arm of the Imperial German Army, established air squadron Jagdstaffel 27.
- English writer Hugh Kingsmill was taken prisoner while fighting in France.
- The Roman Catholic Diocese of Santa Rosa de Osos was established in Colombia.
- Windhoek High School was established in Windhoek, Namibia, as South West Africa's first secondary school and the oldest in the country.
- Morosco Theatre opened on Broadway in New York City with the inaugural production of Canary Cottage by theater owner and producer Oliver Morosco with music by Earl Carroll.
- Born: Isuzu Yamada, Japanese actress, known for roles with popular Japanese film directors including Akira Kurosawa for The Lower Depths, Throne of Blood, and Yojimbo; as Mitsu Yamada, in Osaka, Empire of Japan (present-day Japan) (d. 2012)
- Died:
  - Jaber II Al-Sabah, 56–57, Kuwaiti noble, 8th Emir of Kuwait (b. 1860)
  - Paul Rubens, 41, English songwriter, best known for his musicals including The Shop Girl, San Toy, and Florodora (b. 1875)

== February 6, 1917 (Tuesday) ==
- The first assembly of the Sámi people was held in Trondheim, Norway with the day officially recognized as Sámi National Day.
- Butte County, Idaho, and Camas County, Idaho, were established. Butte County was created using portions of Bingham, Blaine, and Jefferson counties, with its county seat in Arco, Idaho. Camas County was created using a portion of Blaine County with its seat in Fairfield, Idaho.
- Born:
  - José Alonso, Argentine labor leader, General Secretary of the General Confederation of Labour from 1963 to 1970; in Monserrat, Buenos Aires, Argentina (d. 1970, assassinated)
  - Sonny Franzese, Italian American gangster, underboss for the Colombo crime family, oldest prisoner in the U.S. federal prison system; in Naples, Kingdom of Italy (present-day Italy) (d. 2020)
  - Zsa Zsa Gabor, Hungarian-American actress and socialite, known for her film roles in Moulin Rouge and Lovely to Look At, and her many public marriages including Conrad Hilton and George Sanders; as Sári Gábor, in Budapest, Austria-Hungary (present-day Hungary) (d. 2016)
  - Arnold Spielberg, American electronics engineer, co-developer of the GE-200 series mainframe computer, father to film director Steven Spielberg; in Cincinnati, United States (d. 2020)

== February 7, 1917 (Wednesday) ==
- British ocean liner California was torpedoed and sunk in the Atlantic Ocean by German submarine SM U-85, killing 43 people.
- British cargo ship Saint Ninian was torpedoed and sunk in the North Sea by German submarine SM UB-34 with the loss of 15 crew.
- Suffering progressive damage due to a series of crashes in bad visibility and poor weather, the Imperial German Navy Zeppelin L 36 crashed onto the Aller river and was destroyed by high winds.
- Born: Harry Gibbs, Australian judge, 8th Chief Justice of Australia; in Sydney, Australia (d. 2005)

== February 8, 1917 (Thursday) ==
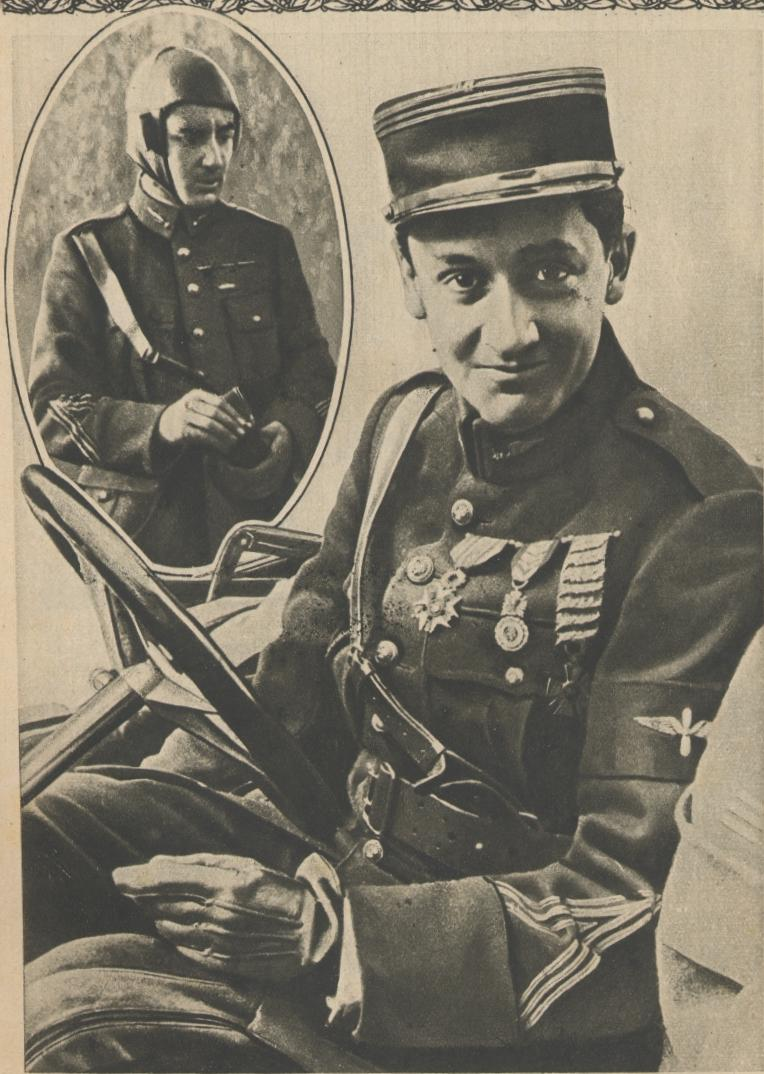
French flying ace Georges Guynemer

- Royal Navy destroyer HMS Ghurka struck a mine set by German submarine SM UC-47 and sank in the English Channel, killing all but five of her 79 crew.
- Royal Navy cruiser Liberty rammed and sunk German submarine SM UC-46 in the English Channel, killing all 26 crew on board.
- Royal Navy destroyer HMS Thrasher depth charged, shelled and sunk German submarine SM UC-39 in the North Sea, killing seven of her crew.
- French flying ace Georges Guynemer became the first Allied pilot to shoot down a German heavy bomber while flying a SPAD aircraft.
- The football club Gimnasia y Esgrima de Concepción del Uruguay was established in Concepción del Uruguay, Argentina.
- Died:
  - Anton Haus, 65, Austro-Hungarian naval officer, Grand Admiral of the Austro-Hungarian Navy from 1916 to 1917 (b. 1851)
  - Frank Allan, 67, Australian cricketer, bowler for the Australia national cricket team in 1878 to 1879 (b. 1849)
  - Harry Page Woodward, 58, British-born Australian geologist, discovered the rich iron ore deposits existing in Australia (b. 1858)
  - Arthur Rutledge, 73, Australian politician, member of the Legislative Assembly of Queensland from 1878 to 1904 (b. 1843)

== February 9, 1917 (Friday) ==
- German forces on the Western Front commenced Operation Alberich, an organized retreat and consolidation of army units scheduled over 35 days behind the Hindenburg Line. The planned defensive line was 40–45 kilometres (25–28 mi) shorter and could be defended more effectively, freeing up 13 fewer divisions for action in the Eastern Front.
- British cargo ship Mantola sank after being torpedoed the previous day in the Atlantic Ocean by German submarine U-81. Seven crew were killed while abandoning ship while the survivors were rescued by Royal Navy sloop HMS Laburnum.
- Chung Ling High School was established in George Town, Penang, Malaysia with 81 students and three staff. It now has 3,000 students enrolled.
- Born:
  - Joseph Conombo, Voltaic state leader, 3rd Prime Minister of Upper Volta (now Burkina Faso); in Kombissiri, French Upper Volta (present-day Burkina Faso) (d. 2008)
  - Peter Turnbull, Australian air force officer, commander of the No. 76 Squadron during World War II, recipient of the Distinguished Flying Cross; in Armidale, Australia (d. 1942, killed in action)

== February 10, 1917 (Saturday) ==
- The British Fifth Corps advanced half a mile during their operations in Ancre Valley to take back territory held by the Germans, coming in striking distance to Serr, France.
- The Imperial Japanese Navy established 1st and 2nd Special Squadrons to provide aerial protection of Allied shipping during World War I.
- The musical The Maid of the Mountains, by Harold Fraser-Simson and Frederick Lonsdale, premiered at the Daly's Theatre in London for an initial run of 1,352 performances.
- Born:
  - Ida d'Este, talian educator, politician and partisan (d. 1976)
  - Hossein Fatemi, Iranian politician, 13th Minister of Foreign Affairs during the Pahlavi dynasty; in Nain, Guarded Domains of Iran (present-day Iran) (d. 1954, executed)
  - Musine Kokalari, Albanian writer, author of As my old mother tells me and How life swayed; in Adana, Ottoman Empire (present-day Turkey) (d. 1983)
  - Allie Reynolds, American baseball player, pitcher for the Cleveland Indians and New York Yankees from 1942 to 1954, six time World Series champion; in Bethany, Oklahoma, United States (d. 1994)
- Died: John William Waterhouse, 68, English artist, known for Pre-Raphaelite style paintings with romantic themes including The Lady of Shalott and Ophelia (b. 1849)

== February 11, 1917 (Sunday) ==
- A German counterattack partially undid some of the gains made by the British during their operations in Ancre Valley.
- Princess Zewditu, Eldest Daughter of Emperor Menelik II (r.1889-1913) is crowned Empress Regnant of Ethiopia in St. George's Cathedral in Addis Ababa, following the deposition of her nephew Lij Iyasu on September 27, 1916. she becomes the first Empress Regnant of the Solomonic Dynasty and in Ethiopian History, since the Makeda, Queen Of Sheba.
- The National Hockey Association voted in favor of expelling the Toronto Blueshirts ice hockey club from the league due to the strained relationship with owner Eddie Livingstone, reducing the association's size to four teams.
- The German international school Deutsche Schule Bilbao was established in Bilbao, Spain.
- Born:
  - Bernard Destremau, French tennis player, winner of the 1938 French Open and contender in the U.S. Open and Wimbledon contests; in Paris, France (d. 2002)
  - Sidney Sheldon, American writer, best known as the creator of television hits The Patty Duke Show, I Dream of Jeannie, and Hart to Hart, recipient of the Academy Award for Best Original Screenplay for The Bachelor and the Bobby-Soxer; as Sidney Schechtel, in Chicago, United States (d. 2007)
- Died: Oswaldo Cruz, 44, Brazilian physician, leading researcher and promoter of vaccination programs against smallpox in Brazil, founder of the Oswaldo Cruz Foundation (b. 1872)

== February 12, 1917 (Monday) ==
- The comic strip The Gumps, created by Sidney Smith, was first published in the Chicago Tribune in a surprise replacement of Smith's previous comic strip Old Doc Yak.
- The Austro-Hungarian steamship Tihany, transporting coal from Bar to Kotor, ran aground around 19:00 local time between Cape Veslo and Cape Arza; while being towed to the Bay of Kotor, it sank around 21:20 near Mamula. All crew, including the captain Mato Tonković, survived.
- Born:
  - Dom DiMaggio, American baseball player, center fielder for the Boston Red Sox from 1940 to 1953; as Dominic Paul DiMaggio, in San Francisco, United States (d. 2009)
  - Odessa Grady Clay, American sports matriarch, mother of Muhammad Ali; as Odessa Lee O'Grady, in Hopkins County, Kentucky, United States (d. 1994)

== February 13, 1917 (Tuesday) ==
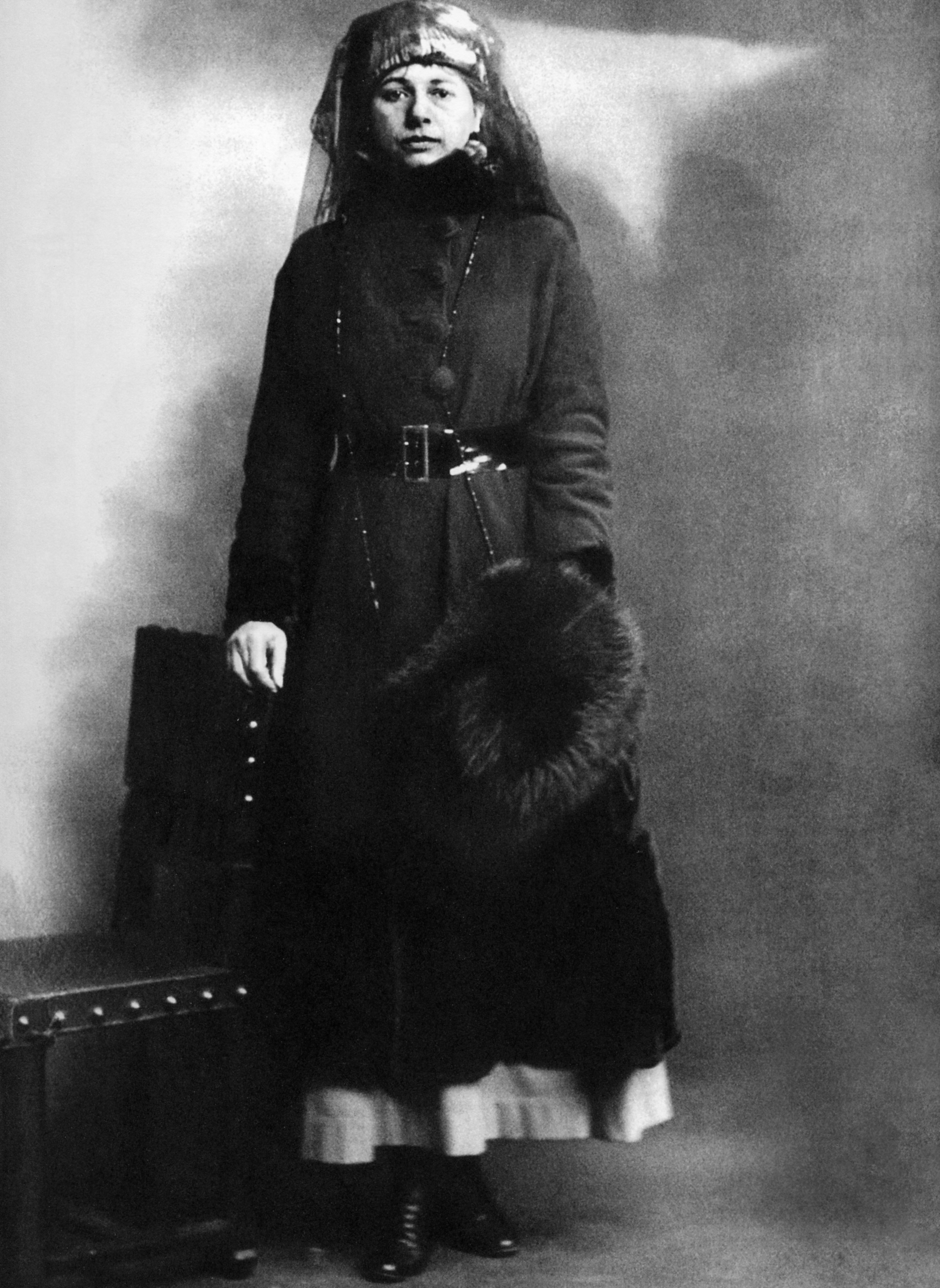
Mata Hari after being arrested in Paris.

- Two columns from the Egyptian Expeditionary Force left the Suez Canal in a campaign to push the remaining Ottoman forces off the Sinai Peninsula and into Palestine, starting with raids on Nekhl and Bir el Hassana.
- A German raid on British forces involved in operations in Ancre Valley, inflicting 382 British casualties. German casualties were reported as heavy with 210 prisoners taken.
- Mata Hari was arrested at Hotel Elysée Palace in Paris for spying.
- U.S. Marines aircraft pilot Francis Thomas Evans Sr. performed an aerobatic loop in a Curtiss floatplane off Pensacola, Florida, the first person to perform the feat in a seaplane.
- The London Biggin Hill Airport was founded as an air base for the Royal Flying Corps in Biggin Hill, Greater London, England.
- German psychiatrist Emil Kraepelin founded the German Institute for Psychiatric Research in Munich (now the Max Planck Institute of Psychiatry).

== February 14, 1917 (Wednesday) ==
- The British Fourth Army extended the front in Ancre Valley towards German-held Gueudecourt, France.
- German auxiliary cruiser Geier was scuttled in the Atlantic Ocean after running aground near Trinidad.
- The Associated British Machine Tool Makers was established in London.
- The first Interstate Bridge over the Columbia River between Vancouver, Washington, and Portland, Oregon, opened for traffic.
- Born:
  - Herbert A. Hauptman, American mathematician, recipient of the Nobel Prize in Chemistry for development of direct methods used to determine crystal structures; in New York City, United States (d. 2011)
  - Beqir Balluku, Albanian politician, assisted Albanian leader Enver Hoxha in the 1956 purge of the Albanian Communist Party, Minister of Defense from 1956 to 1974, in Tirana, Principality of Albania (present-day Albania) (d. 1975, executed)
  - Sue Sarafian Jehl, American army auxiliary officer, most decorated officer of the Women's Army Corps during World War II including the World War II Victory Medal; as Sue Sarafian, in Malden, Massachusetts, United States (d. 1997)

== February 15, 1917 (Thursday) ==
- Italian troopship Minas was sunk in the Ionian Sea by German submarine SM U-39 with the loss of 870 lives.
- Born: Meg Wyllie, American actress, best known for her multiple roles in the television soap opera General Hospital; as Margaret Gillespie Wyllie, in Honolulu, Territory of Hawaii, United States (present-day Hawaii, United States) (d. 2002)

== February 16, 1917 (Friday) ==
- The publishing house of Boni & Liveright was established in New York City by Horace Liveright with Albert Boni to introduce the "Modern Library" imprint.
- The Fairey Campania, first aircraft designed for seaplane operations, took flight.
- Died: Octave Mirbeau, 69, French writer, author of The Diary of a Chambermaid (b. 1848)

== February 17, 1917 (Saturday) ==
- The British Fifth Army launched assaults in Ancre Valley on the German-held French villages of Miraumont, Thilloys, and Irless, and strategic point Hill 130.
- British forces captured Nekhl from the Ottomans in the Sinai Peninsula.
- French troopship Athos was sunk in the Mediterranean Sea by German submarine SM U-65 with the loss of 754 lives.
- Royal Navy armed merchant ship HMS Farnborough was torpedoed and damaged in the Atlantic Ocean south of Ireland by German submarine SM U-83. However, she was able to return fire and succeeded in sinking the U-boat, killing 35 of her crew and capturing two survivors. She was towed and beached at Berehaven, Ireland where she was repaired and returned to service.
- The Nationalist Party of Australia was formed with the merger of the Commonwealth Liberal Party and the National Labor Party, with Billy Hughes as party leader. The new party allowed Hughes to return to head the Australian Government after winning a huge victory during the federal election held in May.
- The daily newspaper La Razón released its first edition in La Paz, Bolivia.
- Born:
  - Whang-od, Filipino tattoo artist, considered the last living mambabatok artist of Buscalan Kalinga in the Philippines; as Whang-od Oggay, in Tinglayan, Philippine Islands (present-day Philippines)
  - Joseph W. Dailey, American marine officer, 5th Sergeant Major of the Marine Corps, recipient of the Silver Star for actions during the Battle of Okinawa, and the Bronze Star Medal and Navy Cross for actions during the Korean War; in Black Mountain, Arkansas, United States (d. 2007)
- Died: Carolus-Duran, 79, French painter, director of the French Academy in Rome from 1905 to 1913 (b. 1837)

== February 18, 1917 (Sunday) ==
- German units around Miraumont were forced to retreat to the Hindenburg Line ahead of schedule due to the British advance in Ancre Valley, but held Hill 130 after inflicting 2,207 casualties.
- British forces captured Bir el Hassana from the Ottomans in the Sinai Peninsula.
- British passenger ship Berrima was damaged either by striking a mine or being torpedoed in the English Channel, with the loss of four lives. Her crew were rescued by Royal Navy destroyer HMS Forester and the ship was towed to England where she was repaired and returned to service.
- The Kennesaw Mountain National Battlefield Site was established near Kennesaw, Georgia. It was established as a national battlefield park in 1935.
- Born:
  - Tuulikki Pietilä, American-born Finnish artist, best known for her graphics artwork, including collaborations with her life partner Tove Jansson on the popular children's books series Moomins; as Ida Helmi Tuulikki Pietilä, in Seattle, United States (d. 2009)
  - John Keane, Irish Gaelic football player, centre-back for the Waterford and Mount Sion clubs from 1934 to 1955; in Waterford, Ireland (d. 1975)
  - Oliver F. Atkins, American photographer, personal photographer for U.S. President Richard Nixon; in Boston, United States (d. 1977)
- Died: Ezequiel Cabeza De Baca, 52, American politician, 2nd Governor of New Mexico, first Hispanic to serve as a state governor (b. 1864)

== February 19, 1917 (Monday) ==
- Royal Navy armed merchant ship Lady Olive sank German submarine SM UC-18 in the English Channel with the loss of all 28 crew.
- Zimmermann Telegram – British intelligence officer William Reginald Hall, chief of Room 40 for the Admiralty, shared a decoded German telegram with Edward Bell, secretary of the United States Embassy in the United Kingdom, that revealed a military alliance proposal between Mexico and Germany, including support to conquer the states of Texas, New Mexico, and Arizona lost in the Mexican–American War.
- Born: Carson McCullers, American writer, author of The Heart Is a Lonely Hunter and the drama The Member of the Wedding; as Lula Carson Smith, in Columbus, Georgia, United States (d. 1967)
- Died: Frederick Funston, 51, American army officer, recipient of the Medal of Honor for action during the Philippine–American War (b. 1865)

== February 20, 1917 (Tuesday) ==
- Zimmermann Telegram – A copy of the telegram was sent to Walter Hines Page, American ambassador to the United Kingdom.
- The Luftstreitkräfte established air squadron Jagdstaffel 34.
- The Broadway musical Oh, Boy!, with music by Jerome Kern and lyrics by Guy Bolton and P. G. Wodehouse, premiered at the Princess Theatre in New York City and ran for 463 performances.
- Born:
  - Manny Farber, American film critic, American advocate of the auteur theory and credited for coining the term underground film; as Emanuel Farber, in Douglas, Arizona, United States (d. 2008)
  - Frederick Page, British aerospace engineer, designer of the English Electric Lightning and BAC TSR-2 military aircraft; in Wimbledon, London, England (d. 2005)

== February 21, 1917 (Wednesday) ==
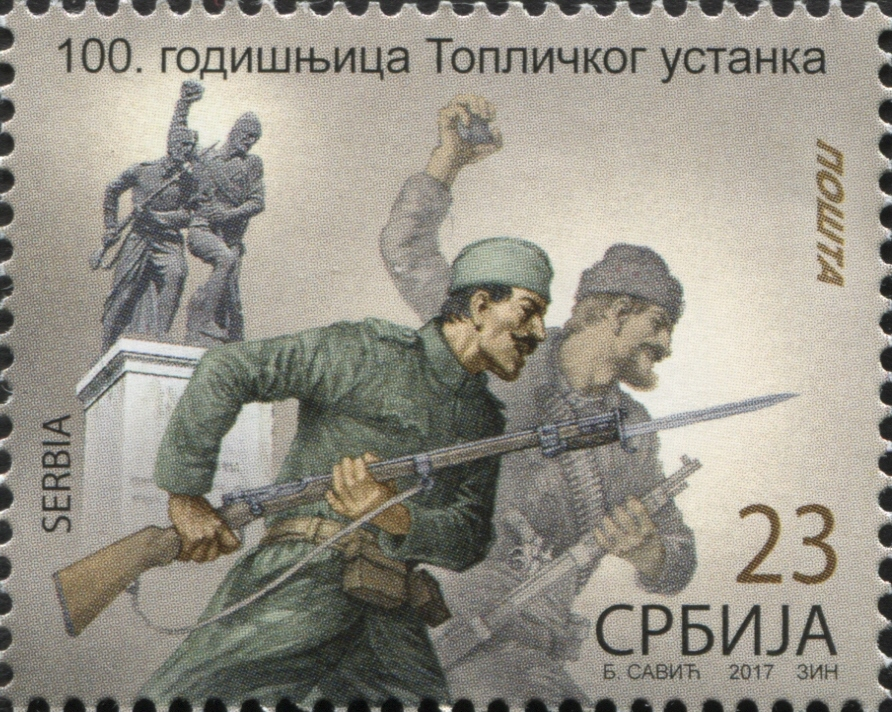
Serbian postage stamp commemorating the centennial of the Toplica Uprising.

- Toplica Uprising – Serbian rebel forces known as the Chetniks began an organized rebellion against the Central Powers in occupied Serbia.
- British troopship SS Mendi was accidentally rammed and sunk by cargo ship Darro off the Isle of Wight, killing 646, including 616 soldiers with the South African Native Labour Corps and 30 crew.
- A Belgian royal decree established the Commemorative Medal for military service in Africa during World War I.
- Born:
  - Lucille Bremer, American actress and dancer, known for roles in Meet Me in St. Louis, Ziegfeld Follies and Till the Clouds Roll By; in Amsterdam, New York, United States (d. 1996)
  - Otto Kittel, German air force officer, commander of Jagdgeschwader 54 for the Luftwaffe during World War II, credited with 267 aerial victories making him the fourth highest-scoring ace, recipient of the Knight's Cross of the Iron Cross; in Kronsdorf, German Empire (present-day Krasov, Czech Republic) (d. 1945, killed in action)

== February 22, 1917 (Thursday) ==
- The Federal Interpleader Act was approved by the United States Congress.
- Norwegian cargo ship Ajax was sunk in the English Channel by German submarine SM UC-17, with her crew surviving.
- Carter County, Montana, and Wheatland County, Montana, were established. Carter has its county seat in Ekalaka, Montana, while Wheatland has its county seat in Harlowton, Montana.
- Born:
  - Tom Braden, American journalist, co-host of the CNN series Crossfire and his column that inspired the television sitcom Eight Is Enough; as Thomas Wardell Braden, in Greene, Iowa, United States (d. 2009)
  - Reed Crandall, American comic book artist, best known for his work for EC Comics and DC Comics with the superhero Blackhawk; in Winslow, Indiana, United States (d. 1982)
  - Jocelyn Herbert, British stage designer, known for her collaborations with George Devine and Laurence Olivier; in London, England (d. 2003)

== February 23, 1917 (Friday) ==
- Second Battle of Kut – A British Indian force of 50,000 men under command of Lieutenant-General Stanley Maude recaptured the Persian city of Kut in Mesopotamia (now Iraq), capturing most of 17,000 Ottoman troops stationed there except for 2,500 that retreated with Ottoman commander Kâzım Karabekir.
- German submarine SM UC-32 accidentally struck a mine she was laying off the coast of England, with the loss of 19 of her 22 crew.
- The Royal Flying Corps No. 100 Squadron, the first British night fighter squadron, was formed.
- The city of Brea, California, was incorporated.
- Born: Maxie Berger, Canadian boxer, flyweight silver medalist at the 1934 British Empire Games; in Montreal, Canada (d. 2000)

== February 24, 1917 (Saturday) ==
- Zimmermann Telegram – Walter Hines Page, U.S. ambassador to the United Kingdom, met with Foreign Secretary Arthur Balfour where he was shown the original intercepted telegram, in which Germany offered to support the Mexican reoccupation of the American Southwest if the country declared war on the United States.
- The P. G. Wodehouse novel Piccadilly Jim was first published by Dodd, Mead & Co. in the United States but over a year later by Herbert Jenkins Ltd in the United Kingdom.
- Born:
  - Leslie Douglas Jackson, Australian air force officer, commander of the No. 75 Squadron during World War II, recipient of the Distinguished Flying Cross; in Brisbane, Australia (d. 1980)
  - Peter Stanley James, British air force officer, captain of the renowned Handley Page Halifax bomber during World War II, recipient of the Distinguished Flying Cross; in Wellingborough, England (d. 1999)
- Died:
  - Franklin Benjamin Sanborn, 85, American journalist, proponent of the transcendentalism movement in the United States, member of the Secret Six that funded abolitionist John Brown (b. 1831)
  - Loke Yew, 71, Malaysian business leader, key business figure of Kuala Lumpur and co-founder of the Victoria Institution (b. 1845)

== February 25, 1917 (Sunday) ==
- The Italian Socialist Party began to fracture during a national convention in Rome between reformists and hard-liners, despite the approval of an agenda proposed by Costantino Lazzari.
- Royal Navy troopship Laconia was torpedoed and sunk in the Atlantic Ocean by German submarine SM U-50 with the loss of 12 lives.
- The 74th Division of the Egyptian Expeditionary Force was established.
- Born:
  - Anthony Burgess, English writer, author of A Clockwork Orange; as John Burgess Wilson, in Manchester, England (d. 1993)
  - Brenda Joyce, American actress, seventh actor to play Jane in the Tarzan film series; as Betty Graftina Leabo, in Excelsior Springs, Missouri, United States (d. 2009)

== February 26, 1917 (Monday) ==
- U.S. Marines aircraft pilot Alfred A. Cunningham received orders to establish an aviation arm of the Corps at the Philadelphia Naval Shipyard in anticipation the United States would be entering World War I.
- Mount McKinley National Park was established in Interior Alaska (it was renamed Denali National Park and Preserve in 1980).
- Valley County, Idaho, was established with its county seat in Cascade, Idaho.
- The Original Dixieland Jass Band recorded the first jazz single "Livery Stable Blues", and released a new record with the single accompanied with the song "Dixieland Jass Band One-Step".
- Broadway actress Marjorie Rambeau made her debut in the drama The Greater Woman, directed by Frank Powell. The film is now considered lost.
- Died:
  - George Johnson Clarke, 59, Canadian politician, 15th Premier of New Brunswick (b. 1857)
  - Joseph Jules Dejerine, 67, French neurologist, pioneer in brain functionality including the neurological causes of dyslexia (b. 1849)

== February 27, 1917 (Tuesday) ==
- A British force pursuing retreating Ottoman forces from Kut in Mesopotamia halted their advance at the village of Aziziyeh (now in Iran). After resupplying over three days, the force continued on to Baghdad.
- Toplica Uprising – Serbian Chetniks liberated Kuršumlija, Serbia.
- The Milwaukee Railroad completed the electrification of its 440 miles (710 km) line from Harlowton, Montana, to Avery, Idaho.
- Norwegian football club Sandefjord was established in Sandefjord, Norway.
- Born:
  - John Connally, American politician, 39th Governor of Texas, 61st United States Secretary of the Treasury; in Floresville, Texas, United States (d. 1993)
  - Laine Mesikäpp, Estonian actress and singer, lifelong promoter and archivist of Estonian folk music; in Adila, Governorate of Estonia, Russian Empire (present-day Estonia) (d. 2012)
  - Charles Warren Callister, American architect, known for his community designs including Rossmoor, Walnut Creek, California; in Rochester, New York, United States (d. 2008)
- Died: John Wallace Crawford, 69, American pioneer and writer, known for his scouting mission during the Battle of Slim Buttes and his collaborations with Buffalo Bill (b. 1847)

== February 28, 1917 (Wednesday) ==
- Zimmermann Telegram – The U.S. government released the English text of the telegram outlining German plans to start a war between Mexico and the United States to the public.
- French minelayer Cassini struck a mine and sank in the Strait of Bonifacio with the loss of 88 of her crew.
- The Corpo Aeronautico Militare (Military Aviation Corps) of the Italian Army established air squadrons 80a and 81a Squadriglia to support ground troops in the ongoing Battles of the Isonzo.
- The Union Bank & Trust Company was established in Lincoln, Nebraska, under the name Farmers State Bank before changing to its present name in 1935.
- De Baca County, New Mexico, was incorporated, with its county seat in Fort Sumner, New Mexico.
- Payette County, Idaho, was established using portions of Canyon County, Idaho, with its county seat in Payette, Idaho.
- Born: Ernesto Alonso, Mexican television director and producer, best known for his Telenovela works including Barrera de amor; in Aguascalientes, Mexico (d. 2007)
