= Sue Sarafian Jehl =

American Women's Auxiliary Army Corps member

WAC Sue (Sarafian) Jehl
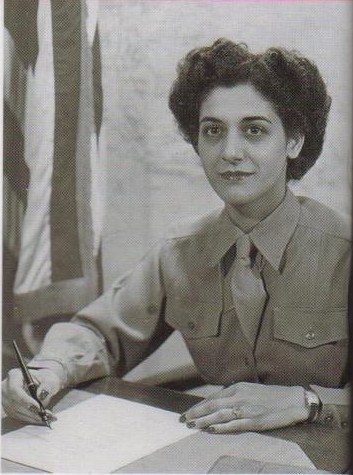
- Born: February 14, 1917; Malden, Massachusetts
- Died: April 13, 1997 (aged 80); Maitland, Florida
- Burial place: Arlington National Cemetery; 38°52′37″N 77°04′15″W
- Spouse: Ronald Jehl
- Military career
- Allegiance: United States
- Branch: United States Army Corps
- Service years: August, 1942 – April, 1947
- Rank: Second Lieutenant
- Conflicts: World War II: Northern France-Normandy; Rhineland
- Awards: Good Conduct Medal; Presidential Unit Citation; WAC Service Medal; American Campaign Medal; European Campaign Medal; World War II Victory Medal

Sue Jehl (née Sue Sarafian) (February 14, 1917 – April 13, 1997) was one of the best known Women's Auxiliary Army Corps (WAAC) personnel to serve the United States during World War II. She was one of the three personal secretaries to General Dwight David Eisenhower, serving him from January 1943 to April 1947.

She was one of the first women from the Detroit area to enlist in the WAAC (established on May 14, 1942). Sarafian Jehl enlisted for the corps in July 1942. The WAAC provided secretaries, switchboard operators and cooks for the army.

== Life ==
Of Armenian descent, Sue Sarafian was born in Malden, Massachusetts, February 14, 1917. Her parents Shmavon Sarafian, a grocer, and Makroohi Sharistanian, a housewife, were born in Keghi, Kharpert (today Harput) in the Ottoman Empire. She was the eldest of five daughters: Sue, Louise, Beatrice, Marioan, and Patricia. She attended public schools in Detroit, Michigan, graduated from Highland Park High School in 1934 and with distinction from The Business Institute. She was a charter member of the Armenian Youth Federation, Detroit Chapter.

Sarafian began first began working with the federal government. She held secretarial posts in the Internal Revenue Service and the Census Bureau for one year. She was then employed as a private secretary and head cashier by the American National Insurance Company of Galveston, Texas, for six years.

=== Active service ===
Sarafian decided she should join the war effort because she was the oldest of five girls and that there were no boys in the family. She participated in training with the Women's Auxiliary Army Corps (WAAC) on September 1, 1942, with Company 2, 3rd Regiment at Fort Des Moines and remained there for the duration of basic training. During her time at Fort Des Moines she was assigned to duties at a military conference in Peoria, Illinois. On November 2, 1942, Sarafian went from Fort Des Moines to Daytona Beach, Florida, where she and 400 other cadets took part in the opening of the second WAAC Training Center.

On December 30, 1942, Jehl was sent to Camp Kilmer, New Jersey, and on January 14, 1943, boarded a ship that arrived in North Africa.

Jehl arrived in North Africa near the village of El Briar which was General Eisenhower's European Theater of Operations. Upon arrival, her first couple of months was marked by a life-threatening incident while she was in a truck with other WAACs:

We were coming back from somewhere, I didn't know where. It was night and completely dark. A British truck with even its dim lights off hit the side our truck and knocked the cab part right off. One of the girls had a broken nose, and I suffered a fractured pelvis and was hospitalized for six months.

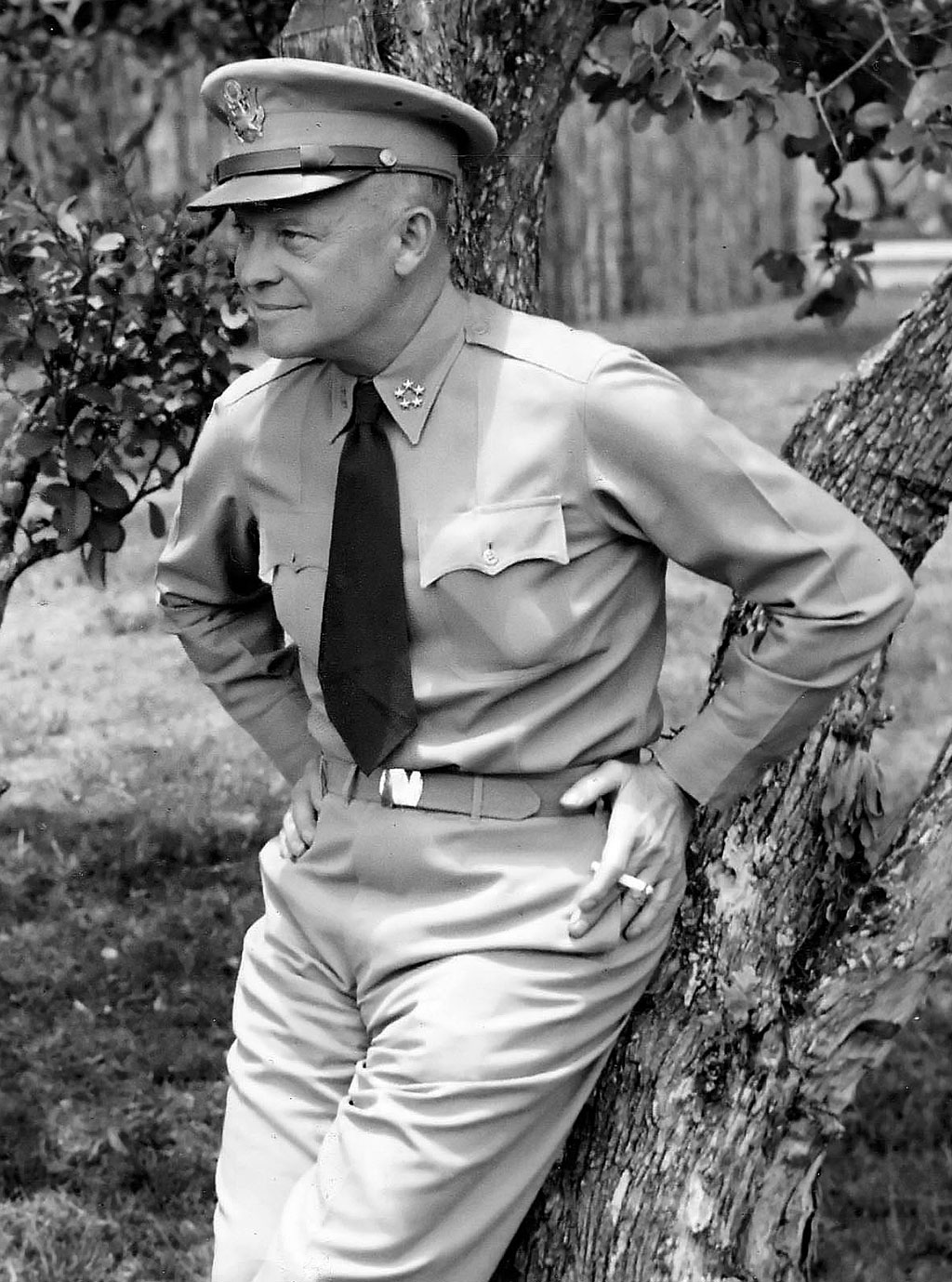
Sue Sarafian Jehl was one of three personal secretaries of Dwight D. Eisenhower

Sarafian was assigned to Inspector General Hill's office where she performed secretarial duties. She was then summoned for an interview to become General Eisenhower's secretary. After much reluctance, Sarafian agreed to an interview and succeeded in obtaining the position. During this period, word was received that the WAACs would now become the Women's Army Corps (WAC) and become a component of the army. She recalled that Eisenhower believed that women would make efficient officers and that the WAC had:

...paved the way for women in the military. We were the first. Today they have army officers, marines, even fighter pilots. A lot of people doubted that women could do the job, but the General (Eisenhower) was confident. He pushed for it. He said in his book that after we were proven, many of those who doubted us were calling WACs to work with.

After the Italians were defeated in late 1943, Eisenhower was appointed Supreme Allied Commander of Europe and went to London to plan the invasion of Europe. In January 1944, Sarafian was sent to London and accompanied Eisenhower later to France and Germany as the war progressed. Having spent much time with Eisenhower, Sarafian described his personality as follows:

He was not a gentle person. By all means no. He was a very strict disciplinarian and even after working for him for almost five years, we were all still afraid of him. I mean, you couldn't go up and say, 'Hi, how are you, good morning' or anything. You never talked to him unless he talked to you first. He never talked about anything personal, ever. He could also get ruffled very easily. He was a perfectionist.

During her career as a secretary, she met many important figures such as George S. Patton, Omar Bradley and George Marshall.

Sarafian also recalled how "distressed" Eisenhower was before the invasion of Normandy in 1944. She later accompanied Eisenhower throughout the invasion of Europe, and the transfer of Supreme Headquarters Allied Expeditionary Force (SHAEF) to France and then Germany until the conclusion of the war in Europe in June 1945.

After returning from World War II, Eisenhower became chief of staff and Sarafian was the only WAC left with him. During this period, Sarafian would take up the responsibility of writing Eisenhower's memoirs, Crusade in Europe. She received dictations of what to write from Eisenhower who had a habit of dictating passages aloud. On June 18, 1946, Sarafian was appointed 2nd Lieutenant. In early August 1946, Eisenhower visited Brazil, Panama and Mexico. Sarafian was scheduled to be a member of the expedition, but was forced to remain behind in Washington as she became ill. However, she was honored in absentia and later on August 21 in Washington, Colonel James Stack, Eisenhower's aide, awarded her the Brazilian Medal of War on behalf of the government of Brazil.

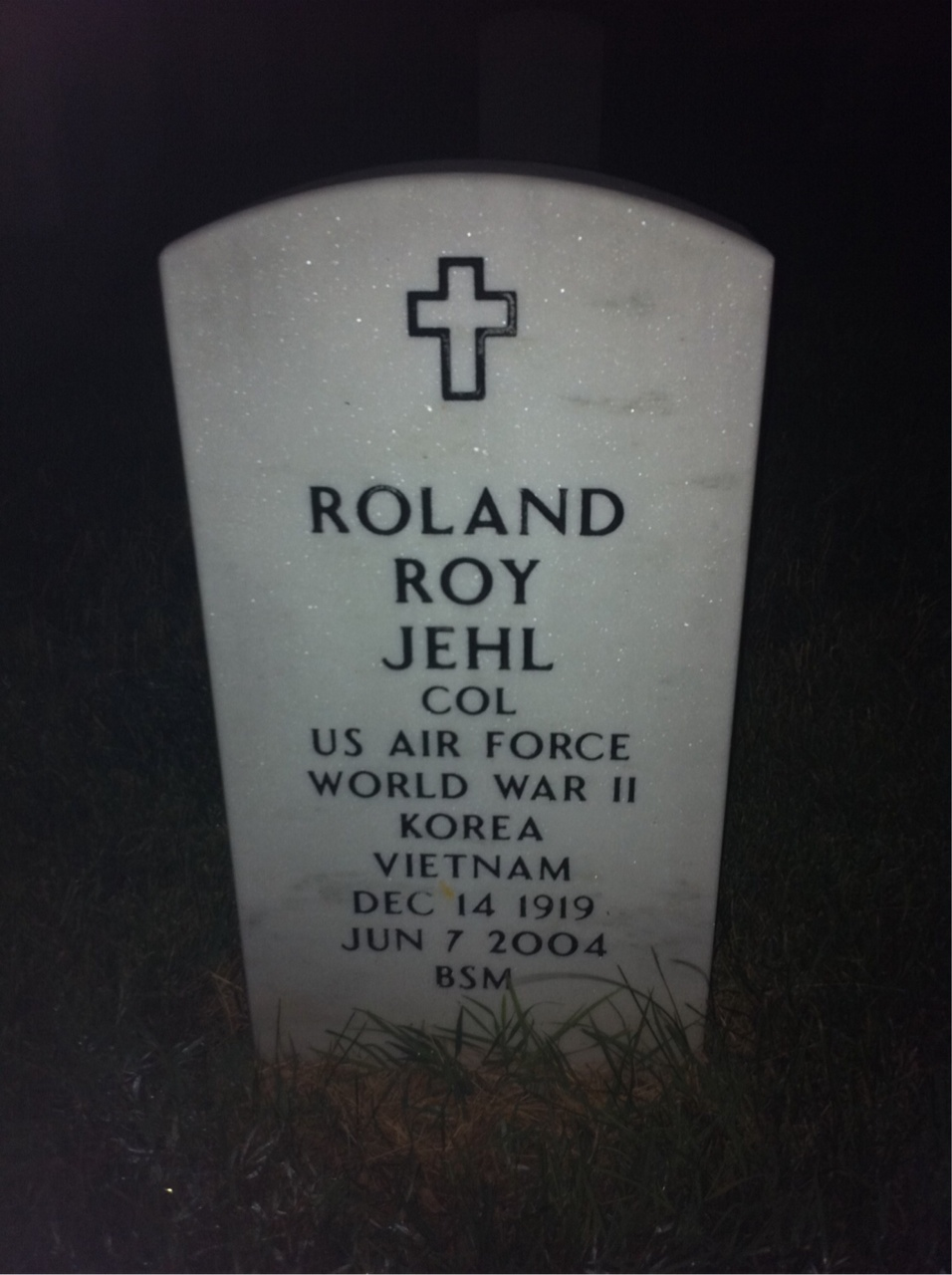
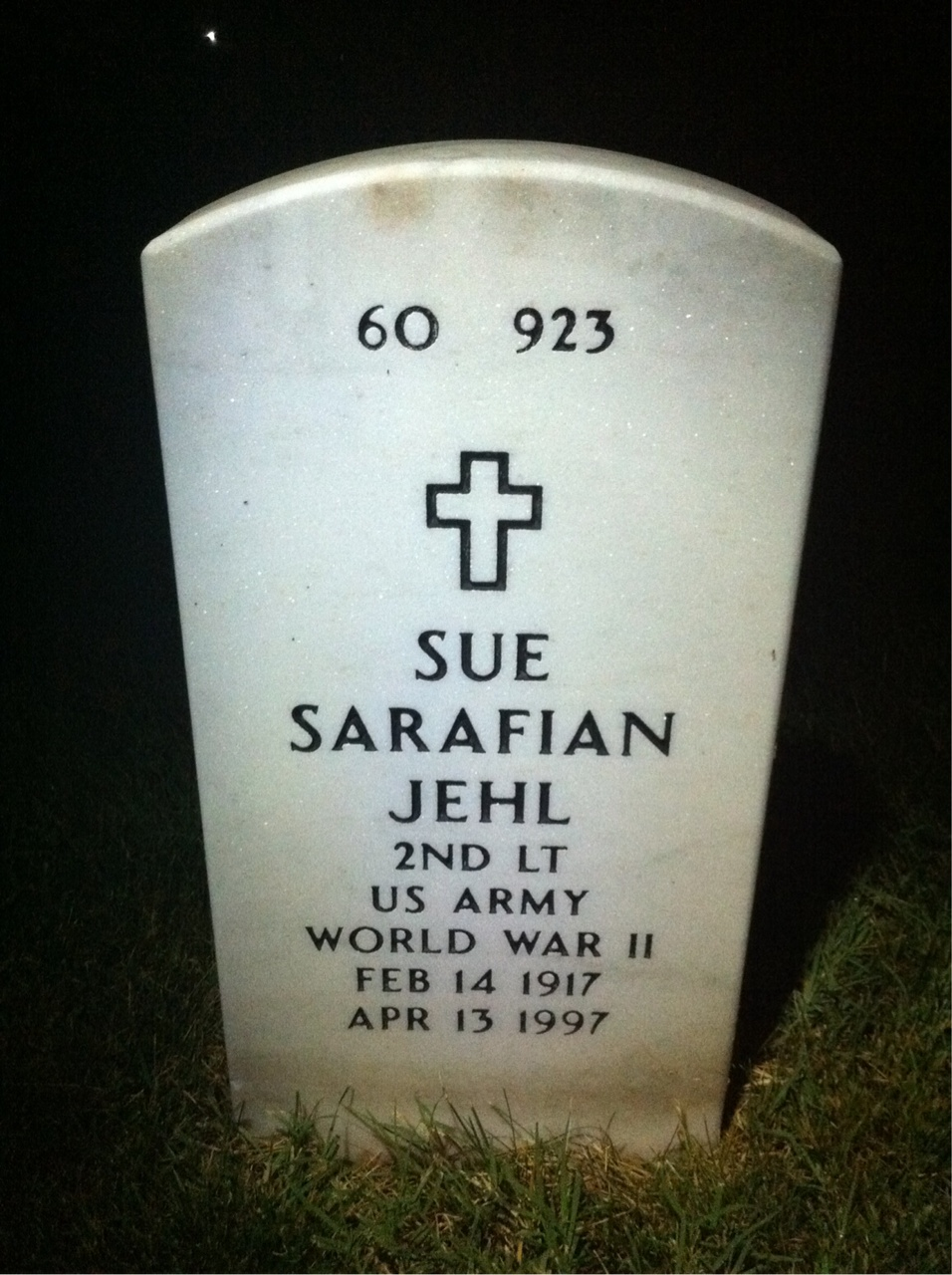
Grave at Arlington National Cemetery

In 1947, while still working as a secretary for Eisenhower, she married Roland Roy Jehl who was formerly a pilot for Lieutenant General Walter Bedell Smith. On April 24, 1947, her career in the army ended.

=== Later life ===
Sue Sarafian Jehl had three children, Roland R. Jr., Laurance A. and Patricia Joy Lamb; and four grandchildren, Michael Lamb, Jeffrey Lamb, Evan Jehl and Bailey Jehl.

In 1994, during 50th anniversary celebrations of the Normandy invasion, she recounted Eisenhower's decision-making process on ABC's Good Morning America.

Sue Sarafian Jehl died from cancer on April 13, 1997, in her home in Maitland, Florida. She was cremated and her ashes are interred at Arlington National Cemetery.

== Military decorations ==
Jehl's military decorations include:

1st row	Army Good Conduct Medal		Women's Army Corps Service Medal
2nd row	American Campaign Medal	European-African-Middle Eastern Campaign Medal w/ 2 bronze service stars	World War II Victory Medal
Unit Award	Army Presidential Unit Citation		
