= Deutsche Schule Bilbao =

German international school in Bilbao, Spain

Coordinates: 43.2599°N 2.9101°W

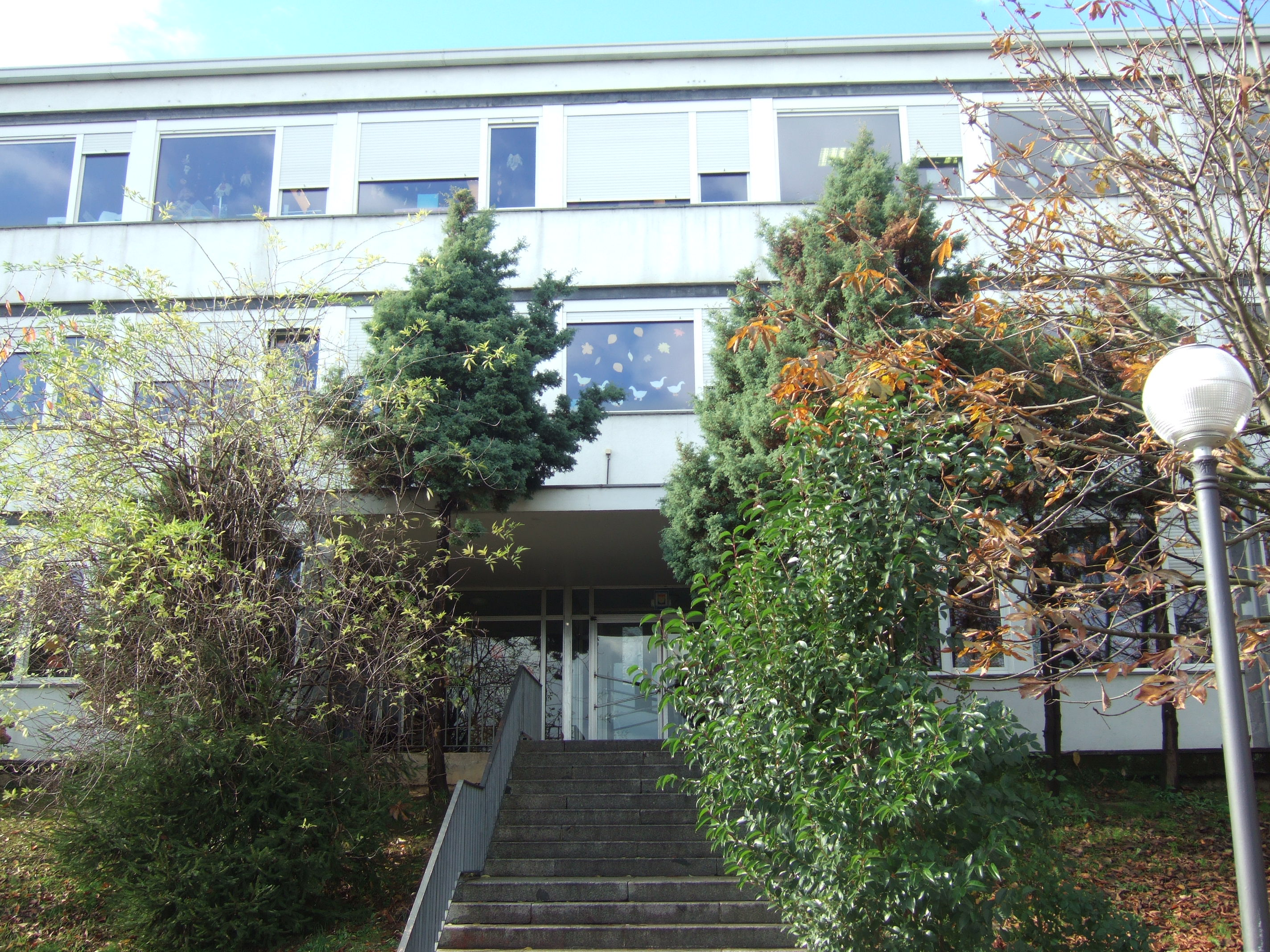
Deutsche Schule Bilbao

Deutsche Schule Bilbao (Spanish: Colegio Alemán Bilbao) is a German international school in Bilbao, Spain. It serves Kindergarten, Grundschule/Primaria, Sekundarstufe/Secundaria, and Oberstufe/Bachillerato.

It was previously known as Deutsche Schule San Bonifacio.

== History ==
The school began operations in a facility on 11 February 1917. At the time it had 17 students. It hired its first Spanish national teacher in 1923. The school had 50 students by 1924, and on 27 April of that year it moved into a building in Deusto. The school's first abitur was held in June 1940. The school was closed temporarily on 5 August 1945 as Germany surrendered in World War II, and until 1951 students received instruction in the teachers' private apartments.

In 1951, the school moved to Alameda de Recalde No. 4. In 1956, it rented the third floor of Alameda de Mazarredo, 63 for temporary space. In 1958, the school bought land in Begoña, and its current campus opened in 1961.
