= Ellerman Lines =

UK based shipping company

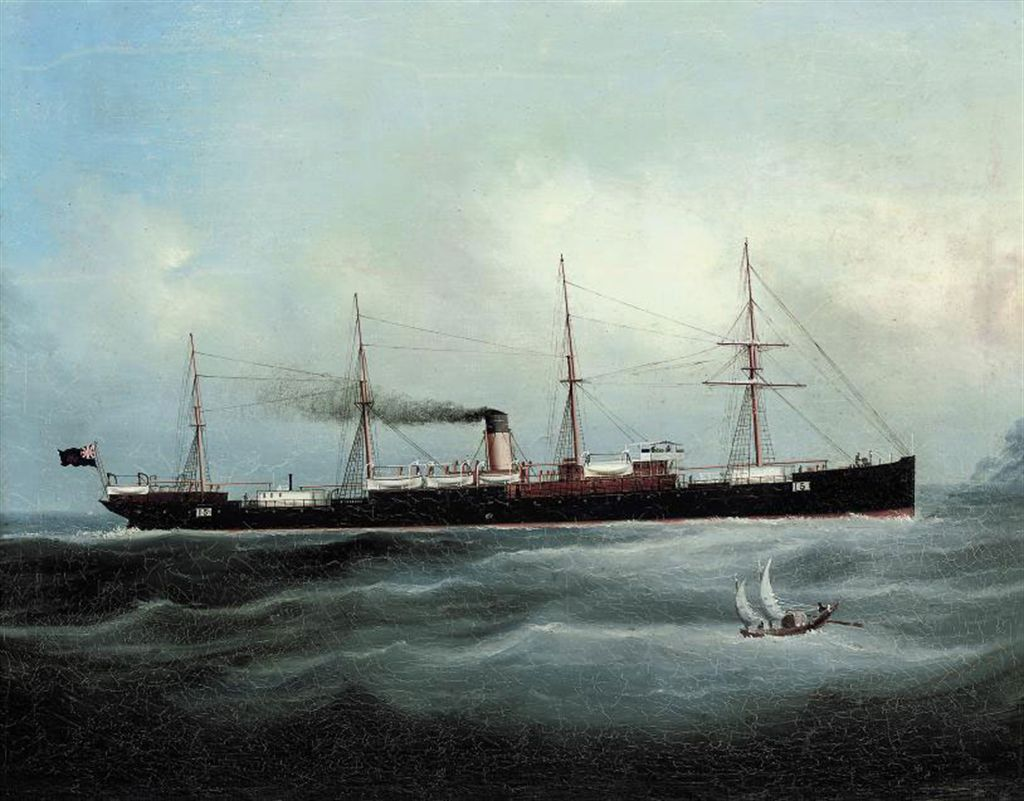
- Ellerman Lines' four-masted sail-steamer barquentine City of Cambridge, launched in 1870
- Industry: water transport
- Founded: 1892; 134 years ago in Liverpool, England
- Founder: John Ellerman; Christopher Furness; Henry O'Hagan
- Defunct: 2004
- Fate: Sold and absorbed
- Headquarters: Liverpool and Glasgow, United Kingdom

Ellerman Lines was a UK cargo and passenger shipping company that operated from the late nineteenth century and into the twentieth century. It was founded in the late 19th century, and continued to expand by acquiring smaller shipping lines until it became one of the largest shipping firms in the world. Setbacks occurred through heavy losses to its merchant fleet in the First and Second World Wars but were overcome in each case.

The company suffered from competition and modernising trends in the shipping industry that occurred in the second half of the 20th century. Its shipping assets were subsequently sold off to larger companies until the name was dropped in 2004, and Ellerman finally ceased its long association with shipping. However, as of 2021, the Ellerman name was revived in the form of Ellerman City Liners, to provide a new container shipping service between the UK and China.

== History ==
=== Predecessors and early years ===
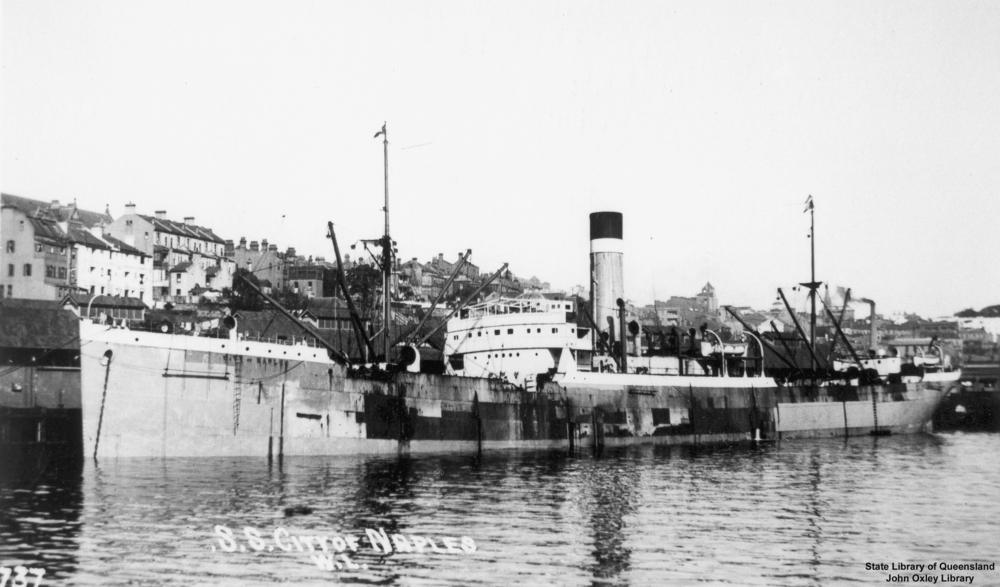
Hall Line's City of Naples, launched in 1908

The company was incorporated in 1892, by the businessmen John Ellerman, Christopher Furness and Henry O'Hagan, who bought the assets of the Liverpool based shipping firm Frederick Leyland and Co Ltd. The company started with an initial capital of £800,000 to buy the fleet of 22 vessels from the executors of Frederick Leyland, the former head of Frederick Leyland and Co. Ellerman was initially the managing director, and Furness the chairman, but Ellerman had taken on the role of chairman himself by 1893.

The company expanded in 1900 by acquiring 20 ships from the West India and Pacific Steamship Company. The firm was then reorganised as Frederick Leyland (1900), and operated with a capital of £2,800,000. In 1901 the company was bought by J. P. Morgan's International Marine Mercantile Company, but Ellerman remained as chairman, and the owner of 20 ships. He later acquired the Papayanni Steamship Company and eight of its ships. He used these assets to form the London, Liverpool and Ocean Shipping Company, based at Moorgate in London.

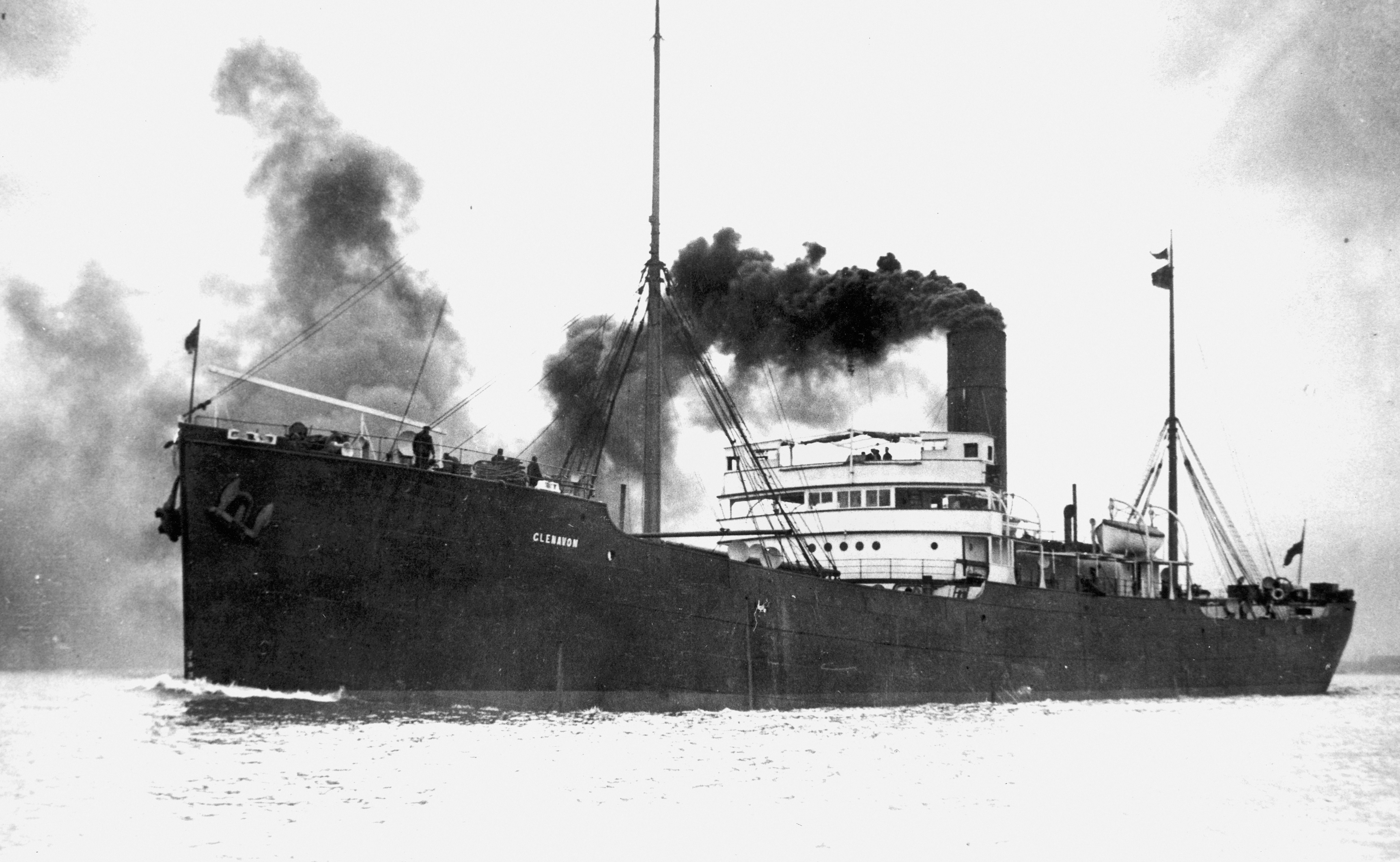
Branksome Hall, launched in 1904. The photo shows it between 1906 and 1911, when it was with Glen Line and called Glenavon.

The London, Liverpool and Ocean Shipping Company then went on to buy 50 per cent of George Smith and Sons' City Line, Glasgow, and 50 per cent of the Hall Line Ltd in 1903. Its capital was further increased, and the name was changed to Ellerman Lines. The company had its head offices in Liverpool and Glasgow, with a subsidiary office in London. Further acquisitions followed. In 1904–05 the company bought McGregor, Gow and Co of Liverpool, which was known as Glen Line. In 1908 the company bought the financially troubled Bucknall Steamship Lines who operated on numerous routes between the United Kingdom, South Africa, the near East and North America, which in 1914 was renamed Ellerman & Bucknall Steamship Co.

The Ellerman group of companies now occupied a dominating position in the Mediterranean and Near East. By 1914, the Ellerman group controlled four subsidiary companies: Ellerman City Line; Ellerman and Bucknall Steamship Company; Ellerman and Papayanni Lines; and Hall Line (though the City and Hall line were often referred to as one — Ellerman City & Hall Lines).

=== Wartime service and purchase of Wilson Line ===
Ellerman's position as a major shipping firm meant that a large portion of its fleet was requisitioned by the British Government on the outbreak of the First World War, for use as troop ships, munitions carriers, or for conversion into armed merchant cruisers to augment the Royal Navy. Ellerman continued to operate a skeletal service with its remaining ships, and in 1916 Ellerman personally bought Wilson Line of Hull, bringing 67 short-sea vessels into service with the company.

The Wilson operation was renamed Ellerman's Wilson Line and traded as a separate entity with its own distinctive livery of red funnel with a black top and most of the vessels had dark green hulls. This was a complete contrast to the buff funnels with a black top and white dividing line used by the grey hulled Ellerman Lines' vessels.

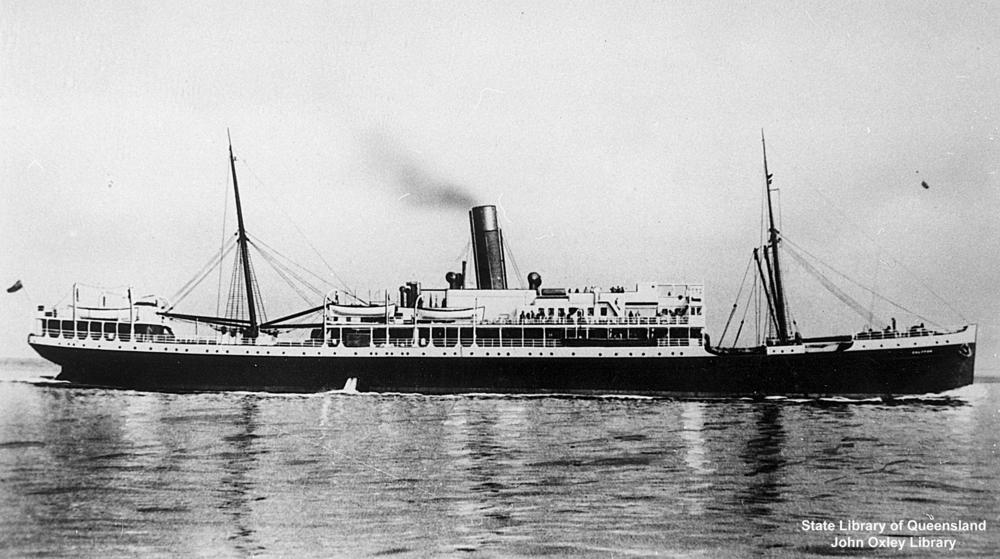
Calypso, launched in 1897. Ellerman Wilson Lines acquired her in 1920 as World War I reparations.

"Heavy losses were suffered by the various companies controlled by Sir John Ellerman. In all, 103 ocean vessels, with a total cargo capacity of 600,000 to 750,000 tons, were destroyed. These included the liner City of Athens mined off Cape Town in Aug. 1917. City of Winchester (1914) was the first merchant vessel to be destroyed in the war, being captured by the German cruiser Königsberg, while homeward bound from India with a very valuable cargo of produce. Another liner belonging to the Ellerman fleets was mined far from Europe. The City of Exeter, a fine passenger ship, struck a mine in the Indian Ocean, about 400 m. from Bombay. Number 1 hold filled at once, and the master gave orders for the passengers and crew to leave the ship. Then the master and chief engineer returned and, at grave risk, made a thorough examination of the ship. They decided that, with the exercise of the greatest care, the crippled vessel could reach Bombay under her own steam. The passengers reembarked and the vessel safely arrived in port."

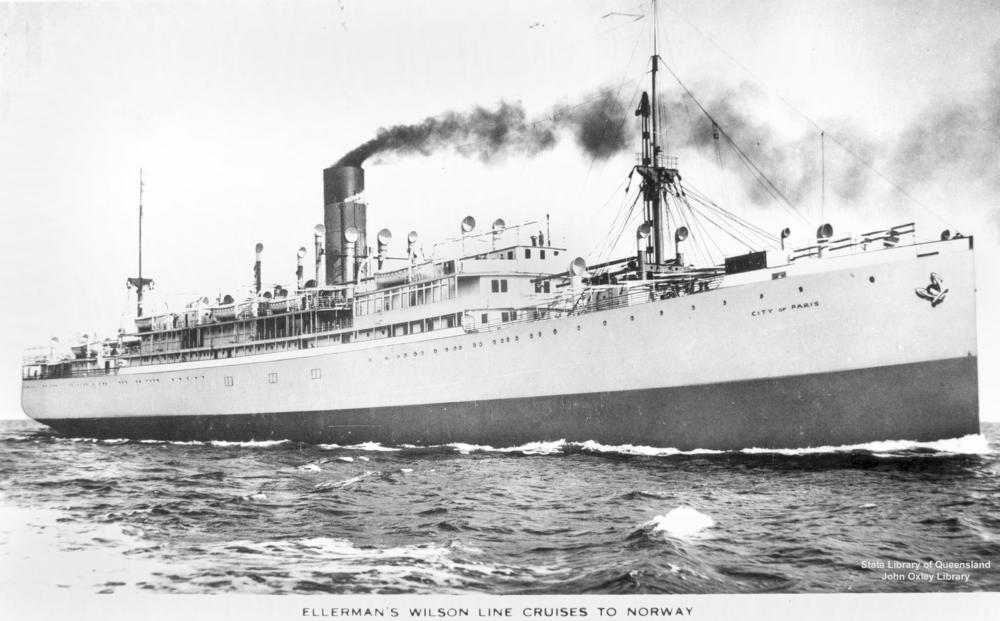
Ellerman Wilson Lines' City of Paris, launched in 1922

Ellerman Lines sought to restore a pre-war level of service after the end of the war. This involved obtaining several German liners as well as placing orders for new ships. Before long the old networks of passenger and cargo services had been restored.

John Ellerman died a baronet with a fortune of £37 million in 1933.

The death of the founder, an individualist, left a considerable gap. The younger Sir John Ellerman was just 24 years old and was astute enough to accept that. He would remain the largest share holder by far and would maintain a controlling presence over the company's direction until his own demise. However his passions lay elsewhere with interests in music, stage and what he would excel at the most and become famous for, the study of rodents.

As a result, the Deputy Chairman Sir Miles Walker Mattinson KC was invited to become Chairman to maintain continuity. A role he was suited to as an eminent lawyer specializing in company law, and had been a close confident and associate to the late Ellerman, in many of the acquisitions and commercial deals that had grown the company.

By 1939 and the outbreak of the Second World War the fleet had been successfully rebuilt and expanded, to the extent that the Ellerman groups owned a total 105 ships with a combined capacity of 920,000 tons. This made Ellerman's one of the biggest fleets in the World. Its ships were in four classes: mixed cargo and passenger ships; cargo ships with limited passenger accommodation; pure cargo ships; and short sea traders for service in the Mediterranean. Many of these ships were subsequently requisitioned by the UK Government, whilst others were kept as cargo vessels to transport supplies to the United Kingdom.

Losses in the war were heavy, particularly to Germany's U-boat fleet. 41 ships were sunk by submarines including the loss of City of Benares, seven by air attacks, three by mines and one by a surface raider. In total, the Ellerman Group lost 60 ships out of its fleet of 105.

Sir Miles Mattinson died in 1944, still in office aged 89 years, and H.S. Holden duly replaced him as Chaiman

=== Post-war recovery ===
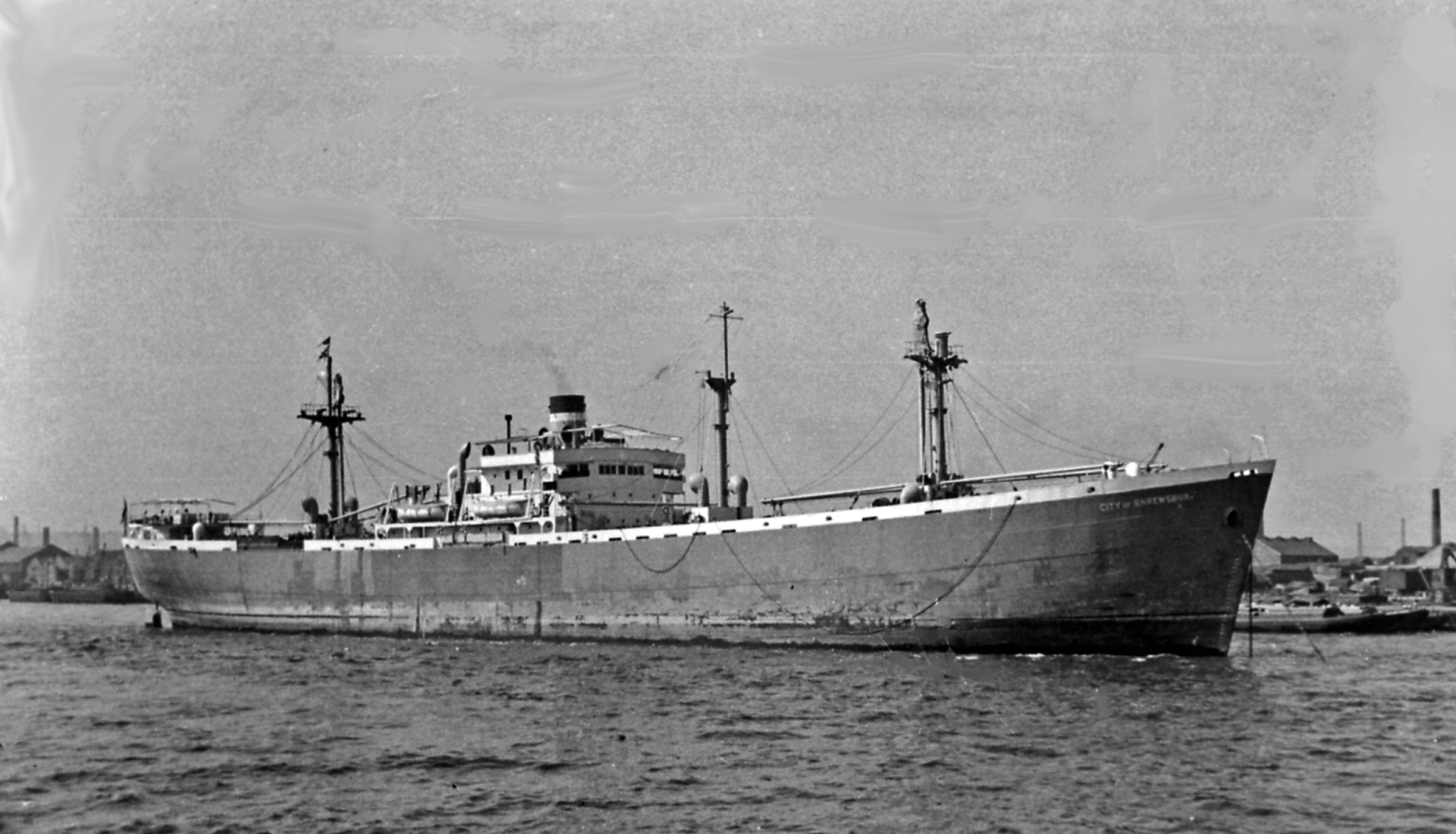
Liberty ship City of Shrewsbury, launched in 1943 as Ben H Miller. Ellerman and Papayanni bought it in 1947.

As with the period after the losses of the First World War, a new building programme was undertaken. A new policy meant the building of fast steam cargo liners that carried no more than a dozen passengers in considerable comfort. Crew accommodation was likewise improved. The focus was on re-building their international trade routes and to this end they purchased outright 12 cargo ships from the Government which they had managed in the war. By 1952, 25 of these new style 12-passenger ships had entered service, making for a total of 45 new vessels since the war, and with a further 14 for use on the Portuguese trade routes and Mediterranean services. By 1953 Ellerman's fleet had been almost completely rebuilt, consisting of a total of 94 ships with a carrying capacity of 900,000 tons.

In 1967, as containerisation began to rationalise the World's shipping services, Ellerman Lines (excluding the Wilson operation) controlled 59 oceangoing vessels.

=== Decline ===
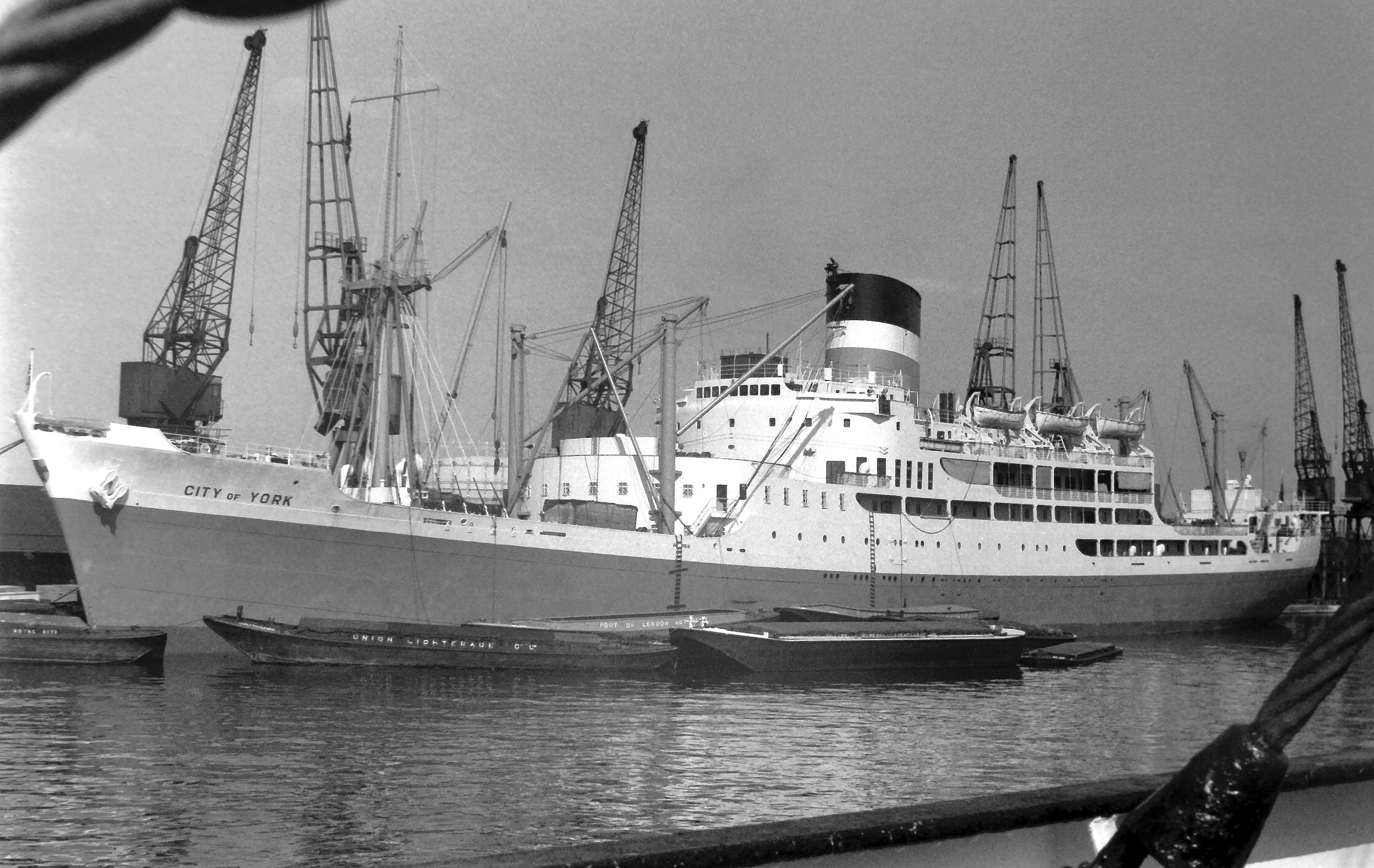
City of York, built 1953, in London (1967)

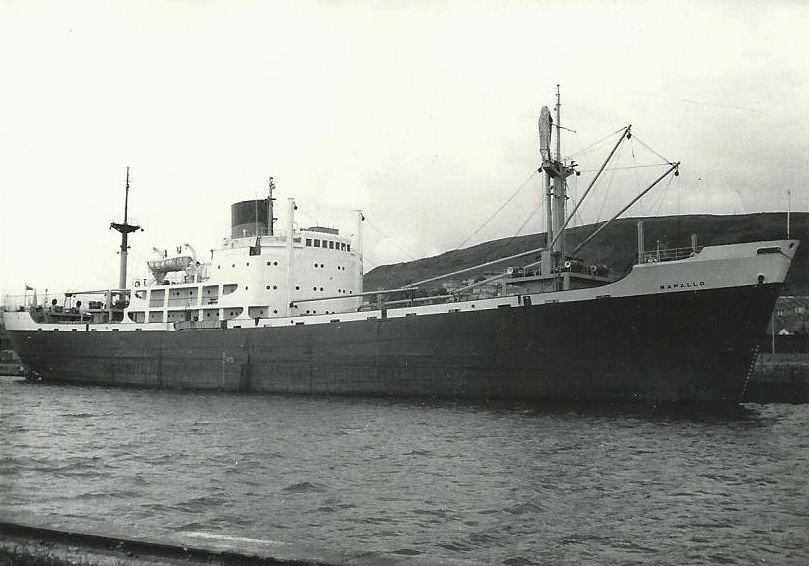
Wilson Line's Rapallo, launched in 1960

Trading was however becoming more difficult with newly independent nations, such as India, setting up their own shipping companies. The nature of shipping was also changing, with the advent of containerisation. In 1966 Ellerman Lines joined the Associated Container Transportation (ACT) Group consortium and started the successful containerisation of its Mediterranean services. By the early 1970s the Ellerman group had expanded its commercial interests into other areas, including hotels, brewing and printing. In 1973 it merged all its shipping companies into one division.

Ten years later its profitability had plummeted and it was making heavy losses. The whole business was then sold to the Barclay brothers. In 1985 the shipping business was bought by its management, then sold to the Trafalgar House conglomerate, which merged it with its ownership of the Cunard Line to form Cunard-Ellerman in 1987. In 1991 they passed it to the Andrew Weir Shipping Group, who sold it to Hamburg Süd in 2003. In 2004 the name was dropped and Ellerman Lines ceased to exist.

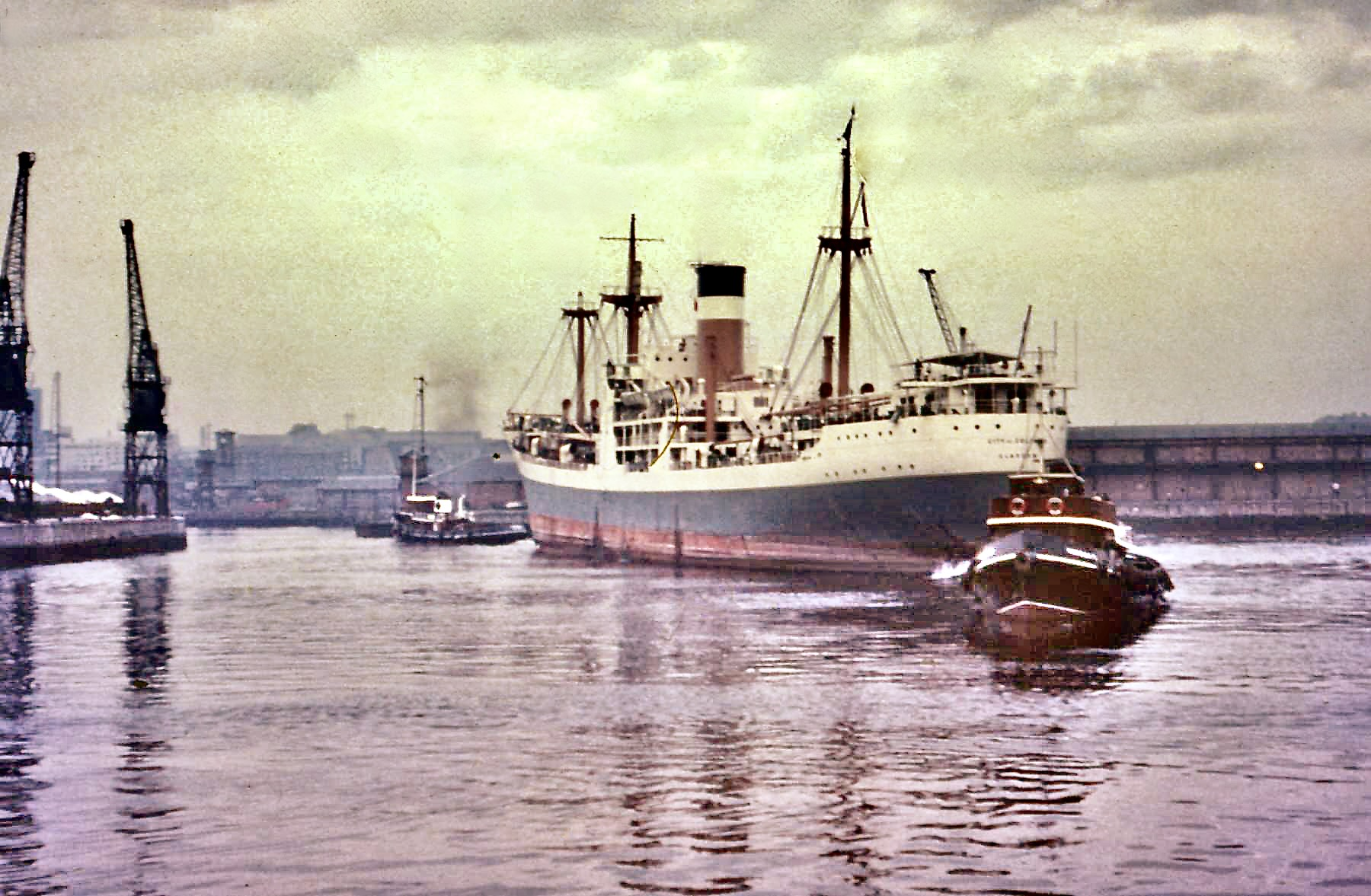
City of Colombo leaving Glasgow in 1970

=== Revival of the Ellerman name ===
Ellerman City Liners, a subsidiary of UniOcean Lines, was relaunched in 2021, bringing the Ellerman name back into commercial use for the first time since 2004. The company now operates container shipping services between Europe and the USA.

== Ships of the Ellerman Lines ==
Name	Built	EL Service	Notes
Algerian	1874	1901–1903	ex Lesbian. Scrapped in 1903.
Assiout	1889	1901–1914	ex British Empire. Seized by Turkey at Smyrna and scuttled in 1915.
Assyrian	1914	1920–1940	ex MS Fritz. Converted from diesel to steam in 1925. Torpedoed and sunk by U-101 in 1940.
Baralong	1901	1901–1915; 1916–1922	Requisitioned as a Q-ship in WW1 as HMS Baralong. Renamed HMS Wyandra. Returned 1916 and renamed Manica. Sold and renamed Kyokuto Maru and later Shinsei Maru No.1. Scrapped 1933.
Branksome Hall	1904	1904–1918	Torpedoed and sunk by UB-105 off Libya in 1918.
Castilian	1890	1909–1917	ex Umbilo. Torpedoed and sunk by U-61 off Ireland in 1917.
Castilian	1919	1919–1943	Struck rocks near The Skerries and sank in 1943.
Castilian	1955	1955–1966; 1967–1971	1963 renamed City of Peterborough, 1964 reverted to Castilian. 1966–67 chartered to Cunard Line, temporarily renamed Arabia, 1971 sold and renamed Maldive Freedom.
City of Athens (1)	1899	1901–1917	Mined and sunk off Cape Town in 1917
City of Athens (2)	1923	1923–1942	Torpedoed and sunk by U-179 off Cape Town in 1942.
City of Auckland	1958	1958–1978	Sold and renamed Gulf Falcon, 1983 Broken Up, Bombay
City of Benares	1936	1936–1940	Torpedoed and sunk by U-48 in 1940 while carrying child evacuees. 258 people died, including 35 women and 81 children. This was the worst maritime disaster in Ellerman Lines' history.
SS City of Birmingham	1917	1917–1940	Struck a mine on August 16, 1940, and sank. All 80 on board were saved.
City of Brisbane	1918	1918–1918	Torpedoed and sunk off Newhaven, Sussex by UB-57, August 13, 1918. All 5 crew members were saved.
City of Brooklyn	1949	1949–1967	1967 sold and renamed Lefkadios. Caught fire at sea and sank in 1970.
City of Cairo	1915	1915–1942	Torpedoed and sunk by U-68 in 1942.
City of Cambridge	1870	1870–1881	Sold to Clan Line and renamed Clan MacLean
City of Cambridge	1882	1882–1917	Torpedoed and sunk of Algieria by UC-67 in 1917
City of Cambridge	1920	1920–1934	Wrecked in the China Sea
City of Chester	1943	1944-1971	Built at Clydeholm Yard, Glasgow. 11/1971 broken up at Whampoa, Hong Kong
City of Colombo	1956	to 1977	August 1977 to Ben Line Steamers Ltd. 9 March 1979 scrapped at Kaohsiung.
City of Corinth	1898	1898–1912	Sold in 1912 to the Compagnie de Navigation Sud-Atlantique and renamed Sequana. Torpedoed on 8 June 1917 by German U-boat SM UC-72 in the Bay of Biscay. Some 196 (mostly Senegalese) troops, three passengers and six crew lost their lives.
City of Durban	1954	1954–1974	Broken up in 1974
City of Exeter	1914	1914–1950	Requisitioned by the Admiralty as a troopship 1914 –1915. Scrapped in 1950
City of Exeter	1974	1976–1980	Ex P&O Strathdare. Sold and renamed Phoevos.
City of Harvard	1907	1921–1934	Ex North German Lloyd Giessen Taken over by the Shipping Controller in 1919, Acquired from Lamport and Holt in 1921. Scrapped in 1934
City of Hull	1947	1947–1967	Scrapped 1967
City of Johannesburg	1920	1920–1942	ex Melford Hall, renamed 1926. Torpedoed and sunk by U-504 in 1942.
City of Khartoum	1946	1946–1968	Sold to Ben Line and renamed Benalligin. Scrapped in 1972.
City of Khios	1878	1901–1915	Seized by Turkey at Smyrna and scuttled in 1915.
City of Liverpool	1948	1948–1967	Sold and renamed Kavo Grossos. Scrapped in 1973.
City of Liverpool	1970	1970–1981	Sold and renamed Marianthe. Scrapped in 1986.
City of London	1947	1947–1969	Registration number 181612. Broken up in 1969.
City of Manila	1916	1916–1942	Torpedoed and sunk by U-406 in 1942.
City of Melbourne	1919	1919–1942	Torpedoed and sunk by U-156 in 1942.
City of Nagpur	1922	1922–1941	Torpedoed and sunk by U-75 in 1941.
City of Naples	1908	1908–1926	Wrecked on the Zenisu Reef, 15 June 1926.
City of Oxford	1870	1870–1881	Sold to Clan Line and renamed Clan MacDuff
City of Oxford	1881	1881–1914; 1919–1924	Taken over by Admiralty 1914-1919, converted to dummy of battleship HMS St Vincent. Scrapped in 1924.
City of Oxford	1926	1926–1942	Torpedoed and sunk by U-552 in 1942.
City of Paris	1922	1922–1940; 1947–1956	Requisitioned by the Admiralty in WW2. Scrapped in 1956.
City of Poona	1912	1912–1935	Scrapped in 1935
City of Poona	1946	1946–1968	Sold 1968 and renamed Benarkle. Scrapped in 1974.
City of Port Elizabeth	1952	1952-1971	Sold 1971 and renamed Mediterranean Island and 1975 Mediterranean Sun. Scrapped 1980.
City of Pretoria	1937	1937–1943	Torpedoed and sunk by U-172 in 1943. All 149 people on board died.
City of St Albans	1963	1963-1983	Scrapped in 1983
City of Shanghai	1917	1917–1941	Torpedoed and sunk by U-103 in 1941.
City of Shrewsbury	1943	1947–1959	ex Liberty ship Ben H. Miller. Sold and renamed Marucla.
City of Simla	1921	1921–1940	Torpedoed and sunk by U-138 in 1940.
City of Sydney	1930	1930–1958	Accidentally rammed and sank William Cory and Son collier Corchester on 19 February 1956. Sold and renamed Nicholaos Tsavliris.
City of Valencia	1908	1919-1934	ex Roda (Kosmos Line), acquired in 1919 as war reparations. Scrapped in 1934.
City of Venice	1924	1924–1943	Torpedoed and sunk by U-375 in 1943.
City of Wellington	1925	1925–1942	Torpedoed and sunk by U-506 in 1942.
City of Westminster	1916	1921–1923	ex Rudelsburg. Sank after hitting the Runnel Stone on 8 October 1923.
City of Winchester (1)	1914	1914–1914	Captured on maiden voyage by the German cruiser Königsberg and scuttled.
City of Winchester (2)	1917	1917–1941	Torpedoed and sunk by U-103 in 1941.
City of York	1953	1953-1971	Sold 1971 and Renamed Mediterranean Sky. Beached 2002.
Empire Faith	1941	1941–1942	CAM ship managed for the MoWT.
Flaminian	1917	1917–1944	Sold to MoWT and renamed Empire Flaminian. Transferred to the Royal Engineers in 1947. scrapped in 1950.
Flaminian	1956	1956–1975	1974 renamed City of Izmir. Sold and renamed Climax Pearl, then renamed Maldive Pearl. Scrapped in 1984.
Lesbian	1915	1915–1917	Shelled and sunk by U-35 in 1917.
Lesbian	1923	1923–1940	Seized by Vichy French forces in Beirut and scuttled in 1941.
Sardinia	1888	1902–1908	ex Gulf of Corcovado and Paolo V. Destroyed by fire and grounded in 1908.
Tasso	1938	1938–1940	Torpedoed and sunk by U-52 in 1940.
Thurso	1919	1919–1942	Torpedoed and sunk by U-552 in 1942.
Volo	1938	1938–1941	Torpedoed and sunk by U-75 in 1941.

== Legacy ==
Several port cities have streets named after John Ellerman, for example Amsterdam and Antwerp.
