= SS Lesbian (1915) =

Cargo ship built in 1915

History
- Name: Lesbian
- Namesake: Inhabitants of the island of Lesbos
- Owner: Ellerman Lines
- Port of registry: (United Kingdom of Great Britain and Ireland) Liverpool
- Builder: W. Harkess & Sons, Middlesbrough
- Yard number: 207
- Launched: 3 April 1915
- Completed: July 1915
- Identification: UK official number: 137465
- Fate: Sunk, 5 January 1917

General characteristics
- Type: Cargo ship
- Tonnage: 2,555 GRT
- Length: 93.1 m (305 ft 5 in) (lpp)
- Beam: 12.9 m (42 ft 4 in)
- Propulsion: 1 × triple-expansion steam engine
- Speed: 11 knots (20 km/h; 13 mph)

SS Lesbian was a cargo ship built for the Ellerman Lines in 1915. On 5 January 1917 she was shelled and sunk by the German U-boat U-35, the most successful U-boat participating in World War I, without loss of life.

== Design and construction ==
Lesbian was a built as a cargo ship for the Ellerman Lines by W. Harkess & Sons of Middlesbrough. Sources do not indicate when Lesbian's keel was laid, but she was launched on 3 April 1915, and completed by July of the same year. The ship was 93.1 metres (305 ft 5 in) long (between perpendiculars) and was 12.9 metres (42 ft 4 in) abeam. She was powered by a single triple-expansion steam engine and had a top speed of 11 knots (20 km/h; 13 mph). Lesbian was registered at 2,555 gross register tons (GRT). Sources do not indicate what size crew she carried. Lesbian was defensively armed against attacks by submarines, but available sources provide no indication of the size or number of guns with which she was equipped.

== Career ==
Little information is available about Lesbian's short career, but details about her final voyage suggest that she may have been employed in cargo service between India and the United Kingdom. For her final voyage, she departed Calicut—where she had taken on a general cargo bound for London and Tees—in December 1916. After passing through the Suez Canal, Lesbian entered the Mediterranean Sea and headed towards Malta. While 125 nautical miles (232 km; 144 mi) from there on 5 January 1917, she encountered U-35, under the command of Kapitänleutnant Lothar von Arnauld de la Perière.

At 16:15 on 5 January 1917, U-35 shelled and sank Lesbian east of Malta at position 35°48′N 17°6′E. Although complete details of U-35's attack on Lesbian are not reported in sources, von Arnauld de la Perière's typical method of attack was to open fire with his submarine's 4.1-inch (100 mm) deck gun from a distance of 6,000 yards (5,500 m) and close to 3,000 yards (2,700 m). There he would wait until the crew had abandoned the ship in lifeboats and then shell the bow and stern of the ship until it sank. Von Arnauld de la Perière claimed that he always provided crews of his victims with directions to the nearest port, but there is no indication in sources whether or not this was done for Lesbian's crew. The master of Lesbian was taken prisoner aboard U-35 by von Arnauld de la Perière. There were no casualties among Lesbian's crew in the attack and sinking.

== See also ==
- SS Lesbian (1923) was a 2,352 GRT British cargo ship which was built by Swan, Hunter and Wigham Richardson Ltd, Newcastle upon Tyne in 1923 for Ellerman Lines Ltd. During World War II she was seized in 1940 by the Vichy French forces and later scuttled in 1941.

== Bibliography ==
- Gibson, R. H.; Maurice Prendergast (2003) [1931]. The German Submarine War, 1914–1918. Annapolis, Maryland: Naval Institute Press. ISBN 9781591143147. OCLC 52924732.
- Tennent, A. J. (2006) [1990]. British Merchant Ships Sunk by U boats in the 1914–1918 War. Penzance: Periscope Publishing. ISBN 1-904381-36-7.
