= HMS Hurricane =

Brazilian H-class destroyer

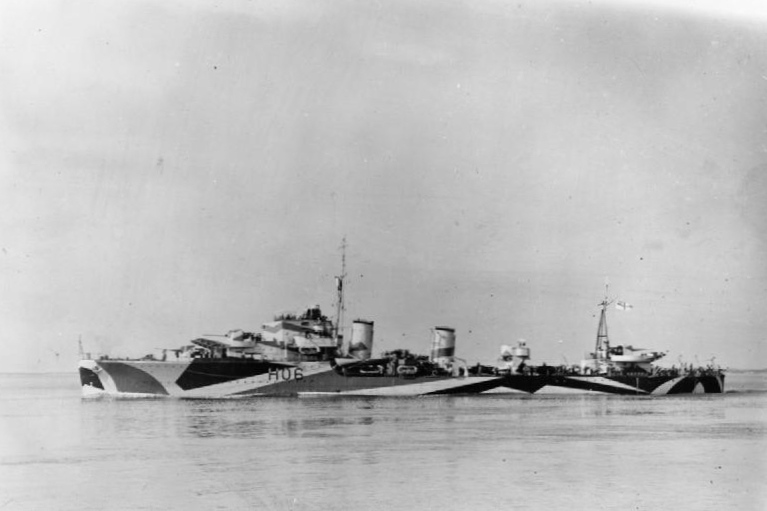
- HMS Hurricane

History

Brazil
- Name: Japura
- Ordered: 6 December 1937
- Builder: Vickers Armstrongs, Barrow-in-Furness
- Laid down: 3 June 1938
- Fate: Purchased by the United Kingdom, 5 September 1939

United Kingdom
- Name: HMS Hurricane
- Namesake: Hurricane
- Launched: 29 September 1939
- Acquired: 5 September 1939
- Commissioned: 21 June 1940
- Identification: Pennant number: H06
- Fate: Scuttled after a torpedo hit, 25 December 1943

General characteristics (as built)
- Class & type: Brazilian H-class destroyer
- Displacement: 1,350 long tons (1,370 t) (standard); 1,883 long tons (1,913 t) (deep load)
- Length: 323 ft (98.5 m)
- Beam: 33 ft (10.1 m)
- Draught: 12 ft 5 in (3.8 m)
- Installed power: 34,000 shp (25,000 kW)
- Propulsion: 2 shafts; Parsons geared steam turbines; 3 Admiralty water-tube boilers
- Speed: 36 knots (67 km/h; 41 mph)
- Range: 5,530 nmi (10,240 km; 6,360 mi) at 15 knots (28 km/h; 17 mph)
- Complement: 152
- Sensors & processing systems: ASDIC
- Armament: 3 × 1 – QF 4.7-inch (120 mm) Mk IX guns; 2 × 4 – 0.5-inch (12.7 mm) machine guns; 2 × 4 – 21-inch (533 mm) torpedo tubes; 110 × depth charges, 3 rails and 8 throwers

HMS Hurricane was an H-class destroyer that had originally been ordered by the Brazilian Navy in the late 1930s with the name Japura, but was bought by the Royal Navy after the beginning of World War II in September 1939 and later renamed. When completed in June 1940, the ship was temporarily assigned to the Home Fleet before she began escorting convoys and conducting anti-submarine patrols. She was badly damaged during a German air raid on Liverpool in May 1941 and her repairs were not completed until the beginning of 1942. Hurricane was then assigned as the flotilla leader of Escort Group B1 assigned to the Mid-Ocean Escort Force, escorting convoys in the North Atlantic for the next two years. The ship was torpedoed by a German submarine on Christmas Eve 1943, and had to be scuttled the next day as she was unable to steam back to port.

== Description ==
Hurricane displaced 1,350 long tons (1,370 t) at standard load and 1,883 long tons (1,913 t) at deep load. The ship had an overall length of 323 feet (98.5 m), a beam of 33 feet (10.1 m) and a draught of 12 feet 5 inches (3.8 m). She was powered by Parsons geared steam turbines, driving two shafts, which developed a total of 34,000 shaft horsepower (25,000 kW) and gave a maximum speed of 36 knots (67 km/h; 41 mph). Steam for the turbines was provided by three Admiralty 3-drum water-tube boilers. Hurricane carried a maximum of 470 long tons (480 t) of fuel oil, giving her a range of 5,530 nautical miles (10,240 km; 6,360 mi) at 15 knots (28 km/h; 17 mph). The ship's complement was 152 officers and men.

The vessel was designed for four 4.7-inch Mk IX guns in single mounts, designated 'A', 'B', 'X', and 'Y' from front to rear, but 'Y' gun was removed to compensate for the additional depth charges added. For anti-aircraft (AA) defence, Hurricane had two quadruple Mark I mounts for the 0.5 inch Vickers Mark III machine gun. She was fitted with two above-water quadruple torpedo tube mounts for 21-inch (533 mm) torpedoes. One depth charge rail and two throwers were originally fitted, but this was increased to three sets of rails and eight throwers while fitting-out. The ship's load of depth charges was increased from 20 to 110 as well. She was fitted with an ASDIC set to detect submarines by reflections from sound waves beamed into the water.

=== Wartime modifications ===
Little data on Hurricane's modifications during the war has survived, although it is known that she had her rear torpedo tubes replaced by a 12-pounder AA gun by October 1940. The ship's short-range AA armament may have been augmented by two Oerlikon 20 mm guns on the wings of the ship's bridge and the .50-calibre machine gun mounts may have also been replaced by a pair of Oerlikons. The ship's director-control tower and rangefinder above the bridge may have been removed in exchange for a Type 271 target indication radar. A Type 286 short-range surface search radar was probably also fitted midway through the war. The ship probably also received a HF/DF radio direction finder mounted on a pole mainmast. It is not known at what point the dazzle camouflage paint scheme was applied.

== Service ==
Japura was ordered by Brazil on 6 December 1937 from Vickers-Armstrongs, Barrow-in-Furness. The ship was laid down on 3 June 1938 and she was purchased by the British on 5 September 1939 after the beginning of World War II. Renamed HMS Hurricane, the ship was launched on 29 September and commissioned on 21 June 1940. She was assigned to the 9th Destroyer Flotilla of the Home Fleet upon commissioning until new construction replaced the losses suffered over the previous few months. Hurricane then began escorting convoys and conducting anti-submarine patrols until May 1941. On 17 September, the ship rescued survivors of City of Benares, a small passenger ship evacuating 90 children from the United Kingdom to Canada, and the freighter Marina. She rescued 451 survivors from the passenger-cargo liner City of Nagpur and landed them at Greenock, Scotland on 1 May 1941.

Hurricane was bombed and sunk in a German air raid on Liverpool during the night of 7/8 May 1941. She was struck by a bomb that passed through the hull and detonated underneath her. The explosion blew a large hole in her bottom and flooded her engine room and oil tanks. The ship's structure was badly damaged enough that her stern began to sag downwards and Hurricane was moved to Bidston Dock lest she sink and block traffic in the harbour. No one was killed in the attack, although a few crewmen received minor injuries.

The ship was repaired and returned to service in January 1942 as flotilla leader of Escort Group B1 assigned to the Mid-Ocean Escort Force. Hurricane remained as the leader for the next two years. Whilst escorting Convoy OS 62/KMS 36, the ship was hit by an acoustic T5 torpedo fired by the German submarine U-415 on the evening of 24 December 1943. The torpedo homed in on the ship's propeller noises and blew off 30 feet (9.1 m) of her stern. The explosion killed three and wounded nine of her crew, and rendered her unable to move. The following morning, she was scuttled by the destroyer Watchman at 45°10′N 22°05′W.
