= SS Flaminian (1917) =

British merchant ship

History

United Kingdom
- Name: Flaminian (1917–44); Empire Flaminian (1944–47); Flaminian (1947–50)
- Owner: Ellerman & Papayanni Lines (1917–44); Ministry of War Transport (1944–45); Ministry of Transport (1945–47); Royal Engineers (1947–50)
- Operator: Ellerman Lines (1917–47); Royal Engineers (1947–50)
- Port of registry: Liverpool
- Builder: W Harkness & Sons Ltd
- Yard number: 211
- Launched: 23 January 1917
- Completed: July 1917
- Out of service: 21 July 1950
- Identification: United Kingdom Official Number 140521; Code Letters JQRV (1917–34); Code Letters GRBV (1934-50)
- Fate: Scrapped

General characteristics
- Type: Cargo ship
- Tonnage: 2,699 GRT (1917–44), 2,763 GRT (1944–50); 1,696 NRT (1917–44), 1,650 NRT (1944–50)
- Length: 315 ft 0 in (96.01 m)
- Beam: 42 ft 4 in (12.90 m)
- Depth: 23 ft 6 in (7.16 m)
- Installed power: 226 nhp Triple expansion steam engine

Flaminian was a 2,699-gross register ton (GRT) cargo ship that was built in 1917 by W Harkness & Sons Ltd, Middlesbrough, Yorkshire, United Kingdom for Ellerman & Papayanni Lines. She was sold in 1944 to the Ministry of War Transport (MoWT) in 1944, converted to a cable storage hulk for Operation Pluto and renamed Empire Flaminian. Renamed Flaminian in 1946, she was used as a stevedore training ship from 1947, serving until scrapped in 1950.

== Description ==
The ship was built in 1917 by W Harkness & Sons Ltd, Middlesbrough, Yorkshire, United Kingdom. She was yard number 211.

The ship was 315 ft 0 in (96.01 m) long, with a beam of 42 feet 4 inches (12.90 m). She had a depth of 23 feet 6 inches (7.16 m). She was assessed at 2,699 GRT, 1,696 NRT,

The ship was propelled by a 226 nhp triple expansion steam engine, which had cylinders of 20¼ inches (60 cm), 34½ inches (95 cm) and 59 inches (150 cm) diameter by 42 inches (110 cm) stroke. The engine was built by Richardsons, Westgarth & Co Ltd, Middlesbrough. It drove a single screw propeller.

== History ==
The ship was built by W Harkness & Sons Ltd, Middlesbrough, Yorkshire, United Kingdom for Ellerman & Papayanni Lines. The third Ellerman Lines ship bearing that name, she was launched on 21 January 1917 and completed in July 1917. The Code Letters JQRV and United Kingdom Official Number 140521 were allocated. Her port of registry was Liverpool.

Flaminian sailed on routes between the United Kingdom and South Africa. She made a voyage from Table Bay to Southampton, Hampshire in 1919, and from Port Natal to the Clyde in 1920. Later that year, she made a voyage from Fredrikstad, Norway to Liverpool, Lancashire. By the late 1920s, Flaminian was operating between Liverpool and ports on the Mediterranean Sea. She sailed from Liverpool on 24 August 1929 for Malta and Alexandria, Egypt.

In 1934, Flaminian was assigned the Code Letters GRBV. She was still serving the Mediterranean at this time, sailing from Liverpool for İzmir and Istanbul, Turkey in March 1934. This continued in the years before World War II, with an identical voyage being made in November 1938.

Flaminian was probably in port at Liverpool when war was declared against Germany. She departed from Liverpool on 16 September 1939 and sailed to Southampton. She sailed on 24 September, arriving back at Southampton on 13 October. She departed on 21 October and sailed to Fowey, Cornwall, where she arrived on 22 October. Having sailed on 31 October, Flaminian arrived back at Fowey on 8 November. She departed on 16 November for Liverpool, arriving two days later and sailing on 25 November for Belfast, County Down, where she arrived the next day. She departed for Liverpool on 1 December, arriving two days later. Flaminian then joined Convoy OB 50, which became Convoy OB 10 on 13 December. The convoy arrived at Gibraltar on 18 December. Flaminian was carrying general cargo bound for Casablanca, Morocco. where she arrived on 18 December. She sailed the next day for Malta, arriving on 25 December. She sailed two days later for Jaffa, Mandatory Palestine, arriving on 1 January 1940.

Flaminian departed from Jaffa later that day for Haifa, Palestine, where she arrived on 2 January 1940. She sailed on 6 January for Beirut, Lebanon, arriving the next day and then sailing to Famagusta, Cyprus, where she arrived on 8 January. Flaminian sailed the next day for Limassol, arriving on 10 January. She departed on 17 January for Famagusta, which was reached later that day. She sailed on 20 January for Gibraltar, arriving on 30 January. Flaminian was a member of Convoy HG 17, which departed from Gibraltar on 1 February and arrived at Liverpool on 11 February. Carrying general cargo, she arrived at The Downs on 12 February.

Flaminian was a member of Convoy OA 105G, which departed from Southend, Essex on 7 March and formed Convoy OG 21 on 10 March, arriving at Gibraltar on 17 March. She was carrying general cargo bound for Alexandria. She sailed from Gibraltar on 20 March, arriving at Malta on 24 March and sailing four days later for Alexandria, where she arrived on 1 April. Flaminian sailed three days later for Haifa, arriving on 5 April and sailing the next day for Famagusta, where she arrived the next day. She departed the same day for Limmasol, where she arrived on 7 April. She sailed that day for Alexandria, arriving on 8 April. She departed on 13 April for Gibraltar, where she arrived on 23 April. Flaminian was a member of Convoy HG 28F, which sailed from Gibraltar on 26 April and arrived at Liverpool on 5 May. She was carrying cotton and general cargo.

Flaminian sailed on 15 June with Convoy OB 168, which formed Convoy OG 34F on 17 June. She arrived at Southend on 18 June. She sailed two days later as a member of Convoy FN 200, which arrived at Methil, Fife on 22 June. She left the convoy and put into Sunderland, County Durham on 21 June. She sailed on 13 July to join Convoy FN221, which had departed from Southend the previous day and arrived at Methil on 15 July. She then joined Convoy OA 186, which departed from Methin on 18 July and dispersed at sea on 21 July. She arrived at New York, United States on 5 August. Flaminian sailed on 10 August for Sydney, Cape Breton Island, Nova Scotia, Canada. She arrived on 14 August. She was a member of Convoy SC 2, which departed on 25 August and arrived at Liverpool on 10 September. Flaminian was carrying a cargo of grain and steel. She arrived at the Clyde on 10 September. Having unloaded her steel, she departed on 21 September as a member of Convoy WN 17, which arrived at Methil on 25 September. She then joined Convoy FS 292, which departed on 26 September and arrived at Southend on 28 September. Flaminian left the convoy at Hull, Yorkshire on 28 September.

On 19 October, Flaminian sailed to join Convoy FN 316, which departed from Southend on 23 October and arrived at Methil on 25 October. She was carrying general cargo. She joined Convoy EN 12/1, which sailed on 26 October and arrived at Oban, Argyllshire on 30 October. Flaminian collided with a Royal Navy destroyer on 27 October and detached from the convoy, arriving at Oban on 29 October. She sailed for the Clyde on 5 November, arriving the next day. Flaminian sailed on 17 November to join Convoy OB 244, which had departed from Liverpool that day and dispersed at sea on 22 November. She was bound for Barbados, which was reached on 10 December. She sailed the next day for Trinidad, arriving on 12 December. Flaminian departed from Trinidad on 17 December for Demerara, British Guiana, arriving on 20 December. She sailed for Trinidad on 29 December and arrived back there the next day.

Flaminian departed from Trinidad on 3 January 1941 for Saint Thomas, U.S. Virgin Islands, arriving two days later. She then sailed to Grenada, from where she departed on 6 January for Bermuda, which was reached on 13 January. She sailed on 24 January for Halifax, Nova Scotia, Canada, arriving on 29 January. Flaminian sailed on 8 February with Convoy SC 22, which arrived at Liverpool on 28 February. She was carrying general cargo, rum and sugar, some of which caught fire and she left the convoy, arriving at St. John's, Newfoundland on 15 February. She sailed for Halifax three days later, arriving on 23 February. Flaminian joined Convoy SC 27, which sailed on 30 March and arrived at Liverpool on 18 April. She was carrying general cargo. She left the convoy at Loch Ewe on 17 April and joined Convoy WN 116, which had sailed from the Clyde that day and arrived at Methil on 21 April. She then joined Concoy FS 470, which sailed on 22 April and arrived at Southend two days later. She left the convoy and put into the Tyne on 23 April.

Flaminian departed from the Tyne on 3 May for Middlesbrough, arriving later that day. She later joined Convoy FN 481, which departed from Southend on 17 June and arrived at Methil two days later. She sailed on 21 June to join Convoy EC 35, which had departed from Southend on 19 June and arrived at the Clyde on 25 June. She left the convoy t Oban on 23 June, sailing on 25 June to join Convoy OG 66, which had departed from Liverpool the previous day and arrived at Gibraltar on 8 July. Flaminian departed on 26 July for Lisbon, Portugal and sailing from there on 4 August for Gibraltar, which was reached two days later. Carrying general cargo, she sailed on 9 August with Convoy HG 70, which arrived at Liverpool on 23 August.

Flaminian sailed with Convoy OS 6 on 12 September. She arrived at Freetown on 3 October. She departed on 23 October for Monrovia, Liberia, from where she sailed on 25 October for Takoradi, Gold Coast, which was reached on 28 October. She sailed on 1 November for Lagos, Nigeria, arriving on 3 November. Flaminian departed on 15 November for Freetown, which was reached on 21 November. Carrying West African produce, she sailed on 30 November with Convoy SL 94, which arrived at Liverpool on 20 December. She left the convoy at Oban on 22 December, sailing with Convoy WN 223 three days later and arriving at Methil on 28 December. She sailed the next day as a member of Convoy FS 686, which arrived at Southend on 31 December. She left the convoy on 31 December and put into Hull.

Carryig cargo described as "government stores", Flaminian sailed from Hull on 16 February 1942 to Join Convoy FN 634, which departed from Southend the next day and arrived at Methil on 19 February. She then joined Convoy EN 49, which sailed on 20 February, arriving at Oban three days later. She sailed on 24 February to join Convoy OG 80, which had departed from Milford Haven on 22 February and arrived at Gibraltar on 8 March. Flaminian sailed on 7 April for Burriana, Spain, arriving the next day. She departed on 11 April, reaching Gibraltar three days later. Flaminian was a member of Convoy HG 82, which sailed on 27 April and reached Liverpool on 8 May. She left the convoy at the Belfast Lough on 7 May to join Convoy BB 172, which sailed on 9 May and arrived at Milford Haven the next day. Flaminian sailed on to Bristol, Gloucestershire, arriving on 11 May.

Flaminian departed from Bristol on 13 May, arriving at Swansea, Glamorgan the next day. She sailed on 19 May and reached Milford Haven on 20 May. She departed that day as a member of Convoy OG 84, which arrived at Gibraltar on 2 June. She left the convoy and put into Lisbon, arriving on 2 June. She sailed for Gibraltar on 27 June, arriving two days later. Flaminian was a member of Convoy HG 85, which sailed on 30 June and arrived at Liverpool on 12 July.

Flaminian departed from the Clyde on 20 July to join Convoy OG 87, which had departed from Milford Haven the previous day and arrived at Gibraltar on 3 August. She was carrying PoW mails bound for Lisbon, which was reached on 2 August. She sailed on 25 August, arriving at Gibraltartwo days later. Carrying general cargo and mercury, Flaminian departed on 29 August with Convoy HG 88, which arrived at Liverpool on 9 September. She left the convoy at Preston, Lancashire, arriving that day. She sailed on 25 September for the short voyage to Liverpool.

Flaminian sailed on 21 October to join Convoy KX 4A, which departed from the Clyde the next day and arrived at Gibraltar on 4 November. She left the convoy and put into the Clyde, arriving on 23 October. Flaminian sailed with Convoy KX 5 on 30 October, reaching Gibraltar on 10 November. She left the convoy at Lisbon, arriving on 8 November. Flaminian sailed on 12 December to join Convoy MKS 3Y, which had departed from Philippeville, Algeria on 6 December and arrived at Liverpool on 23 December. She left the Convoy at Loch Ewe on 24 December, sailing on 29 December as a member of Convoy WN 378, which reached Methil on 2 January 1943. Southend was reached on 5 January via Convoy FS 1003.

Flaminian departed from Southend on 27 January 1943 with Convoy FN 929, which reached Methil two days later. She then joined Convoy EN 193, which departed from Methil on 5 February and arrived at Loch Ewe on 7 February. She sailed on to Holyhead, Anglesey, arriving on 9 February and sailing that day with Convoy HM 117. She arrived at Milford Haven on 10 February. She sailed with Convoy KX 9 on 16 February. The convoy reached Gibraltar on 24 February but Flaminian put back in to Milford Haven, arriving on 17 February. She sailed on 25 February to join Convoy KMS 10G, which departed from the Clyde on 26 February and arrived at Bône on 11 March. She left the convoy at Lisbon, arriving on 7 March. She sailed on 4 April for Porto, Portugal, arriving three days later. She sailed on 19 April, arriving at Gibraltar two days later. Flaminian sailed with Convoy KMS 13 on 26 April. The convoy reached Bône on 29 April, but she put into Algiers on 28 April. She sailed on 11 May to join Convoy ET 20, which had departed from Bône two days earlier and arrived at Gibraltar on 14 May. She sailed on 28 May for Lisbon, arriving the next day. Flaminian departed on 11 June to join Convoy SL 130MK, which had formed at sea that day and arrived at Liverpool on 21 June.

Flaminian sailed on 17 August as a member of Convoy KMS 24G, which arrived at Gibraltar on 30 August. Her destination was Lisbon, which was reached on 29 August. She sailed on 18 September, reaching Gibraltar two days later. She sailed on 25 September with Convoy MKS 25G, which reached Liverpool on 8 October. She left the convoy and arrived in the Clyde that day.

Carrying general cargo, Flaminian sailed on 6 November to join Convoy OS 58KM, which had departed from Liverpool the previous day and split at sea on 18 November to form Convoy OS 58 and Convoy KMS 32. She was in the part of the convoy that formed Convoy KMS 32 and arrived at Gibraltar the next day. She sailed on 21 November for Lisbon, arriving two days later. Flaminian departed on 8 December, reaching Gibraltar on 10 December. She sailed three days later for Málaga, Spain, arriving on 16 December and sailing four days later for Gibraltar, which was reached on 21 December. Carrying a cargo of oranges and sardines, she sailed on 24 December with Convoy MKS 34G, which rendezvoused at sea with Convoy SL 143 on 25 December. The combined convoy arrived at Liverpool on 6 January 1944.

Carrying general cargo, she sailed on 24 January 1944 as a member of Convoy OS 66KM, which split at sea on 5 February. She was in the portion that formed Convoy KMS 40 and arrived at Gibraltar on 7 February. Laden with a cargo of oranges, she sailed on 21 February with Convoy MKS 40G, which rendezvoused at sea with Convoy SL 149 on 22 February. The combined convoy arrived at Liverpool on 7 March. She left the convoy at Loch Ewe on 6 March and joined Convoy WN 554, which arrived at Methil on 9 March. She then joined Convoy FS 1386, which sailed that day and arrived at Southend two days later. She arrived at the Tyne on 10 March. Flaminian sailed on 24 March to join Convoy FS 1401, which had departed from Methil that day and arrived at Southend on 26 March. She sailed on 2 April with Convoy FN 1315, which arrived at Methil on 4 April. She arrived at Middlesbrough on 3 April, sailing on 8 April to join Convoy FS 1416, which had dailed from Methil that day and arrived at Southend on 10 April.

Flaminian was sold to the MoWT on 17 April and renamed Empire Flaminian. Converted to a cable storage hulk for use in Operation Pluto, she was now assessed as 2,763 GRT, 1,696 NRT. She was operated under the management of Ellerman Lines. Empire Flaminian departed from Southend on 9 June with Convoy ETC 4, which arrived in the Seine Bay the next day. She departed on 23 June with Convoy FTM 16, which arrived at Southend the next day, returning the following day with Convoy ETC 48, which arrived at the Seine Bay on 26 July. She sailed on 28 July with Convoy FTC 50, which arrived at Southend the next day. Empire Flaminian left the convoy at the Cowes Roads.

Empire Flaminian departed from the St Helens Roads on 6 October with Convoy FTC 30A, which arrived at Southend the next day. She put into Newhaven, East Sussex on 6 October, sailing on 9 October to join Convoy FTC 32A, which had departed from the Seine Bay the previous day and arrived at Southend that day. She sailed from Southend on 4 November with Convoy FN 1531, which arrived at Methil on 6 November. Empire Flaminian put into Hull, where she arrived on 6 November.

Empire Flaminian sailed on 25 February 1945 to join Convoy FS 1739, which had departed from Methil that day and arrived at Southend on 27 February. Her next movements are not recorded, but she sailed from the Solent on 17 April to join Convoy BTC 129, which had departed from Milford Haven on 15 April and arrived at Southend on 18 April. She sailed from Southend on 30 April and anchored in The Downs.

Empire Flaminian departed from The Downs on 21 August for London, arriving later that day. On 25 September, she was laid up in the River Blackwater, Essex. Empire Flaminian departed on 29 October. She was returned to Ellerman Lines in 1946 and was renamed Flaminian.

In 1947, Flaminian was converted to a stevedore training ship. Based at Marchwood, Hampshire, she was used by the Royal Engineers as a training ship for stevedores. Empire Flaminian arrived at Dover, Kent on 21 July 1950 for scrapping.
