= SS Volo =

Coordinates: 31°45′N 26°48′E

History

United Kingdom
- Name: Volo
- Namesake: Volos, Greece
- Operator: Ellerman's Wilson Line Ltd, Hull
- Port of registry: Hull
- Builder: Swan, Hunter & Wigham Richardson Ltd, Newcastle upon Tyne, England
- Yard number: 1582
- Launched: 15 February 1938
- Completed: April 1938
- Out of service: 28 December 1941
- Identification: Call sign GFFK; UK official number 165701
- Fate: Torpedoed and sunk on 28 December 1941

General characteristics
- Class & type: cargo steamship
- Tonnage: 1,587 GRT; tonnage under deck 1,220; 768 NRT
- Length: 283.9 feet (86.5 m) p/p
- Beam: 40.2 feet (12.3 m)
- Draught: 17 feet 0 inches (5.18 m)
- Depth: 15.7 feet (4.8 m)
- Ice class: "strengthened for navigation in ice"
- Installed power: 335 NHP
- Propulsion: triple-expansion steam engine; low-pressure steam turbine; single screw
- Crew: 30 crew + 8 DEMS gunners
- Sensors & processing systems: wireless direction finding
- Notes: sister ship: Tasso

SS Volo was a British steam cargo ship that was built on Tyneside in 1938 and sunk by a German U-boat in the Mediterranean Sea off North Africa in 1941. 23 people on board the Volo died as a result of the attack.

== Building ==
Volo was one of a pair of sister ships that Swan, Hunter and Wigham Richardson of Newcastle upon Tyne built for Ellerman's Wilson Line Ltd. The first was Tasso, which Swan Hunter completed in February 1938. Volo was completed in April 1938. Ellerman's registered both ships in Hull. The line named Volo after the port of Volos in Thessaly, Greece, which is one of many Mediterranean ports with which the company traded.

Volo had six corrugated furnaces with a combined grate area of 115 square feet (11 m^{2}) heating two 210 lb_{f}/in^{2} single-ended boilers with a combined heating surface of 4,043 square feet (376 m^{2}). The boilers fed a three-cylinder triple expansion steam engine that in turn exhausted into a low-pressure steam turbine. The turbine had double-reduction gearing, the two engines drove a single screw, and their combined power output was rated at 335 NHP.

== Career and sinking ==
In the Second World War Volo served in a number of convoys, starting in September and October 1939 with two round trips between the Bristol Channel and the Loire. From November 1939 until May 1940 she made four round trips between Liverpool and Gibraltar, then in June 1940 she sailed from the Dardanelles to Port Said. From August 1940 until December 1941 she operated from ports in Egypt to support UK and Allied forces in the Siege of Malta and the Battle of Greece.

In December 1941 Volo was a member of Convoy ME-8 from Malta to Alexandria. Her Master was George Ronald Whitfield, MBE. Early on the morning of 28 December the German submarine U-75 attacked the convoy. The U-boat torpedoed Volo, sinking her about 45 nautical miles (83 km) northwest of Mersa Matruh, Egypt. Captain Whitfield, 20 crew members and three DEMS gunners were killed. Nine crew members and five DEMS gunners survived, were rescued by the Royal Navy Landing Ship, Tank HMS LCT-11 and taken to Alexandria.

Two of ME-8's escorts, the destroyers HMS Kipling and HMS Legion, pursued U-75. After two and a half hours Kipling sank the U-boat with depth charges, killing 14 of her 44 crew.
