= MS Mediterranean Sky =

Shipwreck in Greece

Coordinates: 38.0244°N 23.4892°E

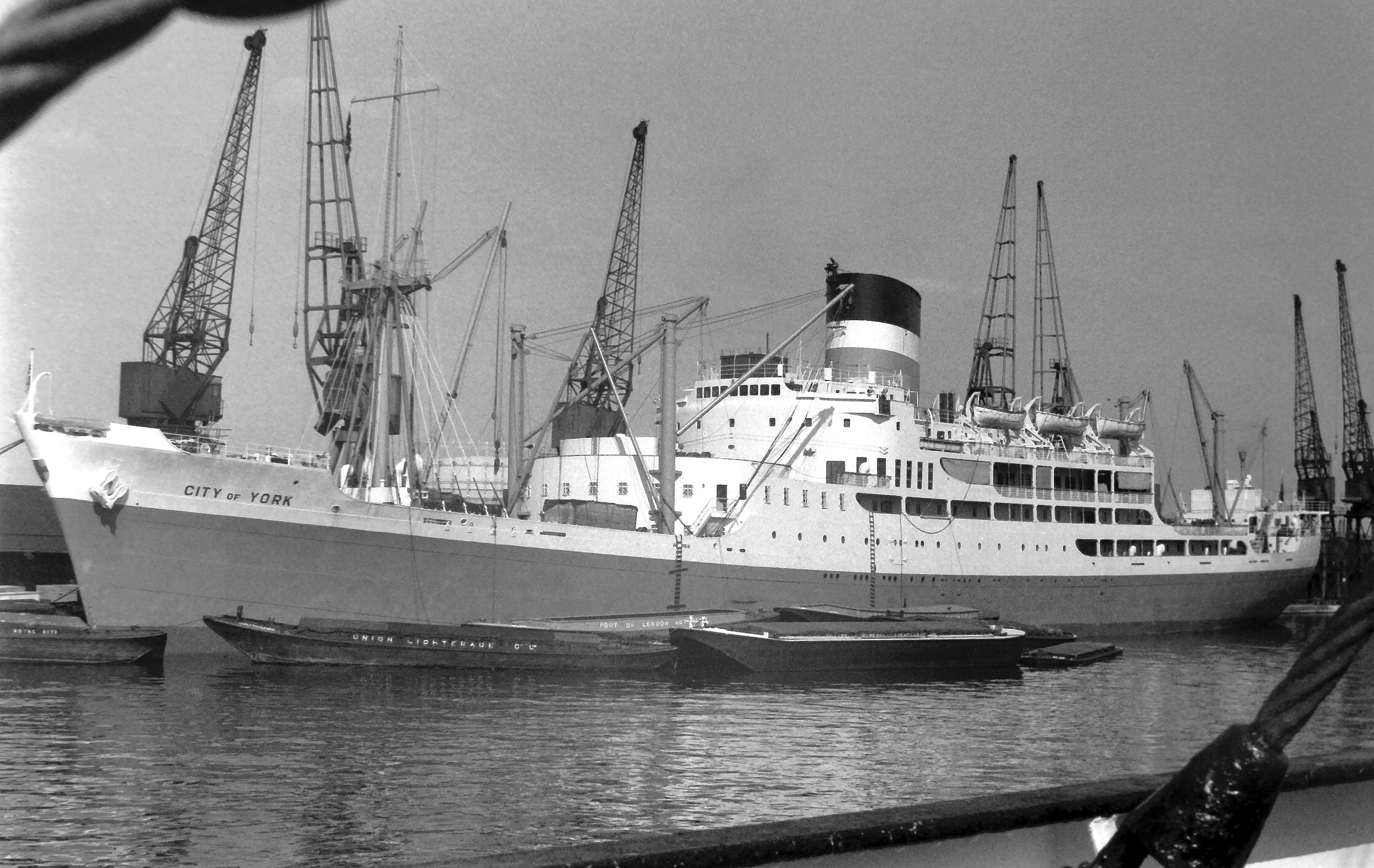
- City of York in London, 1967

History
- Name: City of York (1953–1971); Mediterranean Sky (1971–2003)
- Namesake: York, England (original)
- Owner: Ellerman Lines (1953–1971); Karageorgis Lines (1971–1995); Golden Cruises (1995–2003)
- Operator: Ellerman Lines (1953–1971); Karageorgis Lines (1972–1994); Phoenix Cruises (1994–1995); Golden Cruises (1995–2003)
- Port of registry: London, United Kingdom (1953–1982); Piraeus, Greece (1982–2003)
- Builder: Vickers Shipbuilding and Engineering, Barrow-in-Furness
- Yard number: 122
- Launched: 30 March 1953
- Christened: 1953
- Completed: 1953
- Acquired: 1953
- Maiden voyage: 17 November 1953
- In service: 1953
- Out of service: 1971; 1996
- Identification: IMO number: 5074226; Call sign: SXMA
- Fate: Capsized in 2003
- Notes: Location 38.024673,23.489579

General characteristics
- Tonnage: 16,533 GRT; 11,582 DWT
- Length: 164.8 m (540 ft 8 in)
- Beam: 21.7 m (71 ft 2 in)
- Decks: 4
- Propulsion: Twin-screw with 2 × six-cylinder, two-stroke, opposed-piston Hawthorn-Leslie-Doxford 67LB6 of 12,850 bhp (9,580 kW) (total) at 115 rpm.
- Speed: 16.5 knots (30.6 km/h; 19.0 mph)
- Capacity: 107 passengers (originally); 850 passengers (post 1972)

MS Mediterranean Sky is a combination-passenger liner built in 1953 for Ellerman Lines' service between London and South Africa. Originally named TSMV (Note: Standing for: 'Twin Screw Motor Vessel') City of York, she was sold in 1971 to Karageorgis Lines, converted to a cruiseferry and renamed.

== Background ==
In the years following World War II, the Ellerman Lines had built or acquired 52 ships to replace the ones lost in the war. By 1950, nine new vessels were either under construction, or waiting to be ordered − the last of which was not expected to be delivered until 1953. Four of the ships ordered in 1949, were a set of sister ships. Built in Barrow-in-Furness, England, City of York was the third of the four cargo liners—the lead vessel was TSMV City of Port Elizabeth, followed by TSMV City of Exeter and the final ship in the class was TSMV City of Durban.

The ships were constructed by the Barrow-in-Furness shipbuilder Vickers-Armstrong.

In March 1952, City of Port Elizabeth was launched, and it was revealed she would be the first of four sister ships built for South African service. City of Port Elizabeth, which was the company's first passenger liner to be launched since the war, was followed by City of Exeter.

== Features ==
=== Power ===
City of York propulsion was supplied by two main engines—two-stroke cycle single acting six-cylinder diesel engines. Each engine contained six-cylinders with the dimensions 26-3/8" - 91-5/10". The engines were manufactured by R. & W. Hawthorn, Leslie and Company. The ship contained two-double-ended boilers.

=== Technology ===
City of York featured a direction finder (wireless), echo sounding device, gyro-compass, radar, and radio-telephone.

== History ==
=== Ellerman Lines career (1953–1971) ===
City of York was announced by name in December 1952. City of York was built by Vickers Shipbuilding and Engineering of Barrow-in-Furness in the United Kingdom. She was launched on 30 March 1953, without any ceremony. Her maiden voyage was scheduled for 20 October 1953, but in June the maiden voyage was rescheduled for 17 November. She underwent her Sea trials on a voyage from River Tyne on 23 October 1953.

Along with her three sister ships, City of Port Elizabeth, City of Exeter and City of Durban, she operated on the route between London, Las Palmas, Cape Town, Port Elizabeth, East London, Durban, Lourenço Marques and Beira, making passage between London and Cape Town in 15 days.

A fire broke out in an electrician's cabin while the ship was docked in South-West India Dock, London, on 23 May 1954. The fire was contained to the cabin and quickly extinguished. On 8 February 1955, Princess Marie Louise of Schleswig-Holstein, grand-daughter of Queen Victoria, sailed upon City of York for a ten-week voyage to South Africa and back. At the age of 82, she used the voyage to work on her autobiography. During the voyage, the princess was received on board at every port of call by local dignitaries, and went ashore to return calls and attend parties.

On a voyage to Plymouth in November 1956, Hedley Davidson, the ship's third engineer, disappeared overboard after departing the engine room. The ship and her crew searched for him for five hours but he could not be located.

==== Forresbank rescue ====
On 9 November 1958, City of York discovered the Glasgow cargo ship Forresbank ablaze after an engine fire engulfed the ship, 18 miles (29 km) off of the Pondoland Coast. The ship was discovered around 9 AM, and had been burning since around 2 AM. Captain T. Speakman maneuvered the ship to pick up the first lifeboat, which contained Indian sailors. A second lifeboat — which had drifted south — sent off flares to attract City of York to its location. A third lifeboat was located to the stern of Forresbank, while three men were seen on the stern.

Several officers rescued from the burning ship insisted on returning to pick up the three stranded shipmates via a motorboat. Captain Simmonds of Forresbank returned to the ship with 15 of his crew, when he had thought the fire had died down enough. The party split up, with half going forward, and the other going aft. While they were on board, an explosion emanated from the engine room, sending flames through the corridors. Simmonds ordered the men back to the lifeboat, but they were separated and three men were unable to escape due to the flames. The rescue party was unable to reach the trio on the stern, and whom were prevented from jumping to the lifeboat below due to circling sharks. Forresbank drifted until ship ran aground south of Durban. An inquest was opened into the cause of her wreck. The salvage rights were awarded to a company based out of Johannesburg by Lloyds for £2,000. In 1960, a number of exacerbating components were identified by the Court of Inquiry but not the cause of the fire.

During the night of 7 October 1959, 200 tons of the ship's cargo, consisting mainly of motor vehicles, lubricating oil, linseed oil, detergent, and reels of cable, which were destined for Durban, caught fire. The flames were extinguished while at East London, Cape Province. The damaged cargo was unloaded, and the ship continued on to Durban the following day.

For a brief period in 1962, City of York and her three sister ships were taken to the dry docks department of Swan, Hunter & Wigham Richardson for a "special survey." In February 1963, a general servant of the crew hanged himself in a cabin while the ship was dry docked in Wallsend. In May 1963, a large party for about 250 guests was held on the ship for the North of England shippers and importers.

The ship's captain, William Dick, was promoted in July 1966 to the position of commodore of the Ellerman Line's entire fleet. In November 1966, it was announced that starting the following summer, City of York and her three sister ships receive a £100,000 refurbishment, and would operate as cruise ships, cruising between Middlesbrough, Rotterdam, Hamburg, and London. The trips were to last six or seven days, and cost between £40 and £70. While the ship cruised to different destinations, she collected cargo to be taken to South Africa. There were five cargo collecting cruises scheduled between late April and the end of September, before the ship's next trip to South Africa. Her first cargo collecting cruise departed on 24 April 1967.

In 1968, the capacity of cruise passengers was reduced from 100, to 90. In 1969, special "reduced fare" sailings started being advertised for the trips to South Africa.

In April 1971, City of Port Elizabeth was rumored to be up for sale, after the 184-person crew was fired upon arriving to the Tyne. The company explained that they were unprepared to undertake the expensive refits the ships needed. The Ellerman Lines later in May confirmed a buyer was being sought, which raised concerns about the fate of her sister ships. The company stated it was unsure whether the rest of the sister ships would be put up for sale as well. In June, it was decided Ellerman Lines would be withdrawing a total of four of their ships from the South African service and putting them up for sale, including City of York.

=== Later career and contract work (1971–1994) ===
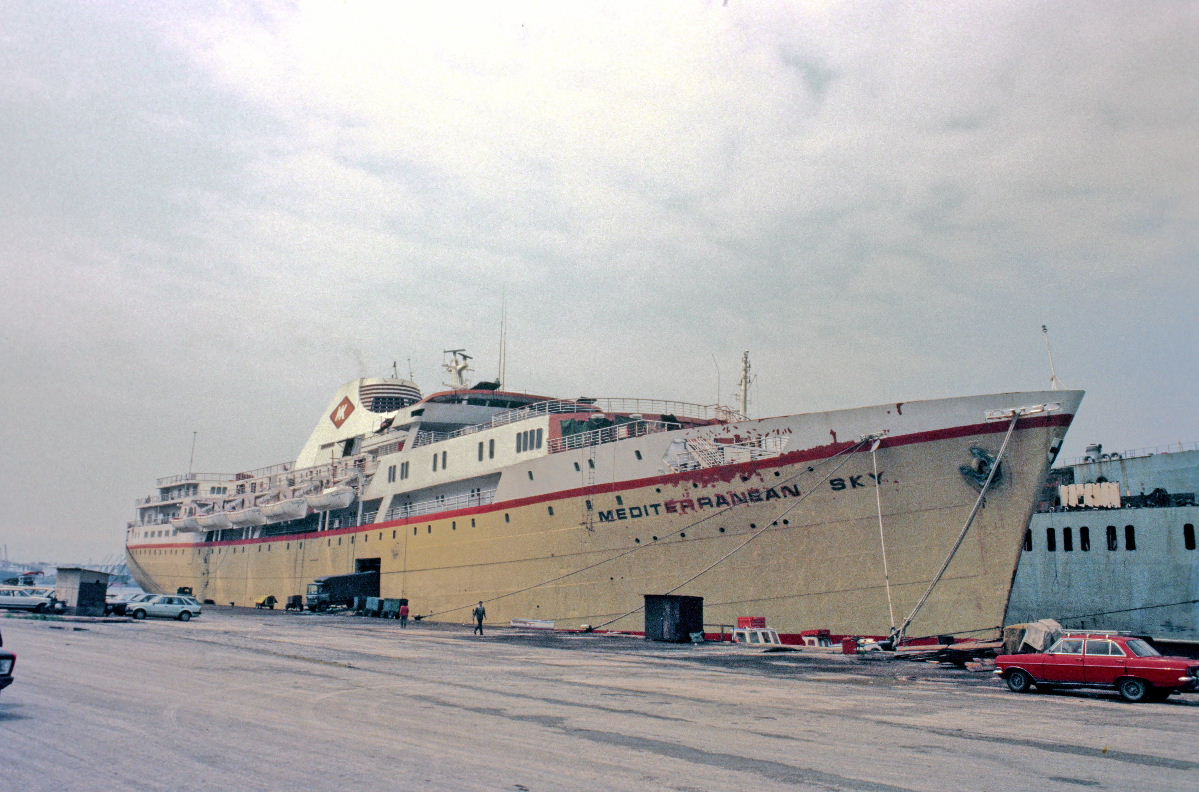
Mediterranean Sky in Perama, 1986

City of York, after completing her final trip back from South Africa, was docked at Amsterdam awaiting a buyer. In September 1971, she was sold, along with her three sister ships, to Karageorgis Lines for £1,250,000. Their fates were unconfirmed until December 1972, when it was announced the four ships would be converted into "luxury passenger car ferries operating between Greece and Italy." Despite plans, only she and City of Exeter were converted into ferries and renamed Mediterranean Sky and Mediterranean Sea respectively. City of Durban was intended to be renamed Mediterranean Dolphin, and her conversion into a ferry began in 1975, but midway through the plans were halted and she was sold for scrap around 1980. City of Port Elizabeth was to become Mediterranean Sun.

In 1987, to accommodate the increase in tourism to Australia for the sailing competition America's Cup, 15 passenger liners were chartered to be used as "floating hotel rooms". Holiday Inn chartered Mediterranean Sky for the event and dubbed her the "America's Cup Holiday Inn".

Starting in December 1987, the ship advertised cruises to Antarctica, on ten-day cruises out of Tierra del Fuego. She would sail through Beagle Channel, Drake Passage and South Shetland Islands and call at several research stations on the Antarctic peninsula. The cruises were offered in December, January, and February, summer in the southern hemisphere. The planned cruises were canceled, possibly due to a lack of bookings.

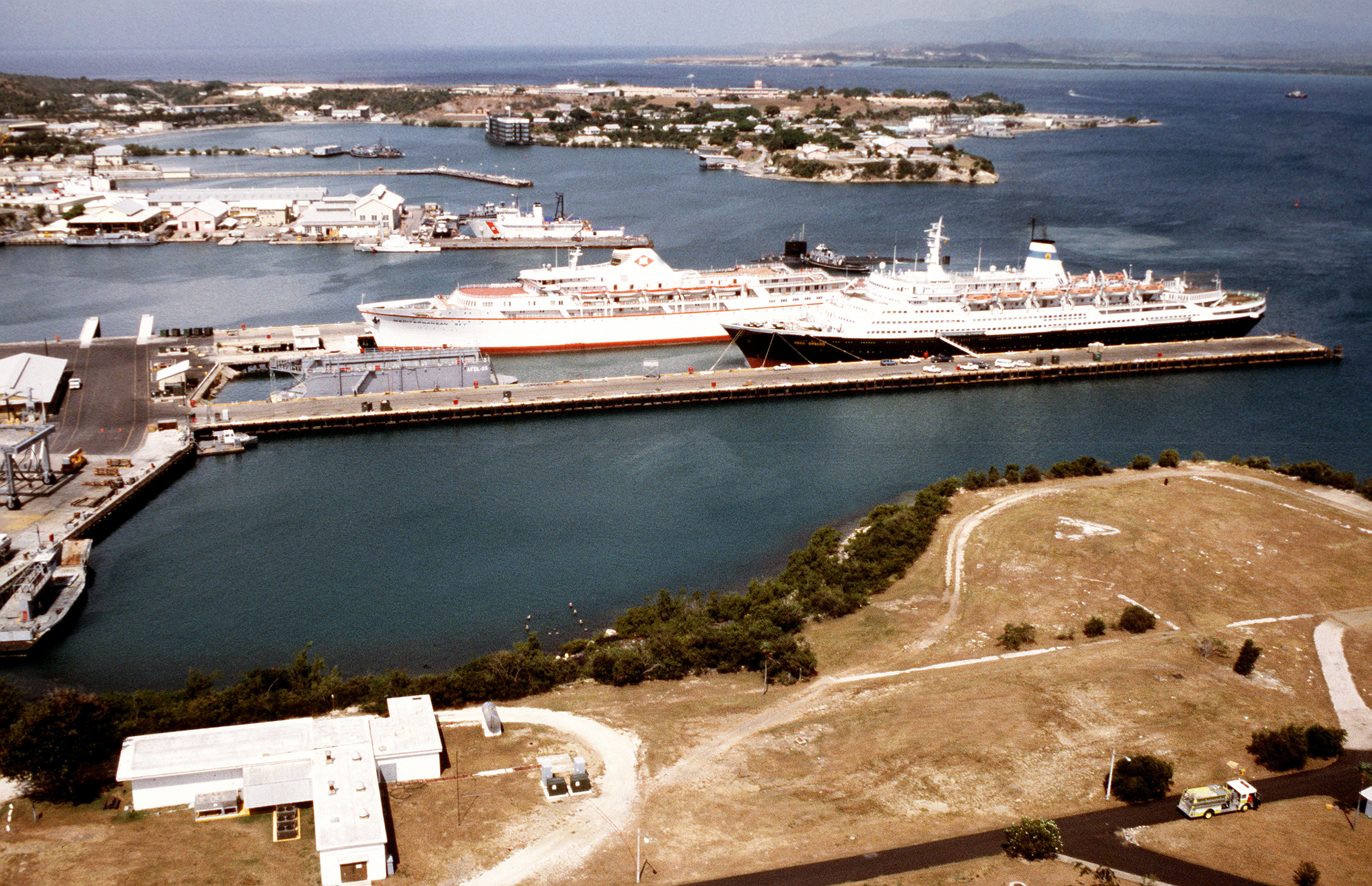
Mediterranean Sky (left) and Ivan Franko (right)

In 1991, the ship was hired for three sailings by a "British-based Zionist organization" at a cost of $500,000 to carry Jews from the former Soviet Union to Israel. On 23 December, the ship departed Odesa, Ukraine, and 27 December arrived in Haifa carrying 477 Soviet Jews, 55 tourists, 22 Israeli government officials, and 17 Christians. After her first trip, the ship was equipped with signs in Russian explaining proper behavior at sea. The ship departed Israel with 15 former immigrants, and several dozen tourists. Mediterranean Sky returned from Odesa the second time on 6 January 1992, with 387 immigrants. The ship returned to Israel for the third and final trip, 16 January, with 532 immigrants.

At a cost of $13 million, the United States contracted to use the ship to ferry thousands of Americans, mostly troops, out of Somalia during their civil war in 1994. Beginning in January, 219 soldiers boarded the ship to be taken to Mombasa, Kenya, where they would then take commercial flights home. It became the largest seaborne evacuation of US troops since the Vietnam War. With plans to finish withdrawing by 31 March, the Clinton Administration became divided on whether to leave "a small diplomatic contingent behind." A farewell ceremony was held for troops in an airport hangar prior to them boarding the ship.

In June 1994, the United States government used the ship as an interview space for Haitian refugees in the Turks and Caicos Islands. Later that year, Mediterranean Sky was moved to Guantánamo Bay to be used as makeshift housing for troops working in refugee camps.

=== Protests, failed scrapping, and capsizing (1995–present) ===
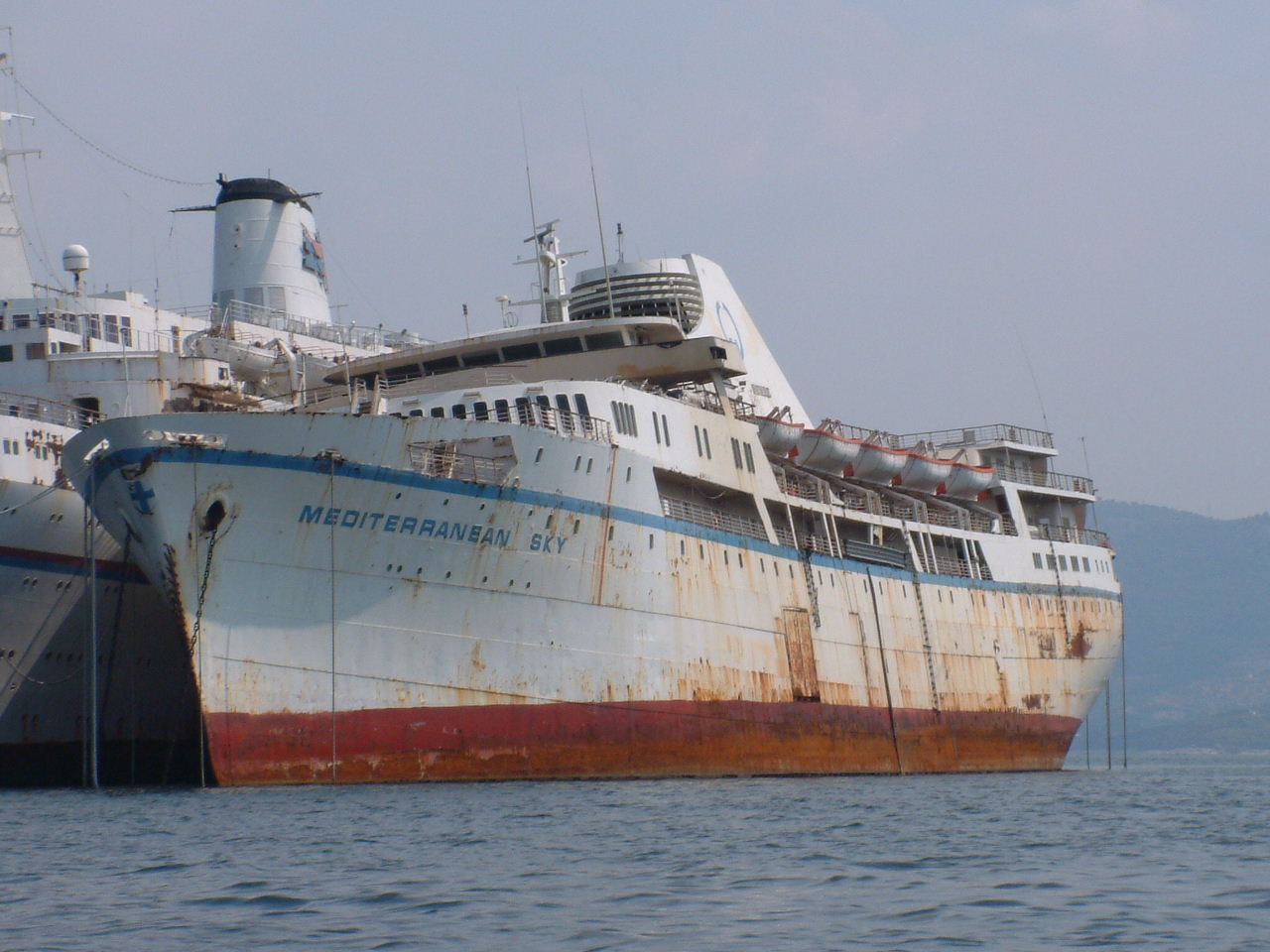
Mediterranean Sky in Elefsis, 2002

Mediterranean Sky sailed for the last time from Patras to Brindisi in August 1996. A sailor of Mediterranean Sky later reported to the newspapers that the ship had been stranded in Brindisi for two days, after running out of fuel, showcasing the poor financial state of Karageorgis Lines. As soon as she returned, she was decommissioned in the port of Patras. The ship remained inactive at the pier of Agios Nikolaos, in the city of Patras until February 1999.

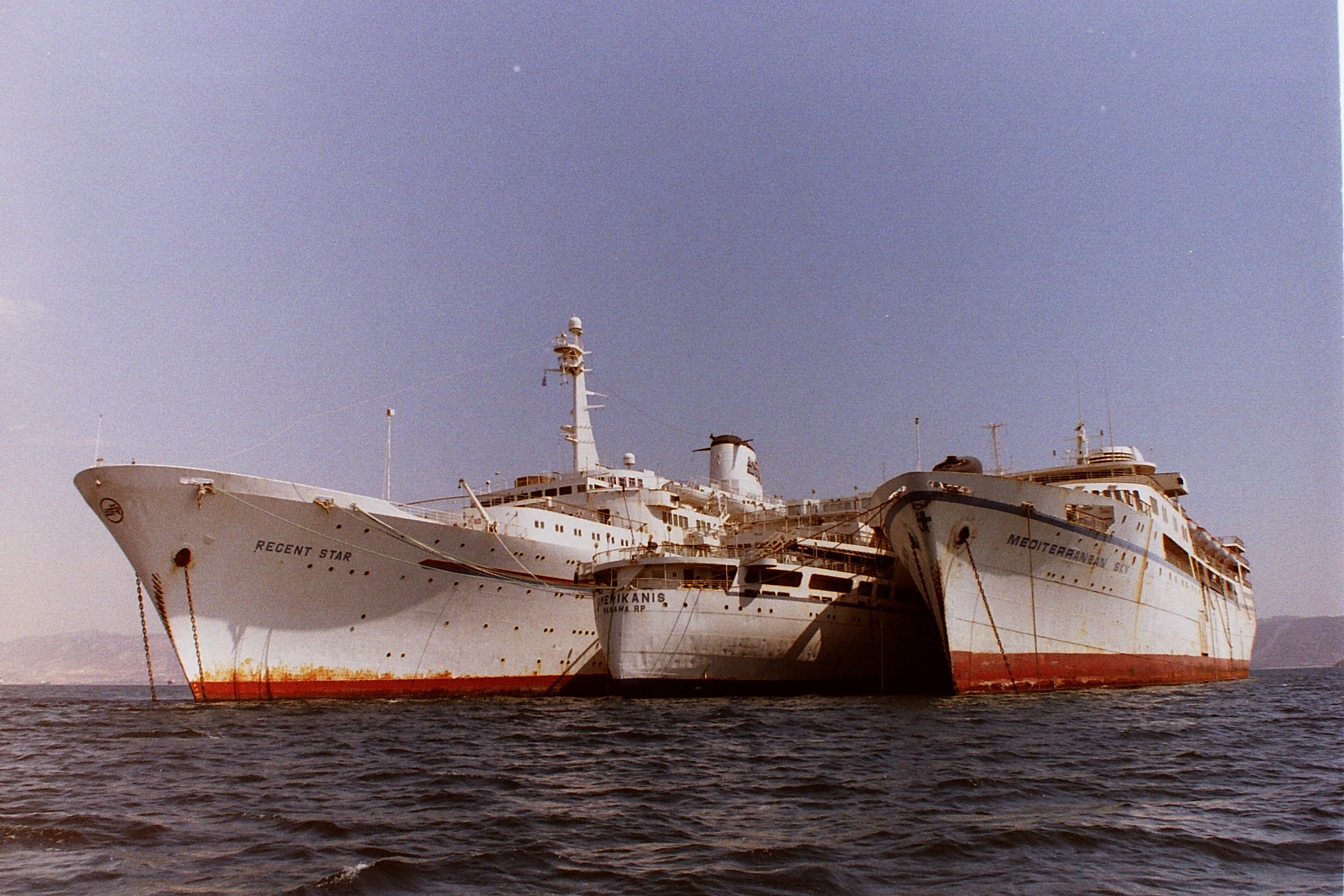
Mediterranean Sky (far right), in Elefsina, 2000

The ship's charterer, Phoenix Cruises, and the shipowner, Karageorgis, showed no interest in the fate of the ship and the crew. A report by Panos Theodorakopoulos in December 1996 stated that approximately 45 sailors remained on the ship and refused to disembark unless they received their accrued wages, which amounted to 180 million drachmas (adjusted for inflation, roughly US$550,000 in 2025).

“The only asset we own at this moment is this steamer,” read the banner hung on the bow of the ship. For at least five months they remained on the ship without water and electricity and declared their determination to spend Christmas in the dark. "The living conditions are tragic. With a candle and flashlights, we reach the cabins, while there is no water," said one of the sailors.

The sailors were fed with a portion of food from the Naval Home. Another captain had declared, “We are not squatters, we are asking for what belongs to us”. And he continued by explaining why they were not abandoning the ship: "If the ship goes ten miles out it changes flag since it belongs to a Panamanian company and then we lose our money." The shipowner proposed to give them about 6 million drachmas as a compromise solution to pay off the debt, but the workers refused. The case was taken to court. The ship was transported to Eleusis Bay at the expense of the Port Fund of Patras, where it remained abandoned and bound by the company's debts. She started listing after being laid up in Eleusis, Greece. The abandoned ship was then towed to shallow water where she was beached on 26 November 2002.

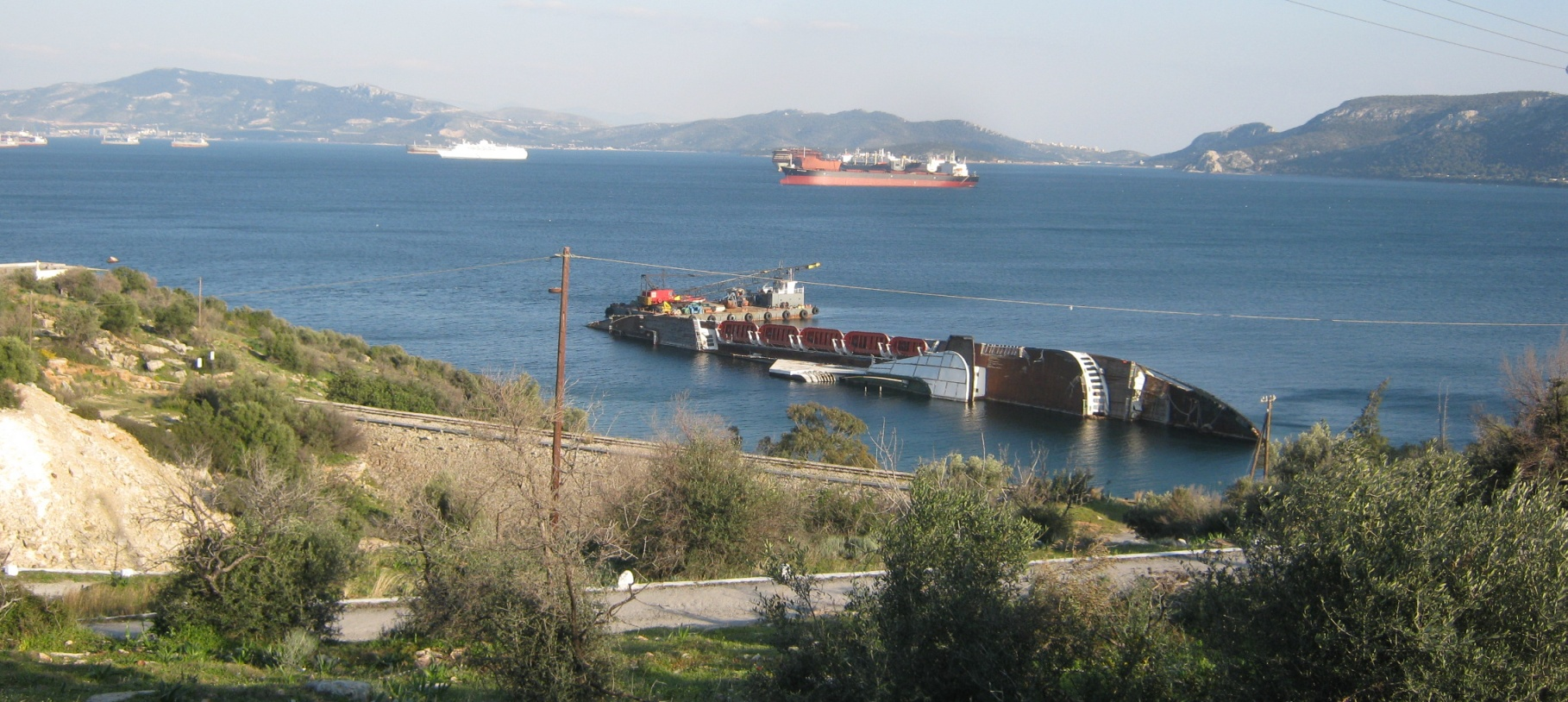
Wreck of Mediterranean Sky, 2011

In 2009, it was decided to remove the ship from the site, along with 17 other wrecks in the Gulf of Eleusis, but this was not done. She capsized and sank by January 2003 with the half-submerged wreck still visible in 2025.

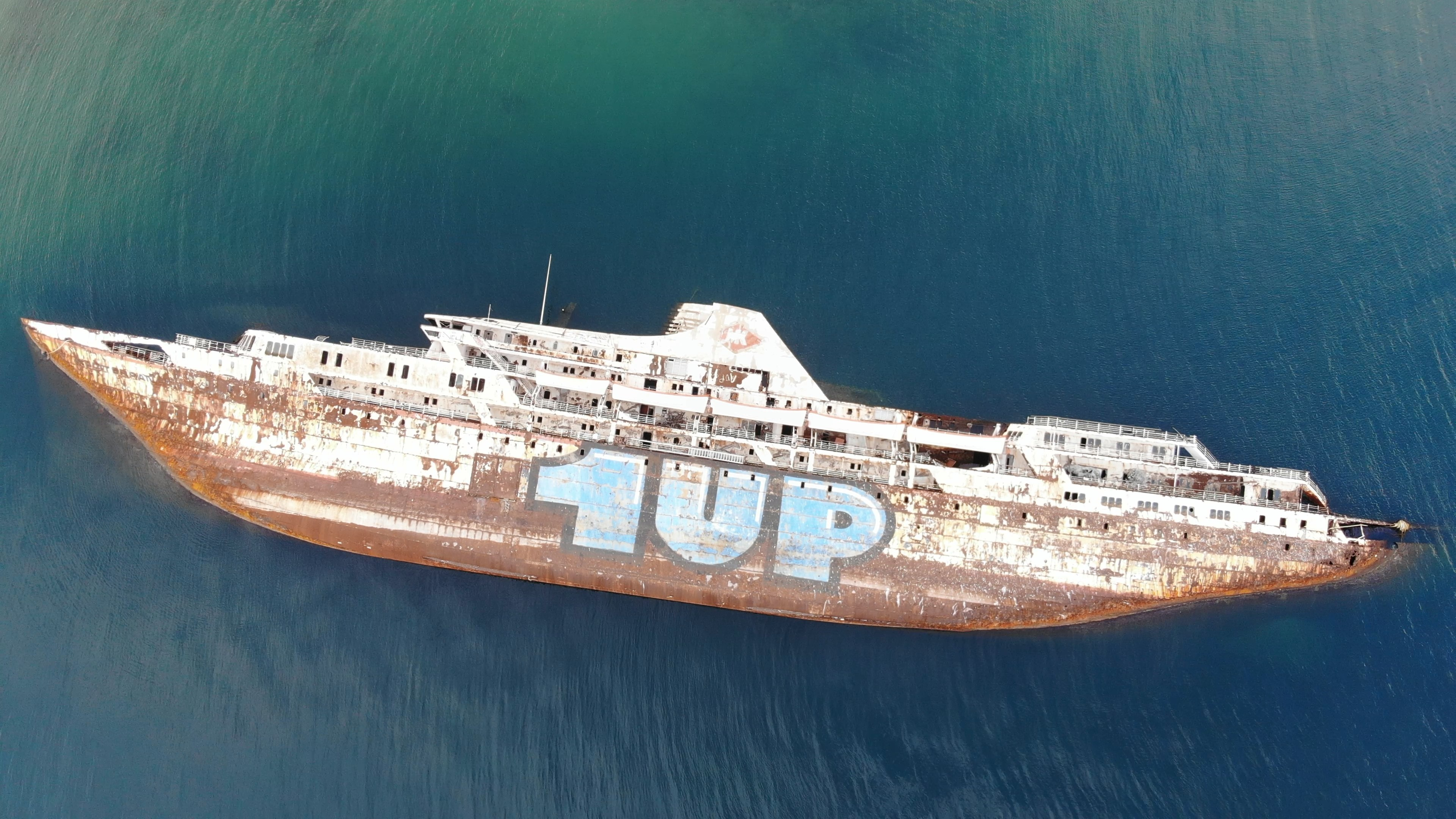
2018 drone shot of the capsized wreck with 1UP's graffiti on its side

In 2018, the Berlin-based Graffiti crew 1UP roller-painted their name across the exposed side of the ship, which can be seen on satellites.

A study was performed in June 2016, analyzing the risk assessment of potential hazardous material leaks from shipwrecks in Greece. Led by University of Athens professors Nikolaos P. Ventikos, Konstantinos Louzis, Alexandros Koimtzoglou, and Pantelis Delikanidis, it was determined Mediterranean Sky held a "Reasonably Probable" likelihood of her leaking, causing "significant" to "severe" environmental damage. In November 2020, what appeared to be oil or fuel began leaking from the ship.

The capsized wreck caught fire in July 2022.

== Bibliography ==
=== Books ===
- Collard, Ian (2014). Ellerman Lines: Remembering a Great British Shipping Company. New York: History Press. ISBN 978-0-752-48963-6.
- Clarkson, John; Fenton, Roy (1993). Ships In Focus: Ellerman Lines. United Kingdom.
- Payne, Kenneth; Brown, Ulick (1992). Ellermans In South Africa 1892-1992. Cape Town: Board of Ellerman and Bucknall (Pty.) Ltd.
