= SS City of Nagpur =

Sunken British passenger steamship

Coordinates: 52°30′N 26°0′W

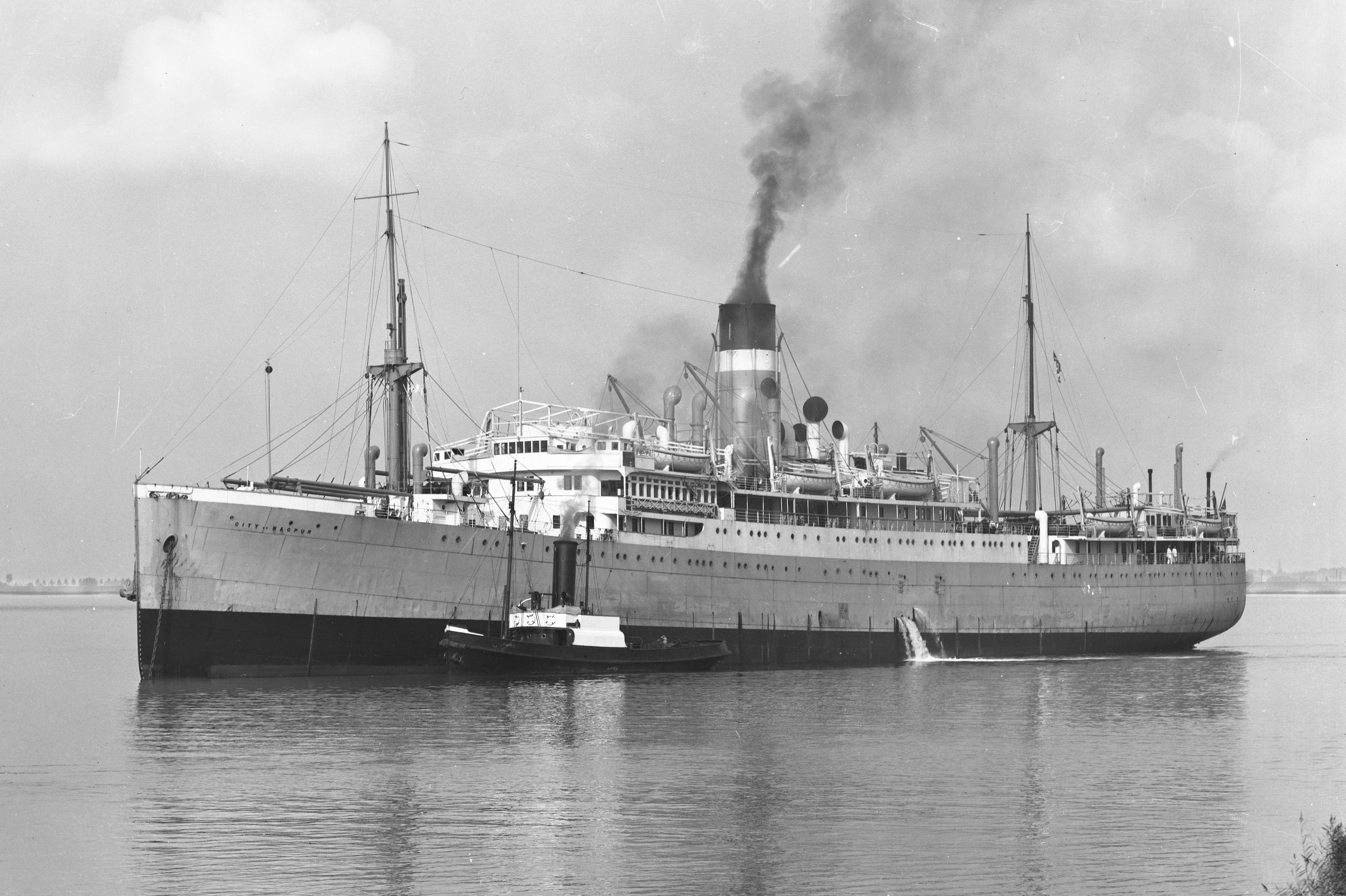
- City of Nagpur

History

United Kingdom
- Name: City of Nagpur
- Operator: Ellerman Lines Ltd, London
- Port of registry: Glasgow
- Builder: Workman, Clark and Company, Belfast
- Yard number: 464
- Launched: 30 May 1922
- Completed: September 1922
- Identification: UK official number 146310; code letters KMRV (until 1933); Call sign GJLP (1934 onwards)
- Fate: Sunk on 29 April 1941

General characteristics
- Tonnage: 10,146 GRT; tonnage under deck 8,935; 6,285 NRT
- Length: 469.9 ft (143.2 m)
- Beam: 59.3 ft (18.1 m)
- Draught: 42 ft 8 in (13.0 m)
- Depth: 40.0 ft (12.2 m)
- Propulsion: quadruple expansion steam engine; Single screw
- Speed: 14 kn (26 km/h; 16 mph)
- Armament: (1941); 1 × 4 in (100 mm) naval gun; 1 × 3 in (76 mm) 12-pounder HA/LA gun; 1 × Bofors 40 mm gun; 2 × Hotchkiss guns; 2 × Lewis guns; 2 × Unrotated Projectile launchers

SS City of Nagpur was a British passenger steamship. She was built in 1922 by Workman, Clark and Company, Belfast for Ellerman Lines Ltd of London. She was registered in Glasgow. She was sunk in the Second World War in 1941.

== Sinking ==
Her final voyage was intended to take her from Glasgow to Karachi, via Freetown, Natal and Bombay. Passengers included families of RAF personnel stationed in the then Southern Rhodesia under the Empire Air Training Scheme. She was armed with a 4-inch gun, a 12-pounder, one Bofors, two Hotchkiss, two Savage Lewis machine guns and two PAC rockets. Her Master was David Llewellyn Lloyd and she was carrying 468 people and 2,184 tons of general cargo. She was travelling unescorted.

On 28 April she and the RFA Brown Ranger were sighted sailing west of Valentia Island, Ireland by the German submarine U-75 under the command of Kapitänleutnant Helmuth Ringelmann. U-75 attacked City of Nagpur at 0608 hours, and the Brown Ranger at 1314 hours but missed on both occasions. At 0100 hours in the morning of 29 April the U-boat fired another torpedo at City of Nagpur, which hit her in the engine room on her starboard side. Her location was 52°30'N, 26° W. Both wireless sets were damaged beyond use. Lloyd gave immediate orders to abandon ship and by 0120 hours all passengers were away; the crew then also followed in the remaining lifeboats, nine in all. U-75 surfaced during these manoeuvres and opened machine-gun fire. Last to leave were the gunners, who had returned fire continuously from the forward Bofors guns. The 4-in gun aft and the nearby 12-pounder could not bear down at such close range (400 to 500 feet (120 to 150 m)) and the machine guns did not fire for fear of hitting the lifeboats. Shortly after 0130, as Lloyd was last to abandon ship, U-75, having circled the vessel, fired a second torpedo, which struck No 2 hold, nearer the bow and on the port side.

When the lifeboats were well away, U-75 stood off about a quarter-mile and fired 12 to 15 rounds at the superstructure. At about 03.30 there was a big explosion, presumed to be a third torpedo. City of Nagpur settled rapidly and then sank. The nine boats that got away, carrying 452 survivors, roped themselves in line. The wireless transmitter in the lifeboat proved to have a flat battery, though fully charged on leaving Greenock; but at dawn the survivors spotted a Consolidated PBY Catalina flying boat and signalled for help. The pilot noted their position and at 2110 hrs on the 29th, although they had drifted 50 nautical miles (93 km), they were picked up by the destroyer HMS Hurricane and landed at Greenock on 1 May.
