= German submarine U-75 (1940) =

German World War II submarine

Coordinates: 31°50′N 26°40′E

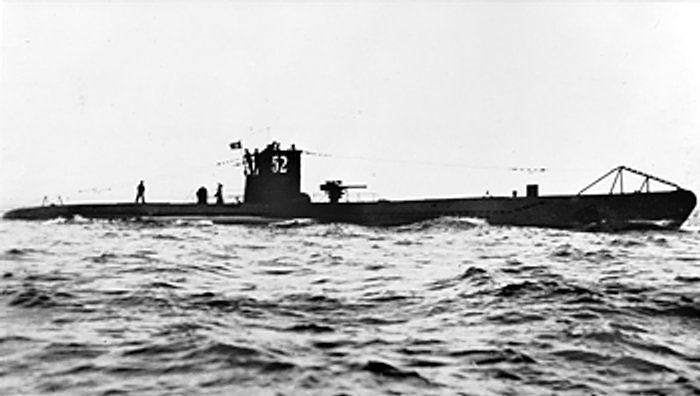
- U-52, a typical Type VIIB boat

History

Nazi Germany
- Name: U-75
- Ordered: 2 June 1938
- Builder: Bremer Vulkan, Bremen-Vegesack
- Cost: 4,790,000 Reichsmark
- Yard number: 3
- Laid down: 15 December 1939
- Launched: 18 October 1940
- Commissioned: 19 December 1940
- Fate: Sunk, 28 December 1941

General characteristics
- Class & type: Type VIIB U-boat
- Displacement: 753 t (741 long tons) surfaced; 857 t (843 long tons) submerged
- Length: 66.50 m (218 ft 2 in) o/a; 48.80 m (160 ft 1 in) pressure hull
- Beam: 6.20 m (20 ft 4 in) o/a; 4.70 m (15 ft 5 in) pressure hull
- Draught: 4.74 m (15 ft 7 in)
- Installed power: 2,800–3,200 PS (2,100–2,400 kW; 2,800–3,200 bhp) (diesels); 750 PS (550 kW; 740 shp) (electric)
- Propulsion: 2 shafts; 2 × diesel engines; 2 × electric motors
- Speed: 17.9 knots (33.2 km/h; 20.6 mph) surfaced; 8 knots (15 km/h; 9.2 mph)
- Range: 8,700 nmi (16,100 km; 10,000 mi) at 10 knots (19 km/h; 12 mph) surfaced; 90 nmi (170 km; 100 mi) at 4 knots (7.4 km/h; 4.6 mph) submerged
- Test depth: 230 m (750 ft); Calculated crush depth: 250–295 m (820–968 ft)
- Boats & landing craft carried: 1 inflatable rubber boat
- Complement: 4 officers, 40 to 56 enlisted
- Sensors & processing systems: FuMO 61 Hohentwiel U; Gruppenhorchgerät
- Armament: 5 × 53.3 cm (21 in) torpedo tubes (four bow, one stern); 14 × torpedoes or 26 TMA mines; 1 × 8.8 cm (3.46 in) deck gun (220 rounds); 1 × 2 cm (0.79 in) C/30 anti-aircraft gun

Service record
- Part of: 7th U-boat Flotilla; 19 December 1940 – 1 October 1941; 23rd U-boat Flotilla; 1 October – 28 December 1941
- Identification codes: M 16 800
- Commanders: Kptlt. Helmuth Ringelmann; 19 December 1940 – 28 December 1941
- Operations: 5 patrols: 1st patrol: 10 April – 12 May 1941; 2nd patrol: 29 May – 3 July 1941; 3rd patrol: 29 July – 25 August 1941; 4th patrol: 27 September – 2 November 1941; 5th patrol: 22 – 28 December 1941
- Victories: 7 merchant ships sunk (37,884 GRT); 2 warships sunk (744 tons)

German submarine U-75 was a Type VIIB U-boat of Nazi Germany's Kriegsmarine during World War II. U-75 was moderately successful in her early career in the Battle of the Atlantic, but in autumn 1941 she was dispatched to the Mediterranean Sea with poor results, leading to the eventual destruction of the boat and her crew.

== Design ==
German Type VIIB submarines were preceded by the shorter Type VIIA submarines. U-75 had a displacement of 753 tonnes (741 long tons) when at the surface and 857 tonnes (843 long tons) while submerged. She had a total length of 66.50 m (218 ft 2 in), a pressure hull length of 48.80 m (160 ft 1 in), a beam of 6.20 m (20 ft 4 in), a height of 9.50 m (31 ft 2 in), and a draught of 4.74 m (15 ft 7 in). The submarine was powered by two MAN M 6 V 40/46 four-stroke, six-cylinder supercharged diesel engines producing a total of 2,800 to 3,200 metric horsepower (2,060 to 2,350 kW; 2,760 to 3,160 shp) for use while surfaced, two BBC GG UB 720/8 double-acting electric motors producing a total of 750 metric horsepower (550 kW; 740 shp) for use while submerged. She had two shafts and two 1.23 m (4 ft) propellers. The boat was capable of operating at depths of up to 230 metres (750 ft).

The submarine had a maximum surface speed of 17.9 knots (33.2 km/h; 20.6 mph) and a maximum submerged speed of 8 knots (15 km/h; 9.2 mph). When submerged, the boat could operate for 90 nautical miles (170 km; 100 mi) at 4 knots (7.4 km/h; 4.6 mph); when surfaced, she could travel 8,700 nautical miles (16,100 km; 10,000 mi) at 10 knots (19 km/h; 12 mph). U-75 was fitted with five 53.3 cm (21 in) torpedo tubes (four fitted at the bow and one at the stern), fourteen torpedoes, one 8.8 cm (3.46 in) SK C/35 naval gun, 220 rounds, and one 2 cm (0.79 in) anti-aircraft gun The boat had a complement of between forty-four and sixty.

== Service history ==
She was laid down on 15 December 1939 at the Bremer Vulkan-Vegesacker Werft (yard), in Bremen as yard number 3, launched on 18 October 1940 and commissioned on 19 December under the command of Kapitänleutnant (Kptlt.) Helmuth Ringelmann.

U-75 carried out training with the 7th U-boat Flotilla on 19 December 1940 until 31 March 1941. She then became operational with the same organization until October. After that, she was reassigned to the 23rd flotilla.

=== First patrol ===
Ringelmann was a good sea officer, who made an impact within three weeks of the boat's initial patrol starting, when on 29 April the submarine torpedoed and sank the 10,146 GRT liner City of Nagpur in the Central North Atlantic Ocean, killing fifteen sailors and one passenger.

=== Second and third patrols ===
This success was followed on her second foray with another victim, this time a Dutch freighter, the Elbergen, which went down about 650 nautical miles (1,200 km) north of the Azores. As the Germans watched her demise, the U-boat was illuminated by a searchlight which was hurriedly extinguished by fire from the boat's AA gun.

On her third patrol U-75 sank two British cargo ships, the Harlingen and the Cape Rodney, both west of Ireland on 5 August 1941. The latter ship was taken in tow after being hit, but foundered west of Ushant on the ninth. These operations were conducted from the new submarine base at Saint-Nazaire in France, which provided type VII boats like U-75 with a greater patrol range and cruising ability, thus conferring an essential advantage.

=== Fourth patrol ===
The boat's fourth patrol was more unusual, requiring her to slip unnoticed through the heavily defended Strait of Gibraltar and into the Mediterranean to attack allied shipping operating from Gibraltar, Malta and Egypt. She was accompanied in this task by U-79, U-97, U-331, U-371 and U-559, which together formed the 'Goeben' group, (so-named for the German battleship of the same name which had operated in the Mediterranean in 1914). For these operations, U-75's home base was now Salamis in Greece, where she arrived on 2 November. On the journey there, the boat had taken a successful detour along the Libyan coast to see if she could catch any British resupply convoys. On 12 October she had seen just such a convoy and managed to sink two landing craft with gunfire before she escaped.

=== Fifth patrol and loss ===
Her final patrol was from 22 December 1941, and consisted of a similar sweep along the Libyan coast. On 28 December, six days since leaving Salamis, a small coastal convoy was spotted off Mersa Matruh, U-75 launched an attack which sank the small British freighter Volo. The convoy's escorts had spotted the U-boat, however, and HMS Kipling ran the submarine down and dropped depth charges on the boat. The explosions forced U-75 to the surface, where 30 of her crew were rescued and taken prisoner by her erstwhile opponent before the boat heeled over and sank, taking 15 men with her, including her only captain.

=== Wolfpacks ===
U-75 took part in two wolfpacks, namely:

- West (2 – 20 June 1941)
- Goeben (27 September – 5 October 1941)

== Summary of raiding history ==
| Date | Ship | Nationality | Tonnage (Note: Merchant ship tonnages are in gross register tons. Military vessels are listed by tons displacement.) | Fate |
|---|---|---|---|---|
| 29 April 1941 | City of Nagpur | United Kingdom | 10,146 | Sunk |
| 3 June 1941 | Eibergen | Netherlands | 4,801 | Sunk |
| 3 June 1941 | Inversuir | United Kingdom | 9,456 | Sunk |
| 25 June 1941 | Schie | Netherlands | 1,967 | Sunk |
| 5 August 1941 | Cape Rodney | United Kingdom | 4,512 | Sunk |
| 5 August 1941 | Harlingen | United Kingdom | 5,415 | Sunk |
| 12 October 1941 | HMS TLC-2 (A2) | Royal Navy | 372 | Sunk |
| 12 October 1941 | HMS TLC-7 (A7) | Royal Navy | 372 | Sunk |
| 28 December 1941 | Volo | United Kingdom | 1,587 | Sunk |

== See also ==
- Mediterranean U-boat Campaign (World War II)

== Bibliography ==
- Busch, Rainer; Röll, Hans-Joachim (1999). German U-boat commanders of World War II : a biographical dictionary. Translated by Brooks, Geoffrey. London, Annapolis, Md: Greenhill Books, Naval Institute Press. ISBN 1-55750-186-6.
- Busch, Rainer; Röll, Hans-Joachim (1999). Der U-Boot-Krieg, 1939-1945: Deutsche U-Boot-Verluste von September 1939 bis Mai 1945 [German U-boat losses from September 1939 to May 1945] (in German). Vol. IV. Hamburg, Berlin, Bonn: Mittler. ISBN 3-8132-0514-2.
- Gröner, Eric; Jung, Dieter; Maass, Martin (1991). German Warships 1815-1945: U-boats and Mine Warfare Vessels. Vol. 2. Translated by Thomas, Keith; Magowan, Rachel. London: Conway Maritime. ISBN 0-85177-593-4.
- Gröner, Erich (1990). German Warships, 1815-1945. Conway Maritime Press.
- Sharpe, Peter (1998). U-Boat Fact File. Great Britain: Midland Publishing. ISBN 1-85780-072-9.
