= SS Lesbian (1923) =

Cargo ship

- SS Lesbian

History
- Name: Lesbian
- Namesake: Lesbians
- Owner: Ellerman Lines Ltd (1923–40); Vichy French Government (1940–41)
- Operator: Ellerman Lines Ltd (1923–36); Ellerman & Papayanni Lines Ltd (1937–40); Vichy French Government (1940–41)
- Port of registry: (United Kingdom) Liverpool (1923–40); Vichy France (1940–41)
- Builder: Swan, Hunter & Wigham Richardson Ltd, Newcastle upon Tyne
- Yard number: 1211
- Launched: 31 July 1923
- Identification: UK Official Number 147232; Code Letters KPNH (1923–33); GJXK (1933–40)
- Fate: Scuttled 14 July 1941

General characteristics
- Tonnage: 2,352 GRT
- Length: 272 ft 1 in (82.93 m)
- Beam: 41 ft 7 in (12.67 m)
- Depth: 19 ft 9 in (6.02 m)
- Propulsion: 1 x triple expansion steam engine (Wallsend Slipway Co, Newcastle upon Tyne) 274 hp (204 kW)
- Speed: 10 knots (19 km/h)

Lesbian was a 2,352 GRT cargo ship which was built by Swan, Hunter and Wigham Richardson Ltd, Newcastle upon Tyne in 1923 for Ellerman Lines Ltd. She was seized in 1940 by the Vichy French forces.

== History ==
Lesbian was built by Swan, Hunter and Wigham Richardson Ltd as yard number 1211. She was launched on 31 July 1923 and completed in September 1923. Lesbian was the third Ellerman Lines ship to bear that name. She was named after the inhabitants of Lesbos, Greece.

On 24 May 1925, Lesbian ran aground at Kephez, Turkey. She was refloated on 27 May 1925.

Lesbian was operated by Ellerman Lines Ltd until 1937. From 1937 until her capture in 1940, Lesbian was operated under the management of Ellerman & Papayanni Lines Ltd.

=== War service ===
Lesbian was a member of a number of convoys during the Second World War.

OG 1

Lesbian was a member of Convoy OG 1, which formed at sea on 2 October 1939 and was destined for Gibraltar. She was carrying a general cargo bound for Piraeus, Greece.

HG 7

Lesbian was a member of Convoy HG 7, which departed Port Said, Egypt on 3 November 1939 and arrived at Liverpool on 22 November. She was carrying a general cargo and also fruit.

HG 17

Lesbian was a member of Convoy HG 17, which departed Gibraltar on 1 February 1940 and arrived at Liverpool on 11 May. She was on a voyage from Alexandria, Egypt to Liverpool.

HGF 28

Lesbian was a member of Convoy HGF 28, which departed Gibraltar on 26 April 1940 and arrived at Liverpool on 5 May.

=== Capture, sinking and rediscovery ===
In 1940, Lesbian was impounded by Vichy French forces at Beirut, Lebanon. During the Allied invasion of Syria and Lebanon in 1941, Beirut was bombed. The Vichy French, fearing that she would be sunk and block the port, took Lesbian a short distance offshore and scuttled her on 14 July 1941.

In 2000 the ship was discovered by two local diving centres, the National Institute for Scuba Diving (NISD) and the Abyss Dive Center. The ship is very well preserved and sitting at a depth of 67 metres (220 ft), facing Beirut port.

== Propulsion ==
Lesbian was powered by a triple expansion steam engine of 274 horsepower (204 kW) which was built by Wallsend Slipway Co Ltd, Newcastle upon Tyne. The cylinders were 18, 31½ and 54 inches (457, 800 and 1,372 mm) diameter by 36 inches (910 mm) stroke. She could make 10 knots (19 km/h).

== Official number and code letters ==
Official Numbers were a forerunner to IMO Numbers.

Lesbian had the UK Official Number 147232 and used the Code Letters KPNH until 1933 and GJXK until 1940.
