= List of shipwrecks in the Atlantic Ocean =

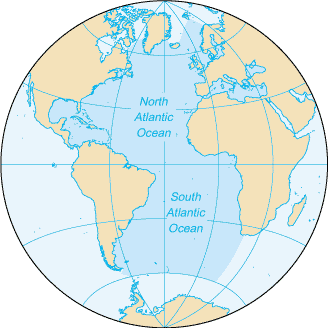
The Atlantic Ocean, not including Arctic and Antarctic regions

This is a partial list of shipwrecks which occurred in the Atlantic Ocean. The list includes ships that sank, foundered, grounded, or were otherwise lost. The Atlantic Ocean is here defined in its widest sense, to include its marginal seas: the Baltic Sea, the Black Sea, the Caribbean Sea, the Gulf of Mexico, the English Channel, the Labrador Sea, the Mediterranean Sea, the mid-Atlantic Ocean, the North Sea, the North Channel, the Norwegian Sea, and the waters of West Africa.

== Baltic Sea ==
Ship	Flag	Sunk date	Notes	Coordinates
Aura II	Finnish Navy	13 January 1940	A Finnish escort vessel that was sunk by its own depth charge north of Märket Island.	60°23′N 19°10′E
SMS Bremen	Imperial German Navy	17 December 1915	A Bremen-class light cruiser which struck two mines.	57°31′N 020°24′E
Cap Arcona	Germany	3 May 1945	A German prison ship that was bombed by Royal Air Force Typhoon aircraft, resulting in the deaths of over 4,000 prisoners of war.	54°3.9′N 10°50.45′E
HMS Cassandra	Royal Navy	5 December 1918	A C-class light cruiser that struck a mine in the Gulf of Finland near Saaremaa, Estonia.	
Estonia	Estonia	28 September 1994	An Estonian cruise ferry that sank during a storm, claiming 852 lives.	59°23′N 21°42′E
SMS Friedrich Carl	Imperial German Navy	17 November 1914	A Prinz Adalbert-class armored cruiser that struck two mines 33 nautical miles (61 km; 38 mi) west of Memel.	
HMS Gentian	Royal Navy	15 July 1919	An Arabis-class sloop that struck a mine in the Gulf of Finland east of Saaremaa, Estonia, on either 15 or 16 July 1919, according to different sources.	
Goya	Germany	16 April 1945	A German transport ship torpedoed by L-3, with thousands of German civilians and wounded soldiers on board.	55.200°N 18.300°E
Graf Zeppelin	Soviet Navy	16 August 1947	A Graf Zeppelin-class aircraft carrier that never saw service in World War II, and was sunk as a target north of Władysławowo, Poland.	55°31′03″N 18°17′09″E
Ilmarinen	Finnish Navy	13 September 1941	A Väinämöinen-class coastal defence ship that was sunk by mines.	59°27′N 21°05′E
Jan Heweliusz	Poland	14 January 1993	A Polish ferry that capsized in hurricane-force winds off Cape Arkona, Germany.	54°36′N 14°13′E
Koral	Soviet Navy	11 January 1945	An M57-class minesweeper that sank 35 kilometres (19 nmi) from Tallinn, Estonia.	
Ladoga	Imperial Russian Navy	15 August 1915	A minelayer, formerly the armored cruiser Minin, sunk by a mine.	
Lefort	Imperial Russian Navy	22 September 1857	A Russian ship of the line that capsized in the Gulf of Finland.	59°57′N 27°17′E
HMS Myrtle	Royal Navy	15 July 1919	An Azalea-class sloop that struck a mine in the Gulf of Finland east of Saaremaa, Estonia, on either 15 or 16 July 1919, according to different sources.	
Oleg	Soviet Navy	17 June 1919	A Bogatyr-class protected cruiser torpedoed by the British coastal motor boat CMB-4 at Kronstadt.	60°01′30″N 029°32′00″E
Pallada	Imperial Russian Navy	11 October 1914	A Bayan-class armored cruiser that was torpedoed by U-26.	59.6083°N 22.8167°E
Park Victory	United States	24 December 1947	A Victory ship that was grounded after a storm.	
SMS Prinz Adalbert	Imperial German Navy	23 October 1915	A Prinz Adalbert-class armored cruiser that was torpedoed by the British submarine HMS E8 about 20 nautical miles (37 km; 23 mi) west of Libau in the Russian Empire.	56°33′N 20°18′E
Rusalka	Imperial Russian Navy	7 September 1893	An ironclad warship that sank in the Gulf of Finland.	
S2	Finnish Navy	4 October 1925	A S-class torpedo boat that sank in a storm in the Bothnian Sea off Reposaari, Finland.	
SMS S31	Imperial German Navy	19 August 1915	A V25-class torpedo boat sunk by a mine near Ruhnu in the Gulf of Riga during the Battle of the Gulf of Riga.	
Sivuch	Imperial Russian Navy	19 August 1915	A Gilyak-class gunboat sunk by the Imperial German Navy battleships Nassau and Posen in the Gulf of Riga during the Battle of the Gulf of Riga.	
Slava	Imperial Russian Navy	17 October 1917	A Borodino-class battleship scuttled near Muhu during the Battle of Moon Sound.	58°40′43″N 23°21′19″E
U-7	Kriegsmarine	18 February 1944	A Type IIB U-boat that sank west of Baltiysk, Kaliningrad Oblast.	54°52′00″N 19°29′08″E
U-416	Kriegsmarine	12 December 1944	A Type VIIC U-boat that collided with German warship M 203 northwest of Pillau, Russia.	54°58′N 19°33′E
U-583	Kriegsmarine	15 November 1941	A Type VIIC U-boat that collided with U-153 north of Łeba, Poland.	55°23′N 17°05′E
U-649	Kriegsmarine	24 February 1943	A Type VIIC U-boat that sank in a collision with U-232 northwest of Łeba, Poland.	55°15′N 17°15′E
U-676	Kriegsmarine	12 February 1945	A Type VIIC U-boat that was sunk by mine in the Gulf of Finland.	59°30′N 23°0′E
U-3519	Kriegsmarine	2 March 1945	A Type XXI U-boat that was sunk by a mine off Warnemünde, Germany.	54°11′N 12°05′E
SMS Undine	Imperial German Navy	7 November 1915	A Gazelle-class light cruiser that was torpedoed by HMS E19 about 20 nautical miles (37 km) south of Scania, Sweden.	
Vasa	Swedish Navy	10 August 1628	A Swedish warship that capsized at Stockholm, Sweden, less than 1 nautical mile (1.9 km) into its maiden voyage. The wreck was raised in 1961, and now rests in the Vasa Museum.	59°19′40″N 18°05′28″E
HMS Verulam	Royal Navy	4 September 1919	An Admiralty V-class destroyer that struck a mine off Seiskari in the Gulf of Finland.	60°1′N 28°22′E
HMS Vittoria	Royal Navy	31 August 1919	An Admiralty V-class destroyer that was torpedoed by Pantera off Seiskari in the Gulf of Finland.	60°5′N 28°23′E
SMS Wacht	Imperial German Navy	4 September 1901	A Wacht-class aviso that collided with SMS Sachsen east of Cape Arkona, Germany.	54.6833°N 13.5167°E
ORP Wicher	Polish Navy	3 September 1939	A Wicher-class destroyer that was sunk by German bomber aircraft. The wreck was later towed to the area off Jastarnia, Poland.	54°40′N 18°32′E
Wilhelm Gustloff	Germany	30 January 1945	A German cruise ship that was torpedoed by S-13 during Operation Hannibal, killing an estimated 9,400 people, nearly all of whom were civilians.	55.0729°N 17.4213°E

== Bay of Biscay ==
Ship	Flag	Sunk date	Notes	Coordinates
Achille	French Navy	18 June 1940	A Redoutable-class submarine scuttled at Brest, France, to prevent her capture by advancing German ground forces during the Battle of France.	
Agosta	French Navy	18 June 1940	A Redoutable-class submarine scuttled at Brest, France, to prevent her capture by advancing German ground forces during the Battle of France.	
Arendskerk	Netherlands	15 January 1940	A merchant ship that was sunk after being torpedoed and later shelled by U-44.	46°55′N 06°34′W
Ariete	Spanish Navy	25 February 1966	An Audaz-class destroyer wrecked on the coast of Galicia in Spain.	
B-2	Spanish Navy	28 November 1951	The decommissioned B-class submarine sank in a storm in the Cantabrian Sea off the northern coast of Spain while under tow to a shipbreaker.	
B-6	Spanish Navy	19 September 1936	The B-class submarine sank off Cabo de Peñas, Spain, after exchanging gunfire with and surrendering to the destroyer Velasco and armed tug (or armed trawler) Galicia (both Nationalist Spain), either due to damage inflicted by gunfire or because she was scuttled by her crew to prevent capture.	
Berenice	Netherlands	21 June 1940	A merchant ship torpedoed by the German submarine U-65.	47°10′N 03°35′W
C-5	Spanish Navy	31 December 1936	A C-class submarine that disappeared after departing Bilbao, Spain.	
C-6	Spanish Navy	20 October 1937	A C-class submarine scuttled off Gijón, Spain. Refloated in November 1947 but sank again.	
C-6	Spanish Navy	November 1947	The wreck of a C-class submarine that sank again off Gijón, Spain, while under tow after being refloated.	
Dupetit-Thouars	French Navy	7 August 1918	A Gueydon-class armored cruiser torpedoed by the Imperial German Navy submarine U-62 off Brest, France.	
Diane	French Navy	11 February 1918	A Diane-class submarine sunk by an accidental internal explosion off La Pallice, France.	
España	(Spain) Spanish Republican Navy	30 April 1937	An España-class battleship sunk by a mine near Santander, Spain.	43°31′26″N 003°40′44″W
France	French Navy	26 August 1922	An Courbet-class battleship wrecked on an uncharted rock while entering Quiberon Bay on the coast of France.	47°27′06″N 003°02′00″W
Gueydon	French Navy	13 August 1944	A hulked Gueydon-class armored cruiser sunk by Royal Air Force aircraft at Brest France.	
Infernet	French Navy	16 November 1910	A decommissioned D'Estrées-class protected cruiser wrecked off Les Sables-d'Olonne, France, while under tow to ship breakers.	
Kléber	French Navy	27 June 1917	A Dupleix-class armored cruiser sunk by a mine off the Iroise entrance to Brest, France.	
Neion	Greece	22 June 1940	A merchant ship that was sunk after being torpedoed by U-38.	47°09′N 04°17′W
HMS Serpent	Royal Navy	10 November 1890	An Archer-class torpedo cruiser wrecked on the northwestern coast of Spain off Cape Vilan.	
U-621	Kriegsmarine	18 August 1944	A Type VIIC U-boat that was sunk by depth charges dropped by three Royal Canadian Navy destroyers, HMCS Ottawa, HMCS Kootenay and HMCS Chaudiere near La Rochelle	45°52′N 02°36′W
U-1222	Kriegsmarine	11 July 1944	A Type IXC/40 U-boat that was sunk by a British aircraft.	46°31′N 5°29′W

== Black Sea ==
Ship	Flag	Sunk date	Notes	Coordinates
Admiral Nakhimov	Soviet Union	31 August 1986	An ocean liner that collided with the Soviet cargo ship Pyotr Vasev in Tsemes Bay.	44°36′15″N 37°52′35″E
Armenia	Soviet Navy	7 November 1941	A hospital ship sunk by German aircraft with at least 5,000 deaths.	44°15′N 34°17′E
Carlo Alberto Racchia	Regia Marina	21 July 1920	A Mirabello-class scout cruiser that struck a mine and sank 9 nautical miles (17 km; 10 mi) in 11 metres (36 ft) of water southwest of Cape Fontana and 19 nautical miles (35 km; 22 mi) from Odesa.	
Moskva	Russian Navy	14 April 2022	A guided missile cruiser that sank after being hit by Ukrainian missiles.	
Novocherkassak	Russian Navy	26 December 2023	An tank landing ship sunk off Crimea by Ukrainian forces from a missile strike near Feodosiya during the Russian invasion of Ukraine.	
Novorossiysk	Soviet Navy	29 October 1955	A Conte di Cavour-class battleship sunk by an explosion at Sevastopol in the Soviet Union.	44°37′07″N 033°32′08″E
Portugal	Imperial Russian Navy	30 March 1916	A Russian hospital ship torpedoed by U-33 off Rize Province, Turkey.	42°00′36″N 41°11′24″E
Struma	Panama	24 February 1942	A refugee ship torpedoed by Shch-213 with over 700 Romanian Jewish immigrants aboard.	41°23′N 29°13′E
Unirea	Romania	13 October 1982	An oil tanker that exploded 40 nautical miles (74 km) southeast of Kaliakra, Bulgaria.	

== Caribbean Sea ==
Ship	Flag	Sunk date	Notes	Coordinates
USCGC Acacia	United States Coast Guard	15 March 1942	A buoy tender sunk by gunfire by the German submarine U-161 about 80 nautical miles (92 mi; 150 km) southwest of Saint Kitts and Nevis .	16°17′N 063°44′W
Alegrete	Brazil	1 June 1942	A cargo ship torpedoed by the German submarine U-156 between St. Lucia and St. Vincent.	13°40′N 61°30′W
Almirante Oquendo	Spanish Navy	3 July 1898	An Infanta Maria Teresa-class armored cruiser beached and wrecked on the south coast of Cuba west of Santiago de Cuba after sustaining damage in combat against United States Navy warships during the Battle of Santiago de Cuba.	19°58′39″N 76°8′40″W
Amakura	United Kingdom	25 August 1942	A cargo ship that sunk after being torpedoed by U-558.	17°46′N 75°52′W
American	United States	11 June 1942	A merchant ship that was sunk after being torpedoed three times by U-504.	17°58′N 84°28′W
Ante Matkovic	Yugoslavia	19 June 1942	A merchant ship that was torpedoed by U-159.	12°05′N 72°30′W
Ardenvohr	United Kingdom	10 June 1942	A cargo ship that sunk after being torpedoed by U-68.	12°45′N 80°20′W
Arkansan	United States	16 June 1942	A merchant ship that was torpedoed by U-126.	12°07′N 62°51′W
Arriaga	Panama	23 June 1942	A tanker that was torpedoed by U-68.	13°08′N 72°16′W
Beatrice	United States	25 May 1942	A merchant ship that was torpedoed by U-558.	17°30′N 68°20′W
Blankaholm	Sweden	18 August 1942	A merchant ship that was torpedoed by U-533.	19°41′N 76°50′W
Brabant	Belgium	14 May 1942	A merchant ship that sank after being torpedoed by U-155.	11°32′N 62°43′W
British Consul	United Kingdom	19 August 1942	A tanker that was torpedoed by U-564 near Grenada.	11°58′N 62°38′W
Bruxelles	Belgium	9 June 1942	A merchant ship that sank after being torpedoed by U-502.	11°05′N 66°41′W
USS Caron	United States Navy	4 December 2002	A decommissioned Spruance-class destroyer sunk during explosives testing 75 nautical miles (139 km; 86 mi) south of Roosevelt Roads, Puerto Rico.	
Castilla	Honduras	7 June 1942	A merchant ship that was torpedoed by U-107.	20°15′N 83°18′W
Ceres	Netherlands	13 March 1943	A merchant ship that was torpedoed by U-68.	14°50′N 71°46′W
Christena	St. Kitts and Nevis	1 August 1970	An overloaded passenger ferry boat that sank crossing the channel between the islands of St. Kitts and Nevis, Leeward Islands	17°10′50″N 62°40′30″W
C.O. Stillman	Panama	4 June 1942	An oil tanker that was torpedoed by U-68 about 41 nautical miles (76 km) southwest of Isla de Mona, Puerto Rico.	17°30′N 68°20′W
Cristóbal Colón	Spanish Navy	3 July 1898	A Giuseppe Garibaldi-class armored cruiser beached and wrecked on the south coast of Cuba at the mouth of the Tarquino River after sustaining damage in combat against United States Navy warships during the Battle of Santiago de Cuba.	
USS Dorado	United States Navy	12 October 1943	A Gato-class submarine that was sunk north of Panama.	12°21′N 78°50′W
Empire Amethyst	United Kingdom	13 April 1942	A tanker that was torpedoed by U-154 southwest of Haiti.	17°40′N 74°50′W
Empire Buffalo	United Kingdom	6 May 1942	A cargo ship that was torpedoed by U-125 west of the Cayman Islands.	19°14′N 82°34′W
Empire Cloud	United Kingdom	21 August 1942	A cargo ship that was torpedoed by U-564 northeast of Trinidad.	10°54′N 62°10′W
Empire Cromwell	United Kingdom	28 November 1942	A cargo ship that was torpedoed by U-508 off Guyana.	9°00′N 58°30′W
Empire Explorer	United Kingdom	9 July 1942	A cargo ship that was torpedoed by U-575 northwest of Tobago.	11°40′N 60°55′W
Faja de Oro	Mexico	21 May 1942	An oil tanker that was torpedoed by U-106.	23°30′N 84°24′W
Flora	Netherlands	18 June 1942	A steam merchant that was sunk by U-159 after it was shelled.	11°55′N 72°36′W
Furor	Spanish Navy	3 July 1898	A Furor-class destroyer that exploded and sank off the south coast of Cuba just west of Cabanas Bay during the Battle of Santiago de Cuba.	
Gonçalves Dias	Brazil	24 May 1942	A merchant ship that was torpedoed by U-502.	16°09′N 70°00′W
Hector	Netherlands	24 May 1942	A merchant ship that was torpedoed by U-103.	19°50′N 81°53′W
Infanta Maria Teresa	Spanish Navy	3 July 1898	An Infanta Maria Teresa-class armored cruiser beached and wrecked on the south coast of Cuba just west of Punta Cabrera after sustaining damage in combat against United States Navy warships during the Battle of Santiago de Cuba. Later refloated, but wrecked again in the Bahamas on 1 November 1898.	
Jorge Juan	Spanish Navy	21 July 1898	A sloop sunk by United States Navy warships in Nipe Bay on the coast of Cuba during the Battle of Nipe Bay.	
Kahuku	United States	16 June 1942	A merchant ship that was torpedoed by U-126.	11°54′N 63°07′W
USS Kearsarge	United States Navy	2 February 1894	A screw sloop-of-war wrecked on Roncador Cay.	13°32′N 080°03′W
Melville E. Stone	United States	24 November 1943	A Liberty ship that was sunk by U-516 northwest of Cristóbal, Panama.	10°29′N 80°20′W
USS Memphis	United States Navy	29 August 1916	A Tennessee-class armored cruiser wrecked in the harbor at Santo Domingo in the Dominican Republic.	
USS Merrimac	United States Navy	2 June 1898	A collier sunk in the entrance to the harbor at Santiago de Cuba in Cuba during the Siege of Santiago de Cuba.	19°58′37″N 075°52′18″W
Norlantic	United States	13 May 1942	A cargo ship that was sunk by U-69 about 90 nautical miles (170 km) east of Bonaire.	14°2′N 83°13′W
USS O-5	United States Navy	28 October 1923	An O-class submarine that was sunk in a collision in Limon Bay on the coast of the Panama Canal Zone.	
Plutón	Spanish Navy	3 July 1898	A Audaz-class destroyer beached and wrecked on the south coast of Cuba just west of Cabanas Bay after sustaining damage in combat against United States Navy warships during the Battle of Santiago de Cuba.	
Poelau Roebiah	Netherlands	6 July 1943	A cargo liner that sank after being torpedoed by U-759.	17°56′N 75°57′W
Port Montreal	United Kingdom	10 June 1942	A merchant ship that sank after being torpedoed by U-68 178 miles (286 km) north of Cristóbal, Panama.	12°17′N 80°20′W
USS R-12	United States Navy	12 June 1943	An R-class submarine that sank accidentally.	24°24′30″N 81°38′30″W
Regent	Latvia	14 June 1942	A merchant ship that was sunk after being torpedoed by U-504. It would be one of 8 Latvian ships that continued to fly the flag of Latvia and did not return home after being invaded by the Soviet Union.	17°56′N 75°57′W
Reina Mercedes	Spanish Navy	5 July 1898	An Alfonso XII-class unprotected cruiser scuttled on the south coast of Cuba at the entrance to the harbor Santiago de Cuba during the Siege of Santiago de Cuba.	
Rotterdam	Netherlands	27 August 1942	A tanker that was sunk after being torpedoed by U-511.	18°09′N 74°38′W
Sally	Honduras	5 June 1942	A sailing ship that sank after it was shelled by U-159.	16°45′N 70°15′W
Stad Amsterdam	Netherlands	25 August 1942	A merchant ship that was sunk after being torpedoed by U-164.	16°39′N 73°15′W
Surcouf	Free French Naval Forces	18 February 1942	A submarine that sank 80 nautical miles (150 km; 92 mi) north of Cristóbal, Panama, possibly due to a collision with an American freighter.	10°40′N 79°32′W
USS Sylvan Arrow	United States Navy	28 May 1942	A tanker that was torpedoed by U-155 southwest of Grenada.	12°50′N 67°32′W
Tachirá	United States	12 July 1942	A merchant ship that was torpedoed by U-129.	18°15′N 81°45′W
USS Texan	United States Navy	11 March 1942	A cargo ship that was torpedoed off Cape San Antonio, Cuba.	21°34′N 76°28′W
Tuscaloosa City	United States	4 May 1942	A merchant ship that was torpedoed by U-125.	18°25′N 81°31′W
U-94	Kriegsmarine	28 August 1942	A Type VIIC U-boat that was sunk by HMCS Oakville off Haiti.	17°40′N 74°30′W
U-153	Kriegsmarine	13 July 1942	A Type IXC U-boat that was sunk by USS Lansdowne off Colón, Panama.	09°46′N 81°29′W
U-159	Kriegsmarine	28 July 1943	A Type IXC U-boat that was sunk by US aircraft south of Haiti.	15°57′N 68°30′W
U-359	Kriegsmarine	26 July 1943	A Type VIIC U-boat that was sunk by an American aircraft southwest of Haiti's Tiburon Peninsula.	18°06′N 75°00′W
U-654	Kriegsmarine	22 August 1942	A Type VIIC U-boat that was sunk by a US aircraft.	12°00′N 79°56′W
Valera	Panama	7 March 1944	A steam tanker that was sunk after being torpedoed and broken in two.	11°30′N 76°27′W
Vizcaya	Spanish Navy	3 July 1898	An Infanta Maria Teresa-class armored cruiser beached and wrecked on the south coast of Cuba west of Santiago de Cuba after sustaining damage in combat against United States Navy warships during the Battle of Santiago de Cuba.	
West Celina	United States	19 August 1942	A merchant ship that was sunk after being torpedoed by U-162 two times. It was carrying a variety of cargo which included: manganese ore, mica, rubber and even 250 monkeys on the ship's boat deck.	11°45′N 62°30′W
West Hardaway	United States	15 June 1942	A steam tanker that was sunk after being torpedoed three times by U-502.	11°50′N 62°15′W

== Gulf of Mexico ==
Ship	Flag	Sunk date	Notes	Coordinates
Albatross	United States	2 May 1961	A schooner that sank in a squall about 125 nautical miles (232 km) west of the Dry Tortugas, inspiring the film White Squall.	
Alcoa Puritan	United States	6 May 1942	A cargo ship that was torpedoed by U-507 off Port Eads, Louisiana.	28°35′N 88°22′W
Amatlan	Mexico	4 September 1942	A tanker that was torpedoed by U-171 about 60 miles off the coast of Tampico. Originally an Italian vessel prior to being seized by Mexico.	23°27′N 97°30′W
Baja California	Honduras	19 July 1942	A cargo ship that was torpedoed by U-84.	25°14′N 82°27′W
Bayard	Norway	6 July 1942	A merchant ship that was torpedoed by U-67 about 45 miles to the south of Pascagoula, Mississippi.	29°35′N 88°44′W
Benjamin Brewster	United States	10 July 1942	A tanker that was torpedoed by U-67.	29°05′N 90°05′W
Bosiljka	Yugoslavia	19 June 1942	A Yugoslavian cargo steamer that was sunk after hitting a US Navy mine.	24°57′N 81°57′W
Cadmus	Norway	1 July 1942	A merchant ship that sank after being torpedoed by U-129.	22°50′N 92°15′W
Carrabulle	United States	26 May 1942	A tanker that was torpedoed by U-106.	26°18′N 89°21′W
City of Everett	United States	11 October 1923	A whaleback steamship that foundered 120 nautical miles (220 km) off Florida.	
Cristóbal Colón	Spanish Navy	29 September 1895	A Velasco-class unprotected cruiser that was wrecked during a hurricane on Colorado Reef off the northwestern coast of Cuba near Mantua.	
Empire Mica	United Kingdom	29 June 1942	A steam tanker that sank after being torpedoed by U-67.	28°29′N 89°12′W
Gulfoil	United States	17 May 1942	A tanker that was torpedoed by U-506.	28°08′N 89°46′W
Gulfpenn	United States	13 May 1942	A tanker that was torpedoed by U-507.	28°29′N 89°12′W
Gundersen	Norway	2 July 1942	A Norwegian merchant ship that was torpedoed by U-107.	23°33′N 92°35′W
Halo	United States	20 May 1942	A tanker that was torpedoed by U-506.	28°42′N 90°08′W
Hamlet	Norway	27 May 1942	A tanker that was torpedoed by U-753.	28°25′N 91°00′W
USS Hatteras	United States Navy	11 January 1863	A sidewheel paddle gunboat sunk off Galveston, Texas, by the Confederate States Navy screw sloop-of-war CSS Alabama in the Action off Galveston Light.	
Heredia	United States	17 May 1942	A merchant ship that was torpedoed by U-506.	28°53′N 91°03′W
Holstein	Honduras	2 October 1992	A Honduran cargo ship that sank during a storm.	
J. W. Clise	United States	August 1940	A schooner that was caught in the 1940 Louisiana hurricane and sank south of Mobile, Alabama.	
Las Choapas	Mexico	27 June 1942	An oil tanker that was torpedoed by U-129 near Tecolutla.	20°15′N 96°20′W
USS Maine	United States Navy	15 February 1898	A warship, sometimes referred to as an armored cruiser and sometimes as a second-class battleship, sunk by an internal explosion at Havana, Cuba.	23°08′07″N 082°20′03″W
Moira	Norway	17 June 1942	A tanker that was torpedoed by U-158 off the coast of Corpus Christi, Texas.	25°35′N 96°20′W
Oaxaca	Mexico	26 July 1942	A merchant ship that was torpedoed by U-171.	28°23′N 96°08′W
Petronila	Spanish Navy	8 August 1863	A Petronila-class screw frigate that was wrecked at the entrance to the port of Mariel, Cuba.	
Rawleigh Warner	United States	23 June 1942	An oil tanker that was torpedoed by U-67 40 miles (64 km) to the south of South Pass, Louisiana.	28°53′N 89°15′W
San Blas	Panama	17 June 1942	A merchant ship that sank after being torpedoed by U-158.	25°26′N 95°33′W
USS Tacoma	United States Navy	16 January 1924	A Denver-class protected cruiser wrecked on Blanquilla Reef off Veracruz, Mexico.	
USS Tecumseh	United States Navy	5 August 1864	A Canonicus-class monitor sunk by a mine in the entrance to Mobile Bay on the coast of Alabama during the Battle of Mobile Bay.	30°13′54″N 088°01′33″W
Tuapase	Soviet Union	4 July 1942	A tanker that was torpedoed by U-129.	22°13′N 86°06′W
Tuxpam	Mexico	27 June 1942	An oil tanker that was torpedoed by U-129 near Tecolutla.	20°15′N 96°20′W
U-2513	United States Navy	7 October 1951	A German Type XXI U-boat, operated by the United States Navy from 1945 to 1949, sunk as a target	24°52′0.9″N 83°18′35.64″W
United States	United States	11 November 2026	An ocean liner scuttled as an artificial reef approximately 22 nautical miles (41 km; 25 mi) southwest of Destin-Fort Walton Beach, Florida, and 32 nautical miles (59 km; 37 mi) southeast of Pensacola Pass.	30°07.148′N 086°46.755′W (proposed site)
Virginia	United States	12 May 1942	A tanker that was torpedoed by U-171 while it was laying stopped 1.5 miles (2.4 km) miles from the Southwest Pass pilot buoy for the Mississippi River. The coordinates are for where the ship sank at. The shipwreck itself has been moving because of underwater mudflows and as a result the ship's movement is a source of scientific research on that matter.	28°53′N 89°29′W

== English Channel ==
Ship	Flag	Sunk date	Notes	Coordinates
HMS A3	Royal Navy	2 February 1912	An A-class submarine sunk 2 nautical miles (3.7 km; 2.3 mi) southwest of the East Princessa Buoy in the eastern Solent in a collision with the depot ship HMS Hazard. (See also 17 May 1912.)	
HMS A3	Royal Navy	17 May 1912	The refloated wreck of an A-class submarine sunk as a gunnery target in Weymouth Bay by the battleship HMS St. Vincent. (See also 2 February 1912.)	50°31.41′N 002°11.25′W
Ajax	Norway	22 February 1917	A cargo ship that was sunk by UC-17 30 nautical miles (56 km) north of Ushant.	
Akaroa	Norway	1 September 1917	A barque that was torpedoed by U-19	49°21′N 4°25′W
CSS Alabama	Confederate States Navy	19 June 1864	A screw sloop-of-war sunk off Cherbourg, France by the United States Navy screw sloop-of-war USS Kearsarge in the Battle of Cherbourg.	49°45′09″N 001°41′42″W
HMS Ariadne	Royal Navy	26 July 1917	A Diadem-class protected cruiser torpedoed off Beachy Head by the Imperial German Navy submarine UC-67.	50.655°N 000.291°E
HMS Blackwood	Royal Navy	16 June 1944	A Captain-class frigate that foundered under tow near Portland Bill, Dorset.	50°07′00″N 02°01′06″W
HMS Charybdis	Royal Navy	23 October 1943	A Dido-class light cruiser sunk by German torpedo boats in the Battle of Sept-Îles.	48°59′N 003°39′W
RMS Connaught	United Kingdom	3 March 1917	A steamship that was torpedoed by U-48 south of Selsey Bill.	
Courbet	French Navy	9 June 1944	A decommissioned Courbet-class battleship scuttled as a breakwater to form part of a Mulberry harbor off Sword Beach, Normandy, in support of the Normandy landings.	
HMS D3	Royal Navy	12 March 1918	A D-class submarine sunk in error by the French airship AT-0 off Fécamp, France.	
Donegal	United Kingdom	17 April 1917	A hospital ship that was torpedoed by UC-21.	50.26°N 1.00°W
ORP Dragon	Polish Navy	20 July 1944	A Danae-class light cruiser scuttled to form a breakwater for an artificial harbor on the coast of France near Courseulles.	
HMS Durban	Royal Navy	9 June 1944	A Danae-class light cruiser scuttled to form a breakwater for an artificial harbor on the coast of France in the Seine Bay off Ouistreham.	49°20′44″N 000°16′08″W
HMS Empress of India	Royal Navy	4 November 1913	A Royal Sovereign-class battleship sunk as a target by British warships in Lyme Bay on the southwestern coast of England.	50°29′42″N 002°57′54″W
Espagne	Belgium	25 December 1917	A cargo ship that was torpedoed by UC-71 near the Isle of Wight.	50°26′30″N 1°29′31″W
HMS Formidable	Royal Navy	1 January 1915	A Formidable-class battleship torpedoed by the Imperial German Navy submarine U-24 near the Isle of Portland.	50°13′N 003°04′W
HMS Foylebank	Royal Navy	5 July 1940	An anti-aircraft ship that sank in Portland Harbour on the coast of Dorset, England, a day after suffering heavy damage in a German dive bomber attack.	50°34′37″N 002°25′10″W
Glenartney	United Kingdom	18 March 1915	A cargo ship that was torpedoed by UC-34 south of Eastbourne, England.	50°36′N 0°25′E
HMS Gladiator	Royal Navy	25 April 1908	An Arrogant-class protected cruiser sunk in a collision with the American steamer St. Paul in the Needles off the Isle of Wight.	
SMS Grosser Kurfürst	Imperial German Navy	31 May 1878	A Preussen-class ironclad turret ship sunk in a collision with the German armored frigate SMS König Wilhelm off Folkestone, England.	51°00′36″N 001°09′39″E
HMS Hood	Royal Navy	4 November 1914	A decommissioned Royal Sovereign-class battleship scuttled as a blockship in Portland Harbour on the south coast of England.	50°34′09″N 002°25′16″W
HMS LCT-1074	Royal Navy	25 August 1944	A Mark 4-class landing craft tank that was torpedoed by U-764.	49°50′N 0°45′W
Léopoldville	Belgium	24 December 1944	A troopship torpedoed by the German submarine U-486 5 nautical miles (9.3 km; 5.8 mi) off Cherbourg, France, with the loss of 819 of the 2,374 people on board.	49°45′N 1°34′W
HMS Limbourne	Royal Navy	23 October 1943	A Hunt-class escort destroyer scuttled by the British destroyer HMS Rocket after suffering damage in combat with German torpedo boats during the Battle of Sept-Îles.	
USS LST-314	United States Navy	9 June 1944	A Mark 2-class landing craft tank that was sunk by German motor torpedo boats about 30 nautical miles (56 km; 35 mi) east of Cherbourg.	49°43′N 0°52′W
HMS Monarch	Royal Navy	21 January 1925	An Orion-class battleship sunk as a target by British aircraft and warships in Hurd's Deep in the English Channel, about 50 nautical miles (93 km; 58 mi) south of the Isles of Scilly.	
Ouse	United Kingdom	8 August 1940	A cargo ship that collided with Rye off Newhaven.	
Rye	United Kingdom	7 April 1918	A cargo ship that was torpedoed by UB-74.	49°57′N 0°07′W
HNLMS Sumatra	Royal Netherlands Navy	9 June 1944	A Java-class light cruiser scuttled to form a breakwater for an artificial harbor on the coast of France in the Seine Bay off Ouistreham.	
HMS Tiger	Royal Navy	2 April 1908	A C-class destroyer that collided with the British armoured cruiser HMS Berwick about 20 nautical miles (37 km; 23 mi) south of the Isle of Wight.	
U-212	Kriegsmarine	21 July 1944	A Type VIIC U-boat that was sunk by HMS Curzon and HMS Ekins south of Brighton, East Sussex.	50°27′N 00°13′W
U-275	Kriegsmarine	10 March 1945	A Type VIIC U-boat that was sunk by a mine off Beachy Head.	50°36′N 00°04′E
U-327	Kriegsmarine	27 February 1945	A Type VIIC/41 U-boat that was sunk by HMS Labuan and HMS Loch Fada southwest of Penzance, Cornwall.	49°46′N 05°47′W
U-671	Kriegsmarine	4 August 1944	A Type VIIC U-boat that was sunk by HMS Stayner and HMS Wensleydale.	50°23′N 00°06′E
U-672	Kriegsmarine	18 July 1944	A Type VIIC U-boat that came under attack from HMS Balfour and was scuttled.	50°3′N 2°30′W
U-678	Kriegsmarine	7 July 1944	A Type VIIC U-boat that was sunk by HMCS Ottawa, HMCS Kootenay and HMS Statice.	50°32′N 00°23′W
U-988	Kriegsmarine	29 June 1944	A Type VIIC U-boat that was sunk by British forces south of Salcombe, England.	49°37′N 03°41′W
UB-72	Imperial German Navy	12 May 1918	A Type UB III U-boat that was torpedoed by HMS D4.	50°8′N 2°41′W
UB-74	Imperial German Navy	26 May 1918	A Type UB III U-boat that was sunk by HMS Lorna west of the Isle of Portland, Dorset.	50°32′N 2°32′W
UB-78	Imperial German Navy	9 May 1918	A Type UB III U-boat that was sunk by Queen Alexandra north of Cherbourg.	49°49′N 1°30′W
UB-109	Imperial German Navy	29 August 1918	A Type UB III U-boat that was sunk by mine north of Calais.	51°3′N 1°44′E
HMS Wessex	Royal Navy	24 May 1940	A W-class destroyer that was sunk by German dive bombers northwest of Calais, France.	51°00′54″N 001°45′50″E

== Irish Sea ==
Ship	Flag	Sunk date	Notes	Coordinates
HMS Cochrane	Royal Navy	14 November 1918	A Warrior-class armoured cruiser wrecked in the Mersey Estuary.	
U-1024	Royal Navy	13 April 1945	A Type VIIC/41 U-boat that was captured by British ships northwest of Holyhead, Wales, and sank under tow the next day.	
U-1051	Kriegsmarine	26 January 1945	A Type VIIC U-boat that was sunk by British ships.	53°39′N 05°23′W
U-1172	Kriegsmarine	27 January 1945	A Type VIIC/41 U-boat that was sunk by British frigates east of Wexford, Ireland.	52°24′N 05°42′W

== Labrador Sea ==
Ship	Flag	Sunk date	Notes	Coordinates
USAT Dorchester	United States Army	3 February 1943	A troopship that was torpedoed by the German submarine U-223 south of Greenland.	59°22′N 48°42′W
USCGC Escanaba	United States Coast Guard	13 June 1943	A United States Coast Guard cutter sunk southwest of Greenland, probably by a mine.	60°50′N 52°0′W
Flynderborg	United Kingdom	3 November 1941	A merchant ship that was torpedoed by U-202 northeast of Notre Dame Bay, Newfoundland.	51°21′N 51°45′W
San Juan de Pasajes	Basques	December 1565	While sitting at anchor in Red Bay bay with other whaling ships, she broke her moorings during a storm, struck an island and sank with a full load of 1,000 casks of oil.	51°43′55″N 56°25′32″W

== Mediterranean Sea ==
Ship	Flag	Sunk date	Notes	Coordinates
HMS Abdiel	Royal Navy	10 September 1943	An Abdiel-class minelayer sunk by mines in the harbor at Taranto, Italy, during Operation Slapstick.	40°26′35″N 017°15′06″E
Achéron	French Navy	November 24, 1943	A Redoutable-class submarine sunk by American bomber aircraft at the Toulon Arsenal at Toulon, France, after her seizure by Germany.	
Actéon	French Navy	November 8, 1942	A Redoutable-class submarine depth-charged and sunk during Operation Torch by the British destroyer HMS Westcott off Arzew, Algeria.	36°48′N 000°59′W
HMAS AE2	Royal Australian Navy	April 30, 1915	An E-class submarine that was attacked by Sultanhisar and scuttled in the Sea of Marmara.	40.672371°N 28.075218°E
Almeria Lykes	United States	August 13, 1942	A Type C3 cargo ship that was attacked by Italian MAS torpedo boats and scuttled off Kelibia, Tunisia.	36°40′N 11°35′E
Almirante Ferrándiz	Spanish Navy	September 29, 1936	A Churruca-class destroyer sunk during the Spanish Civil War by the Nationalist heavy cruiser Canarias in the Battle of Cape Spartel.	36°14′47″N 4°38′30″W
Alose	French Navy	March 1918	A Naïade-class submarine sunk as a target off Fréjus, France.	
Alpagot	Ottoman Navy	September 30, 1911	An Akhisar-class torpedo boat sunk by gunfire by the Italian destroyers Artigliere and Corazziere in the harbor at Preveza during the Italo-Turkish War.	
Amalfi	Regia Marina	July 7, 1915	A Pisa-class armored cruiser that was torpedoed by the Imperial German Navy submarine UB-14 about 20 nautical miles (37 km) from Venice, Italy.	
Amiral Charner	French Navy	February 8, 1916	An Amiral Charner-class armored cruiser torpedoed by the Imperial German Navy submarine U-21 in the Eastern Mediterranean.	33°21′N 034°54′E
Amiral Magon	France	January 28, 1917	A troopship that was torpedoed by the Imperial German Navy submarine U-39 southwest of Peloponnese, Greece.	35.4900°N 20.0200°E
Angelo Bassini	Regia Marina	May 28, 1943	A torpedo boat — a former La Masa-class destroyer — sunk by United States Army Air Forces bombers while moored at Leghorn (Livorno), Italy.	
Antikythera wreck	Unknown	1st century BC	An ancient shipwreck discovered in October 1900 near the island of Antikythera. The wreck contained many artifacts and the world's oldest known analog computer, the Antikythera mechanism.	35.8897°N 23.3078°E
RMS Arabia	United Kingdom	November 6, 1916	A passenger liner that was torpedoed by UB-43 southwest of the Peloponnese, Greece.	36°30′N 20°30′E
Argonaute	French Navy	November 8, 1942	An Argonaute-class submarine depth-charged and sunk off Algeria east of Oran during Operation Torch by either the British destroyer HMS Achates, the British destroyer HMS Westcott, or both.	
Ariane	French Navy	June 19, 1917	An Amphitrite-class submarine torpedoed and sunk off Cape Bon, Tunisia by the Imperial German Navy submarine UC-22.	
Ariane	French Navy	November 9, 1942	An Ariane-class submarine scuttled at Oran, Algeria, during Operation Torch to prevent her capture by Allied forces.	
HMS Ark Royal	Royal Navy	November 14, 1941	A British aircraft carrier torpedoed by U-81 about 30 nautical miles (56 km) off Gibraltar.	36°3′N 4°45′W
Armando Diaz	Regia Marina	February 25, 1941	A Condottieri-class light cruiser torpedoed by HMS Upright off the Kerkennah Islands.	34°33′N 11°45′E
Arno	Regia Marina	September 10, 1940	A hospital ship sunk by British aircraft about 40 nautical miles (74 km) northeast of Tobruk, Libya.	33°14′N 23°23′E
HMS Arno	Royal Navy	March 23, 1918	A destroyer sunk in a collision with the British destroyer HMS Hope off the Dardanelles.	40°14′30″N 26°30′30″E
Artigliere	Regia Marina	October 13, 1940	A Soldati-class destroyer sunk by the British heavy cruiser HMS York during the Battle of Cape Passero.	
HMS Athenienne	Royal Navy	October 20, 1806	A 64-gun third-rate ship of the line that ran aground in the Strait of Sicily.	37°47′N 10°46′E
Athos	France	February 17, 1917	A cargo liner that was torpedoed by U-65.	35.3667°N 18.5333°E
Audace	Regia Marina	August 30, 1916	An Audace-class destroyer that sank after colliding with the steamer Brasile (Italy), a member of the convoy she was escorting, and sank in the Ionian Sea off Capo Colonna, Italy.	
Aurore	French Navy	November 27, 1942	An Aurore-class submarine scuttled at Toulon, France, to prevent her capture by German forces.	
Australien	France	July 19, 1918	A passenger ship that was sunk by UC-54 26 nautical miles (48 km) northeast of Cap Bon, Tunisia.	
B-1	Spanish Navy	1949	A decommissioned B-class submarine sunk as a target by Spanish destroyers in 50 metres (164 ft) of water in Alcúdia Bay on the northeastern coast of Mallorca in the Balearic Islands.	
B-5	Spanish Navy	October 1936	A B-class submarine that disappeared after departing Málaga in mid-October.	
Baleares	Spanish Nationalist Navy	March 6, 1938	A Canarias-class heavy cruiser sunk during the Spanish Civil War by the destroyer Lepanto (Spanish Republican Navy) in the Battle of Cape Palos.	37°52′18″N 0°52′00″E
HMS Barham	Royal Navy	November 25, 1941	A Queen Elizabeth-class battleship that was torpedoed by the German submarine U-331 north of Sidi Barrani, Egypt.	32°34′N 26°24′E
Barbaros Hayreddin	Ottoman Navy	August 8, 1915	A Brandenburg-class battleship that was torpedoed by the British submarine HMS E11 off Bolayır in the Sea of Marmara.	
Baron Gautsch	Austria-Hungary	August 13, 1914	A passenger ship that later became a troopship which sank after hitting a mine.	44°56.25′N 13°34.40′E
USS Beatty	United States Navy	November 6, 1943	A Gleaves-class destroyer that was sunk by German aircraft off Algeria.	37°10′N 6°0′E
HMS Bedouin	Royal Navy	June 15, 1942	A Tribal-class destroyer that was sunk by the combined action of Italian cruisers and torpedo bomber aircraft during Operation Harpoon.	36°12′0″N 11°38′0″E
Benedetto Cairoli	Regia Marina	April 10, 1918	A La Masa-class destroyer that sank in the Ionian Sea off Santa Maria di Leuca, Italy, after colliding with the Italian destroyer Giacinto Carini.	
Bernoulli	French Navy	February 13, 1918	A Brumaire-class submarine last heard from on 13 February 1918. Probably sank in the Adriatic Sea off Cattaro, Austria-Hungary, after striking a mine.	
HMS Blean	Royal Navy	December 11, 1942	A Hunt-class destroyer that was torpedoed by U-443 northwest of Oran, Algeria.	35°55′N 1°50′W
HMS Bonaventure	Royal Navy	March 31, 1941	A Dido-class light cruiser that was torpedoed by the Italian submarine Ambra south of Crete.	33°20′0″N 26°35′0″E
Borea	Regia Marina	May 15, 1917	A Nembo-class destroyer sunk by the Austro-Hungarian Navy destroyer Csepel in the Adriatic Sea during the Battle of the Strait of Otranto.	
Bouvet	French Navy	March 18, 1915	A battleship sunk by a mine in the southern entrance to the Dardanelles during the Dardanelles campaign.	40°01′15″N 026°16′30″E
Bretagne	French Navy	July 3, 1940	A Bretagne-class battleship sunk by British warships ay Mers El Kébir on the coast of Algeria during the attack on Mers-el-Kébir.	
HMHS Britannic	Royal Navy	November 21, 1916	An Olympic-class ocean liner (sister ship to RMS Titanic) operating as a hospital ship that struck a mine off the Greek island of Kea and sank with the loss of 30 lives.	37°42′05″N 24°17′02″E
HMS Broke	Royal Navy	November 8, 1942	A Thornycroft type flotilla leader that suffered heavy damage in Operation Terminal and later sank under tow.	36°50′N 0°40′E
USS Buck	United States Navy	October 9, 1943	A Sims-class destroyer that was torpedoed by U-616 off Salerno, Italy.	39°57′N 14°28′E
C-3	(Spain) Spanish Republican Navy	December 12, 1936	A C-class submarine torpedoed and sunk southeast of Málaga, Spain, by the German submarine U-34 during the Spanish Civil War.	36°40′N 04°21′W
C-4	Spanish Navy	June 27, 1946	A C-class submarine rammed accidentally by the Spanish destroyer Lepanto off Sóller on Mallorca in the Balearic Islands.	
HMS Cachalot	Royal Navy	July 30, 1941	A Grampus-class submarine that was rammed by the Italian torpedo boat Generale Achille Papa northwest of Tocra, Libya.	32°49′N 20°11′E
HMS Cairo	Royal Navy	August 12, 1942	A C-class light cruiser scuttled by gunfire by the escort destroyer HMS Derwent after being torpedoed by the Italian submarine Axum during Operation Pedestal.	37°26′0″N 10°22′0″E
HMS Calcutta	Royal Navy	June 1, 1941	A C-class light cruiser that was sunk by German bombers 100 nautical miles (190 km; 120 mi) off Alexandria, Egypt.	32°00′N 28°00′E
Calypso	French Navy	January 31, 1943	A Circé-class submarine sunk by American bomber aircraft at Ferryville, Tunisia, after her seizure by Germany and transfer to Italy.	
HMS Calypso	Royal Navy	June 12, 1940	A C-class light cruiser that was torpedoed by Alpino Bagnolini about 50 nautical miles (93 km) south of Cape Lithion, Crete.	34°03′N 24°05′E
Cameronia	United Kingdom	April 15, 1917	A troopship that was torpedoed by U-33 about 150 nautical miles (280 km) east of Malta.	35°50′N 17°32′E
Carlo Mirabello	Regia Marina	May 21, 1941	A Mirabello-class destroyer that struck a mine and was scuttled in the Ionian Sea off the Ionian Islands, 2 nautical miles (3.7 km; 2.3 mi) south of Lefkada.	
Carroccio	Kingdom of Italy	May 15, 1917	A cargo ship sunk by the Austro-Hungarian Navy destroyer Balaton in the Adriatic Sea during the Battle of the Strait of Otranto.	
Cávado	Portuguese Navy	November 29, 1921	A torpedo boat that sank in a storm off Morocco while under tow by the tug NRP Patrão Lopes (Portuguese Navy).	
Cesare Rossarol	Regia Marina	November 16, 1918	An Alessandro Poerio-class scout cruiser sunk by a mine in the Adriatic Sea 2 nautical miles (3.7 km; 2.3 mi) off Ližnjan on the coast of Istria.	44°49′50″N 13°59′15″E
Châteaurenault	French Navy	December 14, 1917	A protected cruiser torpedoed by the Imperial German Navy submarine UC-38 while entering the Gulf of Corinth.	
Chesterfield	United Kingdom	May 18, 1918	A cargo ship that was torpedoed by UC-52 southeast of Sicily.	36°17′N 15°13′E
City of Bradford	United Kingdom	February 22, 1942	A cargo ship that was sunk by German aircraft off Bardia, Libya.	31°57′N 25°26′E
Columbia	Denmark	August 1, 1918	A cargo ship carrying general cargo that was torpedoed by UC-34 near Port Said, Egypt.	38°43′N 8°44′E
Condorcet	French Navy	August 1944	The former Danton-class battleship, in use as a barracks ship, was scuttled by German forces at Toulon, France.	
Console Generale Liuzzi	Regia Marina	June 27, 1940	A Liuzzi-class submarine that was attacked by British destroyers and scuttled south of Crete.	33°46′0″N 27°27′0″E
HMS Cornwallis	Royal Navy	January 9, 1917	A Duncan-class battleship that was torpedoed by U-32 about 60 nautical miles (110 km) east of Malta.	35°06′N 015°11′E
Costa Concordia	Italy	January 13, 2012	A Concordia-class cruise ship wrecked after striking a rock in the Tyrrhenian Sea just off the eastern shore of Isola del Giglio, Italy.	
HMS Coventry	Royal Navy	September 14, 1942	A C-class light cruiser scuttled by the British destroyer HMS Zulu northwest of Alexandria, Egypt, after sustaining damage in a German air attack during Operation Agreement.	32°48′N 028°17′E
Curie	French Navy	December 20, 1914	A Brumaire-class submarine sunk by Austro-Hungarian Navy warships in the entrance to the harbor at Pola, Austria-Hungary.	
Danaé	French Navy	November 9, 1942	An Ariane-class submarine scuttled at Oran, Algeria, during Operation Torch to prevent her capture by Allied forces.	
Danton	French Navy	March 19, 1917	A Danton-class battleship that was torpedoed by U-64 about 22 nautical miles (41 km) southwest of Sardinia.	38°45′35″N 8°3′30″E
HMS Defender	Royal Navy	July 11, 1941	A D-class destroyer that was attacked by a German bomber aircraft and scuttled off Sidi Barrani, Egypt.	31°45′N 25°31′E
Delfino	Regia Marina	March 23, 1943	An Italian submarine that was scuttled after a collision east of the Strait of Gibraltar.	35°54′0″N 4°17′0″W
HMS Diamond	Royal Navy	April 27, 1941	A D-class destroyer that was sunk by German aircraft off Cape Maleas, Greece.	36°30′N 23°34′E
Diane	French Navy	November 9, 1942	A Diane-class submarine scuttled at Oran, Algeria, during Operation Torch to prevent her capture by Allied forces.	
Djemnah	France	July 14, 1918	A cargo liner that was torpedoed by UB-105 north of Tobruk, Libya.	33.2000°N 23.9167°E
Doris	French Navy	June 25, 1999	A decommissioned Daphné-class submarine which sank accidentally in 939 metres (3,081 ft) of water off France's Levant Island while being submerged for use as a target in a torpedo test.	43.1028333°N 006.5726667°E
HMHS Dover Castle	United Kingdom	May 26, 1917	A hospital ship that was torpedoed by UC-67 about 50 nautical miles (93 km) north of Annaba, Algeria.	37°45′00″N 007°45′00″E
TCG Dumlupınar	Turkish Navy	April 4, 1953	A Balao-class submarine sunk in a collision off Nara Burnu in the Dardanelles.	
Durbo	Regia Marina	October 18, 1940	An Italian Adua-class submarine that was attacked by British destroyers and scuttled east of Gibraltar.	35°54′0″N 4°17′0″W
HMS Eagle	Royal Navy	August 11, 1942	An aircraft carrier that was torpedoed by U-73 about 70 nautical miles (130 km) south of Cape Salinas, Majorca.	38°3′0″N 3°1′12.00″E
HMS Eclipse	Royal Navy	October 24, 1943	An E-class destroyer that hit a mine off Kalymnos, Greece.	37°01′N 27°11′E
Edgar Quinet	French Navy	January 4, 1930	An Edgar Quinet-class armored cruiser wrecked on the coast of Algeria west of Oran.	
El Amir Farouq	Egyptian Navy	October 22, 1948	The sloop was sunk by an Israeli Navy explosive motorboat off the Gaza Strip northwest of Gaza City.	
Emanuele Pessagno	Regia Marina	May 29, 1942	A Navigatori-class destroyer torpedoed in the Mediterranean Sea north-northwest of Benghazi, Libya, by the British submarine HMS Turbulent.	
Empire Dunstan	United Kingdom	November 18, 1943	A cargo ship that was torpedoed by U-81 off Taranto, Italy.	39°24′N 17°40′E
Empire Eve	Royal Navy	May 18, 1943	A CAM ship that was torpedoed by U-414 northeast of Mostaganem, Algeria.	36°37′N 00°46′E
HMT Empire Windrush	United Kingdom	March 30, 1954	A troopship that caught fire and sank 32 nautical miles (59 km) northwest of Cape Caxine, Algeria.	37°00′N 2°11′E
Enrico Cosenz	Regia Marina	September 27, 1943	A torpedo boat — a former La Masa-class destroyer — scuttled by her crew in the Adriatic Sea off Lastovo.	
Erinpura	United Kingdom	May 1, 1943	An ocean liner that was sunk by German bombers 30 nautical miles (56 km) north of Benghazi, Libya.	32°40′N 19°53′E
HMS Escort	Royal Navy	July 11, 1940	An E-class destroyer that was torpedoed by Guglielmo Marconi and later sank under tow.	36°6′35″N 3°22′12″W
España	Spanish Navy	August 26, 1923	An España-class battleship wrecked off Cape Three Forks near Melilla on the coast of North Africa.	
Eurydice (Q130)	French Navy	November 27, 1942	An Ariane-class submarine scuttled at Toulon, France, to prevent her seizure intact by Germany. After the Germans seized and refloated her, her hulk was sunk again by American bomber aircraft on 22 June 1944.	
Eurydice (S644)	French Navy	March 4, 1970	A Daphné-class submarine sunk by an accidental internal explosion while submerged off Cape Camarat, 35 nautical miles (65 km; 40 mi) east of Toulon, France.	
F14	Regia Marina	August 6, 1928	An F-class submarine sunk in a collision with the destroyer Giuseppe Missori in the Adriatic Sea off Pola, 7 nautical miles (13 km; 8.1 mi) west of the Brioni Islands.	
Faulx	French Navy	April 10, 1918	A Bouclier-class destroyer sunk in a collision with the French destroyer Mangini in the Strait of Otranto.	
HMS Fearless	Royal Navy	July 23, 1941	An E-class destroyer that was attacked by Italian aircraft and scuttled 50 nautical miles (93 km) northeast of Annaba, Algeria.	37°40′N 08°20′E
USS Fechteler	United States Navy	May 5, 1944	A Buckley-class destroyer escort torpedoed by the German submarine U-967.	36°7′N 2°40′W
Feth-i Bülend	Ottoman Navy	October 31, 1912	A Feth-i Bülend-class ironclad in use as a barracks ship torpedoed by the Greek torpedo boat No. 11 at Salonica during the First Balkan War.	
HMS Fiji	Royal Navy	May 22, 1941	A Fiji-class light cruiser sunk by German aircraft off Crete.	
Fiume	Regia Marina	March 29, 1941	A Zara-class heavy cruiser that was sunk by British battleships in the Battle of Cape Matapan.	35°21′N 20°57′E
Floréal	French Navy	August 2, 1918	A Pluviôse-class submarine sunk in a collision with the Royal Navy armed boarding steamer HMS Hazel in the Aegean Sea.	
Forfait	French Navy	July 21, 1875	A screw corvette sunk in a collision with the French ironclad central battery ship Jeanne d'Arc in the Tyrrhenian Sea off the east coast of Corsica.	
Foucault	French Navy	September 15, 1916	A Brumaire-class submarine scuttled in the Adriatic Sea off Cattaro, Austria-Hungary, after suffering damage in an attack by Austro-Hungarian Navy Lohner L flying boats. The first submarine sunk by aircraft.	
FR117	Regia Marina	May 6, 1943	A Circé-class submarine scuttled in the channel at Bizerte, Tunisia, to prevent her capture by advancing Allied forces.	
FR118	Regia Marina	September 9, 1943	A Redoutable-class submarine scuttled at Genoa, Italy, to prevent her capture by German forces.	
France IV	France	November 7, 1915	An ocean liner that was sunk by U-38 southeast of Sardinia.	38°08′N 9°54′E
Francesco Crispi	Italy	April 19, 1943	A passenger ship that was carrying soldiers which was torpedoed by HMS Saracen.	
Francesco Stocco	Regia Marina	September 24, 1943	A torpedo boat sunk by German aircraft in the Ionian Sea off Corfu.	
RMS Franconia	United Kingdom	October 4, 1916	A troopship that was torpedoed by UB-47 about 195 nautical miles (361 km) east of Malta.	35°33′9″N 18°26′0″E
Fratelli Cairoli	Regia Marina	December 23, 1940	A Rosolino Pilo-class destroyer sunk by a mine off Misrata Libya.	
Freccia	Regia Marina	October 12, 1911	A Lampo-class destroyer wrecked at the entrance to the harbor at Tripoli on the coast of Ottoman Tripolitania.	
Fresnel	French Navy	November 27, 1942	A Redoutable-class submarine scuttled at Toulon, France, to prevent her seizure intact by Germany. After the Germans seized her and handed her over to Italy, the Italians refloated her. She was sunk again in January 1943, refloated again, and then seized by the Germans before her hulk was sunk again by Allied aircraft on 11 March 1944.	
HMS Galatea	Royal Navy	December 14, 1941	An Arethusa-class light cruiser that was torpedoed by U-557 off Alexandria, Egypt.	31°17′N 29°13′E
Galatée	French Navy	November 27, 1942	A Sirène-class submarine scuttled at Toulon, France, to prevent her seizure intact by Germany. Refloated by Italy, then seized by Germany, her hulk was sunk again by Allied aircraft on 5 July 1944. she was refloated again and scuttled on 17 March 1949.	
Gallia	French Navy	October 4, 1916	A troopship torpedoed southwest of Sardinia by the Imperial German Navy submarine U-35.	38°27′N 007°30′E
Garibaldino	Regia Marina	July 16, 1918	A Soldato-class destroyer that sank off Villefranche-sur-Mer, France, after colliding with the British naval trawler HMT Cygnet.	
Gaulois	French Navy	December 27, 1916	A Charlemagne-class battleship that was torpedoed by the Imperial German Navy submarine UB-47 in the Sea of Crete off Cape Maleas, Greece.	36°30′N 23°45′E
Général Bonaparte	Vichy France	May 19, 1943	A passenger ship that was torpedoed by HMS Sportsman southeast of Nice, France.	43.0167°N 7.6667°E
Giacomo Medici	Regia Marina	April 16, 1943	A torpedo boat — a former La Masa-class destroyer — sunk by United States Army Air Forces bombers while moored at Catania, Sicily.	
Gisela L M Russ	Greece	February 19, 1959	A cargo ship that suffered a boiler explosion and sank off Euboea, Greece.	38°35′N 24°21′E
Giuseppe Garibaldi	Regia Marina	July 18, 1915	A Giuseppe Garibaldi-class armored cruiser torpedoed and sunk by the Austro-Hungarian Navy submarine U-4 in the Adriatic Sea southeast of Dubrovnik (Ragusa).	42°28.362′N 018°16.758′E
Giuseppe La Farina	Regia Marina	May 4, 1941	A torpedo boat — a former La Masa-class destroyer — sunk by a mine in the Mediterranean Sea off the Kerkennah Islands off the coast of Tunisia, with the loss of 61 of her 128 crew.	34°35′N 011°50′E
Giuseppe La Masa	Regia Marina	September 11, 1943	A torpedo boat — a former La Masa-class destroyer — scuttled by her crew at Naples, Italy.	
Giuseppe Sirtori	Regia Marina	September 25, 1943	A torpedo boat — a former Giuseppe Sirtori-class destroyer — scuttled by her crew in the Straits of Corfu after she was badly damaged by German aircraft and beached on 14 September 1943..	
Glenartney	United Kingdom	February 6, 1918	A cargo ship that was sunk by UC-54 30 nautical miles (56 km; 35 mi) northeast of Cape Bon, Tunisia.	
HMS Gloucester	Royal Navy	May 22, 1941	A Town-class light cruiser sunk by German dive bombers in Kythira Strait about 12 nautical miles (22 km; 14 mi) north of Crete.	35°50′N 023°00′E
HMS Goliath	Royal Navy	May 13, 1915	A Canopus-class battleship torpedoed by the Ottoman Navy destroyer Muavenet-i Milliye in Morto Bay on the coast of the Gallipoli Peninsula.	
HMS Grampus	Royal Navy	June 16, 1940	A Grampus-class submarine that was sunk by Italian torpedo boats.	37°5′N 17°30′E
HMS Grove	Royal Navy	June 12, 1942	A Hunt-class destroyer that was torpedoed by U-77.	32°5′N 25°30′E
HMS Gurkha	Royal Navy	January 17, 1942	An L-class destroyer that was torpedoed by U-133 off Sidi Barrani, Egypt.	31°50′N 26°15′E
Gustave Zédé	French Navy	February 26, 1976	A submarine tender that was sunk as a target ship south of Marseille.	42°30′N 5°24′E
HMS Hasty	Royal Navy	June 15, 1942	A H-class destroyer that was torpedoed by S-55 and scuttled the next day.	34°10′N 22°0′E
Henri Poincaré	French Navy	November 27, 1942	A Redoutable-class submarine scuttled at Toulon, France, to prevent her seizure intact by Germany. Refloated by Italy and renamed FR118.	
Heraklion	Greece	December 8, 1966	A car ferry that capsized northwest of Antimilos, Greece.	36°52′N 24°8′E
HMS Hermione	Royal Navy	June 16, 1942	A Dido-class light cruiser that was torpedoed by the German submarine U-205 north of Sallum, Egypt.	33°20′N 26°00′E
HMS Hyperion	Royal Navy	December 22, 1940	A H-class destroyer that struck a mine off Pantelleria and was scuttled.	37°40′N 11°31′E
HMS Hythe	Royal Navy	October 11, 1943	A Bangor-class minesweeper that was torpedoed by U-371 off Béjaïa, Algeria.	37°4′N 5°0′E
Ictíneo I	Spain	January 1862	A privately owned experimental submarine destroyed while berthed at Barcelona, Spain, when a cargo ship collided with her.	
Iéna	French Navy	March 12, 1907	A battleship wrecked by an internal explosion at Toulon, France. (See also 2 December 1909.)	
Iéna	French Navy	December 2, 1909	A hulked former battleship which sank near Porquerolles off the coast of France after use as a target. (See also 12 March 1907.)	
Impetuoso	Regia Marina	July 10, 1916	An Indomito-class destroyer torpedoed and sunk by the Austro-Hungarian Navy U-17 in the Strait of Otranto during the Adriatic Campaign of World War I.	40°10′N 018°50′E
Intrepido	Regia Marina	December 4, 1915	An Indomito-class destroyer that struck a mine in the Adriatic Sea off the coast of the Principality of Albania south of the Karaburun Peninsula during the Adriatic Campaign of World War I.	
HMS Irresistible	Royal Navy	March 18, 1915	A Formidable-class battleship sunk by a mine in the southern entrance to the Dardanelles during the Dardanelles campaign.	
HNLMS Isaac Sweers	Royal Netherlands Navy	November 13, 1942	A Gerard Callenburgh-class destroyer that was torpedoed by U-431 during Operation Torch.	37°23′N 2°12′E
Italia	Regia Marina	May 30, 1917	An armed boarding steamer that was torpedoed by U-4 about 46 nautical miles (85 km) southeast of Santa Maria di Leuca, Italy.	
Ivernia	United Kingdom	January 1, 1917	A troopship that was torpedoed by UB-47 about 58 nautical miles (107 km) southeast of Cape Matapan, Greece.	35°42′N 23°19′E
HMS Jackal	Royal Navy	May 12, 1942	A J-class destroyer that was attacked by German bombers and scuttled the next day, north of Sidi Barrani, Egypt.	36°30′N 26°30′E
HMS Jaguar	Royal Navy	March 26, 1942	A J-class destroyer that was torpedoed by U-652 north of Sidi Barrani, Egypt.	31°53′N 26°18′E
Jaime I	(Spain) Spanish Republican Navy	June 17, 1937	An España-class battleship sunk by an accidental internal explosion at Cartagena, Spain.	
HMS Juno	Royal Navy	May 21, 1941	A J-class destroyer that was sunk by Italian aircraft southeast of Crete.	34°35′N 26°34′E
Jupiter	Greece	October 21, 1988	A cruise ship sunk in a collision off Piraeus, Greece.	37.9250°N 23.6083°E
HMS Kandahar	Royal Navy	December 20, 1941	A K-class destroyer that struck a mine and was scuttled north of Khoms, Libya.	32°57′0″N 14°19′0″E
Kenkoku Maru	Japan	December 29, 1915	A steamer that was sunk by U-34.	34°07′N 22°12′E
Kilkis	Hellenic Navy	April 23, 1941	A training ship, a former Mississippi-class battleship, sunk by German aircraft in the harbor at Salamis Naval Base in Greece.	
HMS Kingston	Royal Navy	April 11, 1942	A K-class destroyer bombed and damaged beyond repair by German aircraft while in drydock at Malta, after being heavily damaged by the Italian battleship Littorio on 22 March. Later scuttled and sunk as a blockship between the Selmun headland and Selmunett Island in northern Malta.	
HMS Kipling	Royal Navy	May 12, 1942	A K-class destroyer that was sunk by German bombers northwest of Mersa Matruh, Egypt.	32°23′24″N 26°11′24″E
HMS Laforey	Royal Navy	March 30, 1944	An L-class destroyer that was torpedoed by U-233 north of Palermo, Sicily.	38°54′N 14°18′E
Lamoricière	Vichy France	January 9, 1942	An ocean liner that sank in a storm about 10 kilometres (5.4 nmi) northeast of Menorca, resulting in 292 deaths.	
HMS Latona	Royal Navy	October 25, 1941	An Abdiel-class minelayer sunk by a German dive bomber aircraft north of Bardia, Libya.	32°15′N 024°14′E
Lemnos	Hellenic Navy	April 23, 1941	A training ship, a former Mississippi-class battleship, sunk by German aircraft in the harbor at Salamis Naval Base in Greece.	
Léon Gambetta	French Navy	April 27, 1915	A Léon Gambetta-class armored cruiser that was torpedoed by U-5 about 15 nautical miles (28 km) south of Santa Maria di Leuca.	39°30′N 18°15′E
Letchworth	United Kingdom	April 1, 1971	A cargo ship that ran aground and sunk near Kos.	36°32′N 26°57′E
Lesbian	United Kingdom	January 5, 1917	A cargo ship that was sunk by U-35 east of Malta.	35°48′N 17°6′E
Lesbian	United Kingdom	July 14, 1941	A cargo ship that was seized by Vichy French forces in Beirut harbour in 1940. In 1941, she was taken a short distance offshore and scuttled. Now a popular dive site.	
Liberté	French Navy	September 25, 1911	A Liberté-class battleship wrecked by an internal explosion at Toulon, France.	
HMS Lightning	Royal Navy	March 12, 1943	An L-class destroyer that was sunk by German torpedo boats.	37°53′N 9°50′E
Lika	Austro-Hungarian Navy	December 29, 1915	A Tátra-class destroyer that sank in the Adriatic Sea after striking two mines off Durazzo, Albania.	
HMS Lively	Royal Navy	May 11, 1942	An L-class destroyer that was sunk by German dive-bombers 100 nautical miles (190 km) northeast of Tobruk, Libya.	33°24′N 25°38′E
USS LST-348	United States Navy	February 20, 1944	An LST-1-class tank landing ship that was sunk by U-410.	40°57′N 13°14′E
HMS M28	Royal Navy	January 20, 1918	An M15-class monitor sunk in the Aegean Sea off Imbros by the Ottoman Navy battlecruiser Yavuz Sultan Selim during the Battle of Imbros.	40°13′43″N 025°57′46″E
USS Maddox	United States Navy	August 19, 1943	A Gleaves-class destroyer that was sunk by a German dive bomber aircraft in the Battle of Gela.	36°52′N 13°56′E
Magenta	French Navy	October 31, 1875	A Magenta-class broadside ironclad which exploded and sank at Toulon, France.	
Maloja	Switzerland	September 7, 1943	A cargo ship that sunk after being accidentally attacked by British aircraft.	42°50′N 8°11′E
HMS Majestic	Royal Navy	May 27, 1915	A Majestic-class battleship sunk outside the southern entrance to the Dardanelles off Cape Helles on the Gallipoli Peninsula by the Imperial German Navy submarine U-21 .	40°02′30″N 026°11′02″E
HMS Martin	Royal Navy	November 10, 1942	An M-class destroyer that was torpedoed by the German submarine U-431 off Algiers, Algeria.	37°53′N 003°57′E
Masséna	French Navy	November 9, 1915	A decommissioned battleship scuttled off Cape Helles on the Gallipoli Peninsula to serve as a breakwater during the Gallipoli Campaign.	
Merion	Royal Navy	May 31, 1915	An ocean liner built in 1902 for the American Line. Purchased by the Royal Navy to act as a decoy ship for the battlecruiser HMS Tiger. Sunk by the German submarine UB-8.	
Meyer London	United States	April 16, 1944	A Liberty ship that was torpedoed by U-407 17 miles (27 km) off Derna.	32°51′N 23°00′E
Midilli	Ottoman Navy	January 20, 1918	A Magdeburg-class light cruiser that sank after striking five mines in the Aegean Sea off Imbros during the Battle of Imbros.	40°03′42″N 025°58′42″E
Milazzo	Italy	August 29, 1917	A bulk carrier that was torpedoed by the Austro-Hungarian Navy submarine U-14 about 250 nautical miles (460 km; 290 mi) east of Malta.	
Minas	Regia Marina	February 15, 1917	A troopship that was torpedoed by U-39.	36°25′N 18°24′E
Minerve	French Navy	January 27, 1968	A Daphné-class submarine which sank in 2,350 metres (7,710 ft) of water in the Gulf of Lion approximately 25 nautical miles (46 km; 29 mi) from Toulon, France.	
HMS Mohawk	Royal Navy	April 16, 1941	A Tribal-class destroyer that was sunk by the Italian Navigatori-class destroyer Luca Tarigo off the Kerkennah Islands, Tunisia.	34°56′0″N 11°42′0″E
Monge	French Navy	December 28, 1915	A Pluviôse-class submarine sunk by the Austro-Hungarian destroyer Balaton in the Adriatic Sea off Cattaro, Austria-Hungary.	
HMS Naiad	Royal Navy	March 11, 1942	A Dido-class light cruiser that was sunk by the German submarine U-565 south of Crete.	32°1′N 26°20′E
USS Nauset	United States Navy	September 9, 1943	A Navajo-class fleet tug that was sunk by German aircraft.	40°38′N 14°38′E
Nembo	Regia Marina	October 17, 1916	A Nembo-class destroyer torpedoed and sunk in the Adriatic Sea off the coast of Albania by the Austro-Hungarian submarine U-16.	40°08′N 019°30′E
HMS Neptune	Royal Navy	December 19, 1941	A Leander-class light cruiser that was sunk by mines off Tripoli, Libya.	33°15′N 13°30′E
HMAS Nestor	Royal Australian Navy	June 16, 1942	An N-class destroyer that was attacked by an Italian bomber and scuttled south of Crete.	33°36′N 24°30′E
Nereide	Regia Marina	August 5, 1915	A Nautilus-class submarine that was torpedoed by U-5 near Palagruža in the Adriatic Sea.	42°23′N 16°16′E
HMHS Newfoundland	United Kingdom	September 14, 1943	A hospital ship that was attacked by German aircraft and scuttled off Salerno, Italy.	40°13′N 14°21′E
HMS Ocean	Royal Navy	March 18, 1915	A Canopus-class battleship sunk by a mine in the southern entrance to the Dardanelles during the Dardanelles campaign.	
HMS P48	Royal Navy	December 25, 1942	A U-class submarine that was sunk by Italian torpedo boats northwest of Zembra, Tunisia.	37°15′N 10°30′E
HMS Pakenham	Royal Navy	April 16, 1943	A P-class destroyer that was sunk in action by Italian torpedo boats southwest of Marsala.	37°26′N 12°30′E
Pampa	United Kingdom	August 27, 1918	A troopship that was torpedoed by UC-22 about 84 nautical miles (156 km) east of Malta.	
HMAS Parramatta	Royal Australian Navy	November 27, 1941	A Grimsby-class sloop that was torpedoed by U-559.	32°20′N 24°35′E
Partenope	Regia Marina	March 24, 1918	A Partenope-class torpedo cruiser that was torpedoed north of Bizerte, Tunisia, by UC-67.	37°53′N 10°10′E
USS PC-558	United States Navy	May 9, 1944	A PC-461-class submarine chaser that was torpedoed by U-230.	38°41′N 13°43′E
HMS Penelope	Royal Navy	February 18, 1944	An Arethusa-class light cruiser that was torpedoed by U-140 west of Naples, Italy.	40.55°N 13.25°E
Peresvet	Imperial Russian Navy	January 4, 1917	An armored cruiser, formerly a Peresvet-class battleship, that burned and sank after striking two mines 10 nautical miles (19 km; 12 mi) north of Port Said.	
Perseo	Italy	August 18, 1942	A merchant ship that was torpedoed by HMS Safari 15 nautical miles (28 km; 17 mi) south of Serpentara on the island of Sardinia.	
Persia	United Kingdom	December 30, 1915	A passenger liner that was torpedoed by U-38 about 71 nautical miles (131 km; 82 mi) southeast of Cape Martello, Crete.	
Pola	Regia Marina	March 29, 1941	A Zara-class heavy cruiser that was sunk by British battleships in the Battle of Cape Matapan.	35°19′N 20°59′E
Principe Umberto	Italy	June 8, 1916	An armed merchant cruiser torpedoed by the Austro-Hungarian Navy submarine U-5 in the Adriatic Sea off the coast of the Principality of Albania 15 nautical miles (28 km; 17 mi) southwest of the Karaburun Peninsula with the loss of 1,926 lives.	40°19′N 019°10′E
HMS Quentin	Royal Navy	December 2, 1942	A Q-class destroyer that was sunk by German aircraft.	37°32′N 08°32′E
HMS Raglan	Royal Navy	January 20, 1918	An Abercrombie-class monitor sunk in the Aegean Sea off Imbros by the Ottoman Navy battlecruiser Yavuz Sultan Selim during the Battle of Imbros.	40°14′N 025°58′E
HMS Rainbow	Royal Navy	October 4, 1940	A Rainbow-class submarine that was sunk after being rammed by the Italian merchant ship Antonietta Costa.	41°28′N 18°05′E
HMT Rohna	Royal Navy	November 26, 1943	A troopship that was sunk by German aircraft.	37°1′12″N 5°12′6″E
Roma	Regia Marina	September 9, 1943	A Littorio-class battleship sunk by German aircraft in the Strait of Bonifacio.	41°09′28″N 008°17′35″E
HMT Royal Edward	Royal Navy	August 13, 1915	A passenger ship that was torpedoed by UB-14, with possibly as many as 1,865 dead.	
HMS Russell	Royal Navy	April 27, 1916	A Duncan-class battleship sunk by a mine off Malta.	35°54′N 014°36′E
Russian	United Kingdom	December 14, 1916	An ocean liner that was torpedoed by U-43.	35°30′N 18°52′E
HMS Sahib	Royal Navy	April 24, 1943	An S-class submarine that was attacked by Climene and scuttled southwest of Tunis, Tunisia.	37°29′N 10°46′E
Sant Anna	France	May 11, 1918	A troopship that was torpedoed by UC-54 northeast of Tunis, Tunisia.	37.0400°N 11.3600°E
Santa Elisa	United States	August 13, 1942	A refrigerator ship that was torpedoed by Italian motor boats 25 nautical miles (46 km) southeast of Cape Bon, Tunisia.	36°20′N 11°28′E
Seward	United States	April 7, 1917	A steamer that was carrying war materials which was sunk by U-52.	36°20′N 11°28′E
Sidi-Bel-Abbès	France	April 20, 1943	A troopship carrying Senegalese soldiers that was torpedoed by U-565 about 60 miles (97 km) west of Oran.	35°59′N 1°25′W
Simone Schiaffino	Regia Marina	April 24, 1941	A torpedo boat which struck an Italian mine off Cape Bon, Tunisia.	
USS Skill	United States Navy	September 25, 1943	An Auk-class minesweeper that was torpedoed by U-593.	40°20′N 14°35′E
HMS Southampton	Royal Navy	January 11, 1941	A Town-class light cruiser scuttled southeast of Malta after sustaining damage in an attack by German dive bombers.	34°54′N 18°24′E
HMS Spartan	Royal Navy	January 29, 1944	A Dido-class light cruiser sunk by German aircraft off Anzio, Italy, during the Battle of Anzio.	41°26′02″N 012°41′02″E
HMS Splendid	Royal Navy	April 21, 1943	An S-class submarine that was sunk by Hermes west of Livorno, Italy.	43°34′N 9°37′E
HMS Sportsman	Royal Navy	September 24, 1952	An S-class submarine that sank off Toulon, France.	43°01′N 7°40′E
HMS Sussex	Royal Navy	1694	An English warship that sank with a cargo of gold, possibly worth $500 million	
TA20	Kriegsmarine	November 1, 1944	A torpedo boat — a former Urakaze-class destroyer — sunk in the Adriatic Sea south of Lošinj, Yugoslavia by the British destroyers HMS Avon Vale and HMS Wheatland.	(44°36′N 14°32′E)
TA21	Kriegsmarine	November 5, 1944	A torpedo boat — a former Indomito-class destroyer — sunk in an American air attack at Fiume.	
TA22	Kriegsmarine	May 3, 1945	A torpedo boat — a former Rosolino Pilo-class destroyer — that was scuttled at Muggia, Italy.	
TA35	Kriegsmarine	August 17, 1944	A torpedo boat — a former Rosolino Pilo-class destroyer — that sank after striking a mine in the Fasana Channel on the coast of Dalmatia.	41°53′N 013°47′E
HMS Tempest	Royal Navy	February 13, 1942	A T-class submarine that was sunk by the Italian destroyer Circe near the Gulf of Taranto.	39°15′0″N 17°45′0″E
Tetuán	Canton of Cartagena	December 30, 1873	An armored frigate that burned and sank at Cartagena, Spain.	
Triglav	Austro-Hungarian Navy	December 29, 1915	A Tátra-class destroyer sunk by French Navy destroyers in the Adriatic Sea.	
HMS Triumph	Royal Navy	May 25, 1915	A Swiftsure-class battleship torpedoed by the Imperial German Navy submarine U-21 off Gaba Tepe on the Gallipoli Peninsula.	
Turbine	Regia Marina	May 24, 1915	A Nembo-class destroyer sunk by the Austro-Hungarian Navy light cruiser Helgoland and destroyers Csepel, Lika, and Tátra in the Adriatic Sea off Vieste, Italy.	
HMS Tynedale	Royal Navy	December 12, 1943	A Hunt-class destroyer that was torpedoed by U-593 off Jijel, Algeria.	37°10′N 6°5′E
U-16	Austro-Hungarian Navy	October 17, 1916	A U-10-class submarine which sank in the Adriatic Sea off the coast of Albania after attacking an Italian convoy.	
U-32	Imperial German Navy	May 8, 1918	A Type U 31 U-boat that was sunk by HMS Wallflower north of Libya.	36°8′N 13°30′E
U-74	Kriegsmarine	May 2, 1942	A Type VIIB U-boat that was sunk by British forces east of Cartagena, Spain.	37°32′N 0°10′E
U-75	Kriegsmarine	December 28, 1941	A Type VIIB U-boat that was sunk by HMS Kipling off Mersa Matruh, Egypt.	31°50′N 26°40′E
U-79	Kriegsmarine	December 23, 1941	A Type VIIC U-boat that was sunk by HMS Hasty and HMS Hotspur.	32°15′N 25°19′E
U-95	Kriegsmarine	November 28, 1941	A Type VIIC U-boat that was torpedoed by a Dutch submarine off the south coast of Spain.	36°24′N 3°20′W
U-259	Kriegsmarine	November 15, 1942	A Type VIIC U-boat that was sunk by a British aircraft north of Algiers, Algeria.	37°20′N 3°5′E
U-301	Kriegsmarine	January 21, 1943	A Type VIIC U-boat that was torpedoed by HMS Sahib west of Bonifacio, Corsica.	41°27′N 07°04′E
U-371	Kriegsmarine	May 4, 1944	A Type VIIC U-boat that was sunk by Allied destroyers north of Jijel, Algeria.	37°49′N 05°39′E
U-374	Kriegsmarine	January 12, 1942	A Type VIIC U-boat that was torpedoed by HMS Unbeaten south of Bova Marina, Italy.	37.50°N 16.00°E
U-443	Kriegsmarine	February 23, 1943	A Type VIIC U-boat that was sunk by British destroyers northwest of Algiers, Algeria.	36°55′N 2°25′E
U-557	Kriegsmarine	December 16, 1941	A Type VIIC U-boat that was rammed by the Italian torpedo boat Orione west of Crete.	35.31°N 23.19°E
UB-52	Imperial German Navy	May 23, 1918	A Type UB III U-boat that was sunk by HMS H4 northwest of Durrës, Albania.	41°36′N 18°52′E
UB-53	Imperial German Navy	August 3, 1918	A Type UB III U-boat that was sunk by mines in the Strait of Otranto.	39°40′N 18°40′E
UB-66	Imperial German Navy	January 18, 1918	A Type UB III U-boat that was sunk by HMS Campanula off Euboea, Greece.	38°30′N 24°25′E
UB-68	Imperial German Navy	October 4, 1918	A Type UB III U-boat that was sunk northeast of Misrata, Libya.	33°56′N 16°20′E
UB-69	Imperial German Navy	January 9, 1918	A Type UB III U-boat that was sunk by HMS Cyclamen northeast of Tunis, Tunisia.	37°30′N 10°38′E
HMS Union	Royal Navy	July 20, 1941	A U-class submarine that was sunk by the Italian torpedo boat Circe southwest of Pantelleria.	36°27′23″N 11°42′21″E
Verona	United Kingdom	May 11, 1918	A passenger ship that was torpedoed by UC-52 east of Syracuse, Sicily.	37°04′N 16°19′E
RMS Viceroy of India	United Kingdom	November 11, 1942	An ocean liner and troopship that was torpedoed by U-407 about 30 nautical miles (56 km) north of Oran, Algeria.	36°26′N 0°24′W
HMS Victoria	Royal Navy	June 22, 1893	A Victoria-class battleship that was accidentally rammed by the battleship HMS Camperdown off Tripoli, Lebanon.	
Volo	United Kingdom	December 28, 1941	A cargo ship that was torpedoed by U-75 about 45 nautical miles (83 km) northwest of Mersa Matruh, Egypt.	31°45′N 26°48′E
Waitemata	New Zealand	July 14, 1918	A cargo ship that was torpedoed by UB-105 north of Tobruk, Libya.	33°21′N 24°10′E
HMAS Waterhen	Royal Australian Navy	June 30, 1941	A W-class destroyer that was sunk by German and Italian dive bombers off Sallum, Egypt.	32°15′N 25°20′E
HMS Welshman	Royal Navy	February 1, 1943	An Abdiel-class minelayer torpedoed by the German submarine U-617 east of Tobruk, Libya.	32°12′N 24°52′E
William B. Woods	United States	March 10, 1944	A Liberty ship sunk after being torpedoed by the German submarine U-952 47 miles (76 km) northeast of Palermo, Sicily.	38°36′N 13°45′E
HMS Wryneck	Royal Navy	April 27, 1941	An Admiralty W-class destroyer sunk by German aircraft 20 nautical miles (37 km; 23 mi) east of Cape Maleas, Greece.	36°30′N 23°34′E
Yasaka Maru	Japan	December 21, 1915	A passenger steamer that was torpedoed by U-38 about 60 nautical miles (111 km; 69 mi) from Port Said. It was one of the largest ships that was either sunk or damaged during World War I.	31°53′N 31°10′E
Yoma	United Kingdom	June 17, 1943	A troopship carrying Free French Naval Forces and British Army personnel that was torpedoed by the German submarine U-81.	33°03′N 22°04′E
HMS York	Royal Navy	March 26, 1941	A York-class heavy cruiser beached in Suda Bay on the coast of Crete after sustaining damage in an attack by Italian MT explosive motorboats.	35°29′00″N 024°08′17″E
Zara	Regia Marina	March 29, 1941	A Zara-class cruiser that was sunk by British battleships in the Battle of Cape Matapan.	35°20′N 20°57′E
Zêzere	Portuguese Navy	November 29, 1921	A torpedo boat that sank in a storm off Morocco while under tow by the tug NRP Patrão Lopes (Portuguese Navy).	
HMS Zulu	Royal Navy	September 14, 1942	A Tribal-class destroyer that was sunk by Italian aircraft northwest of Alexandria, Egypt.	32°0′N 28°56′E

== North Channel ==
Ship	Flag	Sunk Date	Notes	Coordinates
HMS Bayano	Royal Navy	11 March 1915	An auxiliary cruiser torpedoed by U-27.	55°3.0348′N 05°26.0976′W
Dettifoss	Iceland	21 February 1945	A cargo ship torpedoed by U-1064.	55°03′N 5°29′W
HMS Graph	Royal Navy	20 March 1944	Formerly the German U-boat U-570, served with Royal Navy after being captured in 1941. Ran aground and was wrecked while being towed to the Clyde for scrapping.	55°48′06″N 6°28′30″W
HMS Drake	Royal Navy	2 October 1917	A Drake-class armoured cruiser torpedoed by the Imperial German Navy submarine U-79 in Church Bay 5 nautical miles (9.3 km; 5.8 mi) off Rathlin Island.	55°17.1084′N 006°12.5136′W
HMS Emerald	Royal Navy	24 October 1947	A Emerald-class light cruiser that sank during target trials in Kames Bay off Rothesay, Scotland.	
U-680	Kriegsmarine	28 December 1945	A Type VIIC U-boat scuttled in Operation Deadlight.	55°24′N 6°29′W
U-968	Kriegsmarine	29 November 1945	A Type VIIC U-boat scuttled in Operation Deadlight.	55°24′N 06°22′W
UB-82	Imperial German Navy	17 April 1918	A Type UB III U-boat sunk by HMS Pilot Me and HMS Young Fred.	55°13′N 5°55′W

== North Sea ==
Ship	Flag	Sunk date	Notes	Coordinates
HMS Aboukir	Royal Navy	22 September 1914	A Cressy-class armored cruiser torpedoed by the Imperial German Navy submarine U-9 in the Broad Fourteens in the action of 22 September 1914.	53.0°N 003.75°E
RMS Alcantara	United Kingdom	29 February 1916	An armed merchant cruiser sunk by the Imperial German Navy merchant raider SMS Greif east of the Shetland Islands in the Action of 29 February 1916.	
HMS Amphion	Royal Navy	6 August 1914	An Active-class scout cruiser that ran into a minefield. The first British naval vessel lost in World War I.	52.11°N 2.36°E
HMS Arabis	Royal Navy	10 February 1916	An Arabis-class sloop torpedoed by Imperial German Navy destroyers during the Second Battle of Dogger Bank.	
HMS Ardent	Royal Navy	1 June 1916	An Acasta-class destroyer sunk by the Imperial German Navy battleship SMS Westfalen in the Battle of Jutland.	56°42′N 5°52′E
HMS Arethusa	Royal Navy	11 February 1916	An Arethusa-class light cruiser that drifted onto a shoal and was wrecked while under tow after striking a mine off Felixstowe, England.	53°58′N 006°42′E
HMS Argyll	Royal Navy	28 October 1915	A Devonshire-class armoured cruiser wrecked on Inchcape, also known as the Bell Rock, near Dundee, Scotland	56°26′N 002°23.5′W
SMS Ariadne	Imperial German Navy	28 August 1914	A Gazelle-class light cruiser sunk by Royal Navy battlecruisers in the Heligoland Bight during the Battle of Heligoland Bight.	
HMS Ariel	Royal Navy	2 August 1918	An Acheron-class destroyer that struck a mine east of Heligoland, Germany.	54°10′N 8°4′E
HMS Black Prince	Royal Navy	1 June 1916	A Duke of Edinburgh-class armored cruiser sunk by Imperial German Navy battleships during the Battle of Jutland.	
SMS Blücher	Imperial German Navy	24 January 1915	An armored cruiser sunk by Royal Navy warships during the Battle of Dogger Bank.	54°33′30″N 005°27′50″E
Bourbon Dolphin	Norway	15 April 2007	An anchor handling tug supply vessel that capsized off Shetland, Scotland.	59.9305°N 0.439333°W
HMS Brilliant	Royal Navy	23 April 1918	An Apollo-class protected cruiser scuttled in the entrance to the harbor at Ostend, Belgium, during the First Ostend Raid.	
HMS Bulwark	Royal Navy	26 November 1914	A London-class battleship sunk by an accidental internal explosion in Kethole Reach in the Medway estuary on the coast of England 4 nautical miles (7.4 km; 4.6 mi) west of Sheerness .	51°25.39′N 000°39.20′E
Charkow	Denmark	19 March 1940	A merchant ship that was torpedoed by U-19 with all hands being lost.	58°07′N 2°39′E
Charles D. McIver	United States	5 February 1945	A Liberty ship that sunk after striking a mine when leaving Antwerp.	
SMS Cöln	Imperial German Navy	28 August 1914	A Kolberg-class light cruiser sunk by Royal Navy warships in the Heligoland Bight during the Battle of Heligoland Bight.	
HMS Coquette	Royal Navy	7 March 1916	A D-class destroyer that hit a mine east of Clacton-on-Sea, England.	51°45′N 01°30′E
HMS Cressy	Royal Navy	22 September 1914	A Cressy-class armored cruiser torpedoed by U-9 in the Broad Fourteens in the action of 22 September 1914.	52°15′01″N 3°40′08″E
HMS D5	Royal Navy	3 November 1914	A D-class submarine sunk by a mine 2 nautical miles (3.7 km; 2.3 mi) south of South Cross Buoy off Great Yarmouth during the Raid on Yarmouth.	
Dana	Royal Danish Navy	22 June 1935	A research trawler sunk in collision with German fishing trawler Pickhuben off Cuxhaven in dense fog.	55°55′N 07°00′E
HMS Daring	Royal Navy	18 February 1940	A D-class destroyer that was torpedoed by U-23.	58°39′N 01°40′W
HMS Defence	Royal Navy	24 December 1811	A Bellona-class ship of the line stranded on the west coast of Jutland in a storm, together with HMS St George.	56°21′28″N 08°06′00″E
HMS Defence	Royal Navy	31 May 1916	A Minotaur-class armored cruiser sunk during the Battle of Jutland.	56°58′02″N 005°49′50″E
Deutschland	Germany	6 December 1875	A steamship that ran aground in a blizzard on a shoal 25 nautical miles (46 km) off Harwich, England.	51°40′00″N 01°37′00″E
Doris	French Navy	8 May 1940	A Circé-class submarine that was torpedoed by U-9 about 30 nautical miles (56 km; 35 mi) off Den Helder, Netherlands.	52°47.36′N 3°49.16′E
HMS Dunoon	Royal Navy	30 April 1940	A Hunt-class minesweeper that struck a mine off Great Yarmouth, England.	52°45′N 2°23′E
HMS E22	Royal Navy	25 April 1916	An E-class submarine torpedoed by the Imperial German Navy submarine UB-18 off Great Yarmouth during the Bombardment of Yarmouth and Lowestoft.	
SMS Elbing	Imperial German Navy	1 June 1916	A Pillau-class light cruiser scuttled during the Battle of Jutland.	
HMS Esk	Royal Navy	31 August 1940	An E-class destroyer that ran into a minefield north of Texel, Netherlands.	53°26′36″N 03°48′00″E
HMS Exmouth	Royal Navy	21 January 1940	An E-class destroyer that was torpedoed by U-22 in the Moray Firth.	58°18′N 2°25′W
HMS Falcon	Royal Navy	1 April 1918	A C-class destroyer that collided with HMS John Fitzgerald about 18 nautical miles (33 km) southeast of Flamborough Head, England.	
HMS Falmouth	Royal Navy	20 August 1916	A Town-class light cruiser torpedoed by the Imperial German Navy submarine U-63 off Flamborough Head during the Action of 19 August 1916.	53°58.93′N 000°04.50′W
Flandria	Sweden	18 January 1940	A merchant ship that was torpedoed by U-9.	54°00′N 3°40′E
HMS Flirt	Royal Navy	26 October 1916	A C-class destroyer sunk by Imperial German Navy torpedo boats while defending the Dover Barrage during the First Battle of Dover Strait.	
HMS Fortune	Royal Navy	1 June 1916	A Acasta-class destroyer sunk by Imperial German Navy warships during the Battle of Jutland.	
SMS Frauenlob	Imperial German Navy	1 June 1916	A Gazelle-class light cruiser torpedoed by the Royal Navy light cruiser HMS Southampton during the Battle of Jutland.	56.1500°N 005.4800°E
HMS G9	Royal Navy	16 September 1917	A G-class submarine that was rammed by HMS Pasley 70 nautical miles (130 km) northwest of Bergen, Norway.	61°00′N 3°20′E
SMS G42	Imperial German Navy	21 April 1917	A V25-class torpedo boat rammed by the Royal Navy destroyer HMS Swift in the Dover Barrage during the Second Battle of Dover Strait.	
SMS G85	Imperial German Navy	21 April 1917	A V25-class torpedo boat torpedoed by the Royal Navy flotilla leader HMS Broke in the Dover Barrage during the Second Battle of Dover Strait.	
HMS Gala	Royal Navy	28 April 1908	A River-class destroyer that collided with HMS Attentive near Harwich, England.	
SMS Greif	Imperial German Navy	29 February 1916	A merchant raider sunk by Royal Navy warships east of the Shetland Islands in the Action of 29 February 1916..	61°45′N 001°10′E
HMS Grenville	Royal Navy	19 January 1940	A G-class destroyer that struck a mine northeast of Broadstairs, England.	51°39′N 02°17′E
HMS Gurkha	Royal Navy	9 April 1940	A Tribal-class destroyer that was sunk by German bomber aircraft southwest of Bergen, Norway.	59°13′0″N 4°0′0″E
Gustaf E. Reuter	Sweden	27 November 1939	A tanker that was torpedoed by U-48 about 14 nautical miles (26 km) northwest of Fair Isle, Scotland.	59°38′N 02°03′W
HMS Hawke	Royal Navy	15 October 1914	A Edgar-class protected cruiser torpedoed by U-9 off Aberdeen, Scotland.	57°47′05″N 000°11′50″E
SMS Hela	Imperial German Navy	13 September 1914	An aviso torpedoed by the British submarine HMS E9 in the Heligoland Bight 6 nautical miles (11 km; 6.9 mi) southwest of Helgoland.	54°03′N 007°55′E
Henry B. Plant	United States	5 February 1945	A Liberty ship that sank after being torpedoed by U-245.	51°19′N 1°42′E
HMS Hermes	Royal Navy	31 October 1914	A Highflyer-class protected cruiser torpedoed by the Imperial German Navy submarine U-27 at the northeastern end of the Strait of Dover.	51°06′18″N 001°50′18″E
HMS Hogue	Royal Navy	22 September 1914	A Cressy-class armored cruiser torpedoed by U-9 in the Broad Fourteens in the action of 22 September 1914.	
Horace Binney	United States	8 May 1945	A Liberty ship that sank after hitting a mine. It was later broken up in Antwerp in May 1948.	51°12′N 02°27′E
HMS Indefatigable	Royal Navy	31 May 1916	An Indefatigable-class battlecruiser sunk by the Imperial German Navy battlecruiser SMS Von der Tann in the Battle of Jutland.	57°02′40″N 6°07′15″E
HMS Intrepid	Royal Navy	23 April 1918	An Apollo-class protected cruiser scuttled at Zeebrugge, Belgium, during the Zeebrugge Raid.	
HMS Invincible	Royal Navy	31 May 1916	An Invincible-class battlecruiser sunk by the Imperial German Navy battlecruisers SMS Lützow and SMS Derfflinger in the Battle of Jutland.	
HMS Iphigenia	Royal Navy	23 April 1918	An Apollo-class protected cruiser scuttled at Zeebrugge, Belgium, during the Zeebrugge Raid.	
HMS Itchen	Royal Navy	6 July 1917	A River-class destroyer that was torpedoed by the German submarine UC-44.	58°35′N 00°45′W
HMS Ivanhoe	Royal Navy	1 September 1940	An I-class destroyer that struck a mine and was scuttled.	53°26′42″N 03°45′24″E
HMS K1	Royal Navy	18 November 1917	A K-class submarine that was scuttled after a collision with HMS Blonde.	56°20′20″N 5°43′50″E
USS Kerwood	United States Navy	12 December 1919	A cargo ship that struck a mine 20 nautical miles (37 km) north of Terschelling, Netherlands.	
SMS Königin Luise	Imperial German Navy	5 August 1914	An auxiliary minelayer scuttled in Heligoland Bight under fire from Royal Navy warships. The first German naval vessel lost in World War I.	
Leipzig	Royal Navy	16 December 1946	A Leipzig-class light cruiser that was scuttled with a cargo of gas munitions.	57°53′N 6°13′E
Linda	Estonia	11 February 1940	A cargo ship that was torpedoed by U-9.	58°15′N 1°54′E
SMS Lützow	Imperial German Navy	1 June 1916	A Derfflinger-class battlecruiser sunk in the Battle of Jutland.	56°15′N 005°53′E
SMS Mainz	Imperial German Navy	28 August 1914	A Kolberg-class light cruiser sunk by Royal Navy warships in the Heligoland Bight during the Battle of Heligoland Bight.	
HMS Mary Rose	Royal Navy	17 October 1917	An Admiralty M-class destroyer that was sunk by the Imperial German Navy light cruisers SMS Brummer and SMS Bremse about 70 nautical miles (130 km) east of Lerwick in the Shetland Islands in the Action off Lerwick.	
Narva	United Kingdom	22 December 1957	A cargo ship that foundered 180 nautical miles (330 km) east of Aberdeen, Scotland.	57°28′N 3°00′E
HMS Natal	Royal Navy	30 December 1915	A Warrior-class armoured cruiser sunk by an accidental internal explosion in the Cromarty Firth near Cromarty, Scotland.	57°41′N 4°05′W
HMS Nestor	Royal Navy	31 May 1916	An Admiralty M-class destroyer sunk by Imperial German Navy battleships during the Battle of Jutland.	
HMS Nomad	Royal Navy	31 May 1916	An Admiralty M-class destroyer sunk by Imperial German Navy battleships during the Battle of Jutland.	
HMS Nottingham	Royal Navy	19 August 1916	A Town-class light cruiser that was torpedoed by the Imperial German Navy submarine U-52 about 120 nautical miles (220 km; 140 mi) southeast of the Firth of Forth, Scotland, during the Action of 19 August 1916.	55°28′54″N 0°11′30″E
HNLMS O 13	Royal Netherlands Navy	12 June 1940	An O 12-class submarine missing after departing Dundee, Scotland.	
HNLMS O 22	Royal Netherlands Navy	November 1940	An O 21-class submarine lost southwest of Stavanger, Norway. Her wreck was rediscovered in 1993.	57°55′N 5°31′E
Oslo	United Kingdom	21 August 1917	A passenger ship that was torpedoed by U-87 15 nautical miles (28 km) east by north of the Out Skerries, Shetland.	
HMS Pathfinder	Royal Navy	5 September 1914	A Pathfinder-class scout cruiser torpedoed off the Firth of Forth by U-21.	
Pluviôse	French Navy	26 May 1910	A Pluviôse-class submarine sunk in a collision off Calais, France.	
SMS Pommern	Imperial German Navy	1 June 1916	A Deutschland-class battleship torpedoed by Royal Navy destroyers during the Battle of Jutland.	57°02′40″N 6°07′15″E
HMS Prince George	Royal Navy	30 December 1921	A decommissioned Majestic-class battleship wrecked off Camperduin, the Netherlands, while on her way to scrapping in Germany.	52°44′05″N 004°38′23″E
HMS Queen Mary	Royal Navy	31 May 1916	A battlecruiser sunk by the Imperial German Navy battlecruiser SMS Derfflinger in the Battle of Jutland.	57°02′40″N 6°07′15″E
HMS Recruit	Royal Navy	1 May 1915	A C-class destroyer that was torpedoed by UB-6.	
SMS Rostock	Imperial German Navy	1 June 1916	A Karlsruhe-class light cruiser scuttled during the Battle of Jutland.	
SMS S20	Imperial German Navy	5 June 1917	A V1-class torpedo boat sunk by Royal Navy warships while approaching Zeebrugge.	
SMS S35	Imperial German Navy	31 May 1916	A V25-class torpedo boat sunk by the Royal Navy battleship HMS Iron Duke during the Battle of Jutland.	
SMS S115	Imperial German Navy	17 October 1914	An S90-class torpedo boat sunk by Royal Navy destroyers about 50 nautical miles (93 km; 58 mi) off Texel during the Battle off Texel.	
SMS S119	Imperial German Navy	17 October 1914	An S90-class torpedo boat sunk by Royal Navy destroyers about 50 nautical miles (93 km; 58 mi) off Texel during the Battle off Texel.	
HMS Shark (1912)	Royal Navy	31 May 1916	An Acasta-class destroyer sunk during the Battle of Jutland.	56°58′30″N 006°03′00″E
HMS Shark (54S)	Royal Navy	6 July 1940	An S-class submarine that sank under tow after being bombed by German aircraft.	58°18′N 5°13′E
HMS Sirius	Royal Navy	23 April 1918	An Apollo-class protected cruiser scuttled in the entrance to the harbor at Ostend, Belgium, during the First Ostend Raid.	
HMS Sparrowhawk	Royal Navy	1 June 1916	A Acasta-class destroyer scuttled during the Battle of Jutland.	
HMS Spearfish	Royal Navy	1 August 1940	An S-class submarine that was sunk by U-34 off the Norwegian coast.	57°50′N 11°00′E
HMS St George	Royal Navy	24 December 1811	A Duke-class ship of the line stranded on the west coast of Jutland in a storm, together with HMS Defence.	56°21′30″N 08°06′00″E
HMS Starfish	Royal Navy	9 January 1940	An S-class submarine that was attacked by a German destroyer and scuttled.	55°00′N 7°10′E
USS Stockton	United States Navy	23 October 1940	A Caldwell-class destroyer that was beached off Fidra, Scotland, and sunk as a target.	56°03′N 0°45′W
HMS Strongbow	Royal Navy	17 October 1917	An R-class destroyer that was scuttled after taking damage from the Imperial German Navy light cruisers SMS Bremse and SMS Brummer about 70 nautical miles (130 km; 81 mi) east of Lerwick in the Shetland Islands in the Action off Lerwick.	
HMS Sunfish	Royal Navy	27 July 1944	An S-class submarine that was accidentally sunk by an RAF bomber.	54°28′N 7°11′E
USS Swasey	United States Navy	26 November 1940	A Clemson-class destroyer that was sunk by a mine while under tow.	56°29′N 0°57′W
Terukuni Maru	Japan	21 November 1939	An ocean liner that sank after hitting a mine at the mouth of the Thames River. After World War II the wreck was cleared with explosives.	
HMS Thetis	Royal Navy	23 April 1918	An Apollo-class protected cruiser scuttled at Zeebrugge, Belgium, during the Zeebrugge Raid.	
HMS Tipperary	Royal Navy	1 June 1916	A Faulknor-class flotilla leader sunk by Imperial German Navy battleships during the Battle of Jutland.	
Tubantia	Netherlands	16 March 1916	An ocean liner that was torpedoed by UB-13 about 50 nautical miles (93 km) off the Dutch coast.	51°49′N 2°50′E
HMS Turbulent	Royal Navy	1 June 1916	A Talisman-class destroyer sunk by the Imperial German Navy battleship SMS Westfalen during the Battle of Jutland.	
U-12	Imperial German Navy	10 March 1915	A Type U 9 U-boat that was sunk by British destroyers about 25 nautical miles (46 km) from Eyemouth, Scotland.	56°15′N 1°56′W
U-15	Kriegsmarine	30 January 1940	A Type IIB U-boat that was accidentally rammed by the Iltis in the Broad Fourteens.	54°24′N 7°50′E
U-25	Kriegsmarine	1 August 1940	A Type 1A U-boat that struck a mine north of Terschelling, Netherlands.	54°14′N 5°7′E
U-35	Kriegsmarine	29 November 1939	A Type VIIA U-boat that was attacked by British destroyers and scuttled.	60°53′N 02°47′E
U-36	Kriegsmarine	4 December 1939	A Type VIIA U-boat that was torpedoed by HMS Salmon near Wilhelmshaven.	57°00′N 5°02′E
U-40	Imperial German Navy	23 June 1915	A Type U 31 U-boat that was torpedoed by HMS C24 about 40 nautical miles (74 km) from Eyemouth, Scotland.	
U-44	Kriegsmarine	13 March 1940	A Type IXA U-boat that struck a mine off the coast of the Netherlands.	54°14′N 5°07′E
U-63	Kriegsmarine	25 February 1940	A Type IIC U-boat that was sunk by British ships south of Shetland, Scotland.	58°40′N 00°10′W
U-251	Kriegsmarine	19 April 1945	A Type VIIC U-boat that was sunk by British and Norwegian aircraft in the Kattegat.	56°37′N 11°51′E
U-309	Kriegsmarine	16 February 1945	A Type VIIC U-boat that was sunk by HMCS Saint John in the Moray Firth.	58°09′N 02°23′W
U-319	Kriegsmarine	15 July 1944	A Type VIIC/41 U-boat that was sunk by a British aircraft southwest of Lindesnes, Norway.	57°40′N 05°00′E
U-1232	Royal Navy	4 March 1946	A Type IXC/40 U-boat that sank under tow.	54°11′N 07°24′E
U-1274	Kriegsmarine	16 April 1945	A Type VIIC/41 U-boat that was sunk by HMS Viceroy east of the Farne Islands, England.	55°36′N 01°24′W
UB-4	Imperial German Navy	15 August 1915	A Type UB 1 U-boat that was sunk by the Inverlyon.	52°43′N 2°18′E
UB-16	Imperial German Navy	10 May 1918	A Type UB I U-boat that was torpedoed by HMS E34.	52°6′N 2°1′E
UB-54	Imperial German Navy	11 March 1918	A Type UB III U-boat that was sunk by British destroyers off Norfolk.	53°15′N 0°45′E
UB-57	Imperial German Navy	14 August 1918	A Type UB III U-boat that was sunk by a mine.	51°56′N 02°02′E
UB-63	Imperial German Navy	28 January 1918	A Type UB III U-boat that was sunk by HMS W.S. Bailey and HMS Fort George.	56°10′N 2°0′E
UB-75	Imperial German Navy	10 December 1917	A Type UB III U-boat that hit a mine east of Flamborough Head, Yorkshire.	54°5′N 0°10′E
UB-83	Imperial German Navy	10 September 1918	A Type UB III U-boat that was sunk by HMS Ophelia.	58°28′N 1°50′W
UB-88	Imperial German Navy	16 October 1918	A Type UB III U-boat that was torpedoed by HMS L12 north of Skagen, Denmark.	57°55′N 10°27′E
UC-30	Imperial German Navy	21 April 1917	A Type UC II U-boat that struck a mine about 66 nautical miles (122 km) west of Nymindegab, Denmark.	55°49′N 06°12′E
UC-71	Imperial German Navy	20 February 1919	A Type UC II U-boat that sank off Heligoland, Germany.	54°10′N 7°54′E
HMS Undine	Royal Navy	7 January 1940	A U-class submarine that was attacked by German minesweepers and scuttled.	54°5′53″N 7°24′17″E
SMS V27	Imperial German Navy	31 May 1916	A V25-class torpedo boat scuttled during the Battle of Jutland.	
SMS V29	Imperial German Navy	31 May 1916	A V25-class torpedo boat torpedoed by the Royal Navy destroyer HMS Petard during the Battle of Jutland.	
SMS V48	Imperial German Navy	31 May 1916	A V25-class torpedo boat sunk during the Battle of Jutland.	56°54′22″N 006°06′28″E
SMS V187	Imperial German Navy	28 August 1914	A S138-class torpedo boat sunk by British warships in the Heligoland Bight during the Battle of Heligoland Bight.	
HMS Vanguard	Royal Navy	9 July 1917	A St Vincent-class battleship sunk by an accidental internal explosion at Scapa Flow.	58.8566°N 003.1062°W
Varyag	Imperial Russian Navy	5 February 1920	A protected cruiser wrecked on rocks while under tow in the Firth of Clyde near Lendalfoot, Scotland.	55°11′03″N 04°56′30″W
HMS Vehement	Royal Navy	2 August 1918	A V-class destroyer sunk by a mine.	
HMS Vindictive	Royal Navy	10 May 1918	An Arrogant-class protected cruiser scuttled as a blockship at Ostend, Belgium, during the Second Ostend Raid.	51.2393734°N 002.9256020°E
SMS Vulkan	Royal Navy	6 April 1919	A salvage tug that was surrendered to British forces and sank under tow.	54°54′N 06°18′E
HMS Walrus	Royal Navy	12 February 1938	A W-class destroyer wrecked on the Mascus Rocks north of Scarborough, England, while under tow.	
HMS Warrior	Royal Navy	1 June 1916	A Warrior-class armoured cruiser sunk by Imperial German Navy warships during the Battle of Jutland.	
HMS Whitley	Royal Navy	19 May 1940	A V and W-class destroyer beached on the coast of Belgium between Nieuwpoort and La Panne after suffering crippling damage in an attack by German dive bombers during the Battle of France.	51°09′04″N 002°39′34″E
SMS Wiesbaden	Imperial German Navy	1 June 1916	A Wiesbaden-class light cruiser sunk by Royal Navy warships during the Battle of Jutland.	57°00′05″N 005°53′37″E
Yarmouth	United Kingdom	27 October 1908	A cargo ship that foundered southeast of Dunwich, England.	52°00′06″N 2°07′00″E
SMS Yorck	Imperial German Navy	4 November 1914	A Roon-class armored cruiser sunk by two German mines near Schillig Roads.	53°40′N 008°05′E

== Norwegian Sea ==
Ship	Flag	Sunk date	Notes	Coordinates
HMS Acasta	Royal Navy	8 June 1940	An A-class destroyer that was sunk by Scharnhorst and Gneisenau.	68.75°N 4.5°E
Adolf Vinnen	Kriegsmarine	23 October 1940	A weather ship that was sunk by British ships northwest of Selje, Norway.	62°29′N 4°23′E
HMS Afridi	Royal Navy	3 May 1940	A Tribal-class destroyer that was sunk by German aircraft.	66°14′N 5°45′E
HMS Ardent	Royal Navy	8 June 1940	An A-class destroyer that was sunk by the German battlecruisers Scharnhorst and Gneisenau.	68°45′N 4°30′E
HMS Curlew	Royal Navy	26 May 1940	A C-class light cruiser sunk by German aircraft in Lavangsfjord, Ofotfjord, near Narvik, Norway.	68.559°N 016.558°E
HMS Effingham	Royal Navy	26 May 1940	A Hawkins-class heavy cruiser scuttled near Bodø, Norway, after striking a rock.	67°16.7′N 014°03.5′E
Executive	United States	5 March 1942	A cargo ship that was torpedoed by U-255.	72°44′N 11°27′E
HMS Glorious	Royal Navy	8 June 1940	A Courageous-class aircraft carrier that was sunk by Scharnhorst and Gneisenau.	68°38′N 03°50′E
HMS Glowworm	Royal Navy	8 April 1940	A G-class destroyer that was sunk by Admiral Hipper off Norway.	64°27′N 6°28′E
Greylock	United States	3 February 1943	A cargo ship that was torpedoed by U-255.	70°52′N 0°21′E
Hessen	Kriegsmarine	7 May 1965	A weather ship that probably sunk due to ice damage.	64°40′N 00°30′E
USS Howick Hall	United States Navy	28 March 1942	A cargo ship that was sunk by German bomber aircraft south of Bear Island.	72°40′N 20°20′E
HMT Juniper	Royal Navy	8 June 1940	A Tree-class naval trawler that was sunk by Admiral Hipper off the coast of Norway.	67°20′N 4°10′E
K-278 Komsomolets	Soviet Navy	7 April 1989	A Soviet nuclear submarine, which caught fire and sank with two nuclear weapons and two nuclear reactors still on board.	73°43′18″N 13°16′54″E
HMS Kite	Royal Navy	21 August 1944	A Black Swan-class sloop that was torpedoed by U-344.	73°01′N 3°57′E
SMS Leopard	Imperial German Navy	16 March 1917	A merchant raider sunk by British warships in the Action of 16 March 1917.	
HMS Mahratta	Royal Navy	25 February 1944	An M-class destroyer that was torpedoed by U-990 about 200 nautical miles (370 km) west of North Cape, Norway.	71°17′N 13°30′E
Nautilus	United States	20 November 1931	A decommissioned O-class submarine (ex-USS O-12) that was scuttled in the Byfjorden about 3 miles (4.8 km) from Bergen, Norway	
Orizaba	Germany	26 February 1940	A cargo ship that ran aground north of Troms, Norway.	70.667°N 20.983°E
Prins Olav	Norway	9 June 1940	A passenger and cargo steamship that was sunk by German bombers off the coast of Norway.	67°07′N 01°00′E
HMS Punjabi	Royal Navy	1 May 1942	A Tribal-class destroyer that collided with HMS King George V in fog.	66°0′N 8°0′W
U-277	Kriegsmarine	1 May 1944	A Type VIIC U-boat that was sunk by a British aircraft southwest of Bear Island, Norway.	73°24′N 15°32′E
U-292	Kriegsmarine	27 May 1944	A Type VIIC/41 U-boat that was sunk by a British aircraft west of Trondheim, Norway.	62°37′N 00°57′E
U-308	Kriegsmarine	4 June 1943	A Type VIIC U-boat that was torpedoed by HMS Truculent northwest of the Faroe Islands.	64°28′N 03°09′W
U-317	Kriegsmarine	26 June 1944	A Type VIIC/41 U-boat that was sunk by British aircraft northeast of the Shetland Islands.	62°3′N 1°45′E
U-335	Kriegsmarine	3 August 1942	A Type VIIC U-boat that was sunk by HMS Saracen northeast of the Faroe Islands.	62°48′N 00°12′W
U-344	Kriegsmarine	22 August 1944	A Type VIIC U-boat that was sunk by a British aircraft northwest of Bear Island.	74°54′N 15°26′E
U-347	Kriegsmarine	17 July 1944	A Type VIIC U-boat that was sunk by a British aircraft west of Narvik, Norway.	68°36′N 08°33′E
U-360	Kriegsmarine	2 April 1944	A Type VIIC U-boat that was sunk by HMS Keppel southwest of Bear Island.	72°28′N 13°04′E
U-361	Kriegsmarine	17 July 1944	A Type VIIC U-boat that was sunk by a British aircraft west of Narvik, Norway.	68°35′N 06°00′E
U-412	Kriegsmarine	22 October 1942	A Type VIIC U-boat that was sunk by a British aircraft northeast of the Faroe Islands.	63°55′N 00°24′E
U-423	Kriegsmarine	17 June 1944	A Type VIIC U-boat that was sunk by a Norwegian aircraft northeast of the Faroe Islands.	63°06′N 02°05′E
U-476	Kriegsmarine	25 May 1944	A Type VIIC U-boat that was attacked by a British aircraft and scuttled by U-990 northwest of Trondheim.	65°08′N 04°53′E
U-477	Kriegsmarine	3 June 1944	A Type VIIC U-boat that was sunk by a Canadian aircraft west of Trondheim, Norway.	63°59′N 01°37′E
U-478	Kriegsmarine	30 June 1944	A Type VIIC U-boat that was sunk by Allied aircraft northeast of the Faroe Islands.	63°27′N 00°50′W
U-601	Kriegsmarine	25 February 1944	A Type VIIC U-boat that was sunk by a British aircraft northwest of Narvik, Norway.	70°26′N 12°40′E
U-644	Kriegsmarine	7 April 1943	A Type VIIC U-boat that was torpedoed by HMS Tuna southeast of Jan Mayen.	69°38′N 5°40′W
U-674	Kriegsmarine	2 May 1944	A Type VIIC U-boat that was sunk by a British aircraft.	70°32′N 4°37′E
U-675	Kriegsmarine	24 May 1944	A Type VIIC U-boat that was sunk by a British aircraft.	62°27′N 03°04′E
U-713	Kriegsmarine	24 February 1944	A Type VIIC U-boat that was sunk by HMS Keppel.	69°27′N 4°53′E
U-715	Kriegsmarine	13 June 1944	A Type VIIC U-boat that was sunk by a Canadian aircraft.	62°55′N 2°59′W
U-867	Kriegsmarine	19 September 1944	A Type IXC U-boat that was sunk by a British aircraft northwest of Bergen, Norway.	62°15′N 01°50′E
U-961	Kriegsmarine	29 March 1944	A Type VIIC U-boat that was sunk by HMS Starling and HMS Wild Goose 150 nautical miles (280 km) north of the Faroe Islands.	
U-973	Kriegsmarine	6 March 1944	A Type VIIC U-boat that was sunk by British aircraft off the coast of Norway.	70°40′N 5°48′E
U-989	Kriegsmarine	14 February 1945	A Type VIIC U-boat that was sunk by British ships north of Shetland.	61°36′N 01°35′W
U-990	Kriegsmarine	25 May 1944	A Type VIIC U-boat that was sunk by a British aircraft north of Veiholmen, Norway.	65°05′N 07°28′E

== South Atlantic ==
Ship	Flag	Sunk date	Notes	Coordinates
Admiral Graf Spee	Kriegsmarine	17 December 1939	A Deutschland-class cruiser, nicknamed a "pocket battleship" by the British, scuttled off Montevideo, Uruguay.	34°58′S 056°17′W
African Star	United States	12 July 1943	A merchant vessel that was torpedoed by U-172.	25°46′S 40°35′W
ARA Almirante Domecq Garcia	Argentine Navy	7 October 1983	A Fletcher-class destroyer sunk as a target off Mar del Plata, Argentina.	39°57′S 057°57′W
HMS Antelope	Royal Navy	24 May 1982	A Type 21 frigate struck by an Argentine 1000 lb bomb on 23 May 1982. The bomb later exploded while an attempt was being made to defuse it, killing one. The explosion, together with a subsequent fire and multiple explosions of on-board munitions caused catastrophic damage. The vessel sank the next day.	51°33′3″S 59°3′30″W
HMS Ardent	Royal Navy	22 May 1982	A Type 21 frigate. Caught fire and was abandoned after multiple bomb hits from three waves of Argentine aircraft on 21 May; sank in shallow water the next day.	51°39′38″S 59°8′12″W
Atlantic Conveyor	United Kingdom	28 May 1982	A roll-on/roll-off container ship owned by Cunard. Hit by two Argentine air-launched missiles on 25 May with the loss of 12 crew including the captain. Sank three days later while under tow.	50°40′S 54°28′W
Bagé	Brazil	1 August 1943	A merchant vessel that was torpedoed by U-185. The vessel was previously German from when it was built in 1912 to 1917 where it was seized by Brazil. Spent a large part of its career sailing from Brazil to Germany.	11°29′S 36°58′W
HMS Birkenhead	Royal Navy	26 February 1852	A troopship which broke in two and sank after striking a rock off the southwest coast of South Africa near Gansbaai.	34°38′42″S 19°17′09″E
Brasiloide	Brazil	18 February 1943	Merchant vessel that sank after being torpedoed by U-518. Originally a German ship but it got seized by Brazil in 1942.	12°47′S 37°33′W
Ceará	Brazilian Navy	10 June 2021	A decommissioned Thomaston-class dock landing ship sunk as a target off Rio de Janeiro and Cabo Frio, Brazil.	
Concordia	Barbados	17 February 2010	A barquentine that capsized 300 nmi (550 km; 340 mi) southeast of Rio de Janeiro, Brazil.	27°28′S 40°53′W
HMS Coventry	Royal Navy	25 May 1982	A Type 42 destroyer. Hit by three bombs dropped by an Argentine A-4 Skyhawk aircraft; two exploded. The ship capsized and sank 20 minutes later with the loss of 19 crew.	51°3′36″S 59°42′12″W
RFA Darkdale	Royal Navy	22 October 1941	A Dale-class oil tanker that was torpedoed by U-68 while anchored at Jamestown, Saint Helena.	
ARA General Belgrano	Argentine Navy	2 May 1982	A Brooklyn-class cruiser sunk by the Royal Navy submarine Conqueror during the Falklands War with the loss of 323 crew.	55°24′S 61°32′W
SATS General Botha	(United Kingdom) South African Navy	13 May 1947	A retired training ship, a former Mersey-class protected cruiser, scuttled by gunfire in False Bay on the southwest coast of South Africa.	34°13′48″S 018°37′48″E
SMS Gneisenau	Imperial German Navy	8 December 1914	German Scharnhorst-class armored cruiser sunk during the World War I Battle of the Falkland Islands.	52°29′58″S 56°9′59″W
Henzada	United Kingdom	24 July 1943	A merchant vessel that was sunk by U-199.	25°30′S 44°00′W
Imo	Norway	30 November 1921	Ran aground at Cape Carysfort on the East Falkland because the helmsman was incapacitated due to drunkenness.	51°24′49.68″S 57°51′14.4″W
ARA Isla de los Estados	Argentine Navy	11 May 1982	Argentine naval supply ship. Sunk after shellfire from HMS Alacrity caused her cargo of fuel and munitions to explode. Only two of the 24 crew survived.	51°42′3″S 59°29′22″W
Monte Cervantes	Weimar Republic	23 January 1930	German cruise liner. Sank in the Beagle Channel near Tierra del Fuego after striking an uncharted rock. All 1,200 passengers and 350 crew were saved, with the exception of the ship's captain	
HMSAS Natal	South African Navy	19 September 1972	A Loch-class frigate sunk as a target off the Cape of Good Hope by gunfire from the frigate President Steyn (South African Navy) and depth charges dropped by Avro Shackleton maritime patrol aircraft of the South African Air Force	
Nortun	Panama	20 March 1943	A merchant vessel which was part of Convoy CN-13 that was torpedoed by U-199 70 miles (110 km) southwest of Luderitz Bay.	27°35′S 14°22′E
SMS Nürnberg	Imperial German Navy	8 December 1914	German Königsberg-class light cruiser sunk during the World War I Battle of the Falkland Islands with the loss of all but five of the crew.	53°28′S 55°4′W
SAS President Steyn	South African Navy	29 April 1991	A President-class Type 12 frigate sunk as a target off the Simon's Town, South Africa, by gunfire and antiship missiles from five Minister-class fast attack craft (South African Navy).	
Sagadahoc	United States	3 December 1941	American merchant vessel that was sunk by U-124. The U-boat's captain thought it was suspicious because lights did not illuminate the flag painted on its side and thus he could not identify the nationality of the vessel because of the dark. It was one of four American ships to be sunk by German U-boats prior to the entry of the United States into World War II.	21°50′S 7°50′W
SMS Scharnhorst	Imperial German Navy	8 December 1914	German Scharnhorst-class armored cruiser sunk during the World War I Battle of the Falkland Islands.	52°29′58″S 56°9′59″W
HMS Sheffield	Royal Navy	10 May 1982	A Type 42 destroyer that foundered while under tow during the Falklands War due to damage she sustained six days earlier when an Argentine air-launched antiship missile struck her.	53°04′S 56°56′W
RFA Sir Galahad	Royal Navy	21 June 1982	A Round Table-class landing ship logistics scuttled due to damage she sustained 13 days earlier when Argentine Air Force aircraft hit her with two or three 500-pound (227 kg) bombs.	51.841°S 58.211°W
Stellar Banner	Marshall Islands	12 June 2020	A very large ore carrier scuttled 150 kilometres (81 nmi; 93 mi) off Maranhão, Brazil.	
HMS Sybille	Royal Navy	16 January 1901	An Apollo-class protected cruiser wrecked on a reef south of Lambert's Bay on the west coast of South Africa.	

== West Africa ==
See also List of shipwrecks of Africa.

Ship	Flag	Sunk date	Notes	Coordinates
Ajax	French Navy	24 September 1940	The Redoutable-class submarine was scuttled off Dakar, Senegal, French West Africa, to prevent her capture by British forces after the British destroyer HMS Fortune damaged her with depth charges and forced her to the surface during the Battle of France.	
Méduse	French Navy	14–15 April 1912	The frigate was beached on the Bay of Arguin off Mauritania.	20.6°N 16.49°W
