= MV C. O. Stillman =

Coordinates: 17°30′N 68°20′W

History
- Name: C. O. Stillman
- Namesake: James Stillman
- Owner: International Petroleum Co (1928–36); Panama Transport Co (1936–42)
- Port of registry: (United Kingdom) London 1928–37; Panama 1937–42
- Route: Aruba — New York (1940–42)
- Builder: Bremer Vulkan, Bremen, Germany
- Yard number: 646
- Completed: February 1928
- In service: 1928
- Out of service: 5 June 1942
- Identification: UK official number 160498; IMO number 1160498; code letters LBVP 1928–33; call sign GTDY 1930–37; call sign HPGQ 1937–42
- Fate: sunk by torpedo
- Notes: World's largest oil tanker 1928–1942

General characteristics
- Type: Oil tanker
- Tonnage: 13,006 GRT; 7,765 NRT; 24,185 DWT
- Length: 584 ft 9.1 in (178.23 m) o/a; 564.9 ft (172.18 m) p/p
- Beam: 75.3 ft (23.0 m)
- Draft: 33 ft 10.75 in (10.3 m)
- Depth: 44.5 ft (13.6 m)
- Installed power: 4,300 ihp (3,200 kW); 1,595 nhp
- Propulsion: two 6-cylinder diesel engines; twin screws
- Speed: 10.7 knots (19.8 km/h)
- Boats & landing craft carried: 2 lifeboats & life rafts amidships; 2 lifeboats, 2 workboats & 2 life rafts aft
- Capacity: 163,145 bbl (25,938.0 m^{3})
- Crew: 47 plus (after 1941); 8 USN Armed Guards
- Notes: could pump 4,000 bbl (640 m^{3}) per hour

MV C. O. Stillman was an oil tanker that was built by a German shipyard in 1928 for a Canadian-based shipping company. A Panamanian subsidiary of Esso bought her at the end of 1936 and she was sunk by the German submarine U-68 in the Caribbean Sea on June 4, 1942 about 41 nautical miles (76 km) southwest of Isla de Mona, Puerto Rico.

C. O. Stillman is notable for having been the world's largest oil tanker, a record that she held throughout her 14-year career.

== International Petroleum Co ==
Bremer Vulkan of Bremen-Vegesack in northern Germany built C. O. Stillman, completing her in February 1928. Her layout was conventional for her era, having separate midships and aft accommodation blocks, her bridge being on the midships block and her single funnel rising from her after block.

She was named after James Stillman, who was chairman of National City Bank and invested with partners including William Rockefeller of Standard Oil. She was built for the International Petroleum Company of Toronto, which owned her for her first eight years.

== Panama Transport Co ==
On 31 December 1936 International Oil sold C. O. Stillman to Panama Transport Co, which was a subsidiary of Standard Oil of New Jersey. She underwent repairs at Rotterdam and then on 24 March 1937 her new owner transferred her registration from Britain to the Panamanian flag of convenience.

C. O. Stillman had a German crew Until 20 August 1939, when it was replaced with a US crew. When the Second World War broke out at the beginning of September 1939 C. O. Stillman was loading oil in Aruba, which she delivered to Quebec on 21 December. On 30 October she sailed from Cartagena, Colombia with a cargo of oil bound Le Havre, France. En route she docked at Newport News, Virginia for repairs. On 4 November the Neutrality Act of 1939 became US law and on 9 November C. O. Stillman's US crew was replaced with a Danish one. She sailed to Halifax, Nova Scotia, joined an eastbound transatlantic convoy and reached Le Havre on 22 December.

C. O. Stillman then recrossed the North Atlantic and switched to carrying oil from Aruba to New York and fresh water on her return voyages to Aruba. From 12 August 1940 she had a US crew again, and after the United States declaration of war upon Japan on 8 December 1941 her complement was supplemented with eight United States Navy Armed Guards.

== Sinking ==
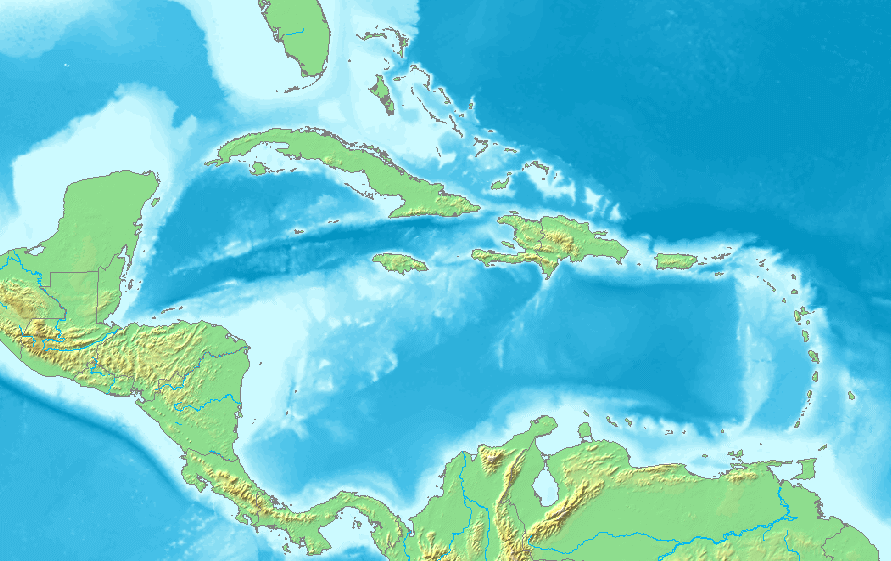
Position of C.O. Stillman's wreck south of the Dominican Republic

At approximately 6 a.m. on 4 June 1942 C. O. Stillman sailed from Aruba, unescorted but in company with another Standard Oil tanker, SS L.J. Drake. As well as her 47 crew and eight guards, C. O. Stillman was carrying three workaway crewmen from other tankers.

C. O. Stillman made 9.5 knots (17.6 km/h) but L.J. Drake made only 9 knots (17 km/h) and fell behind. C.O. Stillman was blacked out in accordance with wartime orders and at dusk the two ships lost visual contact. On 5 June the Type IXC German submarine U-68 under the command of Karl-Friedrich Merten hit L.J. Drake with three torpedoes, sinking her with all hands in only 45 seconds. At 1900 hrs C. O. Stillman received coded messages warning her that enemy submarines were in the area, so at 2000 hrs she altered course to 95 degrees.

At about 2115 hrs C. O. Stillman was about 41 nautical miles (76 km) southwest of Isla de Mona between Puerto Rico and the Dominican Republic when U-68 hit her with a torpedo on the ship's starboard side abaft her midships accommodation block. Third Officer Joseph Winters sounded the general alarm and the Master, Daniel Larsen, telegraphed the engine room to stop engines. The explosion destroyed the No. 1 lifeboat amidships and started a fire that rendered the ship impossible to manoeuvre, made the escape ladders abaft the bridge unusable and made it impossible to approach the No. 2 lifeboat. The crew released the starboard forward life raft but it drifted too close to the fire to be used. They released the port forward life raft but it fouled and became stuck. However, the crew at the after accommodation block managed to launch the No. 3 and No. 4 lifeboats and a life raft.

The three workaways and a US Navy coxswain were trapped in the midships accommodation block but managed to escape by using an axe to break a louver covering a porthole. The personnel trapped amidships eventually found an opening through the fire, through which they escaped to the after accommodation block. At about 2135 hrs First Officer Harry Bansen and Captain Larsen were trying to launch the work-boat when U-68 hit the ship with a second torpedo, again on the starboard side but further aft. It exploded between the engine room and the crossbunker tank, showering the crew with bunker oil.

The ship now sank more rapidly. Men jumped overboard or slid down ropes into the sea, while Captain Larsen remained until the water rose knee deep on the main deck until he had seen that everyone on deck had got clear. C.O. Stillman settled by the stern, her bow rose vertically and she sank within two or three minutes of the second torpedo hitting her. C.O. Stillman sank with a cargo of 125,812 barrels (20,002.5 m^{3}) fuel oil and 39 tons dry cargo destined to be delivered in New York.

== Survival and rescue ==
The survivors were distributed between two lifeboats and two life rafts, all separated from each other. Three men had been lost: Second assistant engineer Laurence Finn, pumpman George Wickline and able seaman John Lane.

There were 17 survivors aboard the No. 3 boat and 13 aboard the No. 4 boat. The next morning both boats set sail for the Dominican Republic. No. 3, whose most senior occupant was the Chief engineer, Fred Lewis, landed at Boca de Yuma, which is almost at the easternmost tip of Hispaniola. No. 4, whose most senior occupant was the first assistant engineer, Laurence Moore, landed at La Romana, which is on the south coast slightly further west.

Larsen's raft contained 20 survivors. They sighted an empty raft, paddled to it and redistributed themselves between the two rafts, then lashed the two together for the night. At dawn on 6 June they sighted two more rafts: an empty one nearby and one further away with five survivors. They paddled to the empty raft and lashed the three rafts together, but the raft with the five survivors was too far to reach. The rafts then drifted throughout 6 June and into the morning of 7 June. A United States Army aircraft sighted the three linked rafts at about 1100 hrs and returned in the late afternoon to guide United States Coast Guard 83-foot patrol boat 83310 (formerly CG 460) from San Juan, Puerto Rico, which reached the rafts just before dusk. The five survivors in the fourth raft had used up their distress flares during the day and were unable to signal their position, but the patrol boat searched for and eventually found them and their raft at about 2100 hrs. The patrol boat had now rescued 25 survivors, which it then landed at Ponce, Puerto Rico at 0500 hrs on 8 June.

Five of the survivors who sailed to the Dominican Republic were US Navy Armed Guards. The 25 who were civilian crew were repatriated on a Pan American World Airways flight from Ciudad Trujillo to Miami. The 25 survivors rescued by the US Coast Guard sailed home from Puerto Rico on the Clyde-Mallory Lines passenger ship SS Seminole, which landed them at Tampa, Florida on 26 June.

== See also ==
- List of shipwrecks in Caribbean Sea
- List of shipwrecks in the Atlantic Ocean#Caribbean Sea
