= German submarine U-68 (1940) =

German World War II submarine

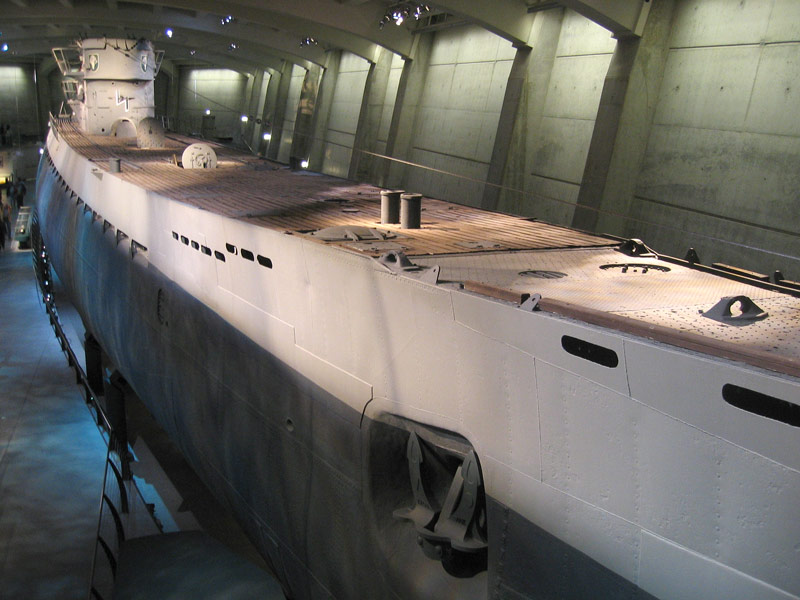
- U-505, a typical Type IXC boat

History

Nazi Germany
- Name: U-68
- Ordered: 7 August 1939
- Builder: DeSchiMAG AG Weser, Bremen
- Yard number: 987
- Laid down: 20 April 1940
- Launched: 22 October 1940
- Commissioned: 11 February 1941
- Fate: Sunk 10 April 1944 north-west of Madeira, Portugal. 56 dead and 1 survivor

General characteristics
- Class & type: Type IXC submarine
- Displacement: 1,120 t (1,100 long tons) surfaced; 1,232 t (1,213 long tons) submerged
- Length: 76.76 m (251 ft 10 in) o/a; 58.75 m (192 ft 9 in) pressure hull
- Beam: 6.76 m (22 ft 2 in) o/a; 4.40 m (14 ft 5 in) pressure hull
- Height: 9.60 m (31 ft 6 in)
- Draught: 4.70 m (15 ft 5 in)
- Installed power: 4,400 PS (3,200 kW; 4,300 bhp) (diesels); 1,000 PS (740 kW; 990 shp) (electric)
- Propulsion: 2 shafts; 2 × diesel engines; 2 × electric motors
- Speed: 18.3 knots (33.9 km/h; 21.1 mph) surfaced; 7.3 knots (13.5 km/h; 8.4 mph) submerged
- Range: 24,880 nmi (46,080 km; 28,630 mi) at 10 knots (19 km/h; 12 mph) surfaced; 117 nmi (217 km; 135 mi) at 4 knots (7.4 km/h; 4.6 mph) submerged
- Test depth: 230 m (750 ft)
- Complement: 4 officers, 44 enlisted 48 to 56
- Armament: 6 × torpedo tubes (4 bow, 2 stern); 22 × 53.3 cm (21 in) torpedoes; 1 × 10.5 cm (4.1 in) SK C/32 deck gun (180 rounds); 1 × 3.7 cm (1.5 in) SK C/30 AA gun; 1 × twin 2 cm FlaK 30 AA guns

Service record
- Part of: 2nd U-boat Flotilla; 11 February 1941 – 10 April 1944
- Identification codes: M 00 412
- Commanders: K.Kapt. Karl-Freidrich Merten; 11 February 1941 – 21 January 1943; Oblt.z.S. Albert Lauzemis; 21 January – 16 June 1943; Oblt.z.S. Ekkehard Scherraus; 14 June – July 1943; Oblt.z.S. Gerhard Seehausen; July – 29 July 1943; Oblt.z.S. Albert Lauzemis; 30 July 1943 – 10 April 1944
- Operations: 10 patrols: 1st patrol: 30 June – 1 August 1941; 2nd patrol: 11 September – 25 December 1941; 3rd patrol: 11 February – 13 April 1942; 4th patrol: 14 May – 10 July 1942; 5th patrol: 20 August – 6 December 1942; 6th patrol: 3 February – 7 May 1943; 7th patrol: a. 12 – 16 June 1943; b. 1 – 3 August 1943; 8th patrol: 14 – 15 August 1943; 9th patrol: 8 September – 23 December 1943; 10th patrol: 22 March – 10 April 1944
- Victories: 32 merchant ships sunk (197,453 GRT); 1 auxiliary warship sunk (545 GRT)

German submarine U-68 was a Type IXC U-boat of Nazi Germany's Kriegsmarine during World War II. The submarine was laid down on 20 April 1940 at the DeSchiMAG AG Weser yard at Bremen as yard number 987, launched on 22 October and commissioned on 1 January 1941 under the command of Korvettenkapitän Karl-Friedrich Merten as part of 2nd U-boat Flotilla.

U-68 conducted ten combat patrols, sinking 32 merchant ships, for a total of 197,453 gross register tons (GRT); she also sank one auxiliary warship of 545 GRT. She was a member of one wolfpack.

On 10 April 1944, during her tenth patrol, she was sunk northwest of Madeira by US aircraft from the escort carrier Guadalcanal.

== Design ==
German Type IXC submarines were slightly larger than the original Type IXBs. U-68 had a displacement of 1,120 tonnes (1,100 long tons) when at the surface and 1,232 tonnes (1,213 long tons) while submerged. The U-boat had a total length of 76.76 m (251 ft 10 in), a pressure hull length of 58.75 m (192 ft 9 in), a beam of 6.76 m (22 ft 2 in), a height of 9.60 m (31 ft 6 in), and a draught of 4.70 m (15 ft 5 in). The submarine was powered by two MAN M 9 V 40/46 supercharged four-stroke, nine-cylinder diesel engines producing a total of 4,400 metric horsepower (3,240 kW; 4,340 shp) for use while surfaced, two Siemens-Schuckert 2 GU 345/34 double-acting electric motors producing a total of 1,000 metric horsepower (740 kW; 990 shp) for use while submerged. She had two shafts and two 1.92 m (6 ft) propellers. The boat was capable of operating at depths of up to 230 metres (750 ft).

The submarine had a maximum surface speed of 18.3 knots (33.9 km/h; 21.1 mph) and a maximum submerged speed of 7.3 knots (13.5 km/h; 8.4 mph). When submerged, the boat could operate for 63 nautical miles (117 km; 72 mi) at 4 knots (7.4 km/h; 4.6 mph); when surfaced, she could travel 13,450 nautical miles (24,910 km; 15,480 mi) at 10 knots (19 km/h; 12 mph). U-68 was fitted with six 53.3 cm (21 in) torpedo tubes (four fitted at the bow and two at the stern), 22 torpedoes, one 10.5 cm (4.13 in) SK C/32 naval gun, 180 rounds, and a 3.7 cm (1.5 in) SK C/30 as well as a 2 cm (0.79 in) C/30 anti-aircraft gun. The boat had a complement of forty-eight.

== Service history ==
=== First patrol ===
U-68 left Kiel on 30 June 1941 for the Atlantic Ocean via the gap between Iceland and the Faroe Islands. She was unsuccessfully attacked with 24 depth charges by the British corvette Rhododendron west northwest of Cape Finisterre in Spain. She docked at her new base at Lorient, on the French Atlantic coast, on 1 August. She would be based there for the rest of her career.

=== Second patrol ===
Heading for the south Atlantic, the boat came across Silverbelle southwest of the Canary Islands and sank her on 22 September 1941. On 28 September she was involved in an action in Tarrafal Bay, Cape Verde islands, but escaped unscathed. The following month she sank RFA Darkdale while the ship was at anchor off Jamestown, Saint Helena on 22 October. Her third victim, Hazelside, was destroyed on the 28th, 600 nmi (1,100 km; 690 mi) southeast of Saint Helena. U-68 also sank Bradford City west of South West Africa (now Namibia) on 1 November. The U-boat collided with the stricken ship while diving underneath her. The submarine's bow was bent.

Nevertheless, the submarine returned to Lorient on 25 December.

=== Third patrol ===
U-68's third sortie was also conducted off the west coast of Africa. She sank Helenus on 3 March 1942 200 nmi (370 km; 230 mi) south of Freetown in Sierra Leone, followed by Baluchstan on the eighth. The boat's crew were kept busy, sinking Baron Newlands on the 16th and Ile de Batz on the 17th; all the vessels met their end in the vicinity of Liberia.

She also sank Scottish Prince about 180 nmi (330 km; 210 mi) west of Takoradi in Gold Coast and Allende, both on the 17th.

U-68 had turned for home when she sank Muncaster Castle with two torpedoes south southwest of Monrovia. More than ten lifeboats were seen by the Germans; there were 329 survivors.

=== Fourth patrol ===
For her fourth patrol U-68 moved to the Caribbean Sea, leaving Lorient on 14 May 1942. On the night of 5 June she sank MV C.O. Stillman, which at 13,006 GRT was then the world's largest oil tanker.

On the night of 10 June, northeast of the Panama Canal, she torpedoed the 8,581 GRT British freighter Surrey. 5,000 tons of dynamite in the cargo detonated after the ship sank. The shock wave lifted the U-boat out of the water as if she had been hit herself; both diesel engines and the gyrocompass were disabled.

Another victim was Port Montreal. She was sunk with what Merten noted in the boat's war diary as a lucky [torpedo] hit.

In all, U-68 sank seven ships during this patrol before returning to Lorient on 10 July.

=== Fifth patrol ===
The submarine left Lorient on her fifth patrol on 20 August 1942. She would not see her base again until December. At 109 days, this was to be her longest and most successful sally. Heading once more into the South Atlantic, she attacked and sank Trevilley east northeast of Ascension Island on 12 September. The Master and Chief Officer were taken prisoner.

She travelled further south, sinking ships such as Gasterkerk on 8 October and Sarthe on the same date, both in the area of the Cape of Good Hope. She also disposed of Belgian Fighter on the ninth.

Turning for home on 16 October, she sank City of Cairo on 6 November. U-68 returned a month later to Lorient on December 6.

=== Sixth patrol ===
The boat's sixth patrol in the first half of 1943 was again to northern South America. Having sunk two ships, she was attacked by a US Mariner flying boat on 2 April; damage was slight.

=== Seventh and eighth patrols ===
U-68 was attacked by one of four British De Havilland Mosquitos on the western edge of the Bay of Biscay on 14 June 1943. One man was killed, three were wounded

Patrol number eight was relatively uneventful.

=== Ninth patrol ===
The boat returned to her most successful hunting ground - the South Atlantic. In another mammoth patrol (107 days), she sank four more ships.

One of them, the Norwegian tanker Litiopa, had numerous torpedoes and rounds from the deck gun fired at her, but stubbornly refused to succumb. Having been initially encountered at night on 21 October 1943, it was not until the following day that she sank.

The Litiopa's sole escort was the mine-sweeping trawler HMS Orfasy. She was sunk relatively easily on 21 October before the attack on the tanker.

The other two ships were New Columbia, (sunk southwest of Bingerville, Ivory Coast) on 31 October and the French Fort de Vaux on 30 November. The latter vessel met her end after 'Aphrodite' radar decoys had been used to lure the escort vessels away.

U-68's inbound route took her close to the northwest Spanish coast. She docked at Lorient on 23 December 1943.

=== Tenth patrol and loss ===
The boat left Lorient for the last time on 22 March 1944. On 10 April, she was sunk at position 33°24′N 18°59′W, northwest of the Portuguese island of Madeira, by depth charges and rockets from Grumman Avenger and Grumman Wildcat aircraft from the United States escort carrier Guadalcanal.

56 men died; there was one survivor, who was the lookout left top-side when the submarine crash-dived in an attempt to avoid attack.

=== Wolfpacks ===
U-68 took part in one wolfpack, namely:

- Eisbär (25 August - 1 September 1942)

== Summary of raiding history ==
Date	Ship	Nationality	Tonnage (Note: Merchant ship tonnages are in gross register tons. Military vessels are listed by tons displacement.)	Fate
22 September 1941	Silverbelle	United Kingdom	5,302	Sunk
22 October 1941	Darkdale	United Kingdom	8,145	Sunk
28 October 1941	Hazelside	United Kingdom	5,297	Sunk
1 November 1941	Bradford City	United Kingdom	4,953	Sunk
3 March 1942	Helenus	United Kingdom	7,366	Sunk
8 March 1942	Baluchistan	United Kingdom	6,992	Sunk
16 March 1942	Baron Newlands	United Kingdom	3,386	Sunk
17 March 1942	Allende	United Kingdom	5,081	Sunk
17 March 1942	Ile de Batz	United Kingdom	5,755	Sunk
17 March 1942	Scottish Prince	United Kingdom	4,917	Sunk
30 March 1942	Muncaster Castle	United Kingdom	5,853	Sunk
5 June 1942	L.J. Drake	United States	6,693	Sunk
5 June 1942	C.O. Stillman	Panama	13,006	Sunk
10 June 1942	Ardenvohr	United Kingdom	5,025	Sunk
10 June 1942	Port Montreal	United Kingdom	5,882	Sunk
10 June 1942	Surrey	United Kingdom	8,581	Sunk
15 June 1942	Frimaire	Free France	9,242	Sunk
23 June 1942	Arnaga	Panama	2,345	Sunk
12 September 1942	Trevilley	United Kingdom	5,296	Sunk
15 September 1942	Breedijk	Netherlands	6,861	Sunk
8 October 1942	Gaasterkerk	Netherlands	8,679	Sunk
8 October 1942	Koumoundouros	Greece	3,598	Sunk
8 October 1942	Sarthe	United Kingdom	5,271	Sunk
8 October 1942	Swiftsure	United States	8,207	Sunk
9 October 1942	Belgian Fighter	Belgium	5,403	Sunk
9 October 1942	Examelia	United States	4,981	Sunk
6 November 1942	City of Cairo	United Kingdom	8,034	Sunk
13 March 1943	Ceres	Netherlands	2,680	Sunk
13 March 1943	Cities Service Missouri	United States	7,506	Sunk
21 October 1943	HMT Orfasy	Royal Navy	545	Sunk
22 October 1943	Litiopa	Norway	5,356	Sunk
31 October 1943	New Columbia	United Kingdom	6,574	Sunk
30 November 1943	Fort de Vaux	Free France	5,186	Sunk
Total amount of tonnage:			197,998 gross register tons	

== Bibliography ==
- Busch, Rainer; Röll, Hans-Joachim (1999). German U-boat commanders of World War II : a biographical dictionary. Translated by Brooks, Geoffrey. London, Annapolis, Md: Greenhill Books, Naval Institute Press. ISBN 1-55750-186-6.
- Busch, Rainer; Röll, Hans-Joachim (1999). Der U-Boot-Krieg, 1939-1945: Deutsche U-Boot-Verluste von September 1939 bis Mai 1945 [German U-boat losses from September 1939 to May 1945] (in German). Vol. IV. Hamburg, Berlin, Bonn: Mittler. ISBN 3-8132-0514-2.
- Gröner, Eric; Jung, Dieter; Maass, Martin (1991). German Warships 1815-1945: U-boats and Mine Warfare Vessels. Vol. 2. Translated by Thomas, Keith; Magowan, Rachel. London: Conway Maritime. ISBN 0-85177-593-4.
- Blair, Clay (2000). Hitler's U-Boat War: The Hunted, 1942 – 1945. New York: Modern Library. ISBN 0-679-64033-9.
- Dunmore, Spencer (2002). Lost Subs: From the Hunley to the Kursk. The Greatest Submarines Ever Lost – and Found. Cambridge, MA: Da Capo Press. ISBN 0-306-81140-5.
- Morisson, Samuel (1956). The Atlantic Battle Won, May 1943 – May 1945. History of United States Naval Operations in World War II. Vol. X. Boston: Little, Brown and Company. OCLC 768913584.
- Jones, Moira (1995). The Times Atlas of the World (Third, revised ed.). ISBN 0-7230-0809-4.
