= List of shipwrecks in June 1942 =

The list of shipwrecks in June 1942 includes all ships sunk, foundered, grounded, or otherwise lost during June 1942.

== 1 June ==
List of shipwrecks: 1 June 1942
Ship	State	Description
Alegrete	Brazil	World War II: The cargo ship (5,970 GRT) was torpedoed, shelled and sunk in the Atlantic Ocean between St. Lucia and St. Vincent (13°40′N 61°30′W) by U-156 (Kriegsmarine). All hands survived and boarded four lifeboats. Nineteen were rescued by USS Tarbell (United States Navy), the 45 other reached land.
Empire Starlight	United Kingdom	World War II: Convoy PQ 13: The cargo ship was bombed and sunk at Murmansk, Soviet Union by Junkers Ju 87 aircraft of the Luftwaffe. She was salvaged by the Soviets in 1945, repaired and returned to service as Murmansk.
HA-21	Imperial Japanese Navy	World War II: Attack on Sydney Harbour: The Type A Ko-hyoteki-class submarine (46 GRT) was chased by several patrols boatsb in the Sydney harbour and disabled. Both crew members committed suicide. The damaged submarine was found the same day by divers at the bottom of the harbour.
Hampton Roads	United States	World War II: The cargo ship (2,689 GRT) was torpedoed and sunk in the Gulf of Mexico off Cape San Antonio, Cuba (22°45′N 85°13′W), by U-106 (Kriegsmarine) with the loss of five of her 28 crew. Survivors were rescued by Alcoa Pathfinder (United States).
Kohuku Maru	Japan	World War II: The cargo ship was bombed and sunk in the Indian Ocean (16°16′N 98°18′E) by United States Army Air Force aircraft.
HMAS Kuttabul	Royal Australian Navy	HMAS Kuttabul World War II: Attack on Sydney Harbour: The depot ship (447 GRT) was sunk in Sydney Harbour by the explosion of a torpedo fired by M-24b (Imperial Japanese Navy) with the loss of 21 of the sailors aboard.
M-24b	Imperial Japanese Navy	World War II: Attack on Sydney Harbour: The Type A Ko-hyoteki-class submarine (46 GRT) sank after leaving Sydney Harbour. Both crew members were lost. The wreck was found in November 2006 two kilometres (1.2 mi) north of Long Reef, about 20 kilometres (12 mi) north of Sydney Harbour off Bungan Head.
Malmö	Germany	World War II: The coaster struck a mine and sank in the Øresund south west of Malmö, Sweden. She was later salvaged, repaired and returned to service.
PiLB 8	Kriegsmarine	The PiLB 39 Type personnel landing craft was lost on this date.
Subbotnik	Soviet Union	World War II: The cargo liner was sunk at Murmansk by Luftwaffe aircraft. Eight of her crew were killed.
Westmoreland	United Kingdom	World War II: The cargo ship was torpedoed, shelled and sunk in the Atlantic Ocean 240 nautical miles (440 km; 280 mi) north north east of Bermuda (35°55′N 63°35′W) by U-566 (Kriegsmarine) with the loss of three of her 68 crew. Survivors were rescued by Cathcart ( Canada) and Henry R. Mallory (United States).
West Notus	United States	World War II: The Design 1013 ship (5,492 GRT) was shelled and set on fire in the Atlantic Ocean 320 nautical miles (590 km) east of Cape Hatteras, North Carolina (34°10′N 68°20′W) by U-404 (Kriegsmarine). Four of her 40 crew were killed and the rest abandoned the burning ship. The submarine remained in the area and sent the next day a boarding party to the wreck to sink it with explosives. The 36 survivors were rescued by Constantinos H. ( Greece) and Saentis (Switzerland).

== 2 June ==
List of shipwrecks: 2 June 1942
Ship	State	Description
Berganger	Norway	World War II: The cargo ship was torpedoed and sunk in the Atlantic Ocean 130 nautical miles (240 km) south south east of Block Island, Rhode Island, United States (39°24′N 69°50′W) by U-578 (Kriegsmarine) with the loss of four of her 44 crew. Survivors were rescued by Bañaderos (Norway), USS Madison (United States Navy) and the fishing vessel Mary J. Landry (United States).
Illinois	United States	World War II: The cargo ship was torpedoed and sunk in the Atlantic Ocean 400 nautical miles (740 km) north east of Puerto Rico (approximately 24°N 60°W) by U-159 (Kriegsmarine) with the loss of 32 of her 38 crew. Survivors were rescued by Esso Montpelier (United States).
Kaynarea	Turkey	World War II: The sailing ship was sunk by ramming in the Black Sea east of Rezvolo, Bulgaria (42°00′N 28°16′E) by ShCh-214 (Soviet Navy).
Knoxville City	United States	World War II: The cargo ship was torpedoed and sunk in the Caribbean Sea 50 nautical miles (93 km) southeast of Cabo Corrientes, Cuba (21°15′N 83°50′W) by U-158 (Kriegsmarine) with the loss of two of her 55 crew.
Mattawin	United Kingdom	World War II: The cargo ship was torpedoed and sunk in the Atlantic Ocean southeast of New York, United States (40°14′N 66°01′W) by U-553 (Kriegsmarine). All 71 people aboard were rescued by USCGC General Greene ( United States Coast Guard) and Torvanger (Norway).
Mikhail Gromov	Soviet Union	World War II: The tanker was sunk near Yalta by Luftwaffe aircraft. Six of her crew were killed.
Reine Marie Stewart	Panama	World War II: The barque was sunk in the Atlantic Ocean off the west coast of Africa (7°16′N 13°20′W) by Leonardo da Vinci (Regia Marina). Her eleven crew survived.
Triton	Netherlands	World War II: The cargo ship was shelled and sunk in the Atlantic Ocean 470 nautical miles (870 km) south east of Bermuda (26°00′N 59°34′W) by U-558 (Kriegsmarine) with the loss of six of her 36 crew. Survivors were rescued by Mormacport (United States).
U-652	Kriegsmarine	World War II: The Type VIIC submarine (1,070 GRT) was depth charged and damaged in the Gulf of Sollum (31°55′N 25°11′E) by two Fairey Swordfish aircraft of 815 Squadron, Fleet Air Arm. She was scuttled by U-81 (Kriegsmarine) rescued all her 46 crew and then sunk her with a torpedo.
V 1510 Unitas 6	Kriegsmarine	The Vorpostenboot struck a sunken wreck and foundered in the English Channel off Dieppe, Seine-Inférieure, France.

== 3 June ==
List of shipwrecks: 3 June 1942
Ship	State	Description
Aeolus	United States	World War II: The fishing vessel was shelled and sunk in the Atlantic Ocean 170 nautical miles (310 km) off Thatcher's Island, Massachusetts (43°07′N 66°51′W) by U-432 (Kriegsmarine). Her six crew survived.
Anna	Sweden	World War II: The cargo ship (1,345 GRT) was shelled and sunk in the Atlantic Ocean 245 nautical miles (454 km) north west of Bermuda (34°10′N 68°22′W) by U-404 (Kriegsmarine). Her twenty crew were rescued.
Ben and Josephine	United States	World War II: The fishing vessel was shelled and sunk in the Atlantic Ocean 170 nautical miles (310 km) off Thacher Island, Massachusetts (43°07′N 66°51′W) by U-432 (Kriegsmarine). Her eight crew survived.
USS Bunting	United States Navy	The coastal minesweeper collided with USS PC-569 (United States Navy) in San Francisco Bay and sank. Her crew were rescued.
City of Alma	United States	World War II: The cargo ship was torpedoed and sunk in the Atlantic Ocean 400 nautical miles (740 km) north east of San Juan, Puerto Rico (23°00′N 62°30′W) by U-172 (Kriegsmarine) with the loss of 29 of her 39 crew. Survivors were rescued by USS YP-67 (United States Navy).
Coldbrook	United States	The cargo ship became stranded in the Pacific Ocean (50°25′N 146°20′W). She was a total loss.
F 145	Kriegsmarine	World War II: The Type A Marinefahrprahm was sunk by a Soviet mine in the Black Sea (46°32′N 31°15′E) with the loss of nine lives.
Høegh Giant	Norway	World War II: The tanker was torpedoed and damaged in the Atlantic Ocean (6°52′N 42°43′W) by U-126 (Kriegsmarine). Her 39 crew abandoned ship. The ship was torpedoed again the next day and sunk (7°17′N 43°06′W).
Iron Chieftain	Australia	World War II: The ore carrier was torpedoed and sunk in the Tasman Sea, 32 nautical miles (59 km) east of Manly, New South Wales by I-24 (Imperial Japanese Navy) with the loss of twelve of her 39 crew.
King Fisher	United States	The fishing vessel sank off Saint Lazaria Island, Territory of Alaska (56°59′15″N 135°42′00″W).
Lillian	United Kingdom	World War II: The schooner was shelled and sunk in the Atlantic Ocean (12°25′N 59°30′W) by U-156 (Kriegsmarine) with the loss of three of the 25 people aboard.
M. F. Elliott	United States	World War II: The tanker (6,940 GRT) was torpedoed and sunk in the Caribbean Sea 150 nautical miles (280 km) north west of Trinidad (12°04′N 63°49′W) by U-502 (Kriegsmarine) with the loss of thirteen of her 45 crew. Survivors were rescued by Santa Maria ( Brazil) and USS Tarbell (United States Navy).
Steel Worker	United States	World War II: The cargo ship struck a mine and sank in Kola Bay. There were no casualties amongst her 38 crew.

== 4 June ==
List of shipwrecks: 4 June 1942
Ship	State	Description
HMS Cocker	Royal Navy	World War II: The naval whaler, an anti-submarine vessel, was torpedoed and sunk in the Mediterranean Sea off Tobruk, Libya by S-57 (Kriegsmarine). Fifteen of her 31 crew were killed.
Gemstone	United Kingdom	World War II: The cargo ship was captured by Stier (Kriegsmarine), in the South Atlantic Ocean 200 nautical miles (370 km) east of St. Paul's Rocks, Brazil (1°52′N 26°38′W). Gemstone was then scuttled by Stier with torpedoes with the loss of nineteen of her 43 crew.
Iron Crown	Australia	World War II: The ore carrier was torpedoed and sunk in the Bass Strait off Cape Howe 44 miles (71 km) south-southwest of Gabo Island, New South Wales (38°17′S 149°44′E) by I-27 (Imperial Japanese Navy). Her master, a gunner, and 36 of her crew were killed. Five of her crew were rescued by Mulbera (India).
Kaga	Imperial Japanese Navy	World War II: Battle of Midway: The Kaga-class aircraft carrier, a converted Tosa-class battleship, was bombed and damaged in the Pacific Ocean off Midway Island by Douglas SBD Dauntless aircraft based on USS Enterprise (United States Navy) with the loss of 811 of her 1,708 crew. Survivors were rescued by Hagikaze and Maikaze (both Imperial Japanese Navy). Kaga was consequently scuttled at 30°20′N 179°17′W by Hagikaze. Her wreck was located in 2019.
Katharina Dorothea Fritzen	Germany	World War II: The cargo ship struck a mine and sank off Borkum.
King Fisher	United States	motor schooner sank 5 nautical miles (9.3 km) off Lazaroff Island, Territory of Alaska, with the loss of three lives. The sole survivor, her captain, was rescued by a United States Navy patrol craft.
Nidarnes	Norway	World War II: The cargo ship was torpedoed and sunk in the Atlantic Ocean (21°17′N 85°07′W) by U-158 (Kriegsmarine) with the loss of thirteen of her 24 crew. Survivors were rescued by Curaca (United States).
Northwestern	United States	Northwestern World War II: Battle of Dutch Harbor: Beached and serving as a civilian barracks ship, the Passenger ship was bombed and set on fire at Dutch Harbor, Territory of Alaska, by aircraft from Jun'yō and Ryūjō (both Imperial Japanese Navy), becoming a constructive total loss.
Reginaldo Giuliani	Italy	World War II: The Gino Allegri-class cargo ship was bombed and damaged in the Mediterranean Sea by Allied aircraft. She was taken in tow by Freccia (Regia Marina) but sank off Benghazi, Libya the next day. All 225 people on board survived.
Sōryū	Imperial Japanese Navy	World War II: Battle of Midway: The Sōryū-class aircraft carrier was bombed and damaged in the Pacific Ocean (30°38′N 179°13′W) by Douglas SBD Dauntless aircraft from USS Yorktown (United States Navy) with the loss of 711 of her 1,103 crew. Survivors were rescued by Hamakaze and Isokaze (both Imperial Japanese Navy). Sōryū was scuttled by Isokaze.
Toyohashi Maru	Imperial Japanese Army	World War II: The Toyohashi Maru-class transport ship was torpedoed and sunk in the Malacca Strait (07°14′N 98°06′E) by HMS Trusty (Royal Navy) with a loss of a crew member and sixteenm gunners. Survivors were rescued by Kyokusei Maru (Imperial Japanese Army).

== 5 June ==
List of shipwrecks: 5 June 1942
Ship	State	Description
Akagi	Imperial Japanese Navy	World War II: Battle of Midway: The Akagi-class aircraft carrier, a converted Amagi-class battlecruiser, was bombed and damaged in the Pacific Ocean off Midway Island by Douglas SBD Dauntless aircraft based on USS Enterprise (United States Navy), with the loss of 268 of her 2,000 crew. She was scuttled the next day by Arashi, Hagikaze, Maikaze and Nowaki (all Imperial Japanese Navy).
Atlantic Gulf	Panama	World War II: The cargo ship was torpedoed and sunk in the Mozambique Channel, 350 nautical miles (650 km) east of Beira, Mozambique (21°03′S 37°36′E) by I-10 (Imperial Japanese Navy).
C. O. Stillman	Panama	World War II: The tanker was torpedoed and sunk in the Caribbean Sea (17°33′N 67°55′W) by U-68 (Kriegsmarine) with the loss of three of her 55 crew. Thirty survivors sailed to the Dominican Republic in two lifeboats; 25 were rescued from four life rafts by the patrol boat 83310 ( United States Coast Guard).
Delfina	United States	World War II: The cargo ship was torpedoed and sunk in the Atlantic Ocean 130 nautical miles (240 km) north north west of San Juan, Puerto Rico (20°22′N 67°07′W by U-172 (Kriegsmarine) with the loss of four of her 31 crew. Survivors were rescued by USS YP-67 (United States Navy) or reached land in their lifeboat.
Elysia	United Kingdom	World War II: The cargo ship was shelled and torpedoed in the Indian Ocean 350 nautical miles (650 km) east north east of Durban, Union of South Africa (27°19′S 37°01′E) by Hokoku Maru and Aikoku Maru (both Imperial Japanese Navy) with the loss of 22 lives. She was torpedoed and sunk four days later by a Japanese submarine.
Hiryū	Imperial Japanese Navy	Hiryū World War II: Battle of Midway: The Hiryū-class aircraft carrier was bombed and sunk in the Pacific Ocean by Douglas SBD Dauntless aircraft based on USS Yorktown (United States Navy) with the loss of almost 400 of her 1,126 crew. Survivors were rescued by Kazagumo and Makigumo (both Imperial Japanese Navy). The United States Navy rescued 35 of her crew, who were detained as prisoners of war.
Johnstown	Panama	World War II: The cargo ship was torpedoed and sunk in the Indian Ocean (13°12′S 42°06′E) by I-20 (Imperial Japanese Navy) with the loss of two of her 44 crew.
L. J. Drake	United States	World War II: The tanker was torpedoed and sunk in the Caribbean Sea (17°30′N 68°20′W) by U-68 (Kriegsmarine) with the loss of all 41 crew.
Maria da Glória	Portugal	World War II: The schooner was shelled and sunk in the Atlantic Ocean off the coast of Greenland by U-94 (Kriegsmarine) with the loss of 36 of her 44 crew. Survivors were rescued by USCGC Sea Cloud ( United States Coast Guard).
Melvin H. Baker	United States	World War II: The cargo ship was torpedoed and sunk in the Mozambique Channel, Indian Ocean 350 miles (560 km) east of Beira (21°44′S 36°38′E) by I-10 (Imperial Japanese Navy). Survivors rescued by Twickenham (United Kingdom).
Paracury	Brazil	World War II: The schooner was shelled and sunk in the Caribbean Sea south of the Dominican Republic (17°30′N 68°34′W) by U-159 (Kriegsmarine). She was later salvaged, repaired and returned to service.
Sally	Honduras	World War II: The sailing ship was shelled and sunk in the Caribbean Sea (16°45′N 70°15′W) by U-159 (Kriegsmarine) with the loss of all four hands.
Sonja Maersk	United Kingdom	The cargo ship was wrecked off Duncan's Cove, Nova Scotia, Canada (44°29′N 63°32′W). Her crew survived.
Sumiyoshi Maru No. 8	Imperial Japanese Navy	World War II: The guard ship was torpedoed and damaged off Truk by USS Pompano. Despite assistance from Shoko Maru (Imperial Japanese Navy) the flooding couldn't be contained. Before midnight the crew transferred without loss to Shoko Maru.
Velma Lykes	United States	World War II: The Design 1099 ship was torpedoed and sunk in the Yucatan Channel 20 nautical miles (37 km) off Puerto Juárez, Quintana Roo, Mexico (21°21′N 86°36′W) by U-158 (Kriegsmarine) with the loss of fifteen of her 32 crew. Survivors were rescued by Ardenvohr (United Kingdom).

== 6 June ==
List of shipwrecks: 6 June 1942
Ship	State	Description
Antares	Netherlands	World War II: The cargo ship was sunk by a mine.
Castilla	Honduras	World War II: The cargo ship (3,910 GRT) was torpedoed and sunk in the Caribbean Sea (20°15′N 83°18′W) by U-107 (Kriegsmarine) with the loss of 23 of the 59 people aboard (21 grew and 2 gunners). One of the 36 survivors died aboard a raft before the others were rescued by USCGC Nike ( United States Coast Guard) six days later.
USS Hammann	United States Navy	USS Hammann World War II: Battle of Midway: The Sims-class destroyer was torpedoed and sunk in the Pacific Ocean near Midway Atoll by I-168 (Imperial Japanese Navy) with the loss of more than 80 of her 192 crew.
Koto Maru	Imperial Japanese Navy	The Koto Maru-class auxiliary transport ship ran aground on the south east tip of Uruppu-To, Kuriles (45°30′N 150°00′E). She was refloated on 26 August 1942. Subsequently repaired and returned to service.
Luigi Torelli	Regia Marina	World War II: The Marconi-class submarine was bombed and damaged in the Bay of Biscay by Consolidated PBY Catalina aircraft of 10 Squadron, Royal Australian Air Force. She was beached to prevent sinking at Santander, Spain. A crew member was killed and another was wounded. Temporary repairs were completed and the ship was refloated on 14 July and headed to France for permanent repairs.
Mikuma	Imperial Japanese Navy	Mikuma World War II: Battle of Midway: The Mogami-class cruiser was bombed and sunk in the Pacific Ocean near Midway Atoll by Douglas SBD Dauntless aircraft based on USS Enterprise and USS Hornet (both United States Navy), with the loss of 700 of her 892 crew. Her captain died of his wounds on 13 June. Survivors were rescued by Arashio, Asashio and Mogami (all Imperial Japanese Navy). USS Trout (United States Navy) took two crew as prisoners of war on 9 June.
Stanvac Calcutta	Panama	World War II: The tanker was gunned, torpedoed and sunk in the South Atlantic Ocean about 500 nautical miles (930 km) off the coast of Brazil by Stier (Kriegsmarine). Thirteen of her 51 crew were killed The survivors were captured, one of them died of wounds sustained.
Susak	Yugoslavia	World War II: The cargo ship was torpedoed, shelled and sunk in the Indian Ocean (15°42′S 40°58′E) by I-16 (Imperial Japanese Navy) with the loss of seven of her 34 crew.

== 7 June ==
List of shipwrecks: 7 June 1942
Ship	State	Description
Chile	United Kingdom	World War II: The cargo ship was torpedoed and sunk in the Atlantic Ocean (04°17′N 13°48′W) by Leonardo da Vinci (Regia Marina) with the loss of five of her 44 crew.
Coast Trader	United States	World War II: The cargo ship (3,545 GRT) was torpedoed and sunk 35 nautical miles (65 km) south west of Cape Flattery, Washington (48°19′N 125°40′W) by I-26 (Imperial Japanese Navy). All 56 crew evacuated safely the ship but one died of exposure in the lifeboat. The 55 survivors were rescued by Virginia I (United States) and HMCS Edmundston (Royal Canadian Navy).
Edith	United States	World War II: The cargo ship was torpedoed and sunk in the Caribbean Sea 200 nautical miles (370 km) south east of Jamaica (14°33′N 74°35′W) by U-159 (Kriegsmarine) with the loss of two of her 31 crew.
USS Gannet	United States Navy	World War II: The seaplane tender, a former Lapwing-class minesweeper, was torpedoed and sunk in the Atlantic Ocean (35°50′N 65°38′W) by the submarine U-653 (Kriegsmarine) with the loss of fourteen of her 76 crew. Survivors were rescued by USS Hamilton (United States Navy) and a Martin PBM Mariner aircraft of the United States Navy.
Hermis	Panama	World War II: The cargo ship was torpedoed and sunk in the Gulf of Mexico (23°08′N 84°42′W) by U-158 (Kriegsmarine) with the loss of one of her 47 crew. Survivors were rescued by USAT Toloa (United States Army).
João Pessõa	Germany	The cargo ship struck a rock and sank 2 nautical miles (3.7 km) off San Sebastián, Spain.
Sebastiano Veniero	Regia Marina	World War II: The Marcello-class submarine was bombed and sunk in the Mediterranean Sea (38°21′N 03°21′E) in two separate attacks by Consolidated PBY Catalina aircraft of 240 Squadron, Royal Air Force with the loss of all 58 hands.
HMS Sona	Royal Navy	World War II: The armed yacht was sunk at Poole, Dorset by a German delayed-action bomb.
Suwied	United States	World War II: The cargo ship was torpedoed and sunk in the Caribbean Sea 140 nautical miles (260 km) south east of Cozumel, Mexico (20°00′N 84°48′W) by U-107 (Kriegsmarine) with the loss of six of the 33 people aboard. Survivors were rescued by USCGC Nemesis ( United States Coast Guard).
Wilford	Norway	World War II: The cargo ship was shelled and sunk in the Indian Ocean (20°27′S 36°37′E) by I-18 (Imperial Japanese Navy) with the loss of nine of her 44 crew. Two of the survivors were rescued by a Marinha Portuguesa gunboat, the rest reached land in their lifeboats.
USS Yorktown	United States Navy	USS Yorktown capsizing and sinking World War II: Battle of Midway: The Yorktown-class aircraft carrier capsized and sank in the Pacific Ocean off Midway Atoll after being hit by three bombs dropped by dive bombers from Hiryū (Imperial Japanese Navy) on 4 June and by two torpedoes fired by I-168 (Imperial Japanese Navy) on 6 June.

== 8 June ==
List of shipwrecks: 8 June 1942
Ship	State	Description
Aghios Georgios IV	Greece	World War II: The cargo ship was shelled and sunk in the Indian Ocean (16°12′S 41°00′E) by I-16 (Imperial Japanese Navy) with the loss of seven of her 31 crew.
Antoniotto Usodimare	Regia Marina	World War II: The Navigatori-class destroyer was torpedoed and sunk in the Sicilian Channel by Alagi (Regia Marina) with the loss of 141 of her 306 crew.
Christos Markettos	Greece	World War II: The cargo ship was torpedoed and sunk in the Indian Ocean (05°05′S 40°53′E) by I-20 (Imperial Japanese Navy) with the loss of two of her 37 crew.
Esther	Palestine	World War II: The sailing ship was shelled and sunk in the Mediterranean Sea off Sidon, Lebanon by U-83 (Kriegsmarine).
King Lud	United Kingdom	World War II: The cargo ship was torpedoed and sunk in the Mozambique Channel 350 nautical miles (650 km) east of Beira, Mozambique (20°00′S 40°00′E) by I-10 (Imperial Japanese Navy). Lost with all 39 military passengers and her crew.
Pleasantville	Norway	World War II: The cargo ship was torpedoed and sunk in the Atlantic Ocean (34°12′N 68°00′W) by U-135 (Kriegsmarine) with the loss of two of her 38 crew. Survivors were rescued by Chicakasaw City (United States) and Paderewski (Poland).
Rosenborg	United Kingdom	World War II: The cargo ship was torpedoed and sunk in the Caribbean Sea east of the Yucatan Peninsula, Mexico (18°47′N 85°05′W) by U-504 (Kriegsmarine) with the loss of four of her 27 crew. Survivors were rescued by Geisha (Norway).
Said	Egypt	World War II: The coaster was shelled and sunk in the Mediterranean Sea 15 nautical miles (28 km) southwest of Jaffa, Palestine by U-83 (Kriegsmarine) with the loss of five of her 14 crew.
USAT Sicilien	United States Army	World War II: The cargo ship was torpedoed and sunk in the Atlantic Ocean 10 nautical miles (19 km) south of Cape Beata, Dominican Republic (17°30′N 71°20′W) by U-171 (Kriegsmarine) with the loss of 46 of the 77 people aboard.
South Africa	Norway	World War II: The tanker was torpedoed and sunk in the Atlantic Ocean (12°47′N 49°44′W) by U-128 (Kriegsmarine) with the loss of six of her 42 crew.
Sperrbrecher 15 Taronga	Kriegsmarine	World War II: The Sperrbrecher (7,003 GRT) was severely damaged off Scharhörn by Allied aircraft with the loss of two lives and was beached. She was towed some days later into Hamburg where she was declared a constructive total loss and was consequently decommissioned, being not repaired during the rest of the war. She was returned to her Norwegian owners post-war, was repaired and returned to service in August 1948.
Tela	Honduras	World War II: The cargo ship was torpedoed and sunk in the Caribbean Sea (18°15′N 85°20′W) by U-504 (Kriegsmarine) with the loss of eleven of her 54 crew. Survivors were rescued by Hiloa (Colombia) and Port Montreal (United Kingdom).
Wilford	Norway	World War II: The cargo ship was shelled and sunk in the Mozambique Channel (20°20′S 36°47′E) by I-18 (Imperial Japanese Navy).

== 9 June ==
List of shipwrecks: 9 June 1942
Ship	State	Description
Bruxelles	Belgium	World War II: Convoy TO 5: The cargo ship was torpedoed and sunk in the Caribbean Sea 35 nautical miles (65 km) northeast of Cape Blanco, Venezuela (11°05′N 66°41′W) by U-502 (Kriegsmarine) with the loss of one of her 54 crew.
Franklin K. Lane	United States	World War II: Convoy TO 5: The tanker was torpedoed and damaged in the Caribbean Sea 35 nautical miles (65 km) northeast of Cape Blanco (11°12′N 66°39′W) by U-502 (Kriegsmarine) with the loss of four of her 41 crew. Survivors were rescued by HMS Churchill (Royal Navy), which scuttled Franklin K. Lane as she was considered a hazard to navigation.
Husky	United States	The motor boat sank 2 nautical miles (3.7 km; 2.3 mi) off Cape Constantine, Territory of Alaska.
Kronprinsen	Norway	World War II: Convoy BX 23A: The cargo ship, on her maiden voyage, was torpedoed, severely damaged and set afire in the Atlantic Ocean at 42°53′N 67°11′W by U-432 (Kriegsmarine). Kronprinzen was taken in tow and beached at West Pubnico, Nova Scotia, Canada. She was subsequently repaired and returned to service.
M-18b	Imperial Japanese Navy	World War II: The Type A Ko-hyoteki-class submarine was jettisoned in the Mozambique Channel by I-18 (Imperial Japanese Navy) due to an engine failure.
USAT Merrimack	United States Army	World War II: The Design 1099 troopship (2,606 GRT) was torpedoed and sunk in the Caribbean Sea 60 nautical miles (110 km) off Cozumel, Mexico (19°47′N 85°55′W) by U-107 (Kriegsmarine) with the loss of 44 lives (the master, 34 crew members, eight armed guards and one US Army passenger). The ten survivors were rescued by Argentina (United States) and USS Borie (United States Navy).
Mimosa	Free French Naval Forces	World War II: Convoy ON 100: The Flower-class corvette was torpedoed and sunk in the Atlantic Ocean by U-124 (Kriegsmarine) with the loss of 65 of her 69 crew. Survivors were rescued by HMCS Assiniboine (Royal Canadian Navy).
Stureborg	Sweden	World war II: The cargo ship (1,661 GRT) was torpedoed and sunk in the Mediterranean Sea south west of Cyprus by Regia Aeronautica aircraft. The ship sailed with Red Cross aid for Greece, and was on the way to Haifa Palestine to fetch wheat for Greece. Ten crew and a Swiss Red Cross representative died in the sinking. Ten survivors managed to get onto a raft, but only one survived until it reached land near Gaza, Egypt 19 days later.
Typhoon	Palestine	World War II: The sailing ship was shelled and sunk in the Mediterranean Sea 4 nautical miles (7.4 km) west of Sidon, Lebanon by U-83 (Kriegsmarine). Her crew survived.
Zaffiro	Regia Marina	World War II: The Sirena-class submarine was bombed and sunk in the Mediterranean Sea (38°21′N 03°21′E) in two separate attacks by Consolidated PBY Catalina aircraft of 240 Squadron, Royal Air Force with the loss of all 49 hands.

== 10 June ==
List of shipwrecks: 10 June 1942
Ship	State	Description
Abkhaziya	Soviet Union	World War II: The passenger ship was bombed and sunk at Sevastopol by Junkers Ju 88 aircraft of the Luftwaffe. Eight of her crew were killed. The wreck was raised and scrapped in 1951.
Alioth	Netherlands	World War II: The cargo ship was torpedoed, shelled, and sunk in the Atlantic Ocean (0°08′N 18°52′W) by Leonardo da Vinci (Regia Marina) with the loss of eight of her 36 crew.
Ardenvohr	United Kingdom	World War II: The cargo ship was torpedoed and sunk in the Caribbean Sea (12°45′N 80°20′W) by U-68 (Kriegsmarine) with the loss of one of her 54 crew. The survivors, and all seventeen survivors from Velma Lykes (United States), were rescued by USS Barry, USS Edison (both United States Navy) and Flora (Netherlands).
Athene	Norway	World War II: Convoy AT 49: The tanker was torpedoed and sunk in the Mediterranean Sea (31°12′N 28°10′E) by U-558 (Kriegsmarine) with the loss of fourteen of her 31 crew.
RFA Brambleleaf	Royal Fleet Auxiliary	World War II: The tanker was torpedoed and damaged in the Mediterranean Sea (31°12′N 28°10′E) by U-558 (Kriegsmarine) with the loss of seven of her 60 crew. Survivors abandoned ship were rescued by Vasilissa Olga (Hellenic Navy). RFA Brambleleaf was subsequently towed to Alexandria, Egypt and used as a hulk. She sank on 15 September 1944 and was declared a total loss. She was scrapped at La Spezia, Italy in April 1953.
Empire Clough	United Kingdom	World War II: Convoy ON 100: The cargo ship was torpedoed and sunk in the Atlantic Ocean by U-94 (Kriegsmarine) with the loss of five of her 49 crew. She was on her maiden voyage. Survivors were rescued by the fishing trawler Argus (Portugal) and HMS Dianthus (Royal Navy).
Haugarland	Norway	World War II: The cargo ship struck a mine in the North Sea off Terschelling, Friesland, Netherlands. She sank the next day.
Havre	United Kingdom	World War II: Convoy AT 49: The tanker was torpedoed and sunk in the Mediterranean Sea 50 nautical miles (93 km) west of Alexandria, Egypt by U-81 (Kriegsmarine) with the loss of twenty of her 50 crew. Survivors were rescued by HMT Parktown (Royal Navy).
L. A. Christensen	Norway	World War II: The cargo ship (4,362 GRT) was torpedoed and sunk in the Atlantic Ocean (27°44′N 63°54′W) by U-129 (Kriegsmarine). Her 31 crew were rescued by Bill (Norway).
Port Montreal	United Kingdom	World War II: The cargo ship was torpedoed and sunk in the Atlantic Ocean (12°17′N 80°20′W) by U-68 (Kriegsmarine) with the loss of two of the 88 people aboard. Her 45 crew survived, as well as 41 of the 43 survivors from Tela (Honduras). They were rescued by the schooner Hiloa (Colombia).
Ramsay	United Kingdom	World War II: Convoy ON 100: The cargo ship was torpedoed and sunk in the Atlantic Ocean (51°53′N 34°59′W) by U-94 (Kriegsmarine) with the loss of 40 of her 48 crew. Survivors were rescued by HMS Vervain (Royal Navy).
Surrey	United Kingdom	World War II: The cargo ship was torpedoed and sunk in the Atlantic Ocean (12°45′N 80°20′W) by U-68 (Kriegsmarine) with the loss of twelve of her 67 crew. Survivors were rescued by Flora (Netherlands), Potomac (Panama) and the schooner Resolute (Colombia).
Svobodney	Soviet Navy	World War II: The Soobrazitelnyy-class destroyer was bombed and sunk in South Bay, Sevastopol by Junkers Ju 88 aircraft of the Luftwaffe.

== 11 June ==
List of shipwrecks: 11 June 1942
Ship	State	Description
American	United States	World War II: The cargo ship was torpedoed and sunk in the Caribbean Sea off the coast of Honduras (17°58′N 84°28′W) by U-504 (Kriegsmarine) with the loss of four of her 38 crew. Survivors were rescued by Kent (United Kingdom).
Ardeal	Romania	World War II: The cargo ship was torpedoed and damaged in the Black Sea (46°32′50″N 30°56′30″E) by A-5 (Soviet Navy) and was beached. Ardeal was subsequently refloated and taken in to Constanţa. She was repaired post-war, and returned to service in 1948.
Crijnssen	Netherlands	World War II: The passenger ship was torpedoed and sunk in the Caribbean Sea (18°14′N 82°11′W) by U-504 (Kriegsmarine) with the loss of one of the 93 people aboard. Survivors were rescued by Lebore (United States).
Fort Good Hope	United Kingdom	World War II: The Fort ship, on her maiden voyage, was torpedoed and sunk in the Atlantic Ocean (10°19′N 80°16′W) by U-159 (Kriegsmarine) with the loss of two of her 47 crew. Survivors were rescued by USS Erie (United States Navy).
F. W. Abrams	United States	World War II: The tanker struck three American mines and sank off Ocracoke, North Carolina (34°49′N 75°48′W). Her 36 crew safely left the ship and reached the coast. The wreck was sold for scrapping in August 1954.
Geo H. Jones	United Kingdom	World War II: Convoy SL 111: The tanker straggled behind the convoy. She was torpedoed and sunk in the Atlantic Ocean (45°40′N 22°40′W) by U-455 (Kriegsmarine) with the loss of two of the 42 people aboard. Survivors were rescued by HMIS Orissa ( (United Kingdom) Royal Indian Navy).
Hagan	United States	World War II: The tanker was torpedoed and sunk in the Atlantic Ocean 5 nautical miles (9.3 km) off the north coast of Cuba (22°00′N 77°30′W) by U-157 (Kriegsmarine) with the loss of six of her 44 crew.
Lylepark	United Kingdom	World War II: The cargo ship was shelled and sunk in the South Atlantic Ocean by Michel (Kriegsmarine) with the loss of 23 of her 44 crew. Nineteen of the survivors were taken as prisoners of war.
Mahronda	United Kingdom	World War II: The cargo ship was torpedoed and sunk in the Indian Ocean (14°37′S 40°58′E) by I-20 (Imperial Japanese Navy) with the loss of one of the 157 people on board.
MRS 11 Osnabruck	Kriegsmarine	World War II: The support ship was mined and sunk off Tallinn, Estonia. Eighty-four crewmen were killed. She was later salvaged, repaired and returned to service.
Pontypridd	United Kingdom	World War II: Convoy ON 100: The cargo ship straggled behind the convoy. She was torpedoed and damaged in the Atlantic Ocean by U-569 (Kriegsmarine). She was then torpedoed and sunk (49°50′N 41°37′W) by U-94 (Kriegsmarine) with the loss of two of her 46 crew. Survivors were rescued by HMCS Chambly (Royal Canadian Navy) apart from her captain, who was taken aboard U-569 as a prisoner of war.
Shéhérazade	Panama	World War II: The tanker was torpedoed and sunk in the Gulf of Mexico (28°41′N 91°20′W) by U-158 (Kriegsmarine) with the loss of one of her 59 crew. Survivors were rescued by the fishing vessels Midshipman and 40 Fathoms (both United States).

== 12 June ==
List of shipwrecks: 12 June 1942
Ship	State	Description
Bojan	Sweden	World War II: The cargo ship (1,272 GRT) struck a minein the Baltic Sea off Saßnitz, Germany. The whole crew was rescued and she was towed to Saßnitz and beached, and was later declared a total loss.
Burma Maru	Japan	World War II: The cargo ship was torpedoed and sunk in the Gulf of Siam (10°08′N 112°34′E) by USS Swordfish (United States Navy). The wreck was discovered in February 2017 by an international team of divers.
Cities Service Toledo	United States	World War II: The tanker was torpedoed and sunk in the Gulf of Mexico (29°02′N 91°59′W) by U-158 (Kriegsmarine) with the loss of fifteen of her 45 crew. Survivors were rescued by Belinda (Norway), Gulfking (United States) and San Antonio (Panama).
Cliftonhall	United Kingdom	World War II: The cargo ship as torpedoed and sunk in the Indian Ocean (16°25′S 40°10′E) by I-20 (Imperial Japanese Navy) with the loss of two of her 43 crew.
Dartford	United Kingdom	World War II: Convoy ONS 100: The cargo ship was torpedoed and sunk in the Atlantic Ocean (49°19′N 41°33′W) by U-124 (Kriegsmarine) with the loss of 30 of her 47 crew. Survivors were rescued by Gothland (United Kingdom).
HMS Grove	Royal Navy	World War II: Convoy MW 11: The Hunt-class destroyer was torpedoed and sunk in the Mediterranean Sea off the coast of Egypt (32°05′N 25°30′E) by U-77 (Kriegsmarine) with the loss of 110 of her 170 crew. Survivors were rescued by HMS Tetcott (Royal Navy).
Guatemala	Panama	World War II: The cargo ship (5,527 GRT) was torpedoed and sunk in the Pacific Ocean off Cape Three Points, Australia by I-21 (Imperial Japanese Navy). Her crew were rescued by HMAS Doomba (Royal Australian Navy).
Hardwicke Grange	United Kingdom	World War II: The cargo ship was torpedoed and sunk in the Atlantic Ocean 120 nautical miles (220 km) north of Puerto Rico (25°45′N 65°45′W) by U-129 (Kriegsmarine) with the loss of three of her 78 crew. Survivors were rescued by Athelprince (United Kingdom) and another ship, or reached land in their lifeboats.
Hellenic Trader	Panama	World War II: The cargo ship was shelled and sunk in the Indian Ocean (14°40′S 40°53′E) by I-20 (Imperial Japanese Navy) with the loss of nine of her 42 crew.
M 4212 Marie-Frans	Kriegsmarine	World War II: The auxiliary minesweeper struck a mine and sank in the Bay of Biscay. Eleven of her crew were killed.
Senta	Sweden	World War II: The cargo ship (1,497 GRT) was sunk in the North Sea off the mouth of the Weser by aircraft of Coastal Command, Royal Air Force. Her eighteen crew survived.

== 13 June ==
List of shipwrecks: 13 June 1942
Ship	State	Description
Brabant	Netherlands	World War II: The motor vessel (345 GRT) was sunk by German aircraft in Bristol Channel 10 miles south of Hartland Point. The entire crew survived and reached land in the lifeboat.
CB-5	Regia Marina	World War II: The CB-class midget submarine (36 GRT) was torpedoed and sunk by D-3 (Soviet Navy) in Yalta Harbor, Soviet Union. She was not manned at the time and there was no casualty.
Clan Macquarrie	United Kingdom	World War II: The cargo ship was torpedoed and sunk in the Atlantic Ocean (5°30′N 22°30′W) by Leonardo da Vinci (Regia Marina) with the loss of one of her 90 crew.
HMS Farouk	Royal Navy	World War II: The Q-ship was shelled and sunk in the Mediterranean Sea off Al-Ramkin Island, Lebanon (34°19′N 35°44′E) by U-83 (Kriegsmarine) with the loss of nine of her eighteen crew.
Gruzyia	Soviet Union	World War II: The transport ship was bombed and sunk at Sevastopol by Luftwaffe aircraft. Her cargo of ammunition exploded. Many sources say between 3,500 and 4,000 crew and troops on board were killed, but according to recent Soviet articles there were around 700 people aboard (crew, medical unit and troops) and only 15 survived.
Shch-405	Soviet Navy	World War II: The Shchuka-class submarine struck a mine and sank in the Gulf of Finland. Her wreck was located in 2018.
SKA-092	Soviet Navy	World War II: The MO-4-class patrol vessel was bombed and sunk at Sevastopol by Luftwaffe aircraft.
SP-40	Soviet Navy	World War II: The motor vessel was bombed and sunk at Sevastopol by Luftwaffe aircraft.
Sixaola	United States	World War II: The passenger ship was torpedoed and sunk in the Caribbean Sea 50 nautical miles (93 km) off Bocas del Toro, Panama (9°41′N 81°10′W) by U-159 (Kriegsmarine) with the loss of 29 of the 201 people aboard. Survivors were rescued by Carolinian (United States) and USS Niagara (United States Navy) or reached land in their lifeboats and liferafts.
Solon Turman	United States	World War II: The cargo ship was torpedoed and sunk in the Caribbean Sea 100 nautical miles (190 km) north of Cristóbal, Canal Zone (10°45′N 80°24′W) by U-159 (Kriegsmarine) with the loss of one of her 53 crew. Survivors were rescued by the schooners Envoy and Zaroma (both Colombia).
Sumiyoshi Maru No. 8 Go	Imperial Japanese Navy	The auxiliary picket boat sprang a leak and sank, or was scuttled, the next day, probably in the Yokosuka area. Her crew were rescued by Shoko Maru (Imperial Japanese Navy).
Supetar	Yugoslavia	World War II: The cargo ship was torpedoed and sunk in the Indian Ocean 100 nautical miles (190 km) south of Beira, Mozambique.
T-413	Soviet Navy	World War II: The Project 58 type minesweeper was bombed and sunk at Cape Fiolenx by Junkers Ju 87 aircraft of the Luftwaffe.
TsCh-27	Soviet Navy	World War II: The transport ship was bombed and sunk at Sevastopol by Luftwaffe aircraft.
U-157	Kriegsmarine	World War II: The Type IXC submarine was depth charged and sunk in the Atlantic Ocean north east of Havana, Cuba (24°13′N 82°03′W) by USCGC Thetis ( United States Coast Guard) with the loss of all 52 crew.

== 14 June ==
List of shipwrecks: 14 June 1942
Ship	State	Description
Aagtekerk	Netherlands	World War II: Convoy MW 11: The cargo ship was bombed and sunk in the Mediterranean Sea north of Tobruk, Libya (31°01′30″N 24°39′00″E) by Junkers Ju 87 and Junkers Ju 88 aircraft of the Luftwaffe.
Bhutan	United Kingdom	World War II: Convoy MW 11: The cargo ship was bombed and sunk in the Mediterranean Sea (34°00′N 23°40′E) by Junkers Ju 88 aircraft of Lehrgeschwader 1, Luftwaffe.
Gunvor	Norway	World War II: The cargo ship struck a mine and sank in the Atlantic Ocean 25 nautical miles (46 km) north of the Key West Lighthouse, Florida, United States (25°00′N 81°45′W) with the loss of two of her 22 crew.
HMS Hasty	Royal Navy	World War II: Operation Vigorous: The H-class destroyer was torpedoed and damaged in the Mediterranean Sea off Sirte, Libya by S-55 (Kriegsmarine). She was scuttled on 15 June by HMS Hotspur (Royal Navy).
Kaaparen	Sweden	World War II: Convoy HX 194: The cargo ship (3,392 GRT) collided with Tungsha (Norway) at Halifax, Nova Scotia, Canada as the convoy was forming and consequently sank 3 nautical miles (5.6 km) off the Halifax East Lightship ( Trinity House). Her crew and passengers were all rescued.
Lebore	United States	World War II: The cargo ship was torpedoed and sunk in the Caribbean Sea 200 nautical miles (370 km) north of Cristóbal, Panama (12°53′N 80°40′W) by U-172 (Kriegsmarine) with the loss of one of the 94 people aboard. Survivors, including all those from Crijnssen (Netherlands), were rescued by USS Erie and USS Tattnall (both United States Navy).
HMS Liverpool	Royal Navy	World War II: The Town-class cruiser was torpedoed and severely damaged in the Mediterranean Sea by Savoia-Marchetti SM.79 aircraft of the Regia Aeronautica. She was taken in tow by HMS Antelope (Royal Navy). Repairs took until July 1943 to complete.
HM MTB 259	Royal Navy	The ELCO 70'-class motor torpedo boat sank in the Mediterranean Sea while being towed from Malta to Alexandria, Egypt.
Olivia	Netherlands	World War II: The tanker was shelled and sunk in the Indian Ocean (26°00′S 77°00′E) by Thor (Kriegsmarine). One crewman rescued by Thor. Four Dutchmen and 8 Chinese left in a boat, but only three Dutchmen and one of the Chinese survived the journey to Madagascar, arriving on 13 July. A total of 41 crew died.
Potaro	United Kingdom	World War II: The cargo ship was bombed and damaged in the Mediterranean Sea 450 nautical miles (830 km) east of Malta. She was subsequently repaired and returned to service.
Regent	Latvia	World War II: The cargo ship was torpedoed and sunk in the Caribbean Sea 200 nautical miles (370 km) south west of the Cayman Islands (17°50′N 84°10′W) by U-504 (Kriegsmarine) with the loss of eleven of her 25 crew.
Tanimbar	Netherlands	World War II: The ship was torpedoed and sunk in the Mediterranean Sea (37°50′N 6°44′E) by Savoia-Marchetti SM.79 aircraft of the Regia Aeronautica with the loss of 23 of her 88 crew.

== 15 June ==
List of shipwrecks: 15 June 1942
Ship	State	Description
HMS Airedale	Royal Navy	World War II: Operation Vigorous: The Hunt-class destroyer was bombed and damaged in the Mediterranean Sea south of Crete, Greece (33°50′N 24°00′E) by Junkers Ju 87 aircraft of the Luftwaffe with the loss of 45 of her 178 crew. She was scuttled the next day by HMS Aldenham (Royal Navy).
HMS Bedouin	Royal Navy	HMS Bedouin World War II: Operation Harpoon: The Tribal-class destroyer was disabled by naval gunfire from Raimondo Montecuccoli and Eugenio di Savoia (both Regia Marina), torpedoed by Savoia-Marchetti SM.79 aircraft of the Regia Aeronautica and sunk in the Mediterranean Sea off Pantelleria, with the loss of 28 of her 241 crew.
Bennestvet	Norway	World War II: The cargo ship was torpedoed and sunk in the Caribbean Sea (10°47′N 82°12′W) by U-172 (Kriegsmarine) with the loss of twelve of her 25 crew. Survivors were rescued by USS PC-458 (United States Navy).
Burdwan	United Kingdom	World War II: Operation Harpoon: The cargo ship was bombed and damaged in the Mediterranean Sea 35 nautical miles (65 km) south of Pantellaria by Junkers Ju 87 and Junkers Ju 88 aircraft of Sturzkampfgeschwader 3, Luftwaffe with the loss of three of the 125 people on board. After a botched attempt by HMS Badsworth (Royal Navy) to scuttle Burdwan when towing her back to the convoy became untenable, she was consequently abandoned. Burdwan was finished off by Ascari, Eugenio di Savoia, Oriani and Raimondo Montecuccoli (all Regia Marina).
Cardina	Panama	World War II: The cargo ship was torpedoed and sunk in the South Atlantic off the coast of Brazil (4°45′N 40°55′W) by Archimede (Regia Marina). Her 34 crew survived.
Chant	United States	World War II: Operation Harpoon, Convoy WS 19Z: The cargo ship was bombed and damaged in the Mediterranean Sea (36°25′N 11°40′E) by aircraft of Sturzkampfgeschwader 3, Luftwaffe with the loss of four of the 85 people on board. She was consequently abandoned.
City of Oxford	United Kingdom	World War II: Convoy HG 84: The cargo ship was torpedoed and sunk in the Atlantic Ocean west of Cape Finisterre, Spain (43°42′N 18°12′W) by U-552 (Kriegsmarine) with the loss of one of her 43 crew. Survivors were rescued by Stockport (United Kingdom).
Cold Harbor	Panama	World War II: The Design 1022 ship was torpedoed and sunk in the Caribbean Sea 100 nautical miles (190 km) north west of Trinidad (11°40′N 62°55′W) by U-502 (Kriegsmarine) with the loss of seven of her 51 crew. Survivors were rescued by Exmouth, Kahula (both United States) and USS Opal (United States Navy).
Dutch Princess	United Kingdom	World War II: The sailing ship was shelled and sunk in the Atlantic Ocean (13°46′N 60°06′W) by U-126 (Kriegsmarine). Her nine crew survived.
Etrib	United Kingdom	World War II: Convoy HG 84: The cargo ship was torpedoed and sunk in the Atlantic Ocean west of A Coruña, Spain (43°18′N 17°38′W) by U-552 (Kriegsmarine) with the loss of four of the 45 people aboard. Survivors were rescued by HMS Marigold (Royal Navy).
Frimaire	Vichy France	World War II: The tanker was torpedoed and sunk in the Caribbean Sea (11°50′N 73°40′W) by U-68 (Kriegsmarine) with the loss of all 60 crew.
F.W. Abrams	United States	F.W. Abrams sinking after hitting a mine World War II: After hiding from German U-Boats in a minefield off of Cape Hatteras, the tanker was being escorted by the United States Coast Guard out of the minefield when it lost sight of the escort and struck a mine, sinking approximately 11 nautical miles (20 km) off the coast of Ocracoke, North Carolina (34°59′N 75°48′W). All on board survived.
Kentucky	United Kingdom	Kentucky on fire after being shelled by the Italian naval squadron World War II: Operation Harpoon: The tanker was bombed and crippled in the Mediterranean Sea (36°7′N 12°10′E) by Junkers Ju 87 and Junkers Ju 88 aircraft of Sturzkampfgeschwader 3, Luftwaffe. After a botched attempt by the minesweeper HMS Hebe (Royal Navy) to scuttle Kentucky when towing her back to the convoy became untenable, the tanker was abandoned. She was sunk by Ascari, Eugenio di Savoia, Raimondo Montecuccoli and Oriani (all Regia Marina).
HMT Kingston Ceylonite	Royal Navy	World War II: Convoy KN 109: The naval trawler struck a mine and sank in Chesapeake Bay (36°52′N 75°51′W) off Virginia Beach, Virginia, United States with the loss of eighteen of her 32 crew.
M-95	Soviet Navy	World War II: The M-class submarine was sunk by a mine. The wreck was located in 2015.
HM MTB 201	Royal Navy	World War II: the White 73'-class motor torpedo boat was shelled and damaged by German surface craft. She later sank whilst under tow.
HMS Newcastle	Royal Navy	World War II: The Town-class cruiser was torpedoed and damaged in the Mediterranean Sea by S 56 (Kriegsmarine). Repairs took until March 1943 to complete.
Nampo Maru	Imperial Japanese Navy	World War II: The auxiliary gunboat was torpedoed and sunk off Corregidor, Philippines (14°00′N 120°00′E) by USS Seawolf (United States Navy).
HMAS Nestor	Royal Australian Navy	HMAS Nestor World War II: Operation Vigorous: The N-class destroyer was bombed and damaged in the Mediterranean Sea off Crete by Regia Aeronautica aircraft with the loss of four of her crew. She was taken in tow by HMS Javelin (Royal Navy) but was scuttled the next day.
Pelayo	United Kingdom	World War II: Convoy HG 84: The cargo ship was torpedoed and sunk in the Atlantic Ocean 400 nautical miles (740 km) north west of A Coruña (43°18′N 17°38′W by U-552 (Kriegsmarine) with the loss of seventeen of the 47 people aboard. Survivors were rescued by Copeland (United Kingdom).
RD 7	Regia Marina	World War II: The RD-class minesweeper was sunk off "Saronikus" by a mine.
Robert C. Tuttle	United States	World War II: Convoy KN 109: The tanker struck a mine and sank in Chesapeake Bay (36°52′N 75°51′W) with the loss of one of her 47 crew. Survivors were rescued by USS PC-474 (United States Navy). Robert C. Tuttle was later salvaged, repaired and returned to service.
Scottsburg	United States	World War II: The cargo ship was torpedoed and sunk in the Caribbean Sea 90 nautical miles (170 km) west of Grenada (11°51′N 62°56′W) by U-502 (Kriegsmarine) with the loss of five of her 51 crew. Survivors were rescued by Kahuku (United States).
RFA Slemdal	Royal Fleet Auxiliary	World War II: Convoy HG 84: The tanker was torpedoed and sunk in the Atlantic Ocean 400 nautical miles (740 km) west north west of A Coruña (43°18′N 17°38′W) by U-552 (Kriegsmarine). Her 37 crew were rescued by Copeland (United Kingdom) and HMS Marigold (Royal Navy).
Thurso	United Kingdom	World War II: The cargo ship was torpedoed and sunk in the Atlantic Ocean 300 nautical miles (560 km) off Cape Finisterre, Spain (43°41′N 18°02′W) by U-552 (Kriegsmarine) with the loss of thirteen of her 41 crew. Survivors were rescued by HMS Marigold (Royal Navy).
Trento	Regia Marina	World War II: The Trento-class cruiser was torpedoed and damaged by a Bristol Beaufort aircraft of 217 Squadron, Royal Air Force. She was then torpedoed and sunk by HMS Umbra (Royal Navy). There were 570 dead and 581 survivors.
West Hardaway	United States	World War II: The cargo ship was torpedoed and sunk in the Caribbean Sea 30 nautical miles (56 km) west of Grenada (11°50′N 62°15′W) by U-502 (Kriegsmarine). Her 50 crew were rescued by Maracaibo (Venezuela).
No. 61	Soviet Navy	The G-5-class motor torpedo boat was lost on this date.

== 16 June ==
List of shipwrecks: 16 June 1942
Ship	State	Description
Argo	Finland	World War II: The cargo ship (2,513 GRT) was torpedoed and sunk in the Gulf of Finland between Bogskär and Utö (59°21′N 20°14′E) by ShCh-317 (Soviet Navy) with the loss of nine of her crew.
Arkansan	United States	World War II: The cargo ship was torpedoed and sunk in the Atlantic Ocean 70 nautical miles (130 km) west of Grenada (12°07′N 62°51′W) by U-126 (Kriegsmarine) with the loss of four of her 40 crew. Survivors were rescued by USS Pastores (United States Navy).
Bilbao	Germany	World War II: The cargo ship struck a mine and sank in the Weser.
Cherokee	United States	World War II: Convoy XB 25: The passenger ship was torpedoed and sunk in the Atlantic Ocean northeast of Cape Cod, Massachusetts, and 50 nautical miles (93 km; 58 mi) northeast of Provincetown, Massachusetts, (42°25′N 069°10′W) by U-87 (Kriegsmarine) with the loss of 86 of the 169 people aboard. Survivors were rescued by USCGC Escanaba ( United States Coast Guard) and Norlago (United States).
Coldbrook	United States	World War II: The cargo ship was destroyed by Imperial Japanese Navy forces near Middleton Island about 75 nautical miles (139 km; 86 mi) south of Cordova, Territory of Alaska. Some reports indicate she was sunk, others that she was beached on Middleton Island and abandoned there after salvage efforts failed.
HMS Hermione	Royal Navy	World War II: Operation Vigorous / Convoy MW 11: The Dido-class cruiser was torpedoed and sunk in the Mediterranean Sea south of Crete, Greece (33°20′N 26°00′E) by U-205 (Kriegsmarine) with the loss of 87 of her 527 crew. Survivors were rescued by HMS Aldenham, HMS Beaufort and HMS Exmoor (all Royal Navy).
Kahuku	United States	World War II: The cargo ship was torpedoed and sunk in the Atlantic Ocean 90 nautical miles (170 km) west of Grenada (11°54′N 63°07′W) by U-126 (Kriegsmarine) with the loss of seventeen of the 109 people aboard. Survivors were rescued by Minataora (Venezuela), USS Opal and USS YP-63 (both United States Navy).
ORP Kujawiak	Polish Navy	World War II: Operation Harpoon: The Hunt-class destroyer struck a mine and sank in the Mediterranean Sea near Malta with the loss of thirteen of her 160 crew.
Managua	Nicaragua	World War II: The cargo ship was torpedoed and sunk in the Straits of Florida (24°05′N 81°40′W) by U-67 (Kriegsmarine). Her 25 crew survived.
Nueva Altagracia	Dominican Republic	World War II: The sailing ship was shelled and sunk in the Caribbean Sea (13°27′N 68°35′W) by U-161 (Kriegsmarine). Her eight crew survived.
Port Nicholson	United Kingdom	World War II: Convoy XB 25: The cargo ship was torpedoed and sunk in 700 feet (210 m) of water in the Atlantic Ocean off Cape Cod, Massachusetts, 30 nautical miles (56 km; 35 mi) east of Provincetown, Massachusetts, (42°11′N 069°25′W) by U-87 (Kriegsmarine), with the loss of six of her 91 crew.
HMT Tranquil	Royal Navy	The 130-foot (40 m), 294-ton minesweeping naval trawler was sunk off The Downs (51°13′N 1°28′E) in a collision with Deal (United Kingdom) while towing a barrage balloon. The balloon survived the sinking, continuing to fly above the wreck causing the wreck to be known as The Balloon Wreck.

== 17 June ==
List of shipwrecks: 17 June 1942
Ship	State	Description
Macdhui	United Kingdom	World War II: The cargo ship was bombed and damaged at Port Moresby, Papua New Guinea by Japanese aircraft. She was attacked again the next day and caught fire with the loss of eleven lives. Macdhui drifted on to a reef off Tatana Island and capsized. She was a total loss.
Millinocket	United States	World War II: The cargo ship was torpedoed and sunk in the Atlantic Ocean off La Isabela, Cuba (23°12′N 79°58′W) by U-129 (Kriegsmarine) with the loss of eleven of her 35 crew. Survivors were rescued by Cuban fishing vessels.
Moira	Norway	World War II: The tanker (1,560 GRT) was torpedoed, shelled and sunk in the Gulf of Mexico east south east of Port Isabel, Texas, United States (25°35′N 96°20′W) by U-158 (Kriegsmarine) with the loss of one of her nineteen crew. Survivors were rescued by American fishing vessels.
San Blas	Panama	World War II: The cargo ship was torpedoed and sunk in the Gulf of Mexico (25°26′N 95°33′W) by U-158 (Kriegsmarine) with the loss of 30 of her 44 crew. Survivors were rescued by a Consolidated PBY Catalina aircraft of the United States Navy.
Santore	United States	World War II: Convoy KS 511: The cargo ship struck a mine and sank in Chesapeake Bay (36°52′N 75°51′W) with the loss of three of her 46 crew. Survivors were rescued by United States Coast Guard vessels. The wreck was scrapped in 1954.
HMS Wild Swan	Royal Navy	World War II: The W-class destroyer was bombed and disabled in the Bay of Biscay by Luftwaffe Junkers Ju 88 aircraft; the destroyer eventually sank after colliding with a Spanish fishing trawler, with the loss of 31 of her crew.

== 18 June ==
List of shipwrecks: 18 June 1942
Ship	State	Description
Belostok	Soviet Union	World War II: The cargo liner was sunk near Balaklava by S 102 (Kriegsmarine) with the loss of 388 passengers and crew.
Flora	Netherlands	World War II: The cargo ship was shelled and sunk in the Caribbean Sea (11°55′N 72°36′W) by U-159 (Kriegsmarine) with the loss of one of the 37 people aboard.
Motorex	United Kingdom	World War II: The tanker was shelled and sunk in the Caribbean Sea north west of Colón, Panama (10°10′N 81°30′W) by U-172 (Kriegsmarine) with the loss of one of her 21 crew.
Seattle Spirit	United States	World War II: Convoy ONS 102: The tanker (5,627 GRT) was torpedoed and damaged in the Atlantic Ocean (50°24′N 42°37′W) by U-124 (Kriegsmarine) with the loss of four of her 55 crew. Survivors were rescued by HMCS Agassiz (Royal Canadian Navy), which scuttled the ship.
Turquoise	Germany	World War II: The cargo ship ran aground in the English Channel six nautical miles (11 km) off Port-en-Bessin-Huppain, Calvados, France and was wrecked. She was being chased by Royal Navy steam gun boats at the time of her loss.
Pleasentville	Norway	World War II: The motor merchant was sunk 190 nautical miles northwest of Bermuda (34° 12'N, 68° 00'W) by U-135 1941 (2) (Kriegsmarine) with a loss of 2 crew.

== 19 June ==
List of shipwrecks: 19 June 1942
Ship	State	Description
Ante Matkovic	Yugoslavia	World War II: The cargo ship was shelled and sunk in the Caribbean Sea (11°35′N 72°55′W) by U-159 (Kriegsmarine) with the loss of six of her 29 crew.
Bosiljka	Yugoslavia	World War II: The cargo ship was sunk by an American mine in the Gulf of Mexico north north west of Key West, Florida, United States (24°57′N 81°57′W). Her 32 crew survived.
Carlotta	Italy	World War II: The cargo ship was sunk by a mine in the Adriatic Sea. There were twelve survivors.
Cheerio	United States	World War II: The schooner (35 GRT) was shelled and sunk in the Caribbean Sea off Mona, Puerto Rico (18°02′N 67°40′W) by U-107 (Kriegsmarine). Her nine crew were all rescued by USS CG-459 (United States Navy).
MFK-2263	Germany	World War II: The fishing schooner was sunk by a mine in the Sea of Azov near Mariopul, Soviet Union. Two of her crew were killed.
Nissan Maru	Imperial Japanese Navy	World War II: The Koshin Maru-class auxiliary collier/oiler was bombed and sunk in the Aleutian Islands, Territory of Alaska (52°30′N 176°30′E), by three Boeing B-17 Flying Fortress, four Consolidated B-24 Liberator and one LB-30 Liberator aircraft of the United States Army Air Forces 11th Air Force. One of her crew was killed when bombed and damaged on 15 June.
Orion	Denmark	World War II: The cargo ship was torpedoed and sunk in the Baltic Sea off Visby, Sweden by Shch-317 (Soviet Navy) with the loss of one of her 22 crew.
R-41	Kriegsmarine	World War II: The Type R-41 minesweeper was torpedoed and sunk in the Seine Estuary by Albrighton, HM SGB 6, HM SGB 7 and HM SGB 8 (all Royal Navy).
USS S-27	United States Navy	The S-class submarine ran aground on St. Makarias Point, Kiska, Territory of Alaska. Efforts to refloat her failed and she was abandoned on 25 June.
HM SGB 7	Royal Navy	World War II: The steam gun boat (175/255 t, 1942) was shelled and sunk in the Seine Bay by R 41 (Kriegsmarine).
ShCh-214	Soviet Navy	World War II: The Shchuka-class submarine was torpedoed and sunk in the Black Sea near Cape Ai-Todor by MAS 571 (Regia Marina). Thirty-nine crew and all passengers (between 40 and 65 evacuees from Sebastopol) died. Two of her crew survived and were taken as prisoners of war, but one died in captivity.
USS YP-389	United States Navy	Photo mosaic of USS YP-389's wreck in 2009. World War II: The naval trawler (170 GRT) was shelled and sunk in the Atlantic Ocean 20 nautical miles (37 km) south-southeast of Cape Hatteras, North Carolina (34°50′N 75°20′W), by U-701 (Kriegsmarine) with the loss of six of her 24 crew.

== 20 June ==
List of shipwrecks: 20 June 1942
Ship	State	Description
Cabo Vilano	Spain	World War II: The cargo ship was torpedoed and sunk off the coast of Brazil by a submarine.
Danubius	Romania	World War II: The barge hit a mine laid by L-6 (Soviet Navy) and sank in the Black Sea off Ak-Mechet, Crimea.
HMS LCT 119	Royal Navy	World War II: The LCT Mk 2-class Landing craft tank was lost off Tobruk, Libya.
HMS LCT 150	Royal Navy	World War II: The LCT Mk 2-class landing craft tank was lost off Tobruk.
Nortind	Norway	World War II: The tanker was torpedoed and damaged in the Gulf of Mexico (28°41′N 89°34′W) by U-69 (Kriegsmarine). Nortind put back to New Orleans, Louisiana, United States. She was subsequently repaired and returned to service.
Senzan Maru	Japan	The cargo ship struck a reef and was stranded 3 nautical miles (5.6 km) southwest of Toseki Port Lighthouse, Formosa, China. She was refloated the next day.
West Ira	United States	World War II: The cargo ship (5,681 GRT) was torpedoed and sunk in the Atlantic Ocean 120 nautical miles (220 km) south east of Barbados by U-128 (Kriegsmarine) with the loss of one of her 49 crew. Survivors were rescued by Macuba (Netherlands) or reached land in their lifeboats.

== 21 June ==
List of shipwrecks: 21 June 1942
Ship	State	Description
Alcoa Cadet	United States	World War II: The cargo ship struck a mine, broke in two and sank in the Kola Inlet off Murmansk, Soviet Union with the loss of one of her 34 crew.
Eknö	Sweden	World War II: The ore carrier (1,859 GRT) struck a mine off the estuary of the Weser and was abandonned without casualty by her crew. She sank during the night.
Keijo Maru	Imperial Japanese Navy	World War II: The Standard Peacetime Type C cargo ship/Heijo Maru-class auxiliary gunboat was torpedoed and sunk in the Pacific Ocean south of Guadalcanal, Solomon Islands (09°00′S 160°00′E) by USS S-44 (United States Navy) with the loss of 63 of her 125 crew. Survivors were rescued by W-20 (Imperial Japanese Navy).
Lina Matkovic	Yugoslavia	World War II: The cargo ship struck a mine and sank off Cristóbal. Panama with the loss of five of her 28 crew.
HMS P514	Royal Navy	World War II: The R-class submarine was rammed and sunk in the Atlantic Ocean by HMCS Georgian (Royal Canadian Navy) with the loss of all 29 crew.
HMSAS Parktown	South African Navy	World War II: The auxiliary minesweeper was torpedoed and sunk in the Mediterranean Sea off Tobruk, Libya by Kriegsmarine E-boats with the loss of a crew member.
Reichenfels	Germany	World War II: The cargo ship was torpedoed in the Mediterranean Sea off the Kerkennah Islands, Tunisia (34°43′N 11°58′E) by Bristol Beaufighter aircraft of the Royal Air Force. She exploded and sank.
Strale	Regia Marina	World War II: The Freccia-class destroyer was damaged by Fairey Swordfish aircraft of the Royal Navy and run aground at "Ras el Amar" to prevent sinking. A crew member was killed, there were 222 survivors. Efforts to refloat her were unsuccessful. The wreck was torpedoed and destroyed by HMS Turbulent (Royal Navy) on 6 August 1942.
No. 125	Soviet Navy	The MO-4-class patrol vessel was lost on this date.
No. 0155	Soviet Navy	The MO-4-class patrol vessel (50/56 t, 1941) was lost on this date.

== 22 June ==
List of shipwrecks: 22 June 1942
Ship	State	Description
Ada Gorthon	Sweden	World War II: The cargo ship (2,399 GRT) was torpedoed and sunk in the Baltic Sea west of Gotland (57°09′N 18°00′E) by the submarine Shch-317 (Soviet Navy) with the loss of fourteen of her 22 crew.
Bromelia	United Kingdom	The 126.2-foot (38.5 m), 242-ton trawler sank off the east coast of Iceland following an explosion, lost with all 13 crew. The sinking was witnessed by a U-boat that reported an explosion, either internal or a mine, she did not take credit for the sinking.
E. J. Sadler	United States	World War II: The tanker was sunk by gunfire in the Caribbean Sea (15°36′N 67°52′W) by U-159 (Kriegsmarine). Her 36 crew were rescued by USS Biddle (United States Navy).
Laura	United States	The tug was destroyed by fire at Wood Island, in the Territory of Alaska.
Rio Tercero	Argentina	World War II: The tanker was torpedoed and sunk in the Atlantic Ocean 120 nautical miles (220 km) southeast of New York, United States (39°15′N 72°32′W) by U-202 (Kriegsmarine) with the loss of five of her 42 crew.
Sperrbrecher 14 Brockenheim	Kriegsmarine	World War II: The Sperrbrecher struck a mine in the Bay of Biscay off Royan, Charente-Inférieure, France, and was severely damaged. Declared a total loss, she was scuttled as a blockship on 25 August.
No. 73	Soviet Navy	The Sh-4 Type motor torpedo boat was lost.
No. 83	Soviet Navy	The Sh-4 Type motor torpedo boat was lost.

== 23 June ==
List of shipwrecks: 23 June 1942
Ship	State	Description
Arriaga	Panama	World War II: The tanker was torpedoed and sunk in the Caribbean Sea (13°08′N 72°16′W) by U-68 (Kriegsmarine) with the loss of one of her 25 crew. Survivors were rescued by a Colombian fishing vessel.
RFA Andrea Brøvig	Royal Fleet Auxiliary	World War II: The tanker was torpedoed, shelled and sunk in the Caribbean Sea off Trinidad (12°10′N 59°10′W) by U-128 (Kriegsmarine). Her 40 crew survived.
USAT Major General Henry Gibbins	United States Army	World War II: The Design 1013 ship was torpedoed and sunk in the Gulf of Mexico 375 nautical miles (694 km) west of Key West, Florida (24°35′N 87°45′W) by U-158 (Kriegsmarine). All 68 people aboard survived.
Rawleigh Warner	United States	World War II: The tanker was torpedoed and sunk in the Gulf of Mexico 50 miles (80 km) south of South Pass, Louisiana (28°53′N 89°15′W) by U-67 (Kriegsmarine) with the loss of all 33 crew.
Resolute	Colombia	World War II: The schooner was stopped and sunk in the Caribbean Sea (13°15′N 80°30′W) by U-172 (Kriegsmarine) with the loss of six of her ten crew.
Sant' Antonio	Italy	World War II: The cargo ship was torpedoed and sunk in the Mediterranean Sea 4 nautical miles (7.4 km) off the coast of Libya (31°53′N 16°35′E) by HMS Thrasher (Royal Navy) with the loss of four of her 35 crew.
Smishlionny	Soviet Navy	World War II: The Soobrazitelnyy-class destroyer was mined and sunk in the Black Sea.
Sperrbrecher 183 Quack	Kriegsmarine	World War II: The Sperrbrecher struck a mine and sank in the North Sea north of Dunkerque, Nord, France.
Torvanger	Norway	World War II: The cargo ship was torpedoed and sunk in the Atlantic Ocean (39°40′N 41°30′W) by U-84 (Kriegsmarine) with the loss of four of her 37 crew. Some of the survivors were rescued by Ruys (Netherlands); others reached land in their lifeboat.

== 24 June ==
List of shipwrecks: 24 June 1942
Ship	State	Description
HMS Gossamer	Royal Navy	World War II: The Halcyon-class minesweeper was bombed and sunk off the Kola Inlet (68°59′N 33°03′E) by Junkers Ju 87 aircraft of I Staffeln, Sturzkampfgeschwader 5, Luftwaffe.
John R. Williams	United States	World War II: The tugstruck a mine and sank in the Atlantic Ocean off Cape May, New Jersey (38°45′N 74°50′W) by U-373 (Kriegsmarine) with the loss of fourteen of her eighteen crew. Survivors were rescued by USS YP-334 (United States Navy).
Ljubica Matkovic	Yugoslavia	World War II: The cargo ship was torpedoed and sunk in the Atlantic Ocean (34°30′N 75°40′W) by U-404 (Kriegsmarine). Her 30 crew survived.
Manuela	United States	World War II: The cargo ship was torpedoed and damaged by U-404 (Kriegsmarine) in the Atlantic Ocean 75 nautical miles (139 km) east of Cape Lookout, North Carolina (34°30′N 75°40′W) with the loss of two of her 43 crew. Survivors were rescued by USS CG-408, USS CG-483 (both United States Navy) and HMT Norwich City (Royal Navy). USS CG-252 (United States Navy) took Manuela in tow but she foundered the next day.
Regulus	Italy	World War II: The cargo ship was sunk in the Gulf of Sirte, 4 nautical miles (7.4 km) west of Qaminis, Libya by HMS Turbulent (Royal Navy). There were no casualties.
Willimantic	United Kingdom	World War II: The cargo ship was torpedoed and sunk in the Atlantic Ocean (25°55′N 51°58′W) by U-156 (Kriegsmarine) with the loss of six of her 38 crew. Her captain was taken aboard U-156 as a prisoner of war. Other survivors were rescued by Tamerlane (Norway) or reached land in their lifeboats.

== 25 June ==
List of shipwrecks: 25 June 1942
Ship	State	Description
Anglo Canadian	United Kingdom	World War II: The cargo ship was torpedoed and sunk in the Atlantic Ocean (25°12′N 55°31′W) by U-153 (Kriegsmarine) with the loss of one of her 50 crew.
Nordal	Panama	World War II: The cargo ship was torpedoed and sunk in the Atlantic Ocean 75 nautical miles (139 km) east of Cape Lookout, North Carolina, United States (34°20′N 75°40′W) by U-404 (Kriegsmarine). Her 32 crew survived.
Yamakaze	Imperial Japanese Navy	Yamakaze seen from the periscope of USS Nautilus World War II: The Shiratsuyu-class destroyer was torpedoed and sunk in the Pacific Ocean 60 miles (97 km) south of Yokosuka, Kanagawa (34°34′N 140°26′E) by USS Nautilus (United States Navy) with the loss of all 227 hands.
No. 3	Soviet Navy	World War II: The floating battery was bombed and sunk at Sevastopol by Luftwaffe aircraft.

== 26 June ==
List of shipwrecks: 26 June 1942
Ship	State	Description
A-1	Soviet Navy	World War II: The AG-class submarine was scuttled at Sevastopol.
Avionia	Italy	The cargo ship caught fire in the port of Heraklion, Greece, and was scuttled. There were no casualties.
Bezuprechny	Soviet Navy	World War II: The Gnevny-class destroyer was bombed and sunk in the Black Sea south of The Crimea by Junkers Ju 88 aircraft of the Luftwaffe.
Jagersfontein	Netherlands	World War II: The cargo liner (10,083 GRT) was torpedoed and sunk in the Atlantic Ocean (32°02′N 54°53′W) by U-107 (Kriegsmarine). All 220 people aboard survived and were rescued by St Cergue (Switzerland).
Matagalpa	United States Army	The cargo ship, an extensively rebuilt former Clemson-class destroyer, caught fire at Sydney, New South Wales, Australia. She was not repaired, and was scuttled in 1947.
Pedrinhas	Brazil	World War II: The cargo ship (3,666 GRT) was torpedoed, shelled and sunk in the Atlantic Ocean 300 nautical miles (560 km) north east of Puerto Rico (23°07′N 62°06′W) by U-203 (Kriegsmarine). Her 48 crew all survived.
Putney Hill	United Kingdom	World War II: The cargo ship was torpedoed and sunk in the Atlantic Ocean 450 nautical miles (830 km) north east of Puerto Rico (24°20′N 63°16′W) by U-203 (Kriegsmarine) with the loss of three of her 38 crew. Survivors were rescued by HMS Saxifrage (Royal Navy).
Quand Méme	France	World War II: The fishing boat (28 GRT) struck a mine and sank in the Bay of Biscay off Capbreton. Four of her eight crew were killed.
S-32	Soviet Navy	World War II: The Soviet S-class submarine (840 GRT) was bombed and sunk by a Luftwaffe He 111 from 2./KG 100 in the Black Sea (44°12′N 33°48′E) with the loss of all 48 hands.
Tamesis	Norway	World War II: The cargo ship was torpedoed and damaged in the Atlantic Ocean off Cape Hatteras, North Carolina, United States. She was abandoned by her crew, but some of them later reboarded her and beached her in the Hatteras Inlet. She was later repaired and returned to service.
Yakobinets	Soviet Navy	World War II: The Dekabrist-class submarine was scuttled at Sevastopol.

== 27 June ==
List of shipwrecks: 27 June 1942
Ship	State	Description
Las Choapas	Mexico	World War II: The tanker was torpedoed and sunk in the Gulf of Mexico north of Tecotutla (20°15′N 96°20′W) by U-129 (Kriegsmarine) with the loss of four of her 32 crew.
RFA Leiv Eiriksson	Royal Fleet Auxiliary	World War II: The tanker (9,952 GRT) was torpedoed and sunk in the Atlantic Ocean west of Barbados (13°18′N 59°57′W) by U-126 (Kriegsmarine). Two of her 44 crew died in the flames and two others died of their burns after being rescued.
MO-201	Soviet Navy	World War II: The MO-class guard ship was sunk off Seiskari by Luftwaffe aircraft.
Moldanger	Norway	World War II: The cargo ship was torpedoed and sunk in the Atlantic Ocean 300 nautical miles (560 km) south east of Philadelphia, Pennsylvania, United States (38°03′N 70°52′W) by U-404 (Kriegsmarine) with the loss of fourteen of her 44 crew. Survivors were rescued by HMCS Buctouche (Royal Canadian Navy), USS PC-495 (United States Navy) and Washington Express (Norway).
Polybius	United States	World War II: The cargo ship was torpedoed and sunk in the Atlantic Ocean (10°55′N 57°40′W) by U-128 (Kriegsmarine) with the loss of ten of her 44 crew. Survivors were rescued by Clarona (Flag unknown) and Draco (Netherlands).
Potlatch	United States	World War II: The cargo ship was torpedoed and sunk in the Atlantic Ocean (19°20′N 53°18′W) by U-153 (Kriegsmarine) with the loss of eight of her 55 crew.
Tuxpam	Mexico	World War II: The tanker was torpedoed, shelled and sunk in the Gulf of Mexico 40 nautical miles (74 km) north east of Gutiérrez Zamora (20°15′N 96°20′W) by U-129 (Kriegsmarine) with the loss of eight of her 31 crew.
No. 061	Soviet Navy	The MO-4-class patrol vessel was lost on this date.
No. 112	Soviet Navy	The G-5-class motor torpedo boat was lost on this date.

== 28 June ==
List of shipwrecks: 28 June 1942
Ship	State	Description
Frielinghaus	Germany	World War II: The cargo ship struck a mine and sank off Borkum.
Hattie B	United States	The fishing vessel sank off Cape Ommaney, Alaska Territory (56°10′00″N 134°40′20″W).
Memas	Greece	World War II: Convoy Metril: The cargo ship was torpedoed and sunk in the Mediterranean Sea 14 nautical miles (26 km) south south west of Haifa, Palestine (32°27′N 34°43′E) by U-97 (Kriegsmarine) with the loss of eight of her 25 crew.
Queen Victoria	United Kingdom	World War II: The cargo ship was torpedoed and sunk in the Mozambique Channel east of Beira, Mozambique (21°15′S 40°30′E) by I-10 (Imperial Japanese Navy) with the loss of all 48 of her crew.
Raphael Semmes	United States	World War II: The cargo ship was torpedoed and sunk in the Atlantic Ocean 875 nautical miles (1,620 km) east of Cape Canaveral, Florida (29°30′N 64°30′W) by U-332 (Kriegsmarine) with the loss of a passenger and eighteen crewmen. Survivors were rescued by Explorer (United States) on 16 July.
Saikyo Maru	Imperial Japanese Navy	World War II: The auxiliary gunboat was torpedoed and sunk in the Pacific Ocean 190 nautical miles (350 km) north of Yap, Caroline Islands (12°41′N 136°22′E) by USS Stingray (United States Navy).
Savona	Kriegsmarine	The transport ship struck a sunken wreck in the Mediterranean Sea off Benghazi, Libya and was consequently beached at Sidi Buciedo. She was a total loss.
Sam Houston	United States	World War II: The Liberty ship, on her maiden voyage, was torpedoed, shelled and sunk in the Caribbean Sea (19°21′N 62°22′W) by U-203 (Kriegsmarine) with the loss of eight of her 46 crew. Survivors were rescued by USS Courier (United States Navy).
Sea Thrush	United States	World War II: The cargo ship was torpedoed and sunk in the Atlantic Ocean 425 nautical miles (787 km) north east of San Juan, Puerto Rico (22°38′N 60°59′W) by U-505 (Kriegsmarine). Her 66 crew were rescued by USS Surprise (United States Navy).
Sperrbrecher 165 Frielinghaus	Germany	World War II: The sperrbrecher struck a mine and sank in the North Sea off the Frisian Islands.
Tillie Lykes	United States	World War II: The Design 1099 ship was torpedoed and sunk in the Caribbean Sea 100 nautical miles (190 km) south of Santo Domingo, Dominican Republic (16°57′N 69°45′W) by U-154 (Kriegsmarine) with the loss of all 33 crew.
SS William Rockefeller	United States	World War II: The tanker was torpedoed and damaged in the Atlantic Ocean off Cape Hatteras, North Carolina (35°07′N 75°07′W) by U-701 (Kriegsmarine). Her 50 crew abandoned ship and were rescued by USS CG-460 (United States Navy). William Rockefeller was torpedoed and sunk the next day by U-701 at 35°11′N 75°07′W.
Zealand	United Kingdom	World War II: Convoy Metril: The cargo ship was torpedoed and sunk in the Mediterranean Sea 14 nautical miles (26 km) south south west of Haifa (32°27′N 34°43′E) by U-97 (Kriegsmarine) with the loss of fourteen of her 33 crew. Survivors were rescued by HMS Islay (Royal Navy).

== 29 June ==
List of shipwrecks: 29 June 1942
Ship	State	Description
Diana	Regia Marina	World War II: The Diana-class aviso was torpedoed and sunk in the Bomba Bay by HMS Thrasher (Royal Navy) with the loss of 336 of the 455 people on board.
Empire Mica	United Kingdom	World War II: The tanker was torpedoed and sunk in the Gulf of Mexico off Apalachicola, Florida, United States (29°25′N 85°17′W) by U-67 (Kriegsmarine) with the loss of 33 of her 47 crew. Survivors were rescued by the motorboats Countess and Sea Dream (both United States).
Everalda	Latvia	World War II: The cargo ship was shelled and sunk in the Atlantic Ocean 360 nautical miles (670 km) south south west of Bermuda (31°00′N 70°45′W) by U-158 (Kriegsmarine). Her 36 crew survived, two of them were taken aboard U-158 as prisoners of war, and were killed the next day when the U-boat was sunk.
Goviken	Norway	World War II: The cargo ship was torpedoed and sunk in the Indian Ocean (13°15′S 41°35′E) by I-20 (Imperial Japanese Navy). Six survivors were rescued by Eknaren (Sweden), which was torpedoed and sunk on 1 July; they were rescued in turn by Mundra (Sweden), which was torpedoed and sunk on 6 July. A Norwegian whaler and Dundrum Castle (United Kingdom rescued them and landed them in Durban, Union of South Africa. A second group of survivors were rescued by Rodsley (United Kingdom), whilst a third group were rescued by Phemius (United Kingdom). Both groups were landed in Cape Town, Union of South Africa. Thirteen of her 52 crew were lost.
Mona Marie	Canada	World War II: The schooner was destroyed in the Atlantic OCean (12°22′N 60°10′W) by machine gun fire from U-126 (Kriegsmarine). Her eight crew survived.
Rex	United States	The fishing vessel sank in Sitka Sound off Kruzof Island, Alaska Territory.
Ruth	United States	World War II: The cargo ship was torpedoed and sunk in the Atlantic Ocean (21°40′N 59°20′W) by U-153 (Kriegsmarine) with the loss of 34 of her 38 crew. Survivors were rescued by USS Corry (United States Navy).
Thomas McKean	United States	World War II: The Liberty ship was torpedoed and sunk in the Atlantic Ocean 350 nautical miles (650 km) north east of Puerto Rico (approximately 22°N 60°W) by U-505 (Kriegsmarine) with the loss of three of her 57 crew. Twenty-nine survivors sailed in lifeboats to the Virgin Islands, arriving on 4 July. Twelve sailed to Antigua, arriving on 12 July, and thirteen sailed to the Dominican Republic, arriving on 14 July, with one of that group dying of wounds during the ordeal. Her master was killed as a passenger onboard Onondaga (United States) when it was torpedoed and sunk on 23 July.
Waiwera	United Kingdom	World War II: The cargo liner was torpedoed and sunk in the Atlantic Ocean 450 nautical miles (830 km) north of the Azores, Portugal (45°49′N 34°29′W) by U-754 (Kriegsmarine) with the loss of eight of the 105 people aboard. Survivors were rescued by Oregon Express (Norway). Waiwera was on a voyage from Auckland, New Zealand to Liverpool, Lancashire.

== 30 June ==
List of shipwrecks: 30 June 1942
Ship	State	Description
Aircrest	United Kingdom	World War II: The cargo ship was torpedoed and sunk north of Gaza, Egypt (31°50′N 34°39′E) by Luftwaffe aircraft.
City of Birmingham	United States	World War II: The passenger ship was torpedoed and sunk in the Atlantic Ocean. 390 survivors were rescued by the destroyer USS Stansbury (United States Navy).
Express	United States	World War II: The cargo ship was torpedoed and sunk in the Indian Ocean (23°30′S 37°30′E) by I-10 (Imperial Japanese Navy). Two gunners and eleven of her crew were killed when their lifeboat was swamped in heavy seas.
USS Hornbill	United States Navy	The coastal minesweeper collided with the suxiliary schooner Esther Johnson (United States) and sank in San Francisco Bay. Her eleven crew were rescued by Esther Johnson.
HMS Medway	Royal Navy	World War II: The submarine depot ship was torpedoed and sunk in the Mediterranean Sea off Alexandria, Egypt (32°03′N 30°35′E) by U-372 (Kriegsmarine). Thirty of her 1,135 crew were killed.
Mosfruit	Norway	World War II: The cargo ship was torpedoed, shelled, and sunk in the Atlantic Ocean (600 nautical miles (1,100 km) north west of Ireland (56°10′N 23°30′W) by U-458 (Kriegsmarine). All 36 aboard, plus three dogs and a cat survived, although the cat died after three days from the effects of ingesting seawater whilst grooming. Survivors were rescued by Empire Hope (United Kingdom).
Steaua Romana	United Kingdom	World War II: The tanker was shelled, torpedoed and sunk in the Indian Ocean by I-20 (Imperial Japanese Navy).
Tysa	Netherlands	World War II: The cargo ship was torpedoed and damaged in the Atlantic Ocean (54°16′N 26°36′W) by Morosini (Regia Marina). She was scuttled by an escorting warship. Her 43 crew survived.
U-158	Kriegsmarine	World War II: The Type IXC submarine was depth charged and sunk in the Atlantic Ocean west of Bermuda (32°50′N 67°28′W) by a Martin PBM Mariner aircraft of the United States Navy with the loss of all 58 crew and two survivors from Everalda (Latvia).
Unkai Maru No.5	Japan	World War II: The cargo ship was torpedoed and sunk in the East China Sea off Shanghai, China by USS Plunger (United States Navy).
USS YP-128	United States Navy	The patrol boat ran aground in a storm and sank in the Pacific Ocean 3 miles (4.8 km) northeast of Monterey, California.
USS YP-270	United States Navy	The patrol boat ran aground and sank in the Pacific Ocean off Santo Domingo, Baja California, Mexico (25°30′N 112°06′W).

== Unknown date ==
List of shipwrecks: Unknown Date 1942
Ship	State	Description
D-3	Soviet Navy	World War II: The Dekabrist-class submarine (930 GRT) disappeared in patrol between 10 June and early July 1942. Her wreck was discovered in 2021 at the entrance to Kola Bay. She struck a mine and sank with all 53 hands.
George Clymer	United States	World War II: The cargo ship was torpedoed and damaged in the Atlantic Ocean by the motor torpedo boat LS-4 (Kriegsmarine) operating from Michel (Kriegsmarine) on 7 June. A crew member was killed. Survivors reboarded George Clymer after Michel departed the area. They were rescued by RMS Alcantara (United Kingdom). Attempts to scuttle her were unsuccessful and the ship was still afloat when Alcantra had to depart on 12 June. George Clymer sank at an unknown date and location.
M-176	Soviet Navy	World War II: The M-class submarine (205 GRT) disappeared in patrol between 20 June and early July 1942. She probably struck a mine and sank with all 21 hands.
