= German submarine U-126 (1940) =

German World War II submarine

Coordinates: 52°30′N 45°20′W

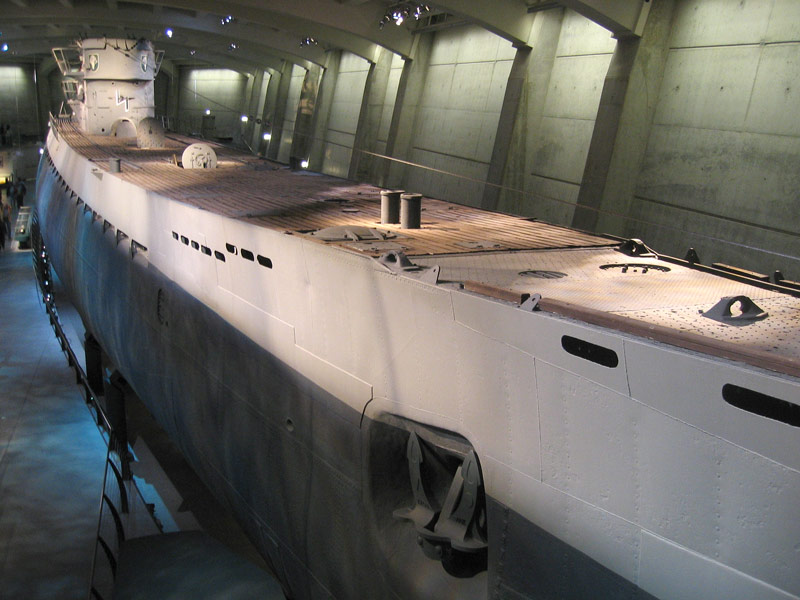
- U-505, a typical Type IXC boat

History

Nazi Germany
- Name: U-126
- Ordered: 7 August 1939
- Builder: DeSchiMAG AG Weser, Bremen
- Yard number: 989
- Laid down: 1 June 1940
- Launched: 31 December 1940
- Commissioned: 22 March 1941
- Fate: Sunk by a British aircraft, 3 July 1943

General characteristics
- Class & type: Type IXC submarine
- Displacement: 1,120 t (1,100 long tons) surfaced; 1,232 t (1,213 long tons) submerged
- Length: 76.76 m (251 ft 10 in) o/a; 58.75 m (192 ft 9 in) pressure hull
- Beam: 6.76 m (22 ft 2 in) overall; 4.40 m (14 ft 5 in) pressure hull
- Height: 9.60 m (31 ft 6 in)
- Draught: 4.70 m (15 ft 5 in)
- Installed power: 4,400 PS (3,200 kW; 4,300 bhp) (diesels); 1,000 PS (740 kW; 990 shp) (electric)
- Propulsion: 2 shafts; 2 × diesel engines; 2 × electric motors
- Speed: 18.3 knots (33.9 km/h; 21.1 mph) surfaced; 7.3 knots (13.5 km/h; 8.4 mph) submerged
- Range: 13,450 nmi (24,910 km; 15,480 mi) at 10 knots (19 km/h; 12 mph) surfaced; 64 nmi (119 km; 74 mi) at 4 knots (7.4 km/h; 4.6 mph) submerged
- Test depth: 230 m (750 ft)
- Complement: 4 officers, 44 enlisted
- Armament: 6 × torpedo tubes (4 bow, 2 stern); 22 × 53.3 cm (21 in) torpedoes; 1 × 10.5 cm (4.1 in) SK C/32 deck gun (180 rounds); 1 × 3.7 cm (1.5 in) SK C/30 AA gun; 1 × twin 2 cm FlaK 30 AA guns

Service record
- Part of: 2nd U-boat Flotilla; 22 March 1941 – 3 July 1943
- Identification codes: M 40 082
- Commanders: Kptlt. Ernst Bauer; 22 March 1941 – 28 February 1943; Oblt.z.S. Siegfried Kietz; 1 March – 3 July 1943
- Operations: 6 patrols: 1st patrol: 5 July – 24 August 1941; 2nd patrol: 24 September – 13 December 1941; 3rd patrol: 2 February – 29 March 1942; 4th patrol: 25 April – 25 July 1942; 5th patrol: 19 September – 7 January 1943; 6th patrol: 20 March – 3 July 1943
- Victories: 24 merchant ships sunk (111,564 GRT); 1 warship sunk (450 tons); 2 merchant ships total loss (14,173 GRT); 5 merchant ships damaged (37,501 GRT)

German submarine U-126 was a Type IXC U-boat of Nazi Germany's Kriegsmarine during World War II. In six patrols, she sank 25 ships for a total of 111,564 gross register tons (GRT) and 450 tons. She was laid down at the DeSchiMAG AG Weser yard in Bremen as yard number 989 on 1 June 1940, launched on 31 December and commissioned on 22 March 1941 under Kapitänleutnant Ernst Bauer.

The submarine commenced her service with the 2nd U-boat Flotilla, an organization she would stay with, both for training and operations.

== Design ==
German Type IXC submarines were slightly larger than the original Type IXBs. U-126 had a displacement of 1,120 tonnes (1,100 long tons) when at the surface and 1,232 tonnes (1,213 long tons) while submerged. The U-boat had a total length of 76.76 m (251 ft 10 in), a pressure hull length of 58.75 m (192 ft 9 in), a beam of 6.76 m (22 ft 2 in), a height of 9.60 m (31 ft 6 in), and a draught of 4.70 m (15 ft 5 in). The submarine was powered by two MAN M 9 V 40/46 supercharged four-stroke, nine-cylinder diesel engines producing a total of 4,400 metric horsepower (3,240 kW; 4,340 shp) for use while surfaced, two Siemens-Schuckert 2 GU 345/34 double-acting electric motors producing a total of 1,000 metric horsepower (740 kW; 990 shp) for use while submerged. She had two shafts and two 1.92 m (6 ft) propellers. The boat was capable of operating at depths of up to 230 metres (750 ft).

The submarine had a maximum surface speed of 18.3 knots (33.9 km/h; 21.1 mph) and a maximum submerged speed of 7.3 knots (13.5 km/h; 8.4 mph). When submerged, the boat could operate for 63 nautical miles (117 km; 72 mi) at 4 knots (7.4 km/h; 4.6 mph); when surfaced, she could travel 13,450 nautical miles (24,910 km; 15,480 mi) at 10 knots (19 km/h; 12 mph). U-126 was fitted with six 53.3 cm (21 in) torpedo tubes (four fitted at the bow and two at the stern), 22 torpedoes, one 10.5 cm (4.13 in) SK C/32 naval gun, 180 rounds, and a 3.7 cm (1.5 in) SK C/30 as well as a 2 cm (0.79 in) C/30 anti-aircraft gun. The boat had a complement of forty-eight.

== Service history ==
=== First patrol ===
U-126 opened her account by damaging the British Canadian Star about 650 nmi (1,200 km; 750 mi) west of Lands End on 20 July 1941. She had missed with torpedoes and decided to use her guns instead, but accurate return fire from the merchantman (many merchant ships had some form of defensive armament fitted), drove her off before she could finish the job. A week later, things improved when she sank Erato on 27 July, west of northwest Spain. She used her deck gun again to sink the schooner Robert Max on 4 August east of the Azores. She sank the Yugoslavian Sud using the deck gun once more, but in conjunction with the Italian submarine Marconi on 14 August northeast of the Azores.

=== Second patrol ===
The boat was rewarded with two sinkings on 10 October 1941 northeast of the Cape Verde islands; Nailsea Manor was carrying HMS LCT-102 as deck cargo when she was attacked. U-126 also sank Lehigh about 82 nmi (152 km; 94 mi) off Freetown, Sierra Leone, on the 19th and Peru on 13 November, southwest of Cape Palmas (Liberia).

She assisted survivors from the German commerce raider Atlantis on the 22nd.

=== Third patrol ===
The boat was also successful in early 1942 as part of Operation Drumbeat (Paukenschlag), the German assault on merchant shipping along the US coast. She sank many vessels, beginning with Gunny on 2 March about 200 nmi (370 km; 230 mi) south of the Bermudas and finished with Olga on the 12th. One ship that did not sink was Colabee. She was attacked on the 13th about 10 nmi (19 km; 12 mi) off Cape Guajaba, Cuba. The ship ran aground after being torpedoed and abandoned with her engines still running. She was salvaged, repaired and returned to service.

=== Fourth patrol ===
There was drama after the sinking of the Norwegian tanker Høegh Giant on 3 June 1942 about 400 nmi (740 km; 460 mi) east of Guyana. The ship's master was questioned by the German sailors, but when he did not understand what was being said, the Germans fired over a lifeboat, wounding one man.

Other vessels were attacked in the area of the Caribbean and the West Indies, using torpedoes and the deck gun.

=== Fifth patrol ===
Patrol number five was the boat's longest – 111 days. The voyage took the submarine to west Africa. On 1 November 1942, she sank the Liberty ship George Thatcher about 100 nmi (190 km; 120 mi) from the coast at Gabon. She was also successful in sinking New Toronto on the fifth 24 nmi (44 km; 28 mi) from Kotonou; her cargo included 75 live cows.

=== Sixth patrol and loss ===
One of U-126's victims on this patrol was Flora MacDonald, which was torpedoed on 30 May 1943 south of Freetown in Sierra Leone. The ship did not sink, but after being beached and the cargo salvaged, she burned for 16 days and was subsequently declared a total loss. The U-boat also hit Standella on 2 June. The submarine was attacked by an aircraft (the source does not give the type), off Freetown on 15 June. The boat was sunk by a Wellington of 127 Squadron RAF, on 3 July 1943, off Cape Ortegal, Spain. There were no survivors from the 55 man crew.

== Summary of raiding history ==
Raiding (Note: Merchant ship tonnages are in gross register tons. Military vessels are listed by tons displacement.)
Date	Name	Nationality	GRT	Fate
20 July 1941	Canadian Star	United Kingdom	8,293	Damaged
27 July 1941	Erato	United Kingdom	1,335	Sunk
27 July 1941	Inga I	Norway	1,304	Sunk
4 August 1941	Robert Max	United Kingdom	172	Sunk
14 August 1941	Sud	Yugoslavia	2,589	Sunk
10 October 1941	HMS LCT-102*	Royal Navy	450	Sunk
10 October 1941	Nailsea Manor	United Kingdom	4,926	Sunk
19 October 1941	Lehigh	United States	4,983	Sunk
20 October 1941	British Mariner	United Kingdom	6,996	Total loss
13 November 1941	Peru	United Kingdom	6,961	Sunk
2 March 1942	Gunny	Norway	2,362	Sunk
5 March 1942	Mariana	United States	3,110	Sunk
7 March 1942	Barbara	United States	4,637	Sunk
7 March 1942	Cardonia	United States	5,104	Sunk
8 March 1942	Esso Bolivar	Panama	10,389	Damaged
9 March 1942	Hanseat	Panama	8,241	Sunk
12 March 1942	Olga	United States	2,496	Sunk
12 March 1942	Texan	United States Navy	7,005	Sunk
13 March 1942	Colabee	United States	5,518	Damaged
3 June 1942	Høegh Giant	Norway	10,990	Sunk
15 June 1942	Dutch Princess	United Kingdom	125	Sunk
16 June 1942	Arkansan	United States	6,997	Sunk
16 June 1942	Kohuku	United States	6,062	Sunk
27 June 1942	Leiv Erikson	Norway	9,952	Sunk
29 June 1942	Mona Marie	Canada	126	Sunk
1 July 1942	Warrior	United States	7,551	Sunk
3 July 1942	Gulfbee	United States	7,104	Damaged
1 November 1942	George Thatcher	United States	7,176	Sunk
4 November 1942	Oued Grou	United Kingdom	792	Sunk
5 May 1943	New Toronto	United Kingdom	6,568	Sunk
30 May 1943	Flora MacDonald	United States	7,177	Total loss
2 June 1943	Standella	United Kingdom	6,197	Damaged

• Being carried aboard Nailsea Manor as deck cargo

== See also ==
- List of successful U-boats
- Black May (1943)

== Bibliography ==
- Busch, Rainer; Röll, Hans-Joachim (1999). German U-boat commanders of World War II : a biographical dictionary. Translated by Brooks, Geoffrey. London, Annapolis, Md: Greenhill Books, Naval Institute Press. ISBN 1-55750-186-6.
- Busch, Rainer; Röll, Hans-Joachim (1999). Deutsche U-Boot-Verluste von September 1939 bis Mai 1945 [German U-boat losses from September 1939 to May 1945]. Der U-Boot-Krieg (in German). Vol. IV. Hamburg, Berlin, Bonn: Mittler. ISBN 3-8132-0514-2.
- Gröner, Erich; Jung, Dieter; Maass, Martin (1991). U-boats and Mine Warfare Vessels. German Warships 1815–1945. Vol. 2. Translated by Thomas, Keith; Magowan, Rachel. London: Conway Maritime Press. ISBN 0-85177-593-4.
- Kemp, Paul (1999). Ships hit by U-Boats Destroyed – German Submarine Losses in the World Wars. London: Arms & Armour. ISBN 1-85409-515-3.
