= USS Edith (ID-3459) =

Cargo ship of the United States Navy

History

United States
- Name: USS Edith
- Namesake: Previous name retained
- Launched: 16 June 1915
- Acquired: 1918
- Commissioned: 1 October 1918
- Decommissioned: 18 May 1919
- Fate: Returned to owner 1919; Sunk 7 June 1942

General characteristics
- Type: Cargo ship
- Displacement: 7,160 long tons (7,275 t)
- Length: 338 ft (103 m)
- Beam: 46 ft 2 in (14.07 m)
- Draft: 21 ft 6 in (6.55 m)
- Speed: 9 knots (17 km/h; 10 mph)
- Armament: 1 × 5 in (130 mm) gun; 1 × 3 in (76 mm) gun

Service record
- Operations: World War I

USS Edith (No. 3459) was a supply ship in the United States Navy.

The U.S. Navy acquired SS Edith from the United States Shipping Board for service during World War I and commissioned her as USS Edith on 1 October 1918.

== Operational history ==
On 1 November 1918, Edith sailed for Nantes, France, with a cargo of ammunition and trucks. Returning to New York City on 12 December 1918, she loaded cargo destined for South America, discharging a portion at Bahia, Brazil, and the remainder at Rio de Janeiro, Brazil. At Santos, Brazil, she took on sugar cane for delivery to New Orleans, Louisiana; however, engine trouble caused her to complete the trip under tow by the U.S. Navy tug USS Potomac.

== Decommissioning ==
Edith was decommissioned on 18 May 1919 and returned to her owner.

== Later career ==
The ship returned to commercial service as SS Edith. During World War II, she was torpedoed and sunk in the Caribbean Sea 200 nautical miles (370 km) southeast of Jamaica (14°33′N 74°35′W) on 7 June 1942 by the German submarine U-159 with the loss of two of her 31 crew members.
