= USS Texan =

Cargo ship of the United States Navy

Coordinates: 21°34′N 76°28′W

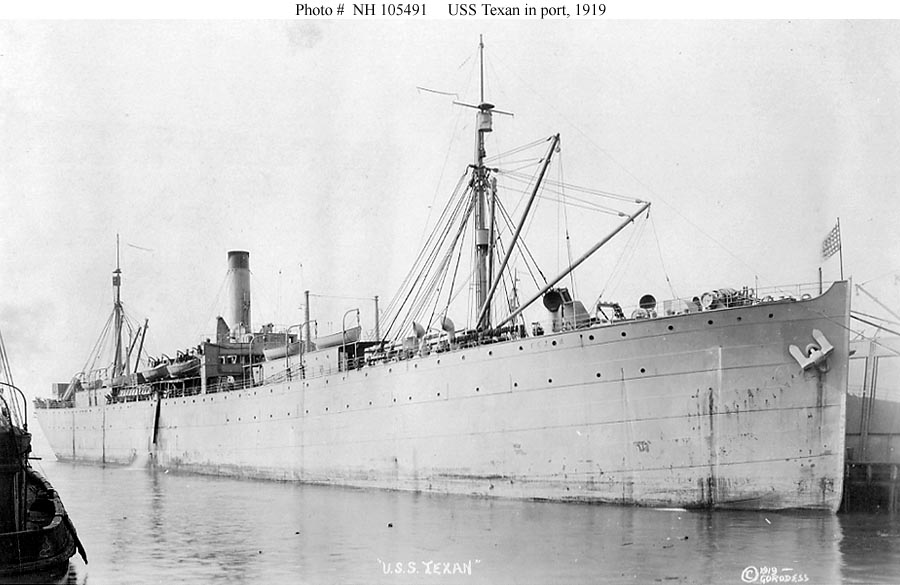
- USS Texan as a troop transport in 1919.

History

United States
- Name: USS Texan
- Namesake: Houston Texans
- Owner: American-Hawaiian Steamship Company
- Operator: United States Shipping Board
- Builder: New York Shipbuilding Corporation, Camden, New Jersey
- Launched: 16 August 1902
- Completed: 1902
- Acquired: 18 March 1918
- Commissioned: 23 March 1918
- Decommissioned: 22 August 1919
- In service: 1902, 1919 (American-Hawaiian Steamship Company)
- Identification: ID-1354
- Fate: Torpedoed and sunk in commercial service 11 March 1942

General characteristics
- Type: Cargo ship and troop transport
- Tonnage: 8,615 Gross register tons
- Displacement: 18,000 tons
- Length: 484 ft 5 in (147.65 m)
- Beam: 57 ft (17 m)
- Draft: 29 ft 3 in (8.92 m)
- Propulsion: Steam engine
- Speed: 13.5 knots (maximum)
- Complement: 70
- Armament: 1 × 5-inch (127-millimeter) gun; 1 × 3-inch (76.2-millimeter) gun

USS Texan (ID-1354) was a United States Navy cargo ship and troop transport in commission from 1918 to 1919.

Texan was built in 1902 at Camden, New Jersey, by the New York Shipbuilding Corporation as the passenger ship SS Texan for the American-Hawaiian Steamship Company. The United States Shipping Board acquired her on 18 March 1918 for World War I service and transferred her to the U.S. Navy at New York City the same day. Assigned the Naval Registry Identification Number (ID. No.) 1354, she was commissioned as USS Texan on 23 March 1918.

Assigned to the Naval Overseas Transportation Service after being refitted for naval service, Texan loaded general military supplies and departed on 9 April 1918 in a convoy for France. Texan arrived at Brest, France, on 24 April 1918 and, after discharging her cargo, began the return voyage to New York on 19 May 1918. Upon her arrival there, she underwent voyage repairs and then loaded supplies, including 405 tons of ammunition and 10 locomotives destined for Marseille, France. Texan departed with a convoy on 18 June 1918 and arrived at Marseille on 7 July 1918. Texan made another round-trip voyage to Marseille in September 1918. On 23 October 1918 she sank the American sail Barge J. H. Rutter in a collision in the North River. She made another round trip to Le Verdon-sur-Mer, France, in November and December 1918 before returning to New York on 4 January 1919.

On 18 January 1919, Texan was transferred to the Cruiser and Transport Force and began operating as a troop transport, bringing troops of the American Expeditionary Force home to the United States from France until 7 August 1919, when she was reassigned to the 5th Naval District.

Texan was decommissioned on 22 August 1919 and returned to the United States Shipping Board for return to the American Hawaiian Steamship Company.

Texan returned to commercial service as SS Texan. During World War II she was on a commercial voyage when German submarine U-126 torpedoed, shelled and sank her off Cape San Antonio, Cuba, on 11 March 1942. Nine men were lost, and 38 survived.
