= German submarine U-153 (1941) =

German World War II submarine

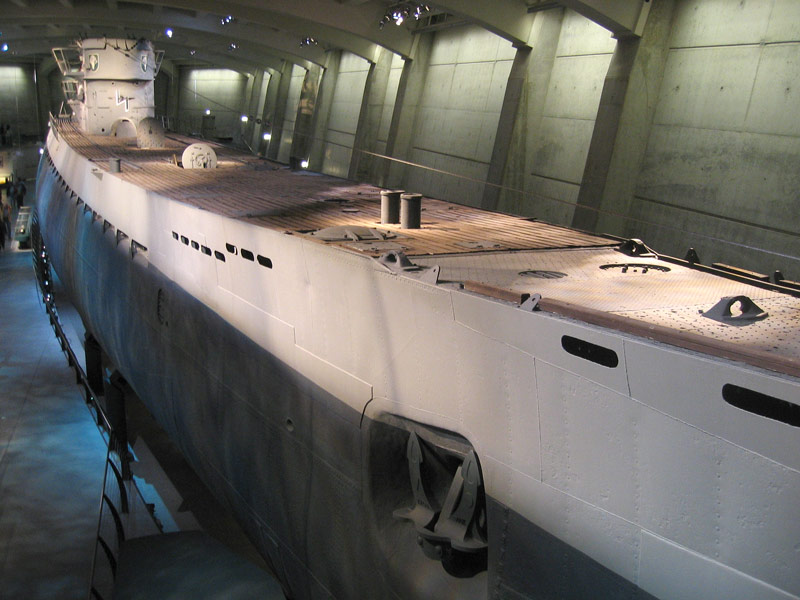
- U-505, a typical Type IXC boat

History

Nazi Germany
- Name: U-153
- Ordered: 25 September 1939
- Builder: DeSchiMAG AG Weser, Bremen
- Yard number: 995
- Laid down: 12 September 1940
- Launched: 5 April 1941
- Commissioned: 19 July 1941
- Fate: Sunk on 13 July 1942

General characteristics
- Class & type: Type IXC submarine
- Displacement: 1,120 t (1,100 long tons) surfaced; 1,232 t (1,213 long tons) submerged
- Length: 76.76 m (251 ft 10 in) o/a; 58.75 m (192 ft 9 in) pressure hull
- Beam: 6.76 m (22 ft 2 in) o/a; 4.40 m (14 ft 5 in) pressure hull
- Height: 9.60 m (31 ft 6 in)
- Draught: 4.70 m (15 ft 5 in)
- Installed power: 4,400 PS (3,200 kW; 4,300 bhp) (diesels); 1,000 PS (740 kW; 990 shp) (electric)
- Propulsion: 2 shafts; 2 × diesel engines; 2 × electric motors
- Speed: 18.3 knots (33.9 km/h; 21.1 mph) surfaced; 7.3 knots (13.5 km/h; 8.4 mph) submerged
- Range: 13,450 nmi (24,910 km; 15,480 mi) at 10 knots (19 km/h; 12 mph) surfaced; 64 nmi (119 km; 74 mi) at 4 knots (7.4 km/h; 4.6 mph) submerged
- Test depth: 230 m (750 ft)
- Complement: 4 officers, 44 enlisted
- Armament: 6 × torpedo tubes (4 bow, 2 stern); 22 × 53.3 cm (21 in) torpedoes; 1 × 10.5 cm (4.1 in) SK C/32 deck gun (180 rounds); 1 × 3.7 cm (1.5 in) SK C/30 AA gun; 1 × twin 2 cm FlaK 30 AA guns

Service record
- Part of: 4th U-boat Flotilla; 19 July 1941 – 31 May 1942; 2nd U-boat Flotilla; 1 June – 13 July 1942
- Identification codes: M 45 783
- Commanders: F.Kapt. Wilfried Reichmann; 19 July 1941 – 13 July 1942
- Operations: 2 patrols: 1st patrol: a. 18 – 20 May 1942; b. 21 – 30 May 1942; 2nd patrol: 6 June – 6 July 1942
- Victories: 3 merchant ships sunk (16,186 GRT)

German submarine U-153 was a Type IXC U-boat of Nazi Germany's Kriegsmarine built for service during World War II. The keel for this boat was laid down on 12 September 1940 at the DeSchiMAG AG Weser yard in Bremen, Germany as yard number 995. She was launched on 5 April 1941 and commissioned on 19 July under the command of Korvettenkapitän Wilfried Reichmann.

The submarine began her service life with training as part of the 4th U-boat Flotilla; moving on to the 2nd flotilla for operations. She conducted two patrols, sinking three ships.

She was sunk by an American destroyer in July 1942.

== Design ==
German Type IXC submarines were slightly larger than the original Type IXBs. U-153 had a displacement of 1,120 tonnes (1,100 long tons) when at the surface and 1,232 tonnes (1,213 long tons) while submerged. The U-boat had a total length of 76.76 m (251 ft 10 in), a pressure hull length of 58.75 m (192 ft 9 in), a beam of 6.76 m (22 ft 2 in), a height of 9.60 m (31 ft 6 in), and a draught of 4.70 m (15 ft 5 in). The submarine was powered by two MAN M 9 V 40/46 supercharged four-stroke, nine-cylinder diesel engines producing a total of 4,400 metric horsepower (3,240 kW; 4,340 shp) for use while surfaced, two Siemens-Schuckert 2 GU 345/34 double-acting electric motors producing a total of 1,000 metric horsepower (740 kW; 990 shp) for use while submerged. She had two shafts and two 1.92 m (6 ft) propellers. The boat was capable of operating at depths of up to 230 metres (750 ft).

The submarine had a maximum surface speed of 18.3 knots (33.9 km/h; 21.1 mph) and a maximum submerged speed of 7.3 knots (13.5 km/h; 8.4 mph). When submerged, the boat could operate for 63 nautical miles (117 km; 72 mi) at 4 knots (7.4 km/h; 4.6 mph); when surfaced, she could travel 13,450 nautical miles (24,910 km; 15,480 mi) at 10 knots (19 km/h; 12 mph). U-153 was fitted with six 53.3 cm (21 in) torpedo tubes (four fitted at the bow and two at the stern), 22 torpedoes, one 10.5 cm (4.13 in) SK C/32 naval gun, 180 rounds, and a 3.7 cm (1.5 in) SK C/30 as well as a 2 cm (0.79 in) C/30 anti-aircraft gun. The boat had a complement of forty-eight.

== Service history ==
On 15 November 1941, U-153 collided with the German Type VIIC submarine U-583 in the Baltic Sea off Danzig (55°23′N 17°05′E). U-153 remained afloat, but U-583 sank with the loss of 45 crew members.

=== First patrol ===
U-153′s first patrol began with her departure from Kiel on 18 May 1942. After a brief stop in Kristiansand in Norway, she headed for the Atlantic Ocean via the gap between the Faroe and Shetland Islands. After a long southwest, south and southeast sweep, she docked at Lorient in occupied France, on the 30th.

=== Second patrol and loss ===
She sank Anglo-Canadian on 25 June 1942 800 nmi (1,500 km; 920 mi) northeast of Antigua. The survivors were helped to lifeboats and received water and cigarettes. The following day, she sank Potlatch, about 650 nmi (1,200 km; 750 mi) east of the Virgin Islands. She also sank Ruth on the 29th about 320 nmi (590 km; 370 mi) north northeast of Barbuda.

U-153 was attacked by US A-20A Havoc aircraft of the United States Army Air Forces 59th Bombardment Squadron (Light) on 6 July 1942 in the eastern Caribbean. She was sunk on 13 July 1942 near Colón, Panama, not far from the entrance to the Panama Canal, by the United States Navy destroyer USS Lansdowne (DD-486).

== Summary of raiding history ==
Date	Name	Nationality	Tonnage (GRT)	Fate
25 June 1942	Anglo-Canadian	United Kingdom	5,268	Sunk
27 June 1942	Potlatch	United States	6,085	Sunk
29 June 1942	Ruth	United States	4,833	Sunk

== Bibliography ==
- Busch, Rainer; Röll, Hans-Joachim (1999). German U-boat commanders of World War II : a biographical dictionary. Translated by Brooks, Geoffrey. London, Annapolis, Md: Greenhill Books, Naval Institute Press. ISBN 1-55750-186-6.
- Busch, Rainer; Röll, Hans-Joachim (1999). Deutsche U-Boot-Verluste von September 1939 bis Mai 1945 [German U-boat losses from September 1939 to May 1945]. Der U-Boot-Krieg (in German). Vol. IV. Hamburg; Berlin; Bonn: Mittler. ISBN 3-8132-0514-2.
- Gröner, Erich; Jung, Dieter; Maass, Martin (1991). U-boats and Mine Warfare Vessels. German Warships 1815–1945. Vol. 2. Translated by Thomas, Keith; Magowan, Rachel. London: Conway Maritime Press. ISBN 0-85177-593-4.
- Kemp, Paul (1999). U-Boats Destroyed - German Submarine Losses in the World Wars. London: Arms & Armour. ISBN 1-85409-515-3.
