= SS Argo (1898 Napier) =

History
- Name: (United Kingdom) Camperdown (1898-1912); (Sweden) Elisabeth (1912-1919); (Sweden) Odessa (1919-1924); (Finland) Argo (1924-1942)
- Owner: Rederi A/B Ponape
- Builder: Napier R. & Sons
- Yard number: 464
- Launched: 7 June 1898
- Completed: 1898
- Acquired: 1898
- Maiden voyage: 1898
- In service: 1898
- Identification: OFCD; Official number: 891
- Fate: Torpedoed and sunk 16 June 1942

General characteristics
- Type: Cargo ship
- Tonnage: 2,513 GRT
- Length: 98.5 metres (323 ft 2 in)
- Beam: 13.47 metres (44 ft 2 in)
- Depth: 6.22 metres (20 ft 5 in)
- Installed power: 1 x 3 cyl. triple expansion engine
- Propulsion: Screw propeller
- Speed: 8.5 knots
- Crew: 23

SS Argo was a Finnish Cargo ship that the Soviet submarine Shch-317 torpedoed on 16 June 1942 in the Gulf of Finland between Bogskär and Utö, Finland.

== Construction ==
Argo was built at the Napier R. & Sons shipyard in Glasgow, Scotland, United Kingdom in 1898. Where she was launched and completed that same year. The ship was 98.5 metres (323 ft 2 in) long, had a beam of 13.47 metres (44 ft 2 in) and had a depth of 6.22 metres (20 ft 5 in). She was assessed at 2,513 GRT and had 1 x 3 cyl. triple expansion engine driving a screw propeller. The ship could reach a maximum speed of 8.5 knots and could generate 832 n.h.p.

== Sinking ==
Argo was torpedoed and sunk by the Soviet submarine Shch-317 torpedoed on 16 June 1942 in the Gulf of Finland between Bogskär and Utö, Finland. The sinking claimed the lives of 9 of her crew and the 14 survivors were rescued by the Swedish merchant ship Ulla, who herself was nearly torpedoed by the same Soviet submarine.

== Wreck ==
The wreck of Argo lies at (59°21′N 20°14′E).
