= Resolute (schooner) =

History
- Name: (Colombia) Resolute
- Fate: Shelled and sunk 23 June 1942

General characteristics
- Type: Sailing ship
- Tonnage: 35 GRT
- Crew: 10

SV Resolute was a Colombian schooner that the German submarine U-172 shelled and sank on 23 June 1942 in the Caribbean Sea.

== Construction ==
Resolute was built as a schooner at an unknown date. Her size and speed are also unknown. She was assessed at 35 gross register tons (GRT).

== Sinking ==
Resolute was stopped by the German submarine U-172 at 17:10 pm on 23 June 1942 in the Caribbean Sea near Saint Andrews and Old Providence. Afterwards the U-boat sank the abandoned vessel with hand grenades and gunfire from her deck gun. The attack and sinking of Resolute claimed the lives six of her ten crew members; the four survivors later claimed that they were machine gunned after having abandoned the ship, but this was apparently a misinterpretation of shots that missed Resolute.

== Wreck ==
The wreck of Resolute lies at 13°15′N 80°30′W.
