= German submarine U-159 (1941) =

German World War II submarine

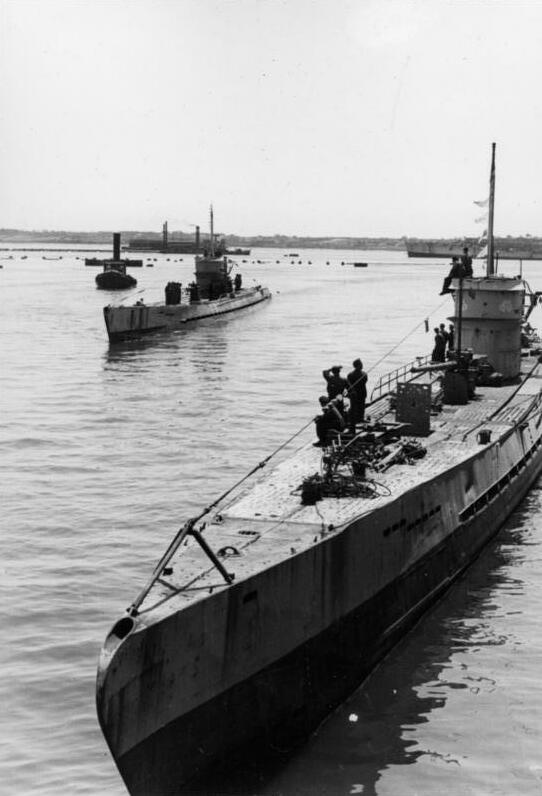
- U-159 (left) returning to Lorient, U-107 (right), 12 July 1942

History

Nazi Germany
- Name: U-159
- Ordered: 23 December 1939
- Builder: DeSchiMAG AG Weser, Bremen
- Yard number: 1009
- Laid down: 11 November 1940
- Launched: 1 July 1941
- Commissioned: 4 October 1941
- Fate: Sunk on 28 July 1943

General characteristics
- Class & type: Type IXC submarine
- Displacement: 1,120 t (1,100 long tons) surfaced; 1,232 t (1,213 long tons) submerged
- Length: 76.76 m (251 ft 10 in) o/a; 58.75 m (192 ft 9 in) pressure hull
- Beam: 6.76 m (22 ft 2 in) o/a; 4.40 m (14 ft 5 in) pressure hull
- Height: 9.60 m (31 ft 6 in)
- Draught: 4.70 m (15 ft 5 in)
- Installed power: 4,400 PS (3,200 kW; 4,300 bhp) (diesels); 1,000 PS (740 kW; 990 shp) (electric)
- Propulsion: 2 shafts; 2 × diesel engines; 2 × electric motors
- Speed: 18.3 knots (33.9 km/h; 21.1 mph) surfaced; 7.3 knots (13.5 km/h; 8.4 mph) submerged
- Range: 13,450 nmi (24,910 km; 15,480 mi) at 10 knots (19 km/h; 12 mph) surfaced; 64 nmi (119 km; 74 mi) at 4 knots (7.4 km/h; 4.6 mph) submerged
- Test depth: 230 m (750 ft)
- Complement: 4 officers, 44 enlisted
- Armament: 6 × torpedo tubes (4 bow, 2 stern); 22 × 53.3 cm (21 in) torpedoes; 1 × 10.5 cm (4.1 in) SK C/32 deck gun (180 rounds); 1 × 3.7 cm (1.5 in) SK C/30 AA gun; 1 × 2 cm FlaK 30 AA guns

Service record
- Part of: 4th U-boat Flotilla; 4 October 1941 – 30 April 1942; 10th U-boat Flotilla; 1 May 1942 – 28 July 1943
- Identification codes: M 19 192
- Commanders: Kptlt. Helmut Witte; 4 October 1941 – 6 June 1943; Oblt.z.S. d.R. Heinz Beckmann; 7 June – 28 July 1943
- Operations: 5 patrols: 1st patrol: 22 April – 3 May 1942; 2nd patrol: 14 May – 13 July 1942; 3rd patrol: 24 August 1942 – 5 January 1943; 4th patrol: 4 March – 25 April 1943; 5th patrol: 12 June – 28 July 1943
- Victories: 23 merchant ships sunk (119,554 GRT); 1 merchant ship damaged (265 GRT)

German submarine U-159 was a Type IXC U-boat of Nazi Germany's Kriegsmarine built for service during World War II. The keel for this boat was laid down on 11 November 1940 at the DeSchiMAG AG Weser yard in Bremen, Germany as yard number 1009. She was launched on 1 July 1941 and commissioned on 4 October under the command of Kapitänleutnant Helmut Witte (Knight's Cross).

The U-boat's service began with training as part of the 4th U-boat Flotilla. She then moved to the 10th flotilla on 1 May 1942 for operations. She sank 23 ships, totalling 119,554 gross register tons (GRT) and damaged one more of 265 GRT.

She was sunk by an American aircraft on 28 July 1943.

== Design ==
German Type IXC submarines were slightly larger than the original Type IXBs. U-159 had a displacement of 1,120 tonnes (1,100 long tons) when at the surface and 1,232 tonnes (1,213 long tons) while submerged. The U-boat had a total length of 76.76 m (251 ft 10 in), a pressure hull length of 58.75 m (192 ft 9 in), a beam of 6.76 m (22 ft 2 in), a height of 9.60 m (31 ft 6 in), and a draught of 4.70 m (15 ft 5 in). The submarine was powered by two MAN M 9 V 40/46 supercharged four-stroke, nine-cylinder diesel engines producing a total of 4,400 metric horsepower (3,240 kW; 4,340 shp) for use while surfaced, two Siemens-Schuckert 2 GU 345/34 double-acting electric motors producing a total of 1,000 metric horsepower (740 kW; 990 shp) for use while submerged. She had two shafts and two 1.92 m (6 ft) propellers. The boat was capable of operating at depths of up to 230 metres (750 ft).

The submarine had a maximum surface speed of 18.3 knots (33.9 km/h; 21.1 mph) and a maximum submerged speed of 7.3 knots (13.5 km/h; 8.4 mph). When submerged, the boat could operate for 63 nautical miles (117 km; 72 mi) at 4 knots (7.4 km/h; 4.6 mph); when surfaced, she could travel 13,450 nautical miles (24,910 km; 15,480 mi) at 10 knots (19 km/h; 12 mph). U-159 was fitted with six 53.3 cm (21 in) torpedo tubes (four fitted at the bow and two at the stern), 22 torpedoes, one 10.5 cm (4.13 in) SK C/32 naval gun, 180 rounds, and a 3.7 cm (1.5 in) SK C/30 as well as a 2 cm (0.79 in) C/30 anti-aircraft gun. The boat had a complement of forty-eight.

== Service history ==
=== First and second patrols ===
The submarine's first patrol took her from Kiel on 22 April 1942, across the North Sea and into the Atlantic Ocean through the gap between the Faroe and Shetland Islands. She arrived at Lorient, in occupied France, on 3 May. She would be based at this Atlantic port for the rest of her career.

U-159's second sortie proved to be successful, sinking ships such as Montenol on 21 May 1942 140 nmi (260 km; 160 mi) east southeast of Santa Maria, in the Azores. She also attacked Illinois, which with a cargo of 8,000 tons of manganese ore, sank in 40 seconds. The U-boat's deck gun got plenty of use, sinking Sally on 5 June and Flora on the 18th. On another occasion, due to rough seas, the weapon could not be used in the attack on the Brazilian sailing ship Paracury; her 20mm AA gun was used instead. Holes at the waterline were shot into the vessel, which capsized but did not sink. The wreck was subsequently recovered and repaired. The boat was attacked by a Leigh Light-equipped Vickers Wellington aircraft of No. 172 Squadron RAF on 13 July 1942. She was severely damaged and barely managed to reach Lorient, some 12 hours later.

=== Third patrol ===
Her third foray was to the South Atlantic and at 135 days, her longest and most destructive. Attacking and sinking among others, Boringia, the Empire Nomad and Ross. The boat was attacked by an SAAF [South African Air Force] Lockheed Ventura on 10 October 1942; only minor damage was sustained. She also torpedoed and sank La Salle on 7 November 1942. When the ships' cargo of ammunition exploded, it was heard at the Cape Point lighthouse, more than 300 nmi (560 km; 350 mi) away. Another of her victims, Star of Scotland, (which despite the name was registered in the US), was a steel sailing ship which was attacked and sunk with the deck gun about 900 nmi (1,700 km; 1,000 mi) west of Luderitz Bay, South Africa. Her master was to be taken away as a prisoner, but he was returned to his men after he pointed out to the submariners that he was the only man who could navigate.

Another "Star", Star of Suez, was sunk. Amongst the floating debris were 45 aircraft tyres, a 20 hp electric motor and 120 grapefruits; they were recovered by U-159. Another U-boat, U-134, which had been thwarted in her attempt to get into an attacking position in time, also managed to rescue some aircraft tyres and spare parts for cars.

=== Fourth patrol ===
On her fourth patrol, U-159 sank Silverbeech on 28 March 1943 south of the Canary Islands from convoy RS 3. The U-boat was attacked by aircraft (she was one of eight), off the coast of Spanish, (now Western) Sahara.

=== Fifth patrol and loss ===
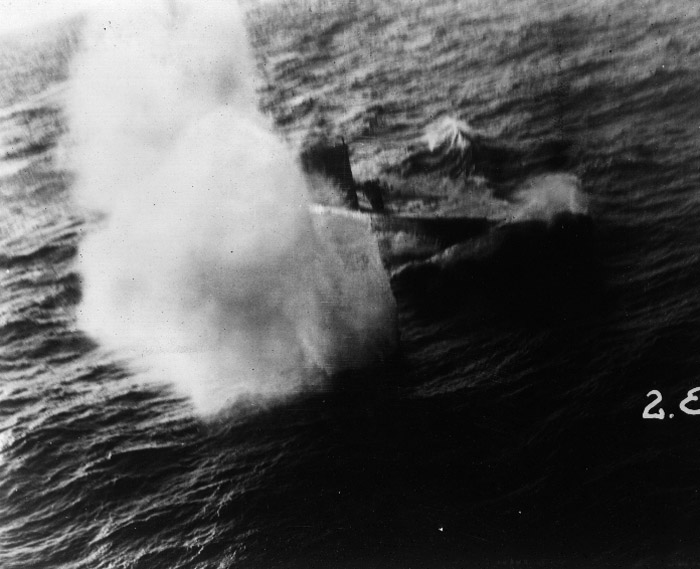
U-159 attacked and sunk by a PBM-3C of VP-32 on 28 July 1943.

Her final patrol saw U-159 depart Lorient on 12 June 1943. She was sunk by a US Navy Mariner aircraft of VP-32.

=== Wolfpacks ===
U-159 took part in two wolfpacks, namely:

- Wohlgemut (12 – 22 March 1943)
- Seeräuber (25 – 30 March 1943)

== Summary of raiding history ==
Date	Name	Nationality	Tonnage (GRT)	Fate
21 May 1942	Montenol	United Kingdom	2,646	Sunk
21 May 1942	New Brunswick	United Kingdom	6,529	Sunk
2 June 1942	Illinois	United States	5,447	Sunk
5 June 1942	Paracury	Brazil	265	Damaged
5 June 1942	Sally	Honduras	150	Sunk
7 June 1942	Edith	United States	3,382	Sunk
11 June 1942	Fort Good Hope	United Kingdom	7,130	Sunk
13 June 1942	Sixaola	United States	4,693	Sunk
13 June 1942	Solon Turman	United States	6,762	Sunk
18 June 1942	Flora	Netherlands	1,417	Sunk
19 June 1942	Ante Matkovic	Yugoslavia	2,710	Sunk
22 June 1942	E.J. Sadler	United States	9,639	Sunk
7 October 1942	Boringia	United Kingdom	5,821	Sunk
8 October 1942	Clan Mactavish	United Kingdom	7,631	Sunk
9 October 1942	Coloradan	United States	6,557	Sunk
13 October 1942	Empire Nomad	United Kingdom	7,167	Sunk
29 October 1942	Laplace	United Kingdom	7,327	Sunk
29 October 1942	Ross	United Kingdom	4,978	Sunk
7 November 1942	La Salle	United States	5,462	Sunk
13 November 1942	Star of Scotland	United States	2,290	Sunk
13 November 1942	City of Bombay	United Kingdom	7,140	Sunk
15 December 1942	Star of Suez	Egypt	4,999	Sunk
16 December 1942	East Wales	United Kingdom	4,358	Sunk
28 March 1943	Silverbeech	United Kingdom	5,319	Sunk

== Bibliography ==
- Busch, Rainer; Röll, Hans-Joachim (1999). German U-boat commanders of World War II : a biographical dictionary. Translated by Brooks, Geoffrey. London, Annapolis, Md: Greenhill Books, Naval Institute Press. ISBN 1-55750-186-6.
- Busch, Rainer; Röll, Hans-Joachim (1999). Deutsche U-Boot-Verluste von September 1939 bis Mai 1945 [German U-boat losses from September 1939 to May 1945]. Der U-Boot-Krieg (in German). Vol. IV. Hamburg, Berlin, Bonn: Mittler. ISBN 3-8132-0514-2.
- Gröner, Erich; Jung, Dieter; Maass, Martin (1991). U-boats and Mine Warfare Vessels. German Warships 1815–1945. Vol. 2. Translated by Thomas, Keith; Magowan, Rachel. London: Conway Maritime Press. ISBN 0-85177-593-4.
- Kemp, Paul (1999). Ships hit by U-Boats Destroyed - German Submarine Losses in the World Wars. London: Arms & Armour. ISBN 1-85409-515-3.
