= Soviet destroyer Bezuprechny =

Bezuprechny is the name of the following ships in the Soviet Navy:

- Soviet destroyer Bezuprechny (1937), a Gnevny-class destroyer, sunk by aircraft in 1942 during WWII
- Soviet destroyer Bezuprechny (1983), a Sovremenny-class destroyer decommissioned in 1994
