= Soviet submarine Shch-317 =

- Shch-317 was of X series.

History

Soviet Union
- Name: Shch-317
- Laid down: 23 July 1934
- Launched: 24 September 1935
- Commissioned: 29 September 1936
- Out of service: 14 July 1942
- Fate: Sunk by Finnish minelayer Ruotsinsalmi

General characteristics
- Class & type: Shchuka-class submarine, Type X
- Displacement: 577 tons surfaced; 704 tons submerged
- Length: 57.00 m (187 ft 0 in)
- Beam: 6.20 m (20 ft 4 in)
- Draught: 3.78 m (12 ft 5 in)
- Propulsion: 2 shaft diesel electric, 1,020 kW (1,370 bhp) diesel, 600 kW (800 bhp) electric
- Speed: 12.5 knots (23.2 km/h; 14.4 mph) on the surface; 6.3 knots (11.7 km/h; 7.2 mph) submerged
- Range: 6,000 nautical miles (11,000 km; 6,900 mi) at 8 knots (15 km/h; 9.2 mph)
- Test depth: 91 m (300 ft)
- Complement: 38
- Armament: 4 × bow torpedo tubes; 2 × stern torpedo tubes; (10 torpedoes); 2 × 45 mm (1.8 in) semi-automatic guns

Shch-317 was a Shchuka-class submarine of the Soviet Navy. Her keel was laid down by A. Marti in Leningrad on 23 July 1934. She was launched on 24 September 1935 and commissioned on 29 September 1936 in the Baltic Fleet.

== Service history ==
During the 1942 campaign, the submarine was under the command of Captain Mokhov Nikolay Konstantinovich and took part in the Soviet submarine campaign on 1942 in Baltic Sea. Shch-317 scored victories, all of them in the summer 1942. The submarine torpedoed and damaged the Danish merchant Orion (2,405 GRT) on 19 June 1942, but did not sink the cargo vessel. She scored most of her success against the German-Swedish iron ore shipping lines, which was the main target of 1942 Soviet submarine campaign.

=== Loss ===
While returning home after the successful campaign of summer 1942, Shch-317 was sunk. On the last mission, the submarine division commander Captain 2nd Rank V.A. Yegorov was also on board. The most likely cause of the sinking was that she struck a naval mine in the Seeigel minefield on 18 July 1942.

Ships sunk by Shch-317.
Date	Ship	Flag	Tonnage	Notes
16 June 1942	Argo	(Finland)	2,513 GRT	freighter(torpedo)
22 June 1942	Ada Gorthon	(Sweden)	2,399 GRT	freighter (torpedo)
8 July 1942	Otto Cords	(Nazi Germany)	966 GRT	freighter (torpedo)
Total:			5,878 GRT	

=== Wreck discovery ===
UMEX (Underwater Exploration Team) divers located the wreck of Shch-317 on 2 May 2018 at a depth of 255 ft. (78 meters) in the eastern part of the Gulf of Finland near Gogland.
