= USS Hornbill (AMc-13) =

Minesweeper of the United States Navy

History

United States
- Name: USS Hornbill
- Builder: Martinolich Repair Basin, Tacoma, Washington
- Launched: 1938, as J. A. Martinolich
- Commissioned: 7 December 1940
- Stricken: 24 July 1942
- Fate: Sank after collision, 30 June 1942

General characteristics
- Type: Coastal minesweeper
- Displacement: 195 long tons (198 t)
- Length: 83 ft 2 in (25.35 m)
- Beam: 20 ft 1 in (6.12 m)
- Draft: 5 ft (1.5 m)
- Depth of hold: 10 ft (3.0 m)
- Speed: 10 knots (19 km/h; 12 mph)
- Complement: 11
- Armament: 1 × .30 cal (7.62 mm) machine gun

USS Hornbill (AMc-13) was a coastal minesweeper of the United States Navy, named after the hornbill.

The ship was launched as the fishing boat J. A. Martinolich in 1938 by the Martinolich Repair Basin, Tacoma, Washington. She was taken over by the Navy, and commissioned on 7 December 1940.

== West Coast assignment ==
Hornbill was assigned to the mine force in the 12th Naval District. She engaged in coastal sweeping of the main ship channel for magnetic and acoustic type mines. After the attack on Pearl Harbor, her service became more valuable with the Japanese threat to U.S. West Coast sea traffic.

== Collision and sinking ==
On the morning of 30 June 1942 Esther Johnson, a 208 ft 4 in (63.50 m), 1,104 GRT steam lumber schooner on passage from Coos Bay, Oregon, collided with Hornbill in San Francisco Bay. Approximately thirty minutes after the collision the minesweeper sank. The crew was saved and a small amount of equipment was safely removed to the lumber schooner. She was stricken from the Naval Vessel Register on 24 July 1942.
