= List of shipwrecks in June 1943 =

The list of shipwrecks in June 1943 includes ships sunk, foundered, grounded, or otherwise lost during June 1943.

== 1 June ==
List of shipwrecks: 1 June 1943
Ship	State	Description
Birka	Germany	World War II: The hospital ship struck a mine laid by L-22 (Soviet Navy) and sank off Northern Norway (70°25′N 21°40′E) with the loss of 115 lives.
DB-50	Soviet Navy	World War II: The No. 1-class landing boat was sunk by German fighters off Gelendzhik, Russia.
John Morgan	United States	The Liberty ship collided with Montana (United States) in the Atlantic Ocean off Cape Henry, Virginia (36°53′N 76°00′W). She caught fire, exploded and sank. 25 Armed Guard gunners and all 42 crew were lost, only 13 gunners survived. 9 other sailors and 10 gunners died aboard the Montana.
KL-12	Soviet Navy	The auxiliary river gunboat (173 GRT) of the Onega military flotilla was sunk by enemy aircraft off Vasilisin Island with the loss of 27 lives. The 22 survivors were rescued by the gunboat L-41 (Soviet Navy).
Mischief	United States	The 9-gross register ton, 34.8-foot (10.6 m) fishing vessel was destroyed by fire at Ketchikan, Territory of Alaska.
Noborikawa Maru	Japan	World War II: The cargo ship was torpedoed and sunk in Sagami Bay by USS Trigger (United States Navy).
Salabangka	Netherlands	World War II: Convoy CD 20: The cargo ship (6,586 GRT, 1920) was torpedoed and sunk in the Indian Ocean (31°08′S 30°18′E) by U-178 (Kriegsmarine) with the loss of ten of her 85 crew. Survivors were rescued by HMS Masterful (Royal Navy).
Shch-406	Soviet Navy	World War II. The submarine was bombed and sunk at Steinskär by Arado Ar 196 aircraft of the Luftwaffe.

== 2 June ==
List of shipwrecks: 2 June 1943
Ship	State	Description
Castore	Regia Marina	World War II: The Spica-class torpedo boat (640 GRT) was shelled and sunk in the Mediterranean Sea off Cape Spartivento (37°55′N 16°04′E) by the Allied destroyers HMS Jervis (Royal Navy) and Vasilissa Olga (Hellenic Navy). 82 or 85 crewmen were killed, there were around 70 survivors.
Eika Maru	Japan	World War II: The cargo ship was torpedoed and sunk in the Pacific Ocean off Macau by USS Tambor (United States Navy).
U-105	Kriegsmarine	World War II: The Type IXB submarine (1,430 GRT) was depth charged and sunk in the Atlantic Ocean off Dakar, French West Africa (14°15′N 17°35′W) by the Free French Air Force Potez-CAMS 141 aircraft Antarès with the loss of all 53 crew.
U-202	Kriegsmarine	World War II: The Type VIIC submarine (1,070 GRT) was shelled, depth charged and sunk in the Atlantic Ocean south of Greenland (56°12′N 39°52′W) by HMS Starling (Royal Navy) with the loss of 18 of her 48 crew.
U-521	Kriegsmarine	World War II: The Type IXC submarine (1,540 GRT) was depth charged and sunk in the Atlantic Ocean (37°43′N 73°16′W) by USS PC-565 (United States Navy) with the loss of 51 of her 52 crew.

== 3 June ==
List of shipwrecks: 3 June 1943
Ship	State	Description
Boris	Greece	World War II: The cargo ship (5,166 GRT, 1917) was torpedoed and sunk in the Atlantic Ocean off Ascension Island (7°14′S 18°41′W) by U-180 (Kriegsmarine). All 37 crew survived.
Halma	Panama	World War II: Convoy BX 55: The cargo ship straggled behind the convoy. She struck a mine and sank in the Atlantic Ocean off Halifax, Nova Scotia, Canada (44°17′N 62°23′W). All 48 people aboard were rescued by the sailing vessel Caroline Rose ( Canada).
Henri Desprez	Germany	World War II: The tanker was torpedoed in the Mediterranean Sea (39°13′N 16°01′E) by HMS Unruffled (Royal Navy). Henri Desprez sank the next day.
Montanan	United States	World War II: The cargo ship was torpedoed and sunk by I-27 (Imperial Japanese Navy) 150 nautical miles (280 km) South of Masirah Island, Oman in the Arabian Sea (17°54′N 58°09′E). Six crew members and two Armed Guard members died. One lifeboat rescued by an Arab dhow, the other sailed to Masirah Island.

== 4 June ==
List of shipwrecks: 4 June 1943
Ship	State	Description
USS PC-496	United States Navy	World War II: The PC-461-class submarine chaser (284 GRT) was mined and sank in the Mediterranean Sea off Bizerte, Tunisia (37°23′N 09°52′E). Five crewmen were killed. The 65 survivors were rescued by SC 638 and 639 (United States Navy).
U-308	Kriegsmarine	World War II: The Type VIIC submarine was torpedoed and sunk in the Norwegian Sea north east of the Faroe Islands (64°28′N 3°09′W) by HMS Truculent (Royal Navy) with the loss of all 44 crew.
U-594	Kriegsmarine	World War II: The Type VIIC submarine was sunk in the Atlantic Ocean west of Gibraltar (35°55′N 9°25′W) in a rocket attack by a Lockheed Hudson aircraft of 48 Squadron, Royal Air Force with the loss of all 50 crew.

== 5 June ==
List of shipwrecks: 5 June 1943
Ship	State	Description
Altenfels	Germany	World War II: The cargo ship was torpedoed and sunk south of Bergen, Norway, by HNoMS MTB-620 and HNoMS MTB-626 (both Royal Norwegian Navy), killing 22 civilian crewmen and 14 Kriegsmarine sailors.
Dumra	United Kingdom	World War II: The cargo ship (2,304 GRT, 1922) was torpedoed and sunk in the Indian Ocean north east of Durban, South Africa (28°15′S 33°20′E) by U-198 (Kriegsmarine) with the loss of 26 of her 93 crew. One survivor was taken aboard U-198 as a prisoner of war.
H8	Regia Marina	World War II: The Holland 602 type submarine was bombed and sunk at La Spezia by Royal Air Force aircraft. Raised and scrapped. There were no casualties.
Reigh Count	Panama	The cargo ship collided with Chagres (Panama) off Halifax, Nova Scotia, Canada and sank (44°08′N 63°13′W). Her 28 crew survived.
Shintoku Maru	Imperial Japanese Army	World War II: The Shintoku Maru-class auxiliary transport ship was sunk south west of Buin in the Bougainville Strait (07°00′S 155°35′E) by American carrier-based aircraft.
U-217	Kriegsmarine	World War II: The Type VIID submarine was depth charged and sunk in the Atlantic Ocean (30°18′N 42°50′W) by Grumman TBF Avenger aircraft based on USS Bogue (United States Navy) with the loss of all 50 crew.

== 6 June ==
List of shipwrecks: 6 June 1943
Ship	State	Description
Conegliano	Italy	World War II: The ship was sunk by aircraft off Olbia, Sardinia with some loss of life. She was refloated on 5 March 1949 but sank again.
Dunarea-1	Romania	World War II: The lighter was sunk by a mine in the Black Sea.
Erg	Canada	The tug was run down by Norelg (Norway) in Halifax Harbour. The three crew members and 16 of the 21 shipyard workers on board died in the accident.
Heinrich von Plauen	Germany	World War II: The transport was torpedoed and sunk in the Baltic Sea off Domesnes, Latvia by Soviet Ilyushin Il-4 aircraft. Three crew were killed.
Kaliope S	Romania	World War II: The lighter was sunk by a mine in the Black Sea. Later raised.
MO-039	Soviet Navy	World War II: The MO-4-class patrol vessel was sunk by German fighters of JG 52 off Anapa, Russia.
Nagashige Maru No. 2	Japan	World War II: The sailing vessel was sunk in the Pacific Ocean off the Aleutian Islands, Alaska, United States by USS S-30 (United States Navy).
HMS Sargasso	Royal Navy	World War II: The armed yacht (223 GRT, 1926) was sunk by a mine off the Isle of Wight. Two crew were killed.
Shinei Maru	Japan	World War II: The cargo ship was torpedoed and sunk in the Basalin Strait by USS Tautog (United States Navy).
TKA-46	Soviet Navy	The G-5-class motor torpedo boat was sunk by German fighters of JG 52 off Anapa, Russia.
TKA-66	Soviet Navy	The G-5-class motor torpedo boat was sunk by German fighters of JG 52 off Anapa, Russia.
William King	United States	World War II: The Liberty ship was torpedoed and sunk in the Indian Ocean off South Africa (30°25′S 34°15′E) by U-198 (Kriegsmarine) with the loss of six of her 65 crew. The captain was taken aboard U-198 as a prisoner of war. The rest of the survivors were rescued by HMT Northern Chief and HMS Relentless (both Royal Navy).

== 7 June ==
List of shipwrecks: 7 June 1943
Ship	State	Description
Gaspar de Portola	United States	The Liberty ship ran aground on the Quita Sueño Reef, Colombia. She was refloated but declared a constructive total loss.
Harrier	South Africa	World War II: The coaster (193 GRT, 1892) was torpedoed and sunk in the Indian Ocean (25°50′S 33°20′E) by U-181 (Kriegsmarine) with the loss of all 16 crew.
MO-102	Soviet Navy	World War II: The MO-4-class patrol vessel was sunk by a mine off Lavensaari in the Gulf of Finland.
MO-123	Soviet Navy	The MO-4-class patrol vessel was heavily damaged by a mine off Lavensaari in the Gulf of Finland. She was not repaired.

== 8 June ==
List of shipwrecks: 8 June 1943
Ship	State	Description
Mutsu	Imperial Japanese Navy	The Nagato-class battleship was sunk in the Pacific Ocean near Hashirajima by an internal explosion that killed 1,121 of the 1,474 people on board.
HA-32 and two unknown midget submarines	Imperial Japanese Navy	World War II: Evacuation of Kiska: The last three midget submarines (46 t, 1941) were scuttled at Kiska, Aleutians as the Japanese preparated to evacuate the island. Three wrecks of midget submarines were also blown up the same day.
Kahoku Maru	Imperial Japanese Navy	World War II: Convoy P-607: The Kanan Maru-class auxiliary transport ship was torpedoed and sunk in the Pacific Ocean 119 nautical miles (220 km; 137 mi) north of Koror, Palau (09°30′N 134°32′E) by USS Finback (United States Navy). One crewman was killed. Survivors were rescued by PB-31 (Imperial Japanese Navy).

== 10 June ==
List of shipwrecks: 10 June 1943
Ship	State	Description
Birka	Germany	World War II: The auxiliary ship struck a mine and sank in Trondheimsfjord off Trondheim, Norway with the loss of about 400 of the about 800 people aboard.
Esso Gettysburg	United States	World War II: The tanker was torpedoed and sunk in the Atlantic Ocean (31°02′N 79°17′W) by U-66 (Kriegsmarine) with the loss of 57 of her 72 crew. Survivors were rescued by USAT George Washington (United States Army).
Iro	Imperial Japanese Navy	World War II: The fleet oiler was torpedoed and sunk in the Pacific Ocean off the coast of Japan by USS Tinosa (United States Navy).
KT 12	Kriegsmarine	World War II: The transport ship was torpedoed and sunk in the Mediterranean Sea by HMS Safari (Royal Navy). 39 of her crewmen were saved but 27 were lost.

== 11 June ==
List of shipwrecks: 11 June 1943
Ship	State	Description
I-24	Imperial Japanese Navy	World War II: The Type C submarine was depth charged, rammed and sunk in the Pacific Ocean 40 nautical miles (74 km) north-north-east of Shemya, Alaska by USS PC-487 (United States Navy) with the loss of all 104 crew.
Genoa Maru	Imperial Japanese Army	World War II: Convoy O-204: The Genoa Maru-class auxiliary transport was torpedoed and sunk in the Pacific Ocean west of Babelthuap Island, Palau, northwest of Palau road entrance (07°35′N 134°28′E) by USS Finback (United States Navy). One passenger was killed.
Hide Maru	Imperial Japanese Navy	World War II: The Hide Maru-class auxiliary transport ship (a.k.a. Hinode Maru) was torpedoed and sunk in the Steffan Strait by USS Silversides (United States Navy). One crewman was killed.
Jinbu Maru	Japan	World War II: Convoy No. 2082:The cargo ship was torpedoed and sunk in the Pacific Ocean off the Aleutian Islands, Alaska, United States by USS S-30 (United States Navy).
MAS 539	Regia Marina	World War II: The MAS 526-class MAS boat was sunk at Lampedusa by US aircraft.
MAS 564	Regia Marina	World War II: The MAS 552-class MAS boat was sunk at Lampedusa by American aircraft.
Perseverance	United States	The 16-gross register ton 39-foot (11.9 m) fishing vessel was destroyed by fire in Icy Strait between Excursion Inlet and Hoonah, Territory of Alaska.
USS PT-22	United States Navy	The patrol torpedo boat was beached and abandoned near Adak in the Aleutian Islands during a williwaw. She was salvaged, repaired, and returned to service.
Seinan Maru	Japan	World War II: The cargo ship was torpedoed and sunk in the Tsugaru Strait by USS Runner (United States Navy).
U-417	Kriegsmarine	World War II: The Type VII submarine was depth charged and sunk in the Atlantic Ocean south east of Iceland (63°20′N 10°30′W) by a Boeing B-17 Flying Fortress aircraft of 206 Squadron, Royal Air Force with the loss of all 46 crew.
HMAS Wallaroo	Royal Australian Navy	The Bathurst-class corvette collided in the Pacific Ocean off Fremantle, Western Australia with Henry Gilbert Costin (United States) and sank with the loss of three crew.

== 12 June ==
List of shipwrecks: 12 June 1943
Ship	State	Description
Birgit	Germany	World War II: The cargo ship was bombed and sunk in the Kerch Strait by Douglas Boston aircraft of the Soviet Air Force.
Palima	Netherlands	World War II: The cargo ship (1,179 GRT, 1922) was torpedoed and sunk in the Mediterranean Sea 30 nautical miles (56 km) south south west of Beirut, Lebanon (33°36′N 35°15′E) by U-97 (Kriegsmarine) with the loss of 26 of her 65 crew.
USS R-12	United States Navy	The R-class submarine sank in a diving accident while conducting torpedo trials in the Florida Strait (24°24′N 81°38′W) south of Key West. 40 crewmen and 2 Brazilian Navy observers died. There were 5 survivors.
U-118	Kriegsmarine	World War II: The Type XB submarine was depth charged and sunk in the Atlantic Ocean (30°49′N 33°49′W) by Grumman TBM Avenger aircraft based on USS Bogue (United States Navy) with the loss of 43 of her 59 crew.

== 13 June ==
List of shipwrecks: 13 June 1943
Ship	State	Description
USCGC Escanaba	United States Coast Guard	World War II: Convoy GS 24: The A-class cutter (1,005 GRT) exploded and sunk in 3 minutes in the Atlantic Ocean (60°50′N 52°00′W). Cause is unknown, probably a drifting mine or an internal explosion. Only two of her 103 crew were saved.
I-9	Imperial Japanese Navy	World War II: The Type A1 submarine was shelled, depth charged, and sunk in the Pacific Ocean off Kiska, Alaska Territory, United States (58°08′N 177°38′E) by USS Frazier (United States Navy). Lost with all 101 hands.
Stadt Emden	Germany	World War II: The cargo ship was bombed and sunk south of Den Helder, North Holland, Netherlands by Royal Air Force aircraft.
Suzuya Maru	Japan	World War II: The coaster was torpedoed and sunk in the Bismarck Sea by USS Guardfish (United States Navy).
V 1109 Mähren	Kriegsmarine	World War II: The Vorpostenboot was bombed, torpedoed and sunk in the North Sea off Den Helder by Royal Air Force aircraft.

== 14 June ==
List of shipwrecks: 14 June 1943
Ship	State	Description
Empire Maiden	United Kingdom	World War II: The Empire Cadet-class coastal tanker was bombed and sunk in the Mediterranean Sea off Pantelleria, Italy. The wreck was sold in 1947 to Italian buyers. Raised in June 1948, repaired and returned to service.
Hellenis	Italy	World War II: The passenger ship was bombed and sunk by aircraft while under repairs at Naples, Italy.
HMMGB 648	Royal Navy	World War II: The Fairmile D motor gun boat (90/107 t, 1943) was bombed and sunk in the Mediterranean Sea off Pantelleria.
Konan Maru	Imperial Japanese Army	World War II: Convoy O-704: The Somedono Maru-class auxiliary troop transport was torpedoed and sunk in the Pacific Ocean (06°05′N 122°23′E) 430 nautical miles (800 km) south east of Palau by USS Sargo (United States Navy). Four crewmen were killed.
M-83	Kriegsmarine	World War II: The M-class minesweeper was sunk after being attacked by British motor torpedo boats, near Jersey Channel Islands at 44°8′N 01°56.9′W. 70 crew were lost.
M-343	Kriegsmarine	World War II: The M-class minesweeper was sunk after being attacked by HMS Ashanti (Royal Navy) and ORP Piorun (Polish Navy) at 0130 hrs, near Jersey, Channel Islands.
Ringulv	Germany	World War II: The cargo ship (4,702 GRT, 1903) was torpedoed and sunk in the Mediterranean Sea off Messina, Sicily, Italy (37°54′N 15°42′E) by HMS United (Royal Navy).
Rosandra	Italy	World War II: The cargo liner was torpedoed by HMS Tactician (Royal Navy) west of Porto Palermo, Albania (40°14′N 19°28′E) and was beached. She was torpedoed again and was declared a total loss. There were 6 dead and 176 survivors.
Sperrbrecher 21 Nestor	Kriegsmarine	World War II: The Sperrbrecher (5,375 GRT) struck a mine and sank in the Gironde Estuary (45°39′N 1°22′W) with the loss of two of her crew.
U-334	Kriegsmarine	World War II: The Type VIIC submarine was depth charged and sunk in the Atlantic Ocean south west of Iceland (58°16′N 28°20′W) by HMS Jed and HMS Pelican (both Royal Navy) with the loss of all 47 crew.
U-564	Kriegsmarine	World War II: The Type VIIC submarine was depth charged and sunk in the Atlantic Ocean north west of Cape Ortegal, Spain (44°17′N 10°25′W) by an Armstrong Whitworth Whitley aircraft of 10 OTU, Royal Air Force with the loss of 28 of her 46 crew. Survivors were rescued by U-185 (Kriegsmarine).
Valentino Coda	Italy	World War II: The cargo ship was torpedoed and sunk in the Adriatic Sea (38°52′N 15°27′E) by HMS Unruly (Royal Navy) with the loss of three lives.

== 15 June ==
List of shipwrecks: 15 June 1943
Ship	State	Description
Athelmonarch	United Kingdom	World War II: The tanker (8,995 GRT, 1928) was torpedoed and sunk in the Mediterranean Sea north west of Jaffa, Palestine (32°20′N 34°39′E) by U-97 (Kriegsmarine) with the loss of four of her 51 crew. Survivors were rescued by Aetos (Hellenic Navy). In December 2017, remnants of the ship were discovered on the sea bottom by marine archeologist Shelley Waxman of the University of Texas.
BTSC-411 Zashchitnik	Soviet Navy	World War II: The Project 53 Type minesweeper was torpedoed and sunk in the Black Sea 20 nautical miles (37 km) west of Sokhumi by U-24 (Kriegsmarine) with the loss of 26 of her 52 crew. Survivors were rescued by SKA-0101 and SKA-0138 (both Soviet Navy).
F 121	Kriegsmarine	World War II: The Marinefährprahm was sunk by a mine off Feodosia, Crimea (44°57′N 35°26′E).
Høegh Silverdawn	Norway	World War II: The cargo ship (7,715 GRT, 1940) was shelled and sunk in the Pacific Ocean south east of the Coco Islands (25°40′S 92°00′E) by Michel (Kriegsmarine) with the loss of 36 of the 58 people aboard.
Koyo Maru	Japan	World War II: The cargo ship was torpedoed and sunk in the East China Sea off Kyushu by USS Gunnel (United States Navy).
M-483	Kriegsmarine	World War II: The M-class minesweeper was bombed and sunk between Sark and Alderney, Channel Islands by Westland Whirlwind aircraft of 263 Squadron, Royal Air Force.
Sanraku Maru	Imperial Japanese Navy	World War II: The fleet oiler was torpedoed and sunk in the Celebes Sea (04°58′N 119°37′E) near Cape Lovieanne, Borneo by USS Trout (United States Navy).
Shinju Maru	Japan	World War II: The cargo ship was torpedoed and sunk in the Pacific Ocean east of Honshu by USS Sailfish (United States Navy).
Tullio	Regia Marina	World War II: The auxiliary minesweeper was torpedoed and sunk in the Mediterranean Sea off Cape Vaticano (38°25′N 15°47′E) by HMS Ultor (Royal Navy). There were three dead and 11 survivors.

== 16 June ==
List of shipwrecks: 16 June 1943
Ship	State	Description
USS LST-340	United States Navy	World War II: The landing ship tank was bombed and heavily damaged off Guadalcanal by nine D3A Val dive bomber aircraft from 582 Kōkūtai (582 Air Group). She was beached at Tenaru and fires put out. Later refloated and towed to California for a rebuild.
MacVeigh	United States	The cargo ship ran aground on a reef at Nizki, Alaska Territory. Pulled off by USS Ute (United States Navy) and taken to Massacre Bay, Alaska Territory.
No. 1353	Nazi Germany	World War II: The lighter was sunk by a mine in the Kerch Strait.
Portmar	United States Army	World War II: Convoy GP 55: The transport was torpedoed and sunk by I-174 (Imperial Japanese Navy) south east of Coff's Harbor off Smoky Cape, New South Wales, Australia. Two of her 67 crew were killed.
San Ernesto	United Kingdom	World War II: The tanker (8,078 GRT, 1939) was torpedoed and shelled in the Indian Ocean south east of the Chagos Archipelago (09°18′S 80°20′E) by I-37 (Imperial Japanese Navy). Her master and 22 crewmen were rescued by Alcoa Pointer (United States). Twelve other survivors sailed in their lifeboats to Fanhandu Island, the Maldives. The abandoned ship drifted for 2,000 nautical miles (3,700 km) before grounding on Nias Island, Sumatra (01°15′N 97°15′E). The wreck was discovered in June 1949.
Terni	Italy	World War II: The passenger ship was torpedoed and sunk off Cape Mollini, Catania by HMS Unison (Royal Navy). 39 crew died. Casualties among passengers are unknown but 4 crew and 5 or 6 passengers were saved.
U-97	Kriegsmarine	World War II: The Type VIIC submarine was depth charged and sunk in the Mediterranean Sea west of Haifa, Palestine (33°00′N 34°00′E) by a Lockheed Hudson aircraft of 459 Squadron, Royal Australian Air Force with the loss of 27 of her 48 crew.

== 17 June ==
List of shipwrecks: 17 June 1943
Ship	State	Description
Ferncastle	Norway	World War II: The tanker (9,940 GRT, 1936) was torpedoed and damaged in the Indian Ocean by LS-4 (Kriegsmarine). She was then torpedoed, shelled and sunk by Michel (Kriegsmarine) with the loss of 24 of her 37 crew. Survivors were taken aboard Michel as prisoners of war.
HV 12	Kriegsmarine	World War II: The HV 11-class guard ship, a former Rendell-class gunboat, was sunk by Allied aircraft at Wielingen.
I-178	Imperial Japanese Navy	World War II: The Kaidai VII type submarine was attacked and sunk in the Pacific Ocean 65 nautical miles (120 km) off Coffs Harbour, New South Wales by two Bristol Beaufort aircraft of 32 Squadron, Royal Australian Air Force. Lost with all 89 hands.
Myoko Maru	Imperial Japanese Navy	World War II: Convoy No. 1142: The Myoko Maru-class auxiliary transport (5,086 GRT 1937) was torpedoed and sunk in the Pacific Ocean 150 nautical miles (280 km) north-north-east of Rabaul, New Guinea (04°04′S 154°03′E) by USS Drum (United States Navy). Thirty-four passengers and a crewman were killed. Survivors were rescued by Asanagi (Imperial Japanese Navy).
Narvik	Germany	World War II: The cargo ship (5,842 GRT, 1940) struck a mine and sank in the Elbe.
USS SC-740	United States Navy	The SC-497-class submarine chaser ran aground and sank on the Great Barrier Reef, off the east coast of Australia (15°32′S 147°06′E).
WBS 1 Hermann	Kriegsmarine	World War II: The weather ship was scuttled in Hansa Bay, Greenland.
Yoma	United Kingdom	World War II: Convoy GTX 2: The troopship was torpedoed and sunk in the Mediterranean Sea north west of Derna, Libya (33°03′N 22°04′E) by U-81 (Kriegsmarine) with the loss of 484 of the 1,961 people aboard. Survivors were rescued by HMAS Gawler, HMAS Lismore (both Royal Australian Navy), HMS MMS-102, HMS MMS-105 (both Royal Navy) and Fort Maurepas (United Kingdom).

== 18 June ==
List of shipwrecks: 18 June 1943
Ship	State	Description
HMS LCT 358	Royal Navy	The landing craft tank Mk 3 (350/640 t, 1942) was lost in the Mediterranean Sea.
HMS LCT 395	Royal Navy	World War II: The landing craft tank Mk 3 (350/640 t, 1942) was wrecked in the Mediterranean Sea after being damaged by a mine.
USS Ronaki	United States Navy	The auxiliary motor schooner/depot ship was wrecked on a reef and sank at Norfolk Island.

== 19 June ==
List of shipwrecks: 19 June 1943
Ship	State	Description
Barbarigo	Regia Marina	World War II: The Marcello-class submarine was sunk in the Bay of Biscay by American aircraft.
Henry Knox	United States	World War II: The Liberty ship was torpedoed and sunk in the Indian Ocean off the Maldives (0°01′S 71°15′E) by I-37 (Imperial Japanese Navy). Twenty-five crewmen and gunners died in the sinking. Survivors sailed in their lifeboats to the Maldives arriving on 30 June. Thirteen gunners and thirteen crewmen died during the journey, with twelve gunners and 29 crewmen surviving the ordeal.
Hong Kong Maru	Imperial Japanese Navy	World War II: The auxiliary gunboat was torpedoed and damaged in the South China Sea off Kyushu by USS Gunnel (United States Navy). She sank on 21 June at 33°13′N 128°45′E.
Miyadono Maru	Imperial Japanese Army	World War II: Convoy P-614: The British WWI B-class standard cargo ship/transport was torpedoed and damaged in the Pacific Ocean 250 nautical miles (460 km; 290 mi) north of Manus Island, Admiralties, Papua New Guinea (01°52′N 148°00′E) by USS Growler (United States Navy). About midnight, after survivors were taken off, she was scuttled by shelling by CH-22 (Imperial Japanese Navy). Three passengers and five crew died.
Miyasho Maru	Japan	World War II: The cargo ship was shelled and sunk in the Pacific Ocean east of Honshu, Japan by USS Sculpin (United States Navy).
Pelotasóide	Brazil	World War II: The cargo ship was torpedoed and sunk in the Atlantic Ocean 5 nautical miles (9.3 km) off Salinas (0°24′S 47°36′W) by U-590 (Kriegsmarine) with the loss of five of her 42 crew. Survivors were rescued by Jundiaí (Marinha do Brasil).
Sagami Maru	Japan	World War II: The cargo ship was shelled and sunk in the Pacific Ocean east of Honshu by USS Sculpin (United States Navy).
Tokiwa Maru	Imperial Japanese Army	World War II: Convoy SHI-809: The Toyooka Maru-class transport ship was torpedoed and sunk in the East China Sea off Kyushu (32°31′N 126°17′E) by USS Gunnel (United States Navy). One crewman was killed.
Uisko	Merivoimat	World War II: The Tursas-class gunboat was sunk in the Gulf of Finland north of the Keri Lighthouse by Soviet aircraft.
UJ 1708 Roland	Kriegsmarine	World War II: The patrol boat was torpedoed and sunk by aircraft off Feistein Lighthouse, Norway.

== 20 June ==
List of shipwrecks: 20 June 1943
Ship	State	Description
Meiten Maru	Imperial Japanese Navy	World War II: The Meiten Maru-class auxiliary transport was torpedoed and sunk in the Pacific Ocean 225 nautical miles (417 km) west north west of Saipan (15°57′N 140°57′E) by USS Tautog (United States Navy).
Olbia	Italy	World War II: The cargo ship was torpedoed and sunk in the Mediterranean Sea by HMS United (Royal Navy).
Santa Maria	United States	World War II: The Type C2 cargo ship struck a mine and was damaged in the Atlantic Ocean 5 nautical miles (9.3 km) west of Dakar, French West Africa with the loss of one of her 87 crew. The survivors abandoned ship, but later reboarded her when she was taken in tow by two Free French Naval Forces tugs. Santa Maria was subsequently repaired and returned to service in December 1943.
Shojin Maru	Japan	World War II: The troopship was torpedoed and sunk in the South China Sea by USS Seawolf (United States Navy).
U-388	Kriegsmarine	World War II: The Type VIIC submarine was depth charged and sunk in the Atlantic Ocean south east of Cape Farewell, Greenland (57°36′N 31°20′W) by a United States Navy Consolidated PBY Catalina aircraft with the loss of all 47 crew.
USS YF-401	United States Navy	The self-propelled covered lighter sank in a storm in the Atlantic Ocean (35°07′N 69°00′W) between North Carolina and Bermuda.

== 21 June ==
List of shipwrecks: 21 June 1943
Ship	State	Description
Brinkburn	United Kingdom	World War II: Convoy TE 22: The cargo ship (1,598 GRT, 1924) was torpedoed and sunk at Algiers, Algeria (36°53′N 2°22′E) by U-73 (Kriegsmarine) with the loss of 29 of her 31 crew.
Foula	Kriegsmarine	World War II: The Norwegian-crewed cargo ship (109 GRT, 1910) was bombed and damaged in Varangerfjord by Messerschmitt Bf 109 aircraft of the Luftwaffe while trying to escape into Soviet Union waters. Two of the four people aboard were killed. Foula was later scuttled by TKA-13 (Soviet Navy).
Hong Kong Maru	Imperial Japanese Navy	World War II: The Hong Kong Maru-class auxiliary gunboat was sunk by an explosion, possibly a mine or torpedo, in the Pacific Ocean two nautical miles (3.7 km; 2.3 mi) off Ojika Jima Lighthouse (33°13′N 128°45′E).
Salvatore Primo	Regia Marina	World War II: The tug (716 GRT) was torpedoed and sunk in the Mediterranean Sea off Cape Figari, Sardinia by Beaufighters of the Royal Air Force.
Venezia	Sweden	World War II: The cargo ship (1,673 GRT) was torpedoed and sunk in the South Atlantic 300 nautical miles (560 km) south east of Rio de Janeiro, Brazil (25°50′S 38°38′W) by U-513 (Kriegsmarine). All 27 people aboard were rescued by a British merchant ship.

== 22 June ==
List of shipwrecks: 22 June 1943
Ship	State	Description
I-7	Imperial Japanese Navy	World War II: The Junsen III (I-7-class) submarine was shelled and damaged by USS Monaghan (United States Navy), then she ran aground on Twin Rocks, Vega Bay, Kiska, Alaska with the stern sinking. Her bow was scuttled with demolition charges the next day. Eighty-seven crewmen were killed.
Lot	Free French Naval Forces	World War II: Convoy UGS 10: The Tarn-class oiler was torpedoed and sunk in the Atlantic Ocean (23°56′N 43°10′W) by U-572 (Kriegsmarine) with the loss of 23 of her 136 crew. Survivors were rescued by USS Merrimack (United States Navy) and another vessel.
USS LST-333	United States Navy	World War II: Convoy Elastic: The landing ship tank was torpedoed and damaged in the Mediterranean Sea 8 nautical miles (15 km) off Cape Corbelin, Algeria (36°59′N 4°01′E) by U-593 (Kriegsmarine) with the loss of 25 of the 288 people aboard. She was taken in tow by USS LST-19 and USS LST-244 (both United States Navy) and beached at Dellys. She sank on 6 July during a salvage attempt.
USS SC-751	United States Navy	The SC-497-class submarine chaser ran aground on a reef off Cape Range, Australia (21°56′S 113°53′E). One officer drowned while all other crew were saved. The ship sank on 16 September during salvage operations.

== 23 June ==
List of shipwrecks: 23 June 1943
Ship	State	Description
USS Aludra	United States Navy	World War II: The Crater-class cargo ship was torpedoed and sunk in the Solomon Sea 50 nautical miles (93 km) south of the eastern tip of San Cristobal Island (11°35′S 162°08′E) by Ro-103 (Imperial Japanese Navy) with the loss of two of her 198 crew. Survivors were rescued by USS Skylark (United States Navy).
USS Deimos	United States Navy	World War II: The Crater-class cargo ship was torpedoed and damaged in the Solomon Sea 50 nautical miles (93 km) south of the eastern tip of San Cristobal Island (11°35′S 162°08′E) by Ro-103 (Imperial Japanese Navy). She was scuttled by USS O'Bannon at 11°26′S 162°01′E, with survivors rescued by USS Skylark (both United States Navy).
DB-6	Soviet Navy	The No. 1-class landing boat was lost on this date.
Pomo	Italy	World War II: The cargo ship was torpedoed and sunk in the Mediterranean Sea (37°10′N 15°19′E) by HMS Unshaken (Royal Navy).
Sagara Maru	Imperial Japanese Navy	World War II: The auxiliary seaplane tender was torpedoed and damaged off Mikomoto Island south east of Cape Omaezaki Lighthouse, Honshu by USS Harder (United States Navy). She was beached the next day 1.5 nautical miles (2.8 km) south west of Kaketsuka Lighthouse (33°45′N 138°10′E). The ship was torpedoed again on 4 July by USS Pompano (United States Navy) while still beached, getting hit by two more torpedoes. Declared a total loss and abandoned on 1 September.
Shetland	United Kingdom	World War II: The cargo ship (1,846 GRT, 1921) was bombed and sunk in the Atlantic Ocean 2.5 nautical miles (4.6 km) off Cape St. Vincent, Portugal by a Focke-Wulf Fw 200 aircraft of I Staffeln, Kampfgeschwader 40, Luftwaffe with the loss of four of her 34 crew.
UJ 2212 Pescagel	Kriegsmarine	World War II: The submarine chaser was torpedoed and sunk in the Mediterranean Sea Allied aircraft.
Volturo	United Kingdom	World War II: The cargo ship (3,424 GRT, 1914) was bombed and sunk in the Atlantic Ocean 1 1/2 nautical miles (2.8 km) west north west of Cape St. Vincent, Portugal by a Focke-Wulf Fw 200 aircraft of I Staffeln, Kampfgeschwader 40 with the loss of three of her 46 crew.

== 24 June ==
List of shipwrecks: 24 June 1943
Ship	State	Description
British Venture	United Kingdom	World War II: The tanker (4,696 GRT, 1930) was torpedoed and sunk by I-27 (Imperial Japanese Navy) in the Gulf of Oman south east of Jask, Iran (25°13′N 58°02′E). Five gunners and 37 crewmen were killed. One gunner and eighteen crewmen were rescued by Varela (United Kingdom).
Jeane	United States	The 36-gross register ton, 58.8-foot (17.9 m) motor cargo vessel was destroyed by fire at Cordova, Territory of Alaska.
Jürgensby	Germany	The cargo ship foundered off Cape Arkona, Germany.
U-119	Kriegsmarine	World War II: The Type XB submarine was depth charged, rammed and sunk in the Bay of Biscay (44°59′N 12°24′W) by HMS Starling (Royal Navy) with the loss of all 57 crew.
U-194	Kriegsmarine	World War II: The Type IXC/40 submarine was depth charged and sunk in the Atlantic Ocean south west of Iceland (59°00′N 26°18′W) by a United States Navy Consolidated PBY Catalina aircraft with the loss of all 54 crew.
U-200	Kriegsmarine	U-200 World War II: The Type IXD2 submarine was depth charged and sunk in the Atlantic Ocean south west of Iceland (58°15′N 25°25′W) by a Consolidated B-24 Liberator aircraft of 120 Squadron, Royal Air Force with the loss of all 68 crew.
U-449	Kriegsmarine	World War II: The Type VIIC submarine was depth charged and sunk in the Atlantic Ocean north west of Cape Ortegal, Spain (45°00′N 11°59′W) by HMS Kite, HMS Wild Goose, HMS Woodpecker and HMS Wren (all Royal Navy) with the loss of all 49 crew.

== 25 June ==
List of shipwrecks: 25 June 1943
Ship	State	Description
Iburi Maru	Japan	World War II: The cargo liner was torpedoed and sunk in the Pacific Ocean east of Honshu by USS Sailfish (United States Navy).
Iris	Italy	World War II: The cargo ship was sunk by Allied aircraft at Messina, Sicily. She was refloated in 1947-48, repaired and returned to service.
Nisr	Egypt	World War II: The sailing ship (80 GRT) was shelled and sunk in the Mediterranean Sea off Gaza by U-81 (Kriegsmarine). The two crew members both survived.

== 26 June ==
List of shipwrecks: 26 June 1943
Ship	State	Description
Crystal	United Kingdom	World War II: The 100-foot (30 m), 149-ton trawler was sunk by a mine 12 miles (19 km) off Scarborough, Yorkshire. Survivors were picked up by Vivacious (Royal Navy) the next day.
Lebed	Soviet Union	World War II: The drifter was badly damaged by German Focke-Wulf Fw 190 fighter-bomber aircraft off Cape Gorodetsky, Barents Sea and sank after reaching shallow waters. There were three wounded.
HMS MGB 644	Royal Navy	World War II: The Fairmile D motor torpedo boat (90/107 t, 1942) was damaged by a mine in the Mediterranean Sea west of Sicily and scuttled.
MO-121	Soviet Navy	World War II: The MO-4-class patrol vessel was badly damaged by German Focke-Wulf Fw 190 fighter-bomber aircraft off Cape Gorodetsky, Barents Sea and was scuttled some hours later. Of her 29 crew, 11 were killed and 17 wounded.
Nelly	Syria	World War II: The sailing ship (80 GRT) was shelled and sunk in the Mediterranean Sea by U-81 (Kriegsmarine). All crew survived.
Shinryu Maru	Imperial Japanese Navy	World War II: The transport ran aground in heavy weather off Matsuwa-To (48°02′N 153°17′E). The storm continues for the next three days. On 29 June the stranded ship caught fire, blew up and sank (48°06′N 153°15′E). Two Daihatsu barges rescued 11 crewmen and some military passengers. 97 military passengers and 32 crewmen were killed.
Shozan Maru	Imperial Japanese Navy	World War II: Convoy No. 3625: The Imperial Japanese Navy-requisitioned cargo ship was torpedoed and sunk in the Pacific Ocean 20 nautical miles (37 km) west of Hachijo Jima off Honshu (33°13′N 139°30′E) by USS Jack (United States Navy). 60 crewmen were killed.
Snetok	Soviet Union	World War II: The motor boat was sunk by German Focke-Wulf Fw 190 fighter-bomber aircraft off Cape Gorodetsky, Barents Sea. There was one wounded.
Toufic Allah	Syria	World War II: The sailing ship (75 GRT) was shelled and sunk in the Mediterranean Sea 40 nautical miles (74 km) west south west of Beirut, Lebanon by U-81 (Kriegsmarine). All crew survived.
Toyo Maru	Imperial Japanese Navy	World War II: Convoy No. 3625: The Toyo Maru-class auxiliary transport was torpedoed and sunk in the Pacific Ocean 20 nautical miles (37 km) west of Hachijo Jima off Honshu (33°13′N 139°30′E) by USS Jack (United States Navy). One crewman was killed. Survivors were rescued by Koan Maru (Imperial Japanese Navy).

== 27 June ==
List of shipwrecks: 27 June 1943
Ship	State	Description
RFA Abbeydale	Royal Fleet Auxiliary	World War II: Convoy XTG 2: The tanker (8,299 GRT, 1937) was torpedoed and damaged in the Mediterranean Sea (36°53′N 1°55′E) by U-73 (Kriegsmarine). She was beached at Algiers, Algeria. Later repaired and returned to service in 1944.
Michalios	Greece	World War II: The cargo ship (3,742 GRT) was torpedoed and sunk in the Mediterranean Sea 3 nautical miles (5.6 km) west of Latakia, Syria (35°33′N 35°38′E) by U-81 (Kriegsmarine) with the loss of one crew member.
Quirinale	Italy	World War II: The cargo liner was bombed and beached at Santa Maura, Greece. She was broken up in Greece after the end of World War II.
Sebastian Cermeno	United States	World War II: The Liberty ship (7,194 GRT) was torpedoed and sunk in the Indian Ocean (28°50′S 50°20′E) by U-511 (Kriegsmarine). Three crew were killed and one fatally wounded in the attack. The 70 survivors boarded 3 lifeboats and one died of exposure before the 3 were respectively rescued by Theodore Parker (United States), a Royal Australian Navy destroyer and a Royal Navy corvette or reached land in their lifeboats in the following weeks.
Strassburg	Germany	World War II: The cargo ship was sunk during an air raid at Hamburg, Germany, by Royal Air Force aircraft. She was refloated on 14 August, repaired and returned to service.

== 28 June ==
List of shipwrecks: 28 June 1943
Ship	State	Description
Bari	Regia Marina	World War II: The Pillau-class cruiser was bombed and sunk at Livorno by aircraft of the United States Eighth Air Force.
Campania	Italy	World War II: The cargo ship was bombed and sunk at Livorno by aircraft of the United States Eighth Air Force.
Dah Puh	Norway	World War II: The cargo ship (1,974 GRT, 1922) was torpedoed, broke in two and sunk by I-27 (Imperial Japanese Navy) in Muscat Harbour, Oman. Her bow sank immediately and the stern sank several hours later. Forty-four crewmen were killed.
Linz	Kriegsmarine	World War II: The minelayer was sunk by limpet mines placed by saboteurs, while under construction in Odense, Denmark. Later raised and repaired.
Shotoku Maru	Japan	World War II: The cargo ship was torpedoed and sunk in the Pacific Ocean west of Rota, Marianas Islands by USS Tunny (United States Navy).
Tenkai Maru	Imperial Japanese Navy	World War II: The scout ship was torpedoed and sunk in the Pacific Ocean between Truk and Rabaul, New Guinea by USS Peto (United States Navy).
V 2019 Adolf Hitler	Kriegsmarine	World War II: The Vorpostenboot was bombed and severely damaged in the Scheldt and was consequently beached.
Vernon City	United Kingdom	World War II: The cargo ship (4,748 GRT, 1929) was torpedoed and sunk in the Atlantic Ocean (4°30′S 27°30′W) by U-172 (Kriegsmarine). All 52 crew were rescued by Aurora M (Brazil).

== 29 June ==
List of shipwrecks: 29 June 1943
Ship	State	Description
Bolzaneto	Italy	World War II: The cargo ship (2,220 GRT) was torpedoed and sunk by HMS Sportsman (Royal Navy) in the Mediterranean Sea off Bonassola, Italy (44°10′N 9°34′E). 16 crew and 6 gunners were killed. There were 14 survivors.
USCGC CG-83421	United States Coast Guard	The 83-foot patrol boat (44 GRT) collided with SC-1330 (United States Navy) 7 nautical miles (13 km) north of the Great Isaac Light (26°14′N 79°05′W) losing part of her stern. She sank two hours later whilst under tow. No lives were lost.
USS Redwing	United States Navy	World War II: The Lapwing-class minesweeper (965 GRT) was heavily damaged by a mine and sank under tow in the Mediterranean Sea off Bizerte, Algeria (37°19′N 9°55′E). Five crew were killed.
Shinryu Maru	Imperial Japanese Army	The Tenryu Maru-class auxiliary transport (4,935 GRT) ran aground on 26 June in heavy weather while trying to anchor off Matsuwa-To, Kuriles (48°02′N 153°17′E). In the next few days, her crew tried unsuccessfully to break free of the grounding. Just after midnight on 29 June an explosion due to unknown cause set the ship afire. Most survivors tried to swim to Banjo-jima in cold and stormy seas, some being picked up by two Daihatsu barges. At 0330 hrs, fire detonated ammunition and the ship blew up and sank. 32 crewmen and 97 passengers and gunners died.

== 30 June ==
List of shipwrecks: 30 June 1943
Ship	State	Description
USS Hulbert	United States Navy	USS Hulbert The seaplane tender, a former Clemson-class destroyer, was driven ashore in Massacre Bay on the coast of Attu Island in the Aleutian Islands in a storm and was severely damaged. She later was refloated, repaired, and returned to service.
Imperial	United States	The 7-gross register ton, 31.9-foot (9.7 m) fishing vessel sank at Juneau, Territory of Alaska.
MFK-5701	Germany	World War II: The fishing vessel was captured in the Black Sea by ShCh-201 (Soviet Navy) and scuttled by holing the bottom.
USS McCawley	United States Navy	World War II: The McCawley-class attack transport was torpedoed and damaged in the Pacific Ocean off Rendova Island, New Georgia by Japanese aircraft with the loss of fifteen of her 1,295 crew. Survivors were rescued by USS Farenholt and USS Ralph Talbot (both United States Navy). Later that day, USS McCawley was torpedoed and sunk in the Blanche Channel by USS PT-118 and USS PT-153 (both United States Navy), which had been erroneously informed that there were no friendly ships operating in that stretch of water.

== Unknown date ==
List of shipwrecks: Unknown date June 1943
Ship	State	Description
HMS Kingston	Royal Navy	World War II: The bow and stern sections of the K-class destroyer – which had been a constructive total loss since her sinking by German aircraft in drydock at Malta on 11 April 1942 and had already had her midships section scrapped – were scuttled as blockships between Selmun headland and Selmunett Island (or St Paul's Island) in northern Malta.
USS Runner	United States Navy	World War II: The Balao-class submarine was never heard from again after departing Midway Atoll for a patrol area in the Kuril Islands and in the waters off northern Japan. She apparently was lost on or sometime after 22 June.
