= P Henderson & Company =

House flag. Adopted during the Crimean war when their ships served both French and English armies as transports. A reversed French tricolour with a Union flag

P. Henderson & Company, also known as Paddy Henderson, was a ship owning and management company based in Glasgow, Scotland and operating to Burma and New Zealand. Patrick Henderson started business in Glasgow as a merchant at the age of 25 in 1834. He had three brothers. Two were merchants working for an agent in the Italian port of Leghorn; the third, George, was a sea captain with his own ship.

The brothers together invested in their first ship, the Peter Senn, and the business grew from there. Patrick died in 1841, and the business was taken over by his brother, Captain George Henderson. In 1848, George took into partnership a young man of outstanding ability, James Galbraith, who expanded the business from merchants, to ship owners and ship managers.

The Company started trading to New Zealand in 1854 with sailing ships carrying British emigrants, and the Royal Mail.

== Albion Shipping Company Ltd ==
In 1860, there being little cargo from New Zealand to Scotland, P. Henderson & Co started to call at Burma with a regular service. This trade grew so quickly that in order to raise further capital, several new partners came in to form the Albion Shipping Company Ltd as ship owners. The vessels were managed by P. Henderson & Co.

The Albion Shipping Company became the dominant British company in the New Zealand trade, and holders of the mail contract.

In 1869 the Suez Canal was opened, making steamships more economic on the Glasgow – Burma route, so in 1870 P. Henderson & Co. started a steamship service between Glasgow, Liverpool and Burma. No mail contract was available on this route as all mail went via India.

In 1874 the British and Burmese Steam Navigation Company Ltd (BBSN) was formed to increase the capital and spread the risk of the Burmese side of the business as it grew from the era of sailing ships into more expensive and much larger steamships. BBSN took over the fleet of steamships on the Burma route, and appointed P. Henderson and Co as managing agents. Most of the shares in the new company were taken up by P. Henderson partners and their associates. Ships' Masters were encouraged to take shares. Peter Denny took about a fifth of the capital.

1882 saw P. Henderson and Co. pioneer the first frozen meat shipment from New Zealand to London. It used refrigerated sailing ships, because as yet there were no coaling stations en route, and without them a steamship would have to have such large coal bunkers that they would take up too much valuable cargo space.

== Shaw, Savill & Albion Line ==
Nevertheless, steam propulsion increased trading possibilities and capital requirements that were beyond the capabilities of P. Henderson or the Albion Shipping Company to fulfil on their own, and so in 1882, the Albion Shipping Company amalgamated with Shaw Savill and Company to form the Shaw, Savill and Albion Company Ltd. After the amalgamation, P. Henderson & Co remained as managers and loading brokers for the new company in Glasgow. British and Burmese Steam Navigation Company Ltd remained as a shipowning company along with another member of the group, the Burmah Steam Ship Company Ltd.

James Galbraith, the driving force of P. Henderson & Co, died in 1884. His death marked the end of an era of private capital, of pioneering and of expansion into unknown countries and technologies.

== P Henderson ships lost ==
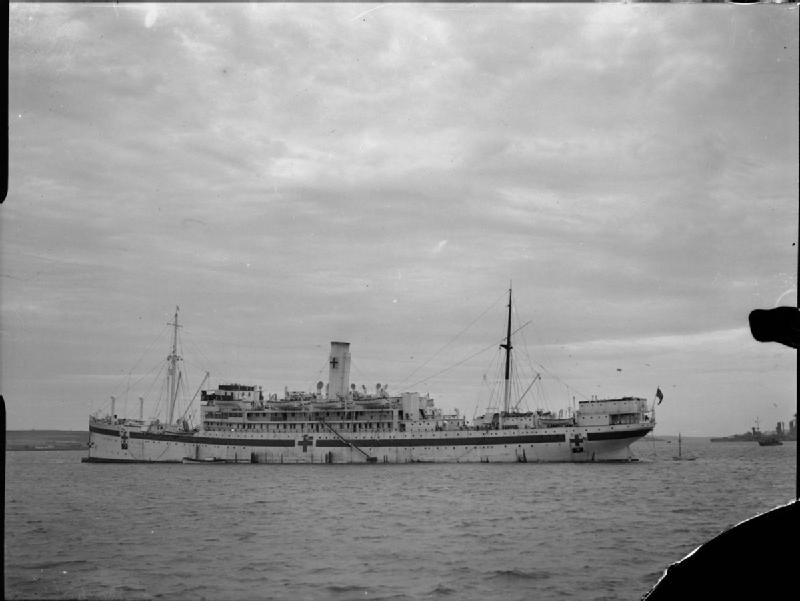
The liner Amarapoora was built in 1920. In the Second World War she became a hospital ship, and this photo shows her as such at Scapa Flow. She was bought by the Ministry of Transport in 1946; became an emigrant ship in 1948; was renamed Captain Hobson in 1951; and scrapped in 1959.

In 1905 a P Henderson steamship, the cargo ship Ava, ran aground and was wrecked 9 nautical miles (17 km) off Maulmain in Burma. Henderson's quickly replaced the ship with a new Ava built the following year, but the new ship's career was cut short in the First World War, when she disappeared in January 1917 with the loss of all 92 persons aboard. There is no Imperial German Navy record of her sinking, but she is presumed to have been sunk off the south coast of Ireland.

That year P Henderson lost one more ship to enemy action. On 8 July 1917 the U-boat SM U-57 torpedoed the passenger and cargo ship Pegu off the south coast of Ireland. Fortunately all but one of those aboard survived. Just after the Armistice with Germany P Henderson lost another ship: on 19 December 1918 the passenger and cargo ship Tenasserim was destroyed by fire in Rangoon. In the 1920s and '30s P Henderson had a number of new ships built, including a new Pegu in 1921.

P Henderson suffered greater losses in the Second World War. On 24 November 1939 the Pegu ran around in the area of the Crosby Channel off Liverpool. She broke her back and was wrecked in separate bow and stern sections. On 13 July 1940 the German auxiliary cruiser Atlantis sank the passenger and cargo liner Kemmendine in the middle of the Indian Ocean by shellfire.

On 9 April 1942 the passenger ship Sagaing was in Trincomalee in Ceylon when aircraft from a Japanese aircraft carrier attacked her and set her afire. Her crew abandoned ship and then she was sunk by shellfire. The Sagaing was raised by the Sri Lankan Eastern Naval Command unit in March 2018. On 1 August 1942 the cargo ship Kalewa collided with the Dutch liner Boringia off the coast of South Africa. Kalewa sank but Boringia survived the collision and rescued everyone aboard.

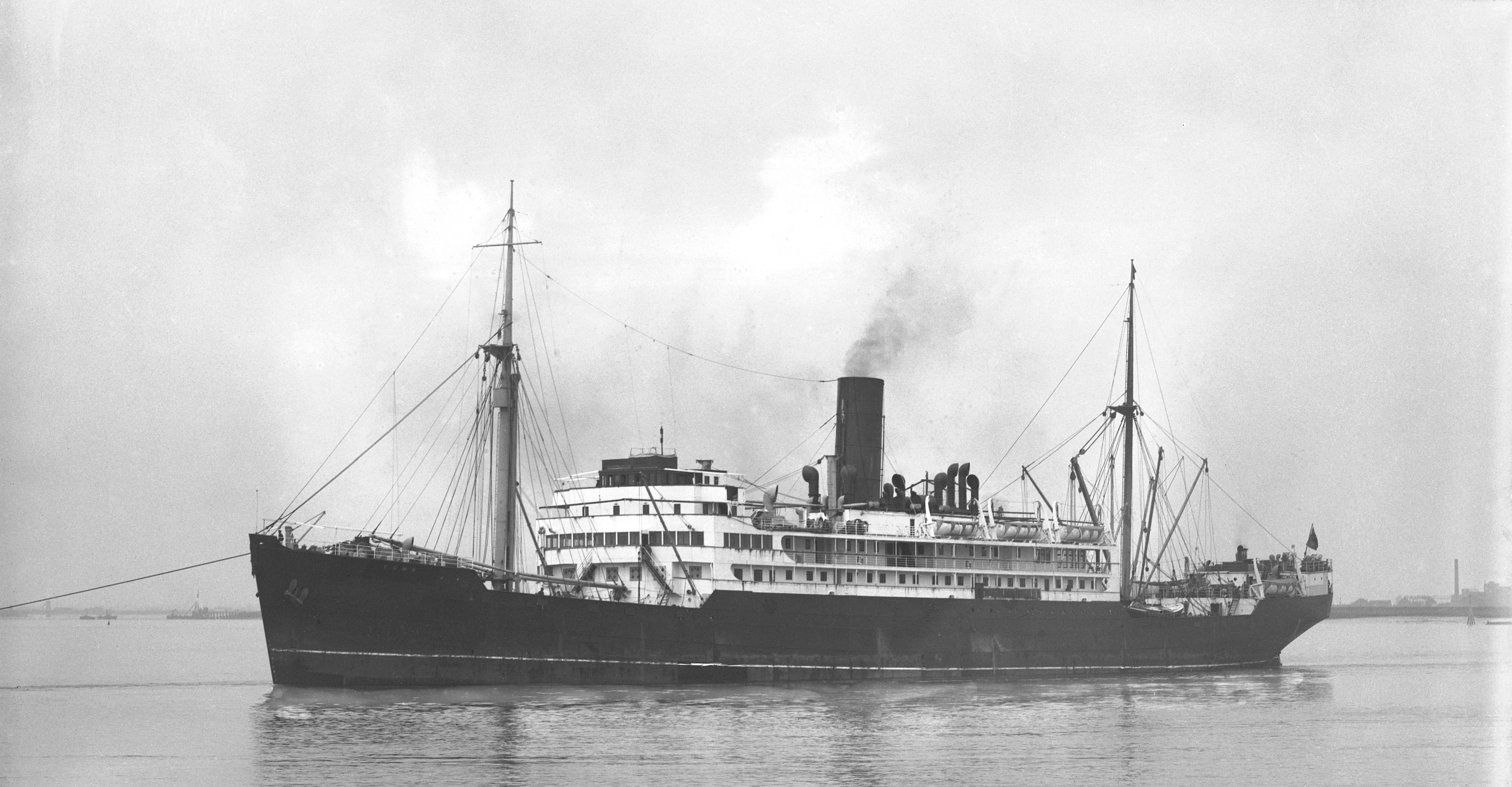
The liner Yoma, built in 1928, became a troop ship in 1941, and was sunk with great loss of life in 1943.

P Henderson's heaviest losses were in 1943. On 2 April U-124 sank the cargo ship Katha by torpedo off the coast of Portugal, killing six of her crew. On 9 May U-123 sank the cargo and passenger ship Kanbe by torpedo off the coast of West Africa, killing all 66 people aboard. On 17 June U-81 sank the passenger ship Yoma in the Mediterranean. Yoma had been converted into a troopship, and the sinking killed 484 people. On 24 July U-199 sank the cargo ship Henzada by torpedo off the coast of Brazil, killing two members of the crew.

== Elder, Dempster Lines ==
Elder, Dempster Lines chartered P Henderson's fleet from 1947 and took over the company in 1952. Under Elder, Dempster modernisation of the P Henderson fleet continued, with new motor ships being delivered until at least 1961.

In 1965 Ocean Steamship Co acquired control of the Elder, Dempster group. In 1967 after the Six-Day War Egypt closed the Suez Canal, so Ocean SS Co discontinued the Burma route and transferred Henderson's last three ships to Elder, Dempster. By 1970 all stock had been transferred to Elder, Dempster and the Henderson name vanished from the shipping trade.

== See also ==
- Irrawaddy Flotilla Company
- SR Merchant Navy Class 35009 Shaw Savill – steam locomotive named after the shipping company

== Bibliography ==
- Haws, Duncan (1995). The Burma Boats: Henderson and Bibby. Merchant Fleets. Vol. 29. Hereford: Travel Creatours Ltd Publications. ISBN 0-946378-26-6.
- Laird, Dorothy (1961). Paddy Henderson. Glasgow: George Outram and Company.
- Spong, Henry C; Osborne, Richard H (2011). Shaw, Savill & Albion: A Fleet History – incorporating the Albion Line; Shaw, Savill & Company; John Leslie; Walter Savill and his ships, Crusader Shipping Company; Aberdeen & Commonwealth Line. Windsor: World Ship Society. ISBN 9780956076939.
