= SS Birka =

SS Birka is the name of the following ships:

- SS Birka (1937), a German passenger ship used as a hospital ship in World War II, sunk by a naval mine in 1943
- SS Main (1926), a 964-ton cargo ship completed in January 1927 by Stettiner Oderwerke in Stettin, Germany. Norwegian ownership under the name Røyksund from 1947, resold in 1955 to German owners and renamed Birka. Delivered to ship breakers for scrapping in April 1961.

== See also ==
- Birka (disambiguation)
