= SS Sagaing =

British steamship sunk in World War II

History

United Kingdom
- Name: Sagaing
- Namesake: Sagaing
- Owner: British & Burmese SN Co
- Operator: P Henderson & Co
- Port of registry: Glasgow
- Route: Glasgow or Liverpool – Rangoon
- Builder: Wm Denny & Bros, Dumbarton
- Yard number: 1167
- Launched: 12 December 1924
- Completed: 13 March 1925
- Identification: UK official number 144845; until 1933: code letters KSHN; by 1930: call sign GLDZ
- Fate: Damaged by air raid 1942; scuttled 1943; raised and scuttled again 2018.

General characteristics
- Type: passenger & cargo liner
- Tonnage: 1930: 7,994 GRT, 4,978 NRT, 10,330 DWT
- Length: 454.6 ft (138.6 m)
- Beam: 61.2 ft (18.7 m)
- Depth: 31.0 ft (9.4 m)
- Decks: 2
- Installed power: as built: triple-expansion engine; 521 NHP.; 1939: as above, plus exhaust steam turbine
- Propulsion: 1 × screw
- Speed: 1939: 14 knots (26 km/h)
- Capacity: 137 passengers
- Crew: 120
- Sensors & processing systems: by 1930: wireless direction finding; by 1936: echo sounding device

SS Sagaing was a British passenger and cargo steamship that was launched in Scotland in 1924. Her peacetime route was a scheduled service between Glasgow or Liverpool, and Rangoon (now Yangon). In 1942, Japanese aircraft damaged her in Trincomalee Harbour in the Easter Sunday Raid on Ceylon. In 1943 she was scuttled to form a pier. In 2018 her wreck was raised, removed from the harbour, and scuttled in deeper water.

== Building and specifications ==
Sagaing was one of a family of similarly sized liners that William Denny and Brothers of Dumbarton on the River Leven built for P Henderson & Company, which operated as Henderson Line. These were Amarapoora, Pegu, Kemmendine and Yoma, completed in 1920, 1921, 1924 and 1928 respectively. Each was about 8,000 gross register tons (GRT) and carried cargo as well as passengers. The ships were managed by the British and Burmese Steam Navigation Company.

Denny's built Sagaing as yard number 1167. She was launched on 12 December 1924 and completed on 13 March 1925. Her registered length was 454.6 ft (138.6 m), her beam was 61.2 ft (18.7 m), and her depth was 31.0 ft (9.4 m). Her tonnages were 7,994 GRT, 4,978 NRT and 10,330 DWT. She carried a crew of 120 and had berths for 137 passengers. Henderson Line employed British officers; lascar ratings; on Sagaing's final voyage, the carpenter was Chinese. She had a straight stem, clipper stern, two masts, one funnel and light-lift derricks for her cargo hatches fore and aft.

Sagaing had a single screw. Three single-ended Howden boilers supplied superheated steam to her main engine, that was a Denny's three-cylinder triple-expansion engine, rated at 521 NHP. In 1939 a Bauer–Wach exhaust steam turbine was added, which drove the same shaft as the piston engine, via double-reduction gearing and a Föttinger fluid coupling. This increased her fuel efficiency and gave her a top speed of 14 kn (26 km/h; 16 mph).

Henderson Line registered Sagaing in Glasgow. Her UK official number was 144845 and her code letters were KSHN. By 1930 her call sign was GLDZ and by 1934 this had superseded her code letters. By 1930, her navigation equipment included wireless direction finding. By 1936, she was also equipped with an echo sounding device.

== War convoys ==
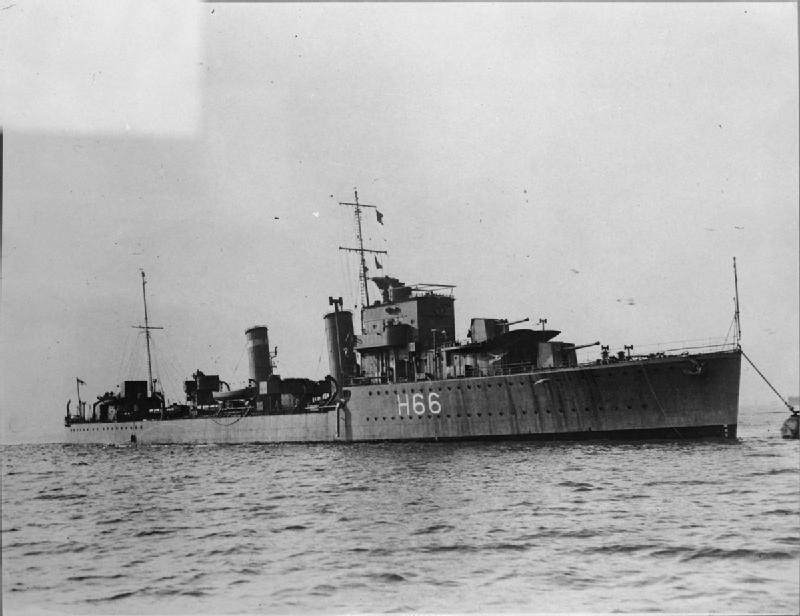
HMS Escort

Sagaing's peacetime route was a scheduled service between Glasgow or Liverpool, and Rangoon, via the Suez Canal. In 1934–35, the ports of call on the route were Gibraltar, Marseille, Port Said, and Port Sudan. On 1 October 1939, Sagaing left Port Said as one of 24 ships in Convoy Blue 3, which reached Gibraltar on 11 October. There she joined Convoy HG3, which left Gibraltar on 13 October for Liverpool. U-boats attacked HG3 on 17 October. U-46 sank Ellerman Lines' City of Mandalay; U-37 sank Bibby Line's Yorkshire; and U-48 sank Clan Line's Clan Chisholm. On the night of 18 October, U-48 fired torpedoes at Sagaing, but missed. Some of her passengers put women and children into a lifeboat, and tried to lower it. The lifeboat capsized before reaching the water, and several of its occupants drowned. The destroyer HMS Escort joined Sagaing and escorted her away, and Sagaing safely completed her voyage to Liverpool.

Sagaing continued her normal route, but using convoys in each direction for the leg of her voyage between Britain and Gibraltar. She left Liverpool for Rangoon on 8 November 1939 with outward bound Convoy OB 32, which at sea became OG 6 to Gibraltar. She returned via Gibraltar in Convoy HG 16F, which reached Liverpool on 28 January 1940. She left Liverpool again on 24 February 1940 with Convoy OB 98, which became OG 20F.

However, on 10 May, Germany invaded France and the Low Countries. The UK anticipated that Italy would join the war on Germany's side, so it started to divert merchant shipping to avoid the Mediterranean. Sagaing returned from Rangoon via the Cape of Good Hope and the South Atlantic, and called at Freetown in Sierra Leone, where she joined Convoy SL 35. This left Freetown on 8 June, and reached Liverpool on 25 June. On 10 June, Italy declared war against France and the UK; and on 22 June, France capitulated. This effectively closed the Mediterranean to Allied merchant shipping. Sagaing continued to sail via the Cape of Good Hope. On her homeward voyages she continued to go via Freetown, joining Convoy SL 54 which left on 4 November 1940, and SL 73 which left on 27 April 1941.

On what became her final homeward voyage, Sagaing was diverted even further. She sailed via the western Atlantic, calling at Saint Lucia, Hampton Roads, and Halifax. There she joined Convoy HX 160, which left Halifax on 15 November 1941, and reached Liverpool on 30 November. From 19 December 1941 to 7 February 1942, Sagaing was in Glasgow for repairs.

== Final voyage ==
On 14 December 1941, the Japanese invasion of Burma began. On 10 February 1942, Sagaing left Glasgow carrying a cargo that included disassembled Hawker Hurricanes; a large quantity of ammunition; mines; and about 2,300 depth charges. The depth charges were stowed as deck cargo, forward of her main superstructure. They were mounted on quick-release sledges, with 50 depth charges on each sledge, in order to be jettisoned overboard in the event of an emergency. She also carried 20,000 cases each of Allsopp beer and Johnnie Walker Red Label whisky. On 11 February she joined Convoy OS 19 from Liverpool, which took her as far as Freetown. She called at Cape Town from 12 to 13 March; Durban from 16 to 19 March; and Colombo in Ceylon from 1 to 3 April. Singapore fell on 15 February, followed by Rangoon on 7 March. As a result, Sagaing's wireless operators received numerous Admiralty signals, warning of an increased risk of naval and air attacks in the Indian Ocean from a Japanese fleet operating in the Strait of Malacca.

By April 1942, Sagaing was under Ministry of War Transport control. Also, Henderson Line was seeking to transfer her from the British & Burmese Steam Navigation Company to the Burmah Steamship Co, Ltd, to avoid Board of Trade shipping regulations. A Browning anti-aircraft gun had been supplied as DEMS armament, but its installation on her poop deck had not been carried out. Before she sailed for Ceylon, her owners had removed most of her safety equipment and stock of emergency spares.

Overnight from 3 to 4 April, Sagaing moved from Colombo to Trincomalee. She kept close to the coast as a precaution against Japanese sea or air attack. In thick fog on 4 April she reached Trincomalee on the east coast of Ceylon, where a pilot guided her to the munitions anchorage at Malay Cove to await orders of where to go from Ceylon. She tried to leave port on 5 April, but returned the next day.

== Attack and scuttling ==
Over the next few days there was a series of false alarms of Japanese attacks, the last of which was on the morning of 9 April. An all-clear signal was given, but shortly thereafter, aircraft of the Japanese Navy's Kidō Butai ("Mobile Strike Force") attacked Trincomalee Harbour. The first wave of the attack on Sagaing caused explosions fore and aft, and incapacitated her Master, Captain O'Hara, who was on her bridge. A second attack strafed the ship, leaving her listing to starboard and down by her bow.

Her engine room flooded, and twisting of her hull jammed its watertight doors shut. The third attack run blew open her cargo hatches, exposing her volatile cargo of alcohol and munitions. Her crew started to neutralise each depth charge's detonator so that the charges could be safely jettisoned, and to prepare her lifeboats to be lowered. Fire spread through hatchways across her decks, and toward her crew quarters. After about 15 minutes they abandoned ship, by which time her hull plates were glowing red.

Sagaing briefly righted herself, but then listed more steeply. Air trapped below decks vented violently, separating her deck plates, and forming a cloud of mud and rust. Shortly afterwards, fire reached the munitions that had not been dumped overboard, and the ship exploded. What remained of her slowly drifted toward the shore of Malay Cove. The attack lasted almost half an hour. It killed three members of Sagaing's crew, and the wife and baby son of one of the junior deck officers.

Despite the severity of the damage, most of Sagaing's cargo of aircraft and ammunition was salvaged. On 24 August 1943, her hulk was scuttled in 35 feet (11 m) of water to form a pier.

== Salvage and re-scuttling ==
On 11 September 2017, the Eastern Command of the Sri Lanka Navy was tasked with salvaging and relocating the wreck, to make room to expand the harbour. Captain Krishantha Athukorala, Command Diving Officer of the Eastern Command, headed the operation, which was supervised by senior diver A Liyanage. The hulk was strengthened, and a prefabricated artificial side to the ship was installed in order to make the wreck watertight enough below deck level to de-water and refloat her. The operation took five months; permanently employed a team of 98 divers; and used a crane barge lent by the Tokyo Cement Company. The wreck was refloated on 22 March. It was then towed out of the harbour, and on 30 March 2018 it was re-scuttled in deeper water to conserve it.

== Bibliography ==
- Bertke, Donald A.; Smith, Gordon; Kindell, Don (2011). World War II: Sea War: The Nazis Strike First. Vol. I. Dayton, OH: Bertke Publications. ISBN 978-0-57-802941-2.
- Harnack, Edwin P. (1930) [1903]. All About Ships & Shipping: A Handbook of Popular Nautical Information (4th ed.). London: Faber and Faber. OCLC 936635033.
- Harnack, Edwin P. (1938) [1903]. All About Ships & Shipping: A Handbook of Popular Nautical Information (7th ed.). London: Faber and Faber. OCLC 901816420.
- Konstam, Angus; Showell, Jak P Mallmann (2002). 7th U-Boat Flotilla: Donitz's Atlantic Wolves. Spearhead. Vol. VII. Shepperton: Ian Allan Publishing. ISBN 978-0-71-102957-6.
- Lloyd's Register of Shipping: Steamers & Motorships of 300 tons gross and over (PDF). Vol. II. London: Lloyd's Register of Shipping. 1930 – via Southampton City Council.
- Lloyd's Register of Shipping: Steamers & Motorships of 300 tons gross and over (PDF). Vol. II. London: Lloyd's Register of Shipping. 1934 – via Southampton City Council.
- Lloyd's Register of Shipping: Steamers & Motorships over 300 tons (PDF). Vol. II. London: Lloyd's Register of Shipping. 1936 – via Southampton City Council.
- Lloyd's Register of Shipping: Steamers & Motorships of 300 tons. Trawlers, tugs, dredgers, &c (PDF). Vol. II. London: Lloyd's Register of Shipping. 1939 – via Southampton City Council.
- Mercantile Navy List. London: Crew List Index Project. 1930 – via Crew List Index Project.
- Robertson, Douglas; Robertson, Dougal (2005). "Prologue 1942: The loss of the Saigang". The Last Voyage of the Lucette. Dobbs Ferry, NY: Sheridan House. pp. 15–26. ISBN 978-1-57-409206-6.
