= SS Empire Dunstan =

World War II merchant ship of the United Kingdom

History
- Name: Empire Dunstan
- Owner: Ministry of War Transport
- Operator: Christian Salvesen & Co Ltd
- Port of registry: (United Kingdom) Grangemouth
- Builder: Grangemouth Dockyard Co Ltd
- Launched: 19 November 1941
- Completed: January 1942
- Maiden voyage: 30 March 1942
- Out of service: 18 November 1943
- Identification: United Kingdom Official Number 168796; Code Letters BCWN
- Fate: Torpedoed and sunk

General characteristics
- Type: Cargo ship
- Tonnage: 2,887 GRT; 1,695 NRT
- Length: 315 ft 5 in (96.14 m)
- Beam: 46 ft 5 in (14.15 m)
- Draught: 20 feet 10 1/4 inches (6.356 m)
- Depth: 23 ft 0 in (7.01 m)
- Installed power: 275 nhp
- Propulsion: Triple expansion steam engine
- Crew: 32, plus 7 DEMS gunners.
- Armament: One 4-inch or 4.7-inch gun, two Bofors guns, two machine guns, one kite.

Location where Empire Dunstan was torpedoed and sunk off Italy.

Empire Dunstan was a 2,887 GRT cargo ship that was built in 1941 by Grangemouth Dockyard Co Ltd, Grangemouth, Stirlingshire, United Kingdom for the Ministry of War Transport (MoWT). Entering service in January 1942, she served until November 1943, when she was torpedoed and sunk by U-81.

== Description ==
Empire Dunstan was built in 1941 by Grangemouth Dockyard Co Ltd, Grangemouth, Stirlingshire.

Empire Dunstan was 315 feet 5 inches (96.14 m) long, with a beam of 46 feet 5 inches (14.15 m). She had a depth of 23 feet 0 inches (7.01 m) and a draught of 20 feet 10 1/4 inches (6.356 m). She was assessed at 2,887 GRT, 1,695 NRT.

Empire Dunstan was propelled by a 275 nhp triple expansion steam engine, which had cylinders of 20 inches (51 cm), 31 inches (79 cm) and 55 inches (140 cm) diameter by 39 inches (99 cm) stroke. The engine was built by North East Marine Engine Co (1938) Ltd, Newcastle upon Tyne.

Armament consisted a 4-inch or 4.7-inch gun, two Bofors guns, two machine guns and a kite.

== History ==
Empire Dunstan was launched on 19 November 1941 and completed in January 1942. She was allocated the United Kingdom Official Number 168796 and Code Letters BCWN. Her port of registry was Grangemouth and she was placed under the management of Christian Salvesen & Co Ltd, Leith, Midlothian. Her crew consisted of 32 officers and men, plus seven DEMS gunners.

Empire Dunstan made her maiden voyage on 30 March 1942, when she joined Convoy EN 65, which departed from Methil, Fife that day and arrived at Oban, Argyllshire on 1 April. She left the convoy at Loch Ewe and joined Convoy On 82, which had departed from Liverpool, Lancashire on 2 April and arrived at Halifax, Nova Scotia, Canada on 18 April. Her destination was St. John's, Newfoundland where she arrived on 14 April. She departed from St. John's on 25 April as a member of Convoy CL 27, which arrived at Halifax on 28 April. Empire Dunstan departed two days later with Convoy XB 15, which arrived at Boston, Massachusetts, United States on 2 May. She left the convoy at Saint John, New Brunswick, arriving that day. She departed from St. John on 13 May and joined Convoy BX 16, which had departed from Boston that day and arrived at Halifax on 14 May. Laden with a cargo of flour, she departed on 24 May as a member of Convoy HX 191, which arrived at Liverpool on 6 June. She left the convoy at the Clyde, arriving on 5 June.

Empire Dunstan departed from the Clyde on 16 June to join Convoy ON 104, which had departed from Liverpool that day and arrived at Boston on 2 July. She left the convoy at Halifax, on 2 July and then joined Convoy HS 21, which departed on 5 July and arrived at Sydney, Cape Breton, Nova Scotia, two days later. She then joined Convoy SQ 18, which departed on 10 July and arrived at Father Point, Quebec on 13 July. She left the convoy at Clarke City, Quebec on that day. Empire Dunstan sailed a week later to join Convoy QS 19, which had departed from Father Point on 19 July and arrived at Sydney on 22 July. Carrying a cargo of woodpulp, she departed two days later with Convoy SC 67, which arrived at Liverpool on 7 August. Her destination was London, which was reached by leaving the convoy at Loch Ewe on 6 August and then sailing with Convoy WN 319 to Methil and FS 877 to Southend, Essex, where she arrived on 11 August.

Empire Dunstan Departed from Southend on 19 August and sailed to Loch Ewe via Convoy FN 791 to Methil and Convoy EN 128 to Loch Ewe, where she arrived on 26 August. She then joined Convoy ON 126, which departed from Liverpool on 29 August and arrived at New York, United States on 18 September. She was carrying a cargo of cement bound for St, John's, where she arrived on 13 September. She sailed a week later with Convoy CL 58, arriving at Sydney on 22 September and departing three days later as a member of Convoy SH 46, which arrived at Halifax on 26 September. She then joined Convoy ON 130, which had departed from Liverpool on 12 September and arrived at New York on 30 September. Empire Dunstan was a member of Convoy SC 105, which departed from New York on 11 October and arrived at Liverpool on 31 October. She was carrying general cargo and her captain was the convoy's Vice-Commodore. She left the convoy at Loch Ewe on 1 November and joined Convoy WN 356, arriving at Methil on 3 November. Empire Dunstan then joined Convoy FS 951, which departed the next day and arrived at Southend on 6 November. She left the convoy at Hull, Yorkshire, on that day.

Empire Dunstan sailed from Hull to Hartlepool, Co Durham on 16 November, departed from there two days later to join Convoy FN 869, which had departed from Southend on 18 November and arrived at Methil on 20 November. She then joined Convoy EN 164 to Loch Ewe and sailed on to the Clyde, arriving on 25 November. Empire Dunstan was a member of Convoy ON 150, which departed from Liverpool on 1 December and arrived at New York on 25 December. She was carrying a cargo of coal.

Empire Dunstan then sailed to Trinidad, leaving New York on 11 January 1943 as a member of Convoy NG 336, arriving at Guantanamo Bay, Cuba on 18 January and then joining Convoy GAT 38 to Trinidad, arriving on 24 January. She arrived at San Pedro de Macorís on 8 February, departing four days later for Guantanamo Bay, arriving on 14 February and sailing two days later for New York, where she arrived on 23 February. Empire Dunstan was a member of Convoy SC 122, which departed from New York on 5 March and arrived at Liverpool on 24 March. She was carrying a cargo of sugar.

Empire Dunstan departed from Liverpool on 2 April and sailed to Cardiff, Glamorgan, where she arrived the next day. She departed from Cardiff on 12 April and sailed to Milford Haven, Pembrokeshire, arriving the next day. Laden with a cargo of coal bound for Algiers, Algeria, she sailed on 14 April to join Convoy OS46 km, which had departed from Liverpool on 15 April and split at sea on 24 April. Convoy OS 46 arriving at Freetown, Sierra Leone on 3 May. Empire Dunstan was in the part of the convoy that formed Convoy KMS 13G, which arrived at Gibraltar on 26 April. She departed that day with Convoy KMS 13, which arrived at Bône, Algeria on 29 April, Empire Dunstan departed from Bône on 26 May to join Convoy GTX 1, which had departed from Gibraltar on 24 May and arrived at Alexandria, Egypt on 4 June. She left the convoy at Bizerta, Algeria, arriving on 30 May. She departed from Bizerta on 5 June for Bône, arriving that day. She departed on 12 June for Philippeville, arriving there the same day and sailing four days later for Bizerta, where she arrived on 24 June. Empire Dunstan departed two days later for Sousse, Tunisia, arriving on 27 June and sailing on 3 July for Sfax, where she arrived the next day. She then sailed to Algiers, from where she departed on 31 July for Malta, departing from there on 4 August for Syracuse, Italy. She departed on 12 August for Malta, arriving the next day and departing two days later to join Convoy GUS 12, which had departed from Alexandria on 10 August and arrived at the Hampton Roads, Virginia, United States on 6 September. She called at Algiers before leaving the convoy at Bône, Empire Dunstan departed then sailed to Philippeville, from where she departed on 21 August for Algiers, arriving the next day.

Empire Dunstan departed from Algiers on 11 October and sailed to Bizerta, arriving on 16 October. She then sailed to Augusta, Italy, joining Convoy HA 6, which departed on 29 October and arrived at Bari two days later. She arrived back at Augusta on 4 November and then sailed to Bône, from where she sailed on 15 November for Augusta, arriving two days later.

Empire Dunstan departed from Augusta on 17 November as a member of Convoy AH 9, which was bound for Bari. She was bound for Brindisi, carrying 1,500 long tons (1,500 t) of military stores (including 700 long tons (710 t) of land mines). There were also three passengers on board. At 17:12 (German time) on 18 November, Empire Dunstan was hit by one of the two torpedoes fired by U-81. Two crewmembers were killed. The ship broke in two and sank in 20 minutes in the Ionian Sea off Taranto (39°24′N 17°40′E). The survivors were rescued by the Norwegian merchant ship Lom and landed at Taranto. Those killed on Empire Dunstan are commemorated on the Tower Hill Memorial, London.
