= HMAS Gawler (J188) =

1941 Bathurst-class corvette

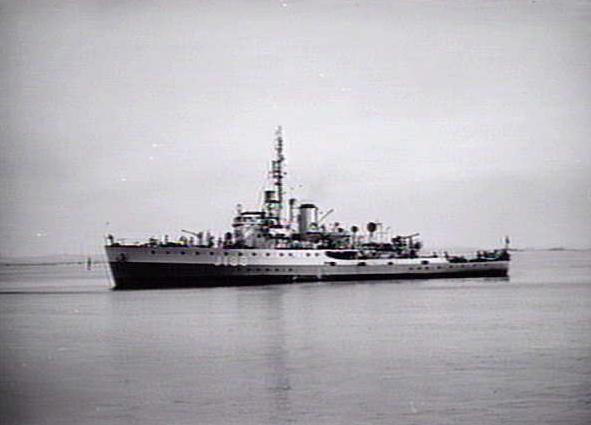
- HMAS Gawler

History

Australia
- Namesake: Town of Gawler
- Builder: BHP, Whyalla
- Laid down: 24 January 1941
- Launched: 4 October 1941
- Commissioned: 14 August 1942
- Decommissioned: 5 April 1946
- Honours and awards: Battle honours: Pacific 1942; Indian Ocean 1942–45; Sicily 1943
- Fate: Transferred to Turkish Navy
- Badge

Turkey
- Name: Ayvalik
- Acquired: 5 April 1946
- Commissioned: 1946
- Decommissioned: 1963
- Fate: Withdrawn from service

General characteristics during RAN service
- Class & type: Bathurst-class corvette
- Displacement: 650 tons (standard), 1,025 tons (full war load)
- Length: 186 ft (57 m)
- Beam: 31 ft (9.4 m)
- Draught: 8.5 ft (2.6 m)
- Propulsion: triple expansion engine, 2 shafts, 2,000 hp
- Speed: 15 knots (28 km/h; 17 mph) at 1,750 hp
- Complement: 85
- Armament: 1 × 12-pounder gun (later replaced by 1 × 4 inch Mk XIX gun); 3 × 20 mm Oerlikons (later increased to 5, then reduced back to 3); 1 × Bofors 40 mm L/60 gun (installed later); Machine guns; Depth charges chutes and throwers

HMAS Gawler (J188/B241/A115), named for the town of Gawler, was one of 60 constructed during World War II and one of 20 Bathurst-class corvettes built for the Admiralty but manned by personnel of and commissioned into the Royal Australian Navy (RAN). The ship was laid down by BHP at its Whyalla shipyard in early 1941, launched later that year, and commissioned in 1942.

After a short assignment to Fremantle as an anti-submarine patrol ship, Gawler was assigned to the British Eastern Fleet as a convoy escort. In April 1943, she was sent to the Mediterranean Sea for minesweeping duties. The corvette participated in the Allied invasion of Sicily, rescued survivors from the torpedoed troopship Yoma, and on one occasion escorted a convoy in the Atlantic. In October, Gawler rejoined the Eastern Fleet and resumed Indian Ocean convoy escort duties. After a refit at the start of 1945, Gawler joined the British Pacific Fleet. At the war's end, the corvette was tasked with mine-clearing and anti=piracy operations around Hong Kong, then sent to the Molucca Islands to inspect former Japanese facilities.

Gawler was decommissioned from the RAN in April 1946. The Admiralty transferred the ship to the Turkish Navy, where she was recommissioned as TCG Ayvalik. The corvette remained in Turkish service until 1963.

== Design and construction ==
In 1938, the Australian Commonwealth Naval Board (ACNB) identified the need for a general purpose 'local defence vessel' capable of both anti-submarine and mine-warfare duties, while easy to construct and operate. The vessel was initially envisaged as having a displacement of approximately 500 tons, a speed of at least 10 knots (19 km/h; 12 mph), and a range of 2,000 nautical miles (3,700 km; 2,300 mi) The opportunity to build a prototype in the place of a cancelled Bar-class boom defence vessel saw the proposed design increased to a 680-ton vessel, with a 15.5 knots (28.7 km/h; 17.8 mph) top speed, and a range of 2,850 nautical miles (5,280 km; 3,280 mi), armed with a 4-inch gun, equipped with asdic, and able to fitted with either depth charges or minesweeping equipment depending on the planned operations: although closer in size to a sloop than a local defence vessel, the resulting increased capabilities were accepted due to advantages over British-designed mine warfare and anti-submarine vessels. Construction of the prototype HMAS Kangaroo did not go ahead, but the plans were retained. The need for locally built 'all-rounder' vessels at the start of World War II saw the "Australian Minesweepers" (designated as such to hide their anti-submarine capability, but popularly referred to as "corvettes") approved in September 1939, with 60 constructed during the course of the war: 36 ordered by the RAN, 20 (including Gawler) ordered by the British Admiralty but manned and commissioned as RAN vessels, and four for the Royal Indian Navy.

Gawler was laid down by the BHP at its Whyalla shipyard on 24 January 1941. She was launched on 4 October 1941 by the wife of Sir Winston Dugan, then Governor of Victoria, and commissioned into the RAN on 14 August 1942. The ship was originally to be named Gambier, for the city of Mount Gambier.

== Operational history ==
=== RAN service ===
Upon entering service in September 1942, Gawler was briefly based at Fremantle as an anti-submarine patrol vessel before being assigned to the British Eastern Fleet and ordered to sail to Colombo. The corvette served in the Indian Ocean as a convoy escort between January and April 1943.

Following this, Gawler and three sister ships were formed into as the 21st Minesweeping Flotilla and sent to the Mediterranean Sea to serve as minesweepers and convoy escorts. On 17 June 1943 when the British troopship Yoma was sunk off the coast of Libya, Gawler and her sister ship HMAS Lismore were among the ships that rescued 1,477 survivors.

In July, Gawler was involved in the Allied invasion of Sicily, and in August the corvette sailed into the Atlantic to meet a Mediterranean-bound convoy. Gawler rejoined the Eastern Fleet in October 1943, and resumed escort duties until January 1945, with the exception of a refit in Durban during January and February 1944.

After leaving the Eastern Fleet, Gawler underwent a four-month refit in Adelaide, before joining the British Pacific Fleet at Manus Island in April 1945. She remained with the Pacific Fleet until after the end of World War II; operating in Hong Kong waters during September with mine-warfare and anti-piracy duties, before sailing to the Molucca Islands and spending the rest of 1945 providing surveillance of former Japanese positions in the area.

Gawler returned to Australian waters in February 1946, and was decommissioned in Sydney on 5 April 1946. The corvette received three battle honours for her wartime service: "Pacific 1942", "Indian Ocean 1942–45", and "Sicily 1943".

=== Turkish Navy service ===
Prior to decommissioning, Gawler was marked for transfer to the Turkish Navy. Upon decommissioning, Gawler was immediately recommissioned into the Royal Navy as HMS Gawler. On 21 May 1946, Gawler, with sister ships Launceston and Pirie, sailed for Colombo, where they were decommissioned from the Royal Navy and commissioned into the Turkish Navy. Gawler was renamed TCG Ayvalik.

The corvette was withdrawn from service in 1963. The name was passed on to sister corvette TCG Antalya (the former Geraldton).
