= Soviet submarine L-22 =

History

Soviet Union
- Name: L-22
- Laid down: 4 December 1938
- Launched: 23 September 1939
- Commissioned: 28 August 1942
- Fate: Scrapped

General characteristics
- Class & type: Leninets-class
- Displacement: 1,108 tons surfaced; 1,400 tons submerged
- Length: 85.3 m (279 ft 10 in)
- Beam: 7 m (23 ft 0 in)
- Draft: 4.05 m (13 ft 3 in)
- Propulsion: Diesel-electric; 2 × diesels; 2 × electric motors; 2 shafts
- Speed: 18 knots (33 km/h) surfaced; 9 knots (17 km/h) submerged
- Range: 10,000 nmi (19,000 km) at 10 kn (19 km/h) surfaced; 150 nmi (280 km) at 2.5 kn (4.6 km/h) submerged
- Test depth: 80
- Complement: 56
- Armament: 1 × 100 mm (3.9 in) L/68 gun; 1 × 45 mm (1.8 in) gun; 8 × 533 mm (21 in) torpedo tubes (6 bow, 2 ext aft); 18 × torpedoes; 20 × mines

Service record
- Part of: Northern Fleet

The World War II Soviet submarine L-22 belonged to the L-class or Leninets class of minelayer submarines. She was part of the last series (Group 4) of her class, having some improvements including more torpedo tubes. For the successes during the war the boat was awarded the Order of Red Banner.

== Service history ==
L-22 scored her success mostly as a minelayer submarine.

Ships sunk by L-22
Date	Ship	Flag	Tonnage	Notes
14 November 1942	Schiff-18 Alteland	(Nazi Germany)	419 GRT	aux. patrol ship (mine)
14 April 1943	Pasvik	(Norway)	238 GRT	tug (mine)
1 June 1943	Schiff-8 Birka	(Nazi Germany)	1,000 GRT	hospital ship (mine)
28 December 1943	R-64	(Nazi Germany)	125 GRT	aux. minesweeper (mine)
Total:			1,782 GRT	

Ships damaged by L-22.
Date	Ship	Flag	Tonnage	Notes
1 September 1943	Rudesheimer	(Nazi Germany)	2,036 GRT	Cargo ship (torpedo)
Total:			2,036 GRT	

== Bibliography ==
- Budzbon, Przemysław; Radziemski, Jan & Twardowski, Marek (2022). Warships of the Soviet Fleets 1939–1945. Vol. I: Major Combatants. Naval Institute Press. ISBN 978-1-68247-877-6.
- Polmar, Norman & Noot, Jurrien (1991). Submarines of the Russian and Soviet Navies, 1718–1990. Naval Institute Press. ISBN 0-87021-570-1.
