= SS Yoma =

British passenger steamship, sunk in the Second World War

Coordinates: 33°02′N 22°02′E

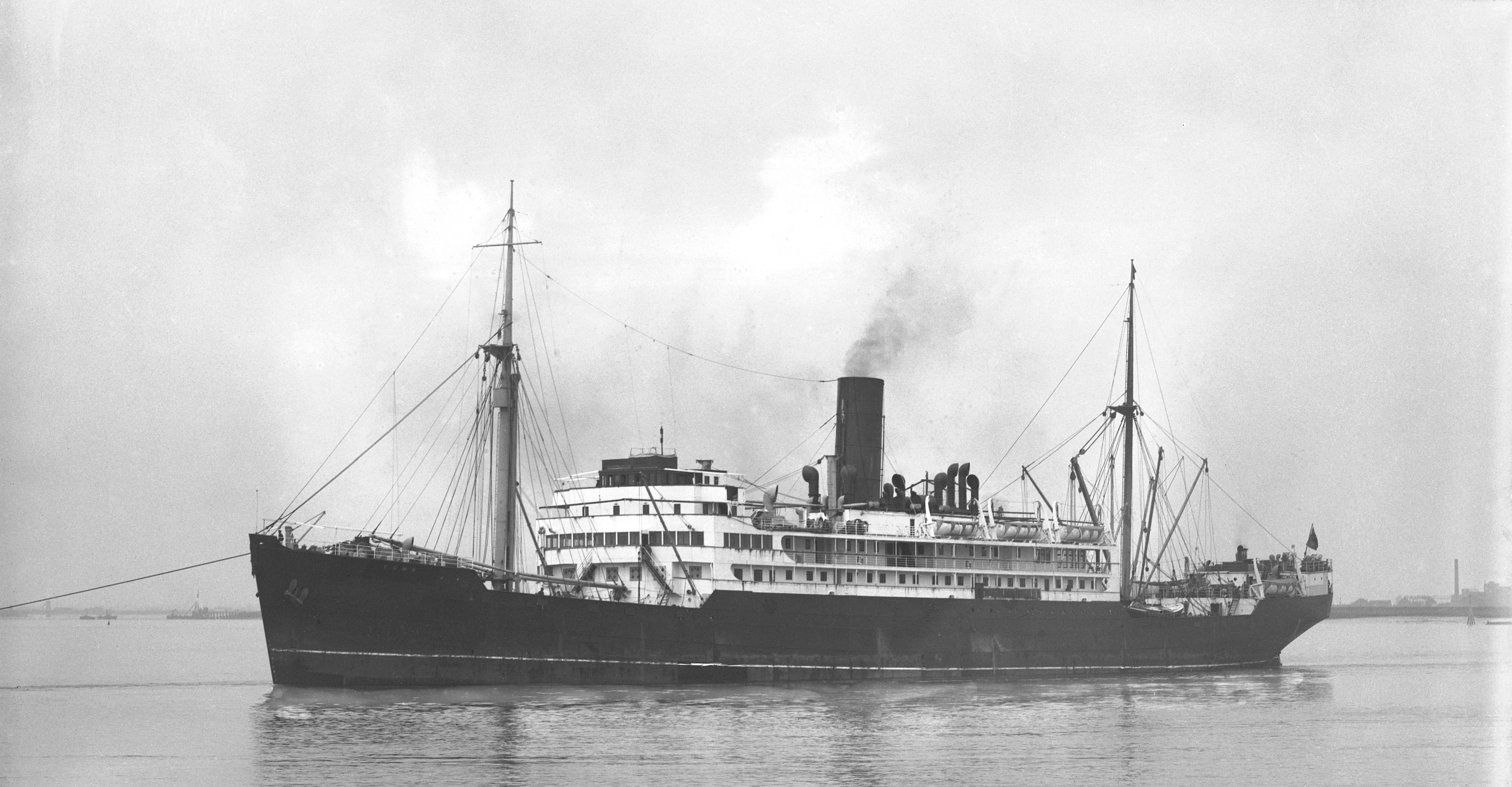
- Yoma in the Scheldt

History

United Kingdom
- Name: Yoma
- Namesake: Yoma, western Burma
- Owner: 1928: British & Burmese SN Co Ltd + Burmah SS Co Ltd; 1933: British & Burmese SN Co Ltd
- Operator: P Henderson & Co
- Port of registry: Glasgow
- Route: Glasgow – Suez Canal – Rangoon
- Builder: W Denny & Bros, Dumbarton
- Cost: £227,891
- Yard number: 1206
- Launched: 2 August 1928
- Completed: 6 October 1928
- Identification: UK official number 160225; until 1933: code letters LCNT; by 1930: call sign GJKS
- Fate: sunk by torpedo, 1943

General characteristics
- Type: passenger ship
- Tonnage: 8,195 GRT, 5,057 NRT
- Length: 460.3 ft (140.3 m)
- Beam: 61.2 ft (18.7 m)
- Depth: 31.0 ft (9.4 m)
- Decks: 2
- Installed power: as built: quadruple expansion steam engine; 550 NHP; by 1939: as above, plus low-pressure steam turbine
- Propulsion: 1 × screw
- Speed: 14 knots (26 km/h)
- Capacity: passengers: 146 × 1st class
- Crew: 1928: 137; 1943: 160 + 8 DEMS gunners
- Sensors & processing systems: as built: wireless direction finding; by 1936: as above, plus echo sounding device
- Armament: DEMS

SS Yoma was a British passenger liner that became a troop ship in the Second World War. She was built in Scotland in 1928, and from then until 1940 ran a regular route between Glasgow in Scotland and Rangoon in Burma via the Suez Canal. She became a troop ship in 1941, and was sunk with great loss of life in the Mediterranean in 1943.

Yoma was run by the Henderson Line of Glasgow. She was managed by P Henderson & Company, and at first owned jointly by two other P Henderson companies: British and Burmese Steam Navigation Company Ltd and Burmah Steam Ship Company Ltd. From 1934, the British and Burmese SN Co Ltd was her sole owner.

Yoma was one of a family of similar liners that William Denny and Brothers of Dumbarton built for Henderson Line. The others were Amarapoora, Pegu, Kemmendine, and Sagaing – completed in 1920, '21, '24 and '25 respectively. Each was about 8,000 GRT, and carried cargo as well as passengers. Yoma was the last of the series to be built, and also the largest.

== Namesakes ==
Yoma was the second of four Henderson ships to be named after the Yoma area of western Burma. The first was the cargo ship Yomah; which was built in 1926; and which Henderson sold in 1927. The third was the turbine steamship Yoma; which was built in 1948; and transferred in 1952 to Elder Dempster Lines. The fourth was a motor ship; which was built in 1958 for Elder, Dempster as Daru; and renamed Yoma in 1965 when she was transferred to Henderson.

== Building and identification ==
Denny's built the ship for £227,891. She was yard number 1206; she was launched on 2 August 1928; and she was completed on 6 October. Her registered length was 460.3 ft (140.3 m); her beam was 61.2 ft (18.7 m); and her depth was 31.0 ft (9.4 m). She had berths for 146 passengers, all in first class. Her tonnages were 8,195 GRT and 5,057 NRT. Her steering engine was electro-hydraulic; and she had a Denny balanced rudder. Whereas Kemmendine and Sagaing had a straight bow, Yoma's was raked, which gave her a slightly more modern profile.

Yoma had a single screw, driven by a quadruple expansion steam engine that was rated at 550 NHP. Her furnaces were equipped to burn either coal or heavy fuel oil. On 5 October 1928 she made her sea trials, on which she achieved 14.43 knots (26.72 km/h). By 1939, an exhaust steam turbine had been added to her machinery. It ran on exhaust steam from the reciprocating engine's low-pressure cylinder, and drove the propeller shaft by double-reduction gearing and an hydraulic coupling.

As built, Yoma was equipped with wireless direction finding. By 1936, she had been fitted with an echo sounding device. She was registered in Glasgow. Her official number was 160225, and her code letters were LCNT. By 1930, her call sign was GJKS; and by 1934, this had superseded her code letters.

== Civilian service at war ==
Henderson Line's route between Glasgow and Rangoon was via Liverpool; Palma; Marseille; and the Suez Canal. For 15 months after the UK's entry into the Second World War, Yoma continued her regular service, but sailing in convoys for parts of her route. On 19 September 1939, she left Liverpool for Rangoon with general cargo and 125 passengers. She sailed with Convoy OB 7 until it dispersed in the North Atlantic, then from Gibraltar as far as Alexandria she sailed with Convoy Green 3. She returned from Rangoon to Britain carrying general cargo, sailing with Convoy HG 10 from Gibraltar to Liverpool for the last leg of her voyage.

In January 1940, Yoma left Liverpool for Rangoon, sailing with Convoy OB 73 which at sea became the fast convoy Convoy OG 15F to Gibraltar. On her return from Rangoon she joined Convoy HG 24 at Gibraltar at the end of March, which reached Liverpool in the first week of April.

Before the end of April, she left Liverpool for Rangoon, sailing with Convoy OB 133 which at sea became the fast convoy Convoy OG 27F to Gibraltar. However, before Yoma's return from Rangoon Italy entered the war, making the Mediterranean unsafe for Allied merchant shipping. She therefore made a longer return voyage via the Cape of Good Hope, the South Atlantic and West Africa. At Freetown in Sierra Leone she joined the fast Convoy SL-39F, which caught up with and joined Convoy SL 39 at sea. SL-39 reached Liverpool at the end of July.

At the end of August 1940, Yoma left Liverpool for Rangoon, sailing with Convoy OB 204 until it dispersed at sea. Using the longer route via the Cape of Good Hope it was not until December that she returned, joining Convoy SL 58 for the homeward leg of the voyage from Freetown to Liverpool.

== Indian Ocean troop ship ==
In January 1941, Yoma was converted into a troop ship. On 18 February carrying 1,628 troops she sailed from the Firth of Clyde with Convoy WS 6B to Freetown, and on 8 April 1941 she left Freetown with Convoy WS 6 to Cape Town. After rounding the Cape of Good Hope she spent the next two years in the Indian Ocean, moving troops mostly between Mombasa, Aden, Bombay, Colombo and Bandar Abbas. In January 1942, Japan invaded the Dutch East Indies; and in February Yoma, took troops from Colombo to Batavia, arriving with Convoy JS 1 and returning with Convoy SJ 5. She also evacuated civilians from the Dutch East Indies to Darwin in Australia. Yoma's final Indian Ocean voyage was with Convoy PA-33 from Bandar Abbas to Aden in April 1943.

== Convoy GTX 2 and loss ==
Approximate position of Yoma's wreck: just off the coast of Cyrenaica, northwest of Derna

On 13 May 1943, Axis forces in Tunisia surrendered, ending the North African Campaign and opening the way for the Allied Invasion of Sicily. Yoma was transferred to the Mediterranean, and on 17 May she sailed with Convoy KMX 14X from Gibraltar to Alexandria.

On 8 June, she again left Gibraltar for Alexandria, this time in Convoy GTX 2. She called at Sfax in Tunisia and Tripoli in Libya, leaving the latter on 16 June. She left Tripoli carrying 134 officers and 994 other ranks of the British Army and 22 officers and 643 ratings of the Free French Naval Forces. Many of the British troops were Royal Engineers, including 994 Dock Operating Company and 1010 Dock Operating Company, who were going to Alexandria to be kitted out and were then to operate port facilities for the Sicilian campaign.

On the morning of 17 June, the convoy was northwest of the port of Derna, Libya. At 0733 hours many of the men were below decks having breakfast when German submarine U-81 commanded by Oberleutnant zur See Johann-Otto Krieg fired two torpedoes. Accounts differ as to what followed. U-boat historian Guðmundur Helgason states that one torpedo hit Yoma, but Second World War blogger Martin Cherrett states that both of them hit her, one in her engine room and the other in her number 4 hold, sinking her within five minutes. Merchant Navy historian Duncan Haws also says both torpedoes hit her. Either way, the Chief Officer, A Olding, reported that she sank rapidly. Olding stated that the explosion destroyed the after engine room bulkhead; rapidly flooding the engine room, boiler room and no. 5 hold, and blowing the hatches of nos. 3 and 4 holds. As men scrambled for safety, the ladders on No. 2 mess deck collapsed, trapping many men below decks.

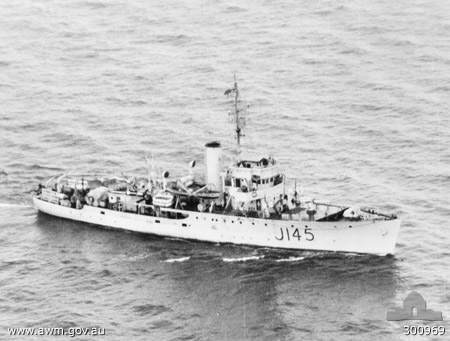
HMAS Lismore, one of the Australian corvettes that rescued survivors

Yoma settled rapidly by her stern, and was shrouded by escaping steam, and clouds of coal dust. Her Master, George Patterson ordered "abandon ship" and Chief Officer Olding was among those who made for their boat stations. Olding and his lifeboat crew succeeded in releasing their boat so that it floated as the ship went down. The ship sank stern first, and as she did, her bow rose more steeply. Olding described:

"...by this time the Yoma was well down by the stern and the next thing I knew she sank under my feet and I found myself in the water... as the boat rose I saw a lot of men on the foc’sle head: they would not jump into the water,... as the bow lifted a number of them lost their footing and fell onto the bridge, many others being dragged under by the ship."

Two of the Royal Engineers having breakfast were Herbert Cullum from County Durham and his friend George Monk. Monk told the Cullum family:

"Bert was at hand's reach from me, when it happened. We all got thrown across seats and on the floor and after I managed to regain my feet, which was very difficult, I looked around for Bert. He was nowhere to be seen... after great difficulty and luck I found myself in the water, and for the one and three quarter hours in which I was drifting around my eyes were constantly looking for Bert, but could not see him."

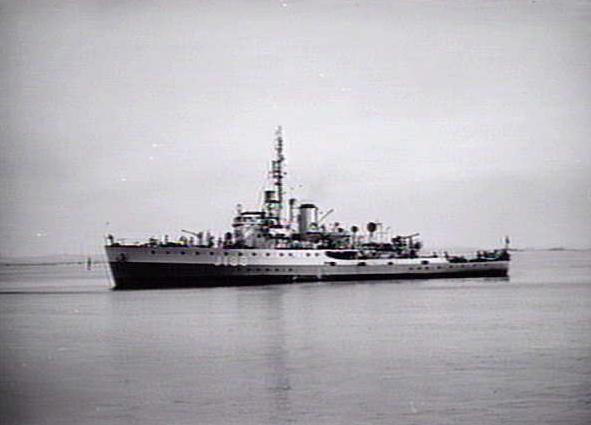
HMAS Gawler, the other Australian corvette that took part in the rescue

484 people were killed: Captain Patterson, 29 crew members, three DEMS gunners and 451 military personnel. Because of the danger from enemy submarines Convoy GTX 2 continued on its way. However, a rescue operation was undertaken by the Royal Australian Navy Bathurst-class corvettes HMAS Lismore and HMAS Gawler, Royal Navy coastal motor minesweepers HMS MMS-102 and HMS MMS-105 and a British-registered merchant ship: the 7,133 GRT Park ship Fort Maurepas. Between them the five vessels rescued 130 crew members, five DEMS gunners, and 1,342 military personnel.

== Monuments ==
Most of the 484 people killed in Yoma's sinking have no known grave. The Brookwood Memorial in Surrey lists those who were UK or Commonwealth military personnel. The Second World War part of the Tower Hill Memorial in the City of London lists those who were members of Yoma's Merchant Navy crew.

== Successor ships ==
In 1948, Henderson's took delivery of a new Yoma, a turbine steamship that at 5,809 GRT was rather smaller than her predecessor. In 1952, Elder Dempster Lines took over Henderson's and transferred Yoma to the Elder Dempster fleet. In 1965, Yoma was sold to Taiwanese owners and renamed Hai Ping. In the same year Elder, Dempster transferred a 1958-built motor ship, the 6,340 GRT Daru, to the Henderson fleet, and renamed her Yoma. Also in 1965, Elder, Dempster took over John Holt & Co and its subsidiary Gulf Guinea Line. In 1966, Elder, Dempster changed Yoma back to Daru, and transferred her to Guinea Gulf Line. In 1979, she was sold to Liberian owners and renamed Lone Eagle. In 1980, she was sold again, and renamed Anjo One. She was scrapped in Pakistan in 1982.

== Bibliography ==
- Haws, Duncan (1990). Elder Dempster Lines. Merchant Fleets. Vol. 20. Hereford: Travel Creatours Ltd Publications. ISBN 0-946378-17-7.
- Haws, Duncan (1995). The Burma Boats: Henderson and Bibby. Merchant Fleets. Vol. 29. Hereford: Travel Creatours Ltd Publications. ISBN 0-946378-26-6.
- Lloyd's Register of Shipping. Vol. II.–Steamers and Motorships. London: Lloyd's Register of Shipping. 1928 – via Internet Archive.
- Lloyd's Register of Shipping (PDF). Vol. II.–Steamers and Motorships. London: Lloyd's Register of Shipping. 1936 – via Southampton City Council.
- Lloyd's Register of Shipping (PDF). Vol. II.–Steamers and Motorships. London: Lloyd's Register of Shipping. 1939 – via Southampton City Council.
- Mercantile Navy List. London: Registrar General of Shipping and Seamen. 1930 – via Crew List Index Project.
- Mercantile Navy List. London: Registrar General of Shipping and Seamen. 1934 – via Crew List Index Project.
- Talbot-Booth, EC (1936). Ships and the Sea (Third ed.). London: Sampson Low, Marston & Co Ltd.
