= HMAS Lismore =

1940 Bathurst-class corvette

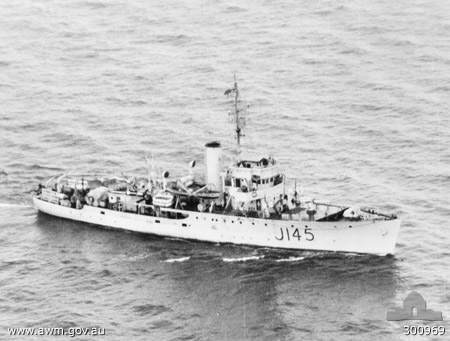
- HMAS Lismore during 1942

History

Australia
- Namesake: City of Lismore, New South Wales
- Builder: Morts Dock & Engineering Co in Sydney
- Laid down: 26 February 1940
- Launched: 10 August 1940
- Commissioned: 24 January 1941
- Decommissioned: 3 July 1946
- Honours and awards: Battle honours: Indian Ocean 1941–44; Sicily 1943; Pacific 1945; Okinawa 1945
- Fate: Transferred to RNLN

History

Netherlands
- Name: Batjan
- Commissioned: 3 July 1946
- Decommissioned: 1958
- Reclassified: Frigate (1946)
- Fate: Removed from service in 1958

General characteristics
- Class & type: Bathurst-class corvette
- Displacement: 650 tons (standard), 1,025 tons (full war load)
- Length: 186 ft (57 m)
- Beam: 31 ft (9.4 m)
- Draught: 8.5 ft (2.6 m)
- Propulsion: triple expansion engine, 2 shafts, 1,750 hp
- Speed: 15 knots (28 km/h; 17 mph)
- Complement: 85
- Armament: 1 × 4 inch Mk XIX gun, 3 × Oerlikon 20 mm cannons (later 4, later 2), 1 × 2-pounder gun (installed later), Machine guns, Depth charges chutes and throwers

HMAS Lismore (J145/B247/A121), named for the city of Lismore, New South Wales, was one of 60 Bathurst-class corvettes that were constructed during World War II, and one of 20 manned and commissioned by the Royal Australian Navy (RAN) under Admiralty order. During her Australian service, Lismore covered 191,132 nautical miles (353,976 km), and spent the longest period away from Australia of any RAN vessel during World War II: 1,409 days. Serving with the RAN for five years, Lismore later spent twelve years as part of the Royal Netherlands Navy (RNLN), classified as the frigate HNLMS Batjan.

== Design and construction ==
In 1938, the Australian Commonwealth Naval Board (ACNB) identified the need for a general purpose 'local defence vessel' capable of both anti-submarine and mine-warfare duties, while easy to construct and operate. The vessel was initially envisaged as having a displacement of approximately 500 tons, a speed of at least 10 knots (19 km/h; 12 mph), and a range of 2,000 nautical miles (3,700 km; 2,300 mi) The opportunity to build a prototype in the place of a cancelled Bar-class boom defence vessel saw the proposed design increased to a 680-ton vessel, with a 15.5 knots (28.7 km/h; 17.8 mph) top speed, and a range of 2,850 nautical miles (5,280 km; 3,280 mi), armed with a 4-inch gun, equipped with asdic, and able to fitted with either depth charges or minesweeping equipment depending on the planned operations: although closer in size to a sloop than a local defence vessel, the resulting increased capabilities were accepted due to advantages over British-designed mine warfare and anti-submarine vessels. Construction of the prototype HMAS Kangaroo did not go ahead, but the plans were retained. The need for locally built 'all-rounder' vessels at the start of World War II saw the "Australian Minesweepers" (designated as such to hide their anti-submarine capability, but popularly referred to as "corvettes") approved in September 1939, with 60 constructed during the course of the war: 36 ordered by the RAN, 20 (including Lismore) ordered by the British Admiralty but manned and commissioned as RAN vessels, and 4 for the Royal Indian Navy.

Lismore was laid down by Morts Dock & Engineering Co in Sydney on 26 February 1940. She was launched on 10 August 1940 by the wife of Commodore Gerard Muirhead-Gould, the Naval-Officer-in-Charge Sydney, and commissioned on 25 January 1941.

== Operational service ==
From December 1941 Lismore operated with the British Eastern Fleet. On 17 June 1943, when the British troopship Yoma was sunk off the coast of Libya, Lismore and her sister ship HMAS Gawler were among the ships that rescued 1,477 survivors. In December 1944, Lismore was assigned to the British Pacific Fleet.

The corvette earned four battle honours for her wartime service: "Indian Ocean 1941–44", "Sicily 1943", "Pacific 1945", and "Okinawa 1945".

Lismore was paid off from RAN service on 3 July 1946, transferring immediately into the Royal Netherlands Navy, where she was renamed HNLMS Batjan and reclassified as a frigate. She was removed from service in 1958.
