= German submarine U-81 (1941) =

Nazi military submarine, 1939–1944

Coordinates: 44°52′N 13°51′E

- U-81

History

Nazi Germany
- Name: U-81
- Ordered: 25 January 1939
- Builder: Bremer Vulkan, Bremen-Vegesack
- Yard number: 9
- Laid down: 11 May 1940
- Launched: 22 February 1941
- Commissioned: 26 April 1941
- Fate: Sunk on 9 January 1944 by US bombers in Pola, Italy.; Wreck raised on 22 April 1944 and scrapped

General characteristics
- Class & type: Type VIIC U-boat
- Displacement: 769 t (757 long tons) surfaced; 871 t (857 long tons) submerged
- Length: 67.10 m (220 ft 2 in) (o/a); 50.50 m (165 ft 8 in) (pressure hull)
- Beam: 6.20 m (20 ft 4 in) (o/a); 4.70 m (15 ft 5 in) (pressure hull)
- Draught: 4.74 m (15 ft 7 in)
- Installed power: 2,800–3,200 PS (2,100–2,400 kW; 2,800–3,200 bhp) (diesels); 750 PS (550 kW; 740 shp) (electric)
- Propulsion: 2 shafts; 2 × diesel engines; 2 × electric motors
- Speed: 17.7 knots (32.8 km/h; 20.4 mph) surfaced; 7.6 knots (14.1 km/h; 8.7 mph) submerged
- Range: 8,190 nmi (15,170 km; 9,420 mi) surfaced; 81 nmi (150 km; 93 mi)submerged
- Test depth: 230 m (750 ft); Calculated crush depth: 250–295 m (820–967 ft)
- Complement: 44 to 52 officers and ratings
- Armament: 5 × 53.3 cm (21 in) torpedo tubes (four bow, one stern); 14 × torpedoes or 26 TMA mines; 1 × 8.8 cm (3.46 in) deck gun (220 rounds); 1 x 2 cm (0.79 in) C/30 AA gun

Service record
- Part of: 1st U-boat Flotilla; 26 April – 30 November 1941; 29th U-boat Flotilla; 1 December 1941 – 9 January 1944
- Identification codes: M 38 099
- Commanders: Oblt.z.S. / Kptlt. Friedrich Guggenberger; 26 April 1941 – 24 December 1942; Oblt.z.S. Johann-Otto Krieg; 25 December 1942 – 9 January 1944
- Operations: 17 patrols: 1st patrol: a. 17 July – 7 August 1941; b. 9 – 13 August 1941; 2nd patrol: a. 27 August – 19 September 1941; b. 29 – 31 October 1941; 3rd patrol: 4 November – 10 December 1941; 4th patrol: 27 January – 4 March 1942; 5th patrol: 4 – 25 April 1942; 6th patrol: 6 May – 3 June 1942; 7th patrol: 6 – 24 June 1942; 8th patrol: 5 October – 16 November 1942; 9th patrol: 24 November – 21 December 1942; 10th patrol: 30 January – 19 February 1943; 11th patrol: 6 March – 7 April 1943; 12th patrol: 6 June – 4 July 1943; 13th patrol: 14 – 25 July 1943; 14th patrol: 1 – 10 August 1943; 15th patrol: 20 September – 13 October 1943; 16th patrol: 10 – 23 November 1943; 17th patrol: 30 Dec 1943 – 3 January 1944
- Victories: 24 merchant ships sunk (41,784 GRT); 1 warship sunk (22,600 tons); 1 auxiliary warship sunk (1,150 GRT); 1 merchant ship total loss (7,472 GRT); 1 merchant ship damaged (6,671 GRT)

German submarine U-81 was a Type VIIC U-boat of the navy (Kriegsmarine) of Nazi Germany during World War II, famous for sinking the aircraft carrier HMS Ark Royal.

== Design ==
German Type VIIC submarines were preceded by the shorter Type VIIB submarines. U-81 had a displacement of 769 tonnes (757 long tons) when at the surface and 871 tonnes (857 long tons) while submerged. She had a total length of 67.10 m (220 ft 2 in), a pressure hull length of 50.50 m (165 ft 8 in), a beam of 6.20 m (20 ft 4 in), a height of 9.60 m (31 ft 6 in), and a draught of 4.74 m (15 ft 7 in). The submarine was powered by two MAN M 6 V 40/46 four-stroke, six-cylinder supercharged diesel engines producing a total of 2,800 to 3,200 metric horsepower (2,060 to 2,350 kW; 2,760 to 3,160 shp) for use while surfaced, two Brown, Boveri & Cie GG UB 720/8 double-acting electric motors producing a total of 750 metric horsepower (550 kW; 740 shp) for use while submerged. She had two shafts and two 1.23 m (4 ft) propellers. The boat was capable of operating at depths of up to 230 metres (750 ft).

The submarine had a maximum surface speed of 17.7 knots (32.8 km/h; 20.4 mph) and a maximum submerged speed of 7.6 knots (14.1 km/h; 8.7 mph). When submerged, the boat could operate for 80 nautical miles (150 km; 92 mi) at 4 knots (7.4 km/h; 4.6 mph); when surfaced, she could travel 8,500 nautical miles (15,700 km; 9,800 mi) at 10 knots (19 km/h; 12 mph). U-81 was fitted with five 53.3 cm (21 in) torpedo tubes (four fitted at the bow and one at the stern), fourteen torpedoes, one 8.8 cm (3.46 in) SK C/35 naval gun, 220 rounds, and a 2 cm (0.79 in) C/30 anti-aircraft gun. The boat had a complement of between forty-four and sixty.

== Building and commissioning ==
She was ordered on 25 January 1939 and laid down on 11 May 1940 at Bremer Vulkan, Bremen-Vegesack, becoming yard number 9. She was launched on 22 February 1941 and commissioned under her first commander, Oberleutnant zur See (Oblt.z.S.) Friedrich Guggenberger, on 26 April of that year. Guggenberger commanded her for her work-ups with the 1st U-boat Flotilla between 26 April and 31 July 1941. She then became a front (operational) boat of the 1st U-boat Flotilla, and set out on a number of training patrols.

== Service history ==
=== Early patrols ===
Her first successes came on her second patrol, which took her from Trondheim into the North Sea and the North Atlantic, before putting into the French port of Brest. During the patrol she attacked Convoy SC 42. She sank the cargo ship Empire Springbuck on 9 September, followed by the motor ship Sally Maersk on 10 September, for a combined total of 8,843 GRT.

U-81 was one of the U-boats ordered into the Mediterranean. Her first attempt to break into the 'Italian Lake' almost ended in disaster, when on 30 October she was attacked and severely damaged by a British Catalina of No. 209 Squadron RAF, as she attempted to cross the Strait of Gibraltar. The Catalina was joined by a Lockheed Hudson, which dropped depth charges onto U-81 causing severe damage and forcing her to return to Brest. There she was repaired to return to the Mediterranean.

=== Sinking the Ark Royal ===
On 4 November U-81 left Brest bound for La Spezia in Italy. On 13 November off Gibraltar, she encountered the inbound ships of Force H. She fired a single torpedo into the aircraft carrier HMS Ark Royal, and then avoided depth charge attacks from the escorts. Despite efforts to salvage her, the Ark Royal had to be abandoned 12 hours after the attack and capsized two hours later and sank. Only one man was killed, by the torpedo explosion. U-81 reached La Spezia on 1 December, where she joined the 29th U-boat Flotilla.

=== Patrols in the Mediterranean ===
Her next patrol was uneventful and resulted in no ships attacked. She sailed again on 4 April 1942 and headed into the eastern Mediterranean. On 16 April she sank the Egyptian sailing ships Bab el Farag and Fatouh el Kher, as well as the British Caspia and the Free French anti-submarine naval trawler Vikings. U-81 sank a further two Egyptian sailing ships, Hefz el Rahman on 19 April and the El Saadiah on 22 April. The U-boat put into port at Salamis in Greece on 25 April, having spent 22 days at sea and sunk 7,582 GRT of shipping. A further patrol from Salamis was uneventful and she returned to La Spezia on another patrol, which saw the sinking of the British Havre on 10 June. U-81's next patrol was into the western Mediterranean. She sank the British Garlinge on 10 November and went on to intercept one of the convoys of Operation Torch (the invasion of French North Africa), sinking the Maron on 13 November.

U-81's next patrol was uneventful and saw her briefly shift operations to Pola (now Pula, Croatia). On 25 December Oblt.z.S. Johann-Otto Krieg took command of U-81 from Guggenberger. She sailed from Pola on 30 January 1943 on her next patrol. On 10 February she damaged the Dutch Saroena and on 11 February she sank four sailing vessels, the Egyptian Al Kasbanah and Sabah el Kheir, the Lebanese Husni and the Palestinian Dolphin. U-81 put into Salamis on 19 February after 21 days at sea, 388 GRT of shipping sunk and 6,671 GRT damaged. Her next patrol sank three more Egyptian sailing vessels, the Bourghieh, the Mawahab Allah and the Rousdi. Her next patrol brought more substantial results, sinking the British troopship Yoma on 17 June killing 484 people, followed by the Egyptian sailing vessel Nisr on 25 June and the Syrian sailing vessels Nelly and Toufic Allah on 26 June. On 27 June she sank the Greek Michalios, but was engaged by shore-based guns off Latakia. Her next patrol saw only the Empire Moon hit on 22 July, but she was declared a total loss and spent the rest of the war under repair. The U-boat's next three patrols were uneventful but on 18 November she sank the cargo ship Empire Dunstan.

== Sinking ==
US bombers attacked U-81 while the submarine was in port in Pula in Croatia, at 1130hrs on 9 January 1944. She sank with two of her crew dead and 51 survivors. The wreck was raised on 22 April 1944 and broken up. She had conducted 17 patrols, sinking 26 ships totalling 42,934 GRT and 22,600 tons, damaging one other totalling 6,671 GRT and causing one total loss totalling 7,472 GRT.

== Summary of raiding history ==
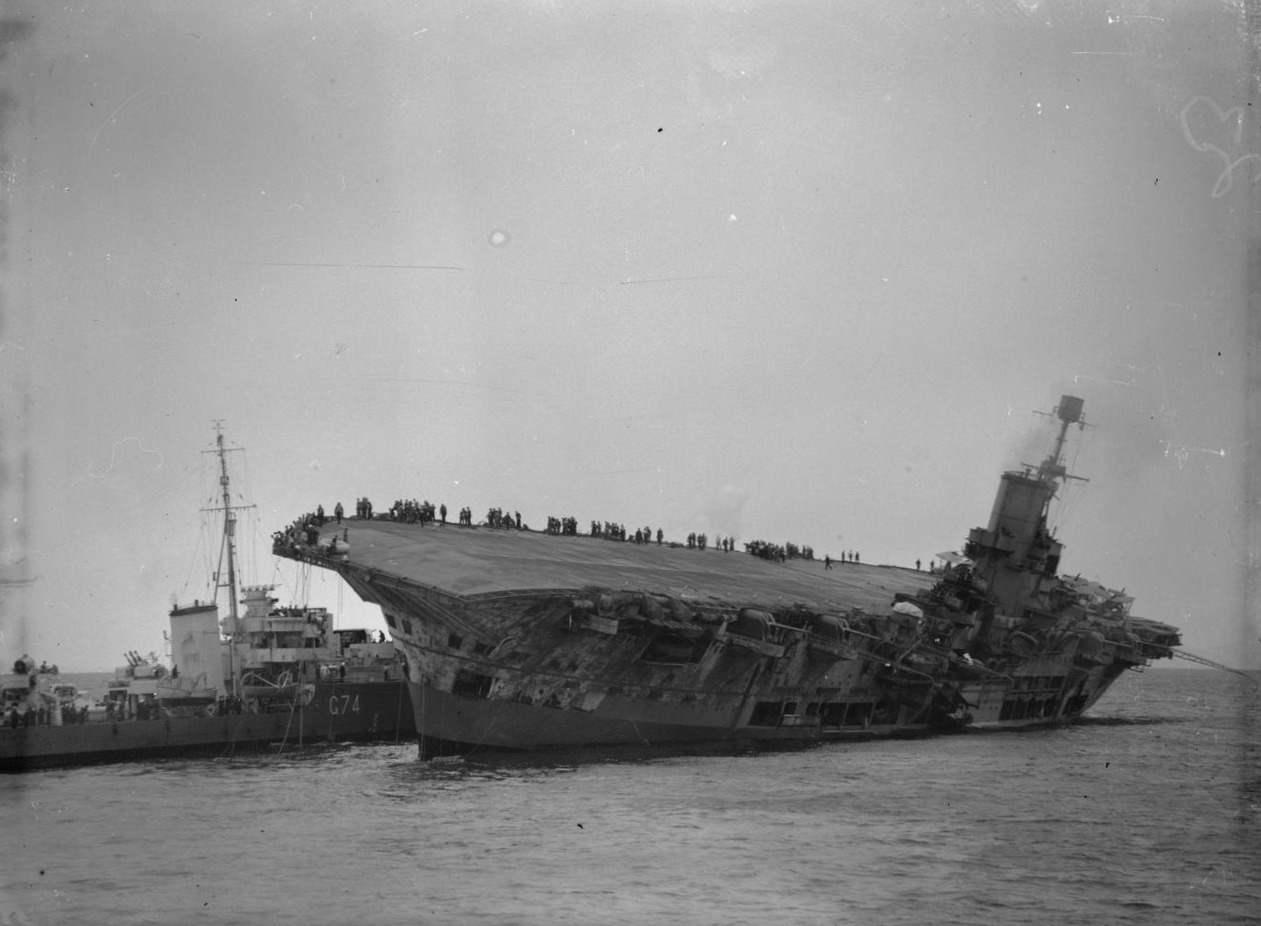
HMS Legion moves alongside the damaged and listing HMS Ark Royal to take off survivors

Date	Ship	Nationality	Tonnage (Note: Merchant ship tonnages are in gross register tons. Military vessels are listed by tons displacement.)	Fate
9 September 1941	Empire Springbuck	United Kingdom	5,591	Sunk
10 September 1941	Sally Mærsk	United Kingdom	3,252	Sunk
13 November 1941	HMS Ark Royal	Royal Navy	22,600	Sunk
16 April 1942	Bab el Farag	Egypt	105	Sunk
16 April 1942	Caspia	United Kingdom	6,018	Sunk
16 April 1942	Fatouhel el Rahman	Egypt	97	Sunk
16 April 1942	FFL Vikings	Free French Naval Forces	1,150	Sunk
19 April 1942	Hefz el Rahman	Egypt	90	Sunk
22 April 1942	El Saadiah	Egypt	122	Sunk
22 April 1942	Aziza	Egypt	100	Sunk
22 April 1942	Havre	United Kingdom	2,073	Sunk
10 November 1942	Garlinge	United Kingdom	2,012	Sunk
13 November 1942	Maron	United Kingdom	6,487	Sunk
10 February 1943	Saroena	Netherlands	6,671	Damaged
11 February 1943	Al Kasbanah	Egypt	110	Sunk
11 February 1943	Dolphin	Palestine	135	Sunk
11 February 1943	Husni	Greater Lebanon	107	Sunk
11 February 1943	Sabah al Kheir	Egypt	36	Sunk
20 March 1943	Bourgheih	Egypt	244	Sunk
20 March 1943	Mawahab Allah	Syria	77	Sunk
28 March 1943	Rouisdi	Egypt	133	Sunk
17 June 1943	Yoma	United Kingdom	8,131	Sunk
25 June 1943	Nisr	Egypt	80	Sunk
26 June 1943	Nelly	Syria	80	Sunk
26 June 1943	Toufic Allah	Syria	75	Sunk
27 June 1943	Michalios	Greece	3,742	Sunk
22 July 1943	Empire Moon	United Kingdom	7,472	Total loss
18 November 1943	Empire Dunstan	United Kingdom	2,887	Sunk

== Bibliography ==
- Busch, Rainer; Röll, Hans-Joachim (1999). German U-boat commanders of World War II: a biographical dictionary. Translated by Brooks, Geoffrey. London, Annapolis, Md: Greenhill Books, Naval Institute Press. ISBN 1-55750-186-6.
- Busch, Rainer; Röll, Hans-Joachim (1999). Deutsche U-Boot-Verluste von September 1939 bis Mai 1945 [German U-boat losses from September 1939 to May 1945]. Der U-Boot-Krieg (in German). Vol. IV. Hamburg, Berlin, Bonn: Mittler. ISBN 3-8132-0514-2.
- Gröner, Erich; Jung, Dieter; Maass, Martin (1991). German Warships 1815–1945, U-boats and Mine Warfare Vessels. Vol. 2. Translated by Thomas, Keith; Magowan, Rachel. London: Conway Maritime Press. ISBN 0-85177-593-4.
- Jameson, William (2004). Ark Royal: The Life of an Aircraft Carrier at War 1939–41. Periscope Publishing Ltd. ISBN 1-904381-27-8.
- Kemp, Paul (1997). U-Boats Destroyed, German Submarine Losses in the World Wars. Arms and Armour. p. 163. ISBN 1-85409-515-3.
- Rossiter, Mike (2007). Ark Royal: the life, death and rediscovery of the legendary Second World War aircraft carrier. London: Corgi Books. ISBN 978-0-552-15369-0.
