= SS Birka (1937) =

German passenger ship built in 1937

History
- Name: Birka
- Owner: Mathies Reederei (1937–40); Kriegsmarine (1940–43)
- Port of registry: (Nazi Germany) Hamburg, Germany (1937–40); Kriegsmarine (1940–43)
- Builder: Flensburger Schiffbauw-Gesellschaft
- Launched: 23 June 1937
- Commissioned: 5 September 1940
- Out of service: 1 June 1943
- Identification: Code Letters DJUF; Kriegsmarine designation "Schiff 8" (1940–43)
- Fate: Struck a mine and sank

General characteristics
- Class & type: Passenger ship (1937–40); Hospital ship (1940–43)
- Tonnage: 1,000 GRT, 508 NRT
- Length: 73.23 metres (240 ft 3 in)
- Beam: 10.39 metres (34 ft 1 in)
- Depth: 3.71 metres (12 ft 2 in)
- Installed power: Compound steam engine, 184nhp
- Propulsion: Single screw propeller

Birka was a German passenger ship built in 1937. She was requisitioned by the Kriegsmarine during the Second World War for use as a hospital ship. She struck a mine and sank in 1943.

== Description ==
The ship was 73.23 metres (240 ft 3 in) long, with a beam of 10.39 metres (34 ft 1 in) and a depth of 3.71 metres (12 ft 2 in). She was powered by a 4-cylinder compound steam engine, which had 2 cylinders each of 37 centimetres (14 9/16 in) and 2 cylinders each of 80 centimetres (31 1/2 in) diameter by 80 centimetres (31 1/2 in) stroke. The engine was built by Flensburger Schiffbau-Gesellschaft, Flensburg, Germany. It was rated at 184nhp and drove a single screw propeller. She was assessed at 1,000 GRT, 508 NRT.

== History ==
Birka was built by Flensburger Schiffbau-Gesellschaft for Mathies Reederei KG, Hamburg, Germany. She was launched on 23 June 1937. Her port of registry was Hamburrg and the Code Letters DJUF were allocated. On 24 November 1937, she ran aground off the coast of Sweden and was severely damaged. She was refloated the next day and taken in to Stockholm for repairs.

On 5 September 1940, Birka was requisitioned by the Kriegsmarine for use as a hospital ship. Allocated to 5 Vorpostengruppe and designated as "Schiff 8", she served in Norwegian waters. On 1 June 1943, she struck a mine and sank in the Altafjord with the loss of 115 lives. The mine had been laid on 6 May by the Soviet submarine L-22. The Stockholms-Tidningen claimed that Birka had been used to carry troops and munitions from Trondheim to Kirkenes in violation of her status as a hospital ship.
