= UG convoys =

Convoys during naval battles of the Second World War

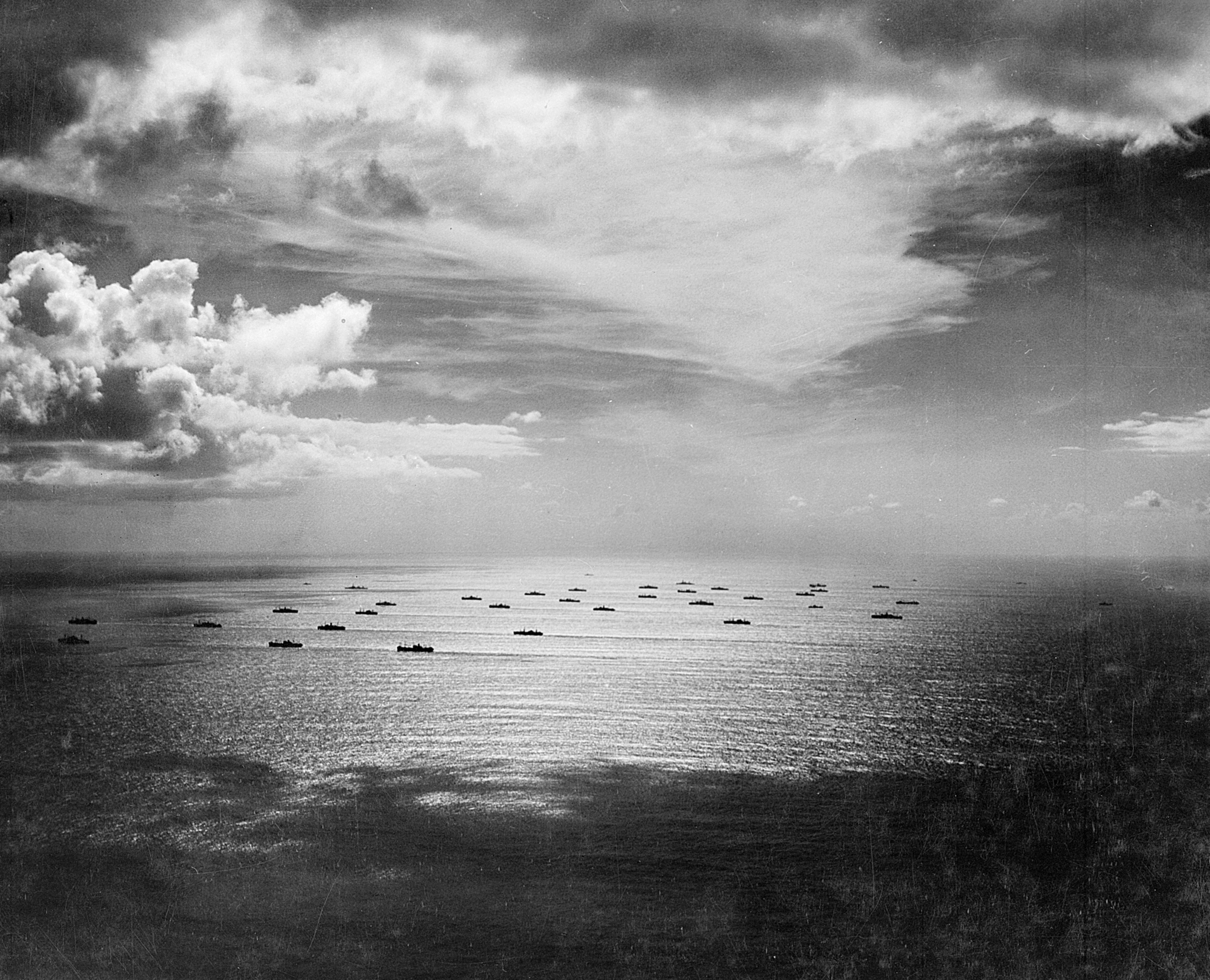
An aerial photo of one of the earliest UG convoys taken in November 1942.

The UG convoys were a series of east-bound Atlantic convoys from the United States to Gibraltar carrying food, ammunition, and military hardware to the United States Army in North Africa and southern Europe during World War II. Convoys assembled in Hampton Roads near the mouth of Chesapeake Bay and terminated in various North African locations as Axis forces retreated from 1942 through 1945.

== Background ==
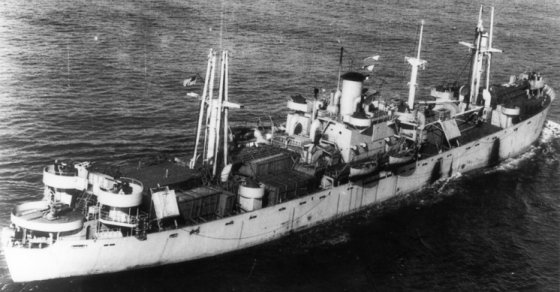
Paul Hamilton was one of many Liberty Ships supplying the United States Army via the southern trans-Atlantic route. This ship was destroyed by an aerial torpedo while carrying ammunition in Convoy UGS 38.

Allied war materials had been transported from North America to the British Isles in HX convoys since 1939 and in slower SC convoys since 1940. These convoys were escorted by the Royal Navy and Royal Canadian Navy. The United States Navy provided a few escorts to HX and SC convoys from September 1941 through April 1943. UG convoys were established as a second, more direct, supply route for Operation Torch the invasion of North Africa. The first convoy, UGF 1, was the invasion convoy sailing on 24 October 1942 and arriving on 8 November 1942. The F was for a convoy of faster ships. Thereafter, fast and slow eastbound and westbound convoys on this southern route were given four number sequences beginning with 2.

== Fast eastbound convoys (UGF) ==
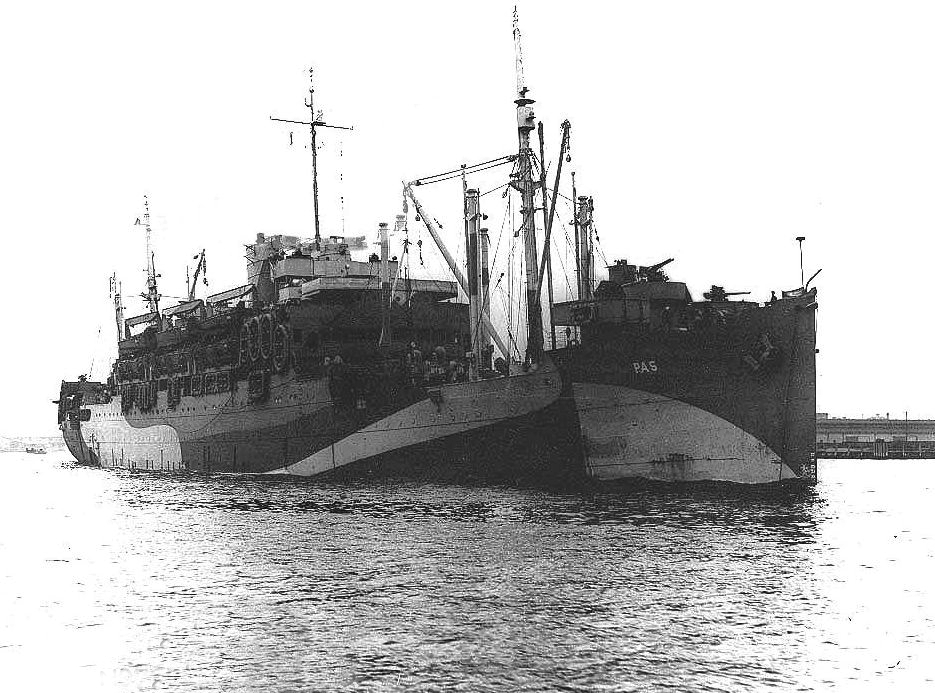
USS Barnett (APA-5) sailed in Convoy UGF 8A and was typical of the troopships in fast convoys.

Commencing with Convoy UGF 2, sailing from New York 6 November 1942, fast eastbound convoys sailed along the southern trans-Atlantic route at irregular intervals of about 25 days until June 1943. Convoys UGF 2 and UGF 3 terminated at Casablanca, and to the Mediterranean port of Oran with Convoy UGF 4. In preparation for the Allied invasion of Sicily, Convoys UGF 8 and UGF 9 sailed in two sections with the second section being called Convoy UGF 8A and Convoy UGF 9A, respectively. Sailing frequency to the Mediterranean was then reduced by preparations for Operation Overlord. Convoy UGF 10 was the last convoy terminating at Oran on 2 September 1943 and Convoy UGF 11 was the first to the southern European port of Naples on 31 May 1944. With Convoy UGF 12 sailing from Hampton Roads 1 July 1944, the interval was set at 27 days, at which it remained the rest of the war. This schedule called for two escort groups based at Norfolk and two convoy commodores. Convoys UGF 15B and UGF 17B terminated in Marseille. The last fast eastbound Convoy UGF 22 terminated in Oran on 8 April 1945. A total of 382 ships sailed in 26 fast convoys and none were lost.

== Slow eastbound convoys (UGS) ==
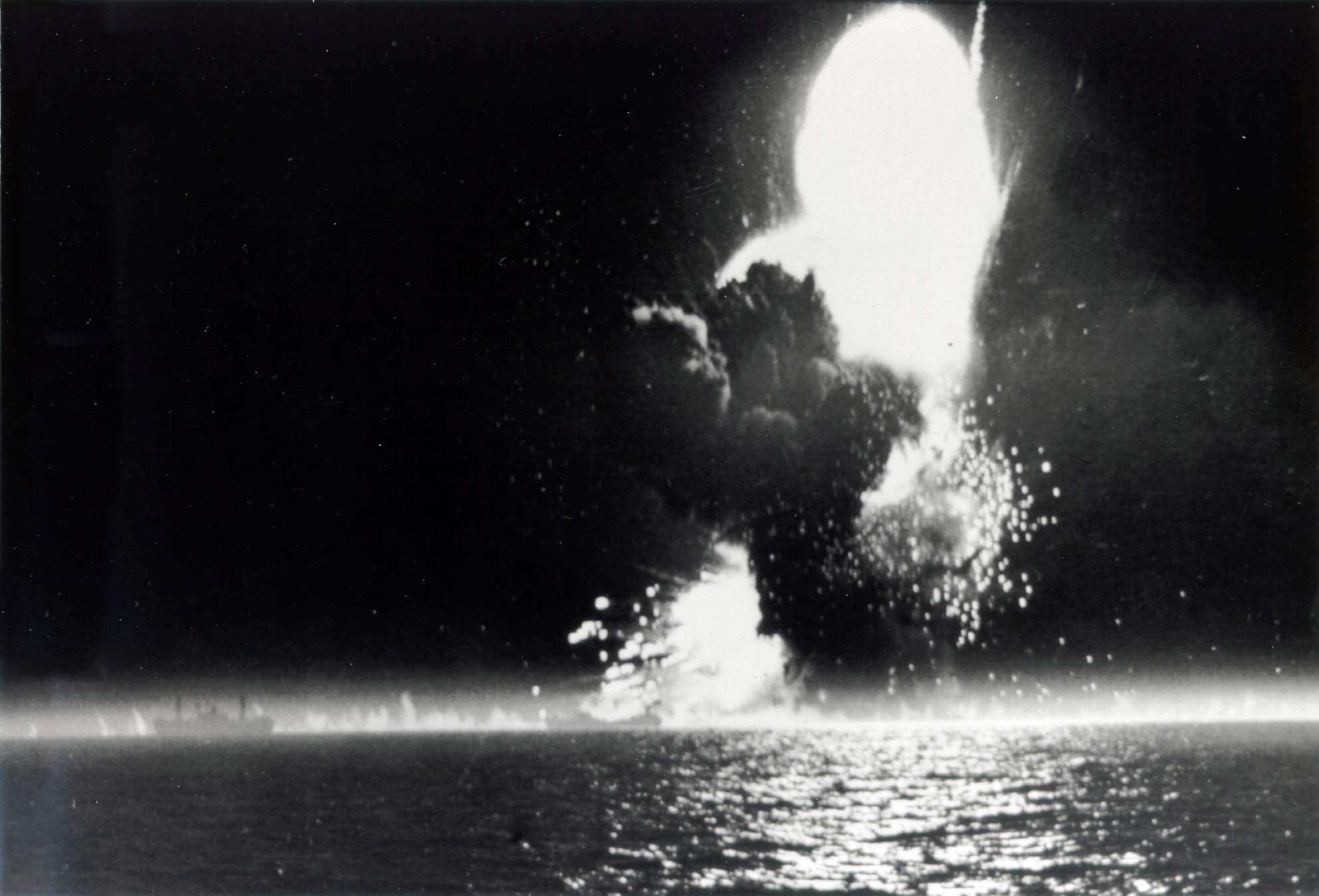
The explosion of SS Paul Hamilton on 20 April 1944.

Approximately two slow eastbound convoys per month departed Hampton Roads along the southern trans-Atlantic route beginning with Convoy UGS 2 on 13 November 1942. Frequency of sailing increased to three convoys per month in the summer of 1943 and increased again to six convoys per month in 1945. The last slow eastbound Convoy, UGS 95, left Hampton Roads on 28 May 1945. Approximately 5,800 ships sailed in 100 slow convoys. Additional sections were Convoy UGS 5A, Convoy UGS 6A, Convoy UGS 7A, Convoy UGS 8A, Convoy UGS 33A and Convoy UGS 55B.

Convoy UGS 6 came under attack by wolf packs Unverzagt, Wohlgemut, and Tummler during the submarine offensive including the battle of convoys HX 229/SC 122. Three ships were sunk:

- U-524 torpedoed the French freighter Wyoming on 15 March 1943.
- U-172 torpedoed the Liberty Ship Benjamin Harrison on 16 March 1943.
- U-167 and U-521 torpedoed the Liberty Ship Molly Pitcher on 17 March 1943.

These were the only ships lost during the Atlantic crossing of these convoys, although the following ships were lost in the Mediterranean Sea.

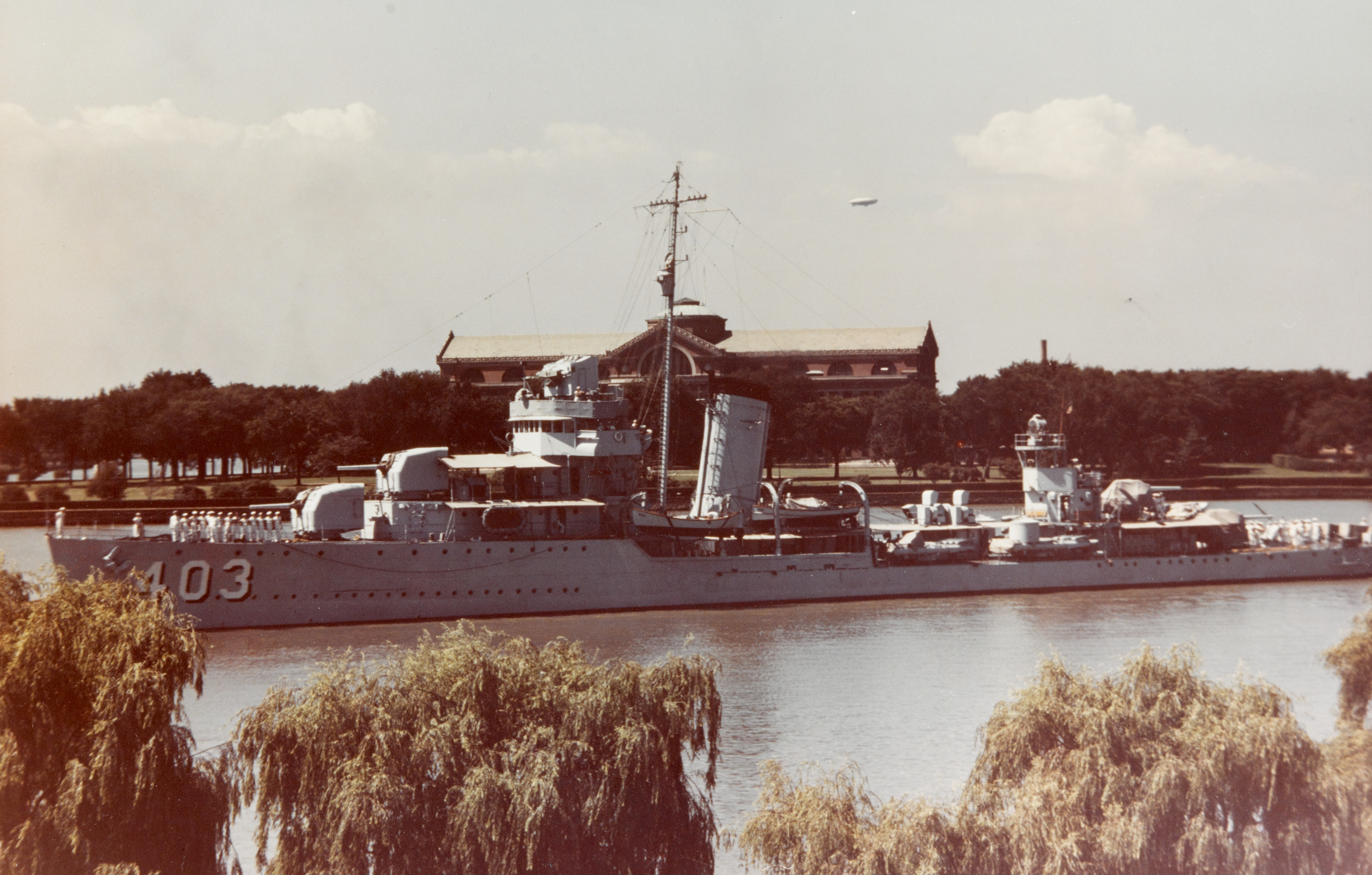
USS Trippe (DD-403) with sister ships USS Mayrant, USS Rhind and USS Rowan, Sims-class destroyer USS Wainwright and Benson-class destroyers USS Champlin and USS Hobby formed the anti-submarine screen for Convoy UGS 6.

- U-73 torpedoed Liberty Ship Arthur Middleton in Convoy UGS 3 on 1 January 1943.
- U-565 torpedoed the American freighter Michigan and the French troopship Sidi-bel-Abbes inConvoy UGS 7 on 20 April 1943.
- U-572 torpedoed the French tanker Lot in Convoy UGS 10 on 22 June 1943.
- British freighter Empire Kestrel in Convoy UGS 13 was sunk by aircraft on 16 August 1943.
- U-410 torpedoed Liberty Ships John Bell and Richard Henderson in Convoy UGS 14 on 26 August 1943.
- U-410 torpedoed Liberty Ship Christian Michelson in Convoy UGS 17 on 26 September 1943.
- British freighter Fort Fitzgerald in Convoy UGS 18 was sunk by aircraft on 4 October 1943.
- Liberty Ship Edward Bates in Convoy UGS 30 was sunk by aircraft on 1 February 1944.
- Liberty Ships SS Virginia Dare and SS Daniel Chester French were sunk when Convoy UGS 33 entered an Allied minefield on 6 March 1944.
- U-407 torpedoed Liberty Ships Meyer London and Thomas G. Masaryk in Convoy UGS 37 on 16 April 1944.
- Liberty Ship SS Paul Hamilton and British freighter Royal Star in Convoy UGS 38 were sunk by aircraft on 20 April 1944.
- U-300 torpedoed British tanker Regent Lion in Convoy UGS 72 on 17 February 1945.

== Fast westbound convoys (GUF) ==
A total of 335 ships returned to the United States along the southern trans-Atlantic route in 24 fast convoys beginning with the sailing of Convoy GUF 2 from Casablanca on 29 November 1942. The last fast westbound convoy GUF 22 left Oran on 16 April 1945. Additional sections were identified as Convoy GUF 2A, Convoy GUF 15B, and Convoy GUF 17B. No ships were lost from these fast convoys.

== Slow westbound convoys (GUS) ==
Approximately 5,200 ships returned to the United States along the southern trans-Atlantic route in 98 slow convoys beginning with the sailing of Convoy GUS 2 from Oran on 21 December 1942. The last slow westbound Convoy GUS 92 left Oran on 27 May 1945. Additional sections were Convoy GUS 5A, Convoy GUS 5B, Convoy GUS 6A, Convoy GUS 7A, Convoy GUS 8A, Convoy GUS 10X and Convoy GUS 55B. There were no losses from these convoys during the Atlantic portion of their voyage, but five ships were lost within the Mediterranean Sea.

- U-371 torpedoed the Liberty Ship James Russell Lowell in Convoy GUS 18 on 15 October 1943.
- British freighter Alpherat in Convoy GUS 25 was sunk by aircraft on 21 December 1943.
- U-969 torpedoed the Liberty Ships George Cleeve and Peter Skene Ogden in Convoy GUS 31 on 22 February 1944.
- U-870 torpedoed the Liberty Ship Henry Miller in Convoy GUS 63 on 3 January 1945.

== Escorts ==
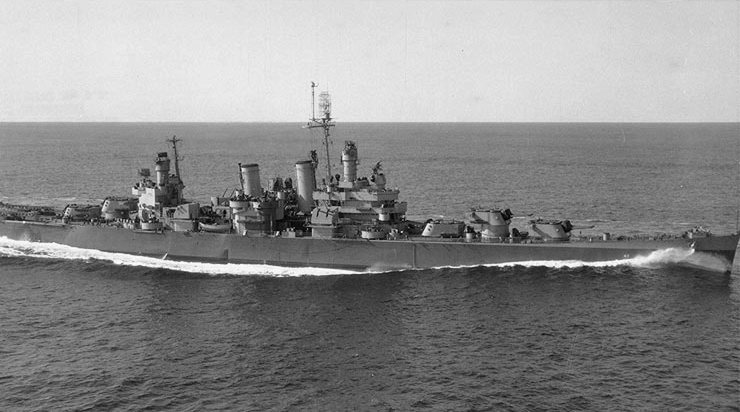
Fast troopship convoys were accompanied by cruisers or battleships to protect them from raiders. USS Savannah escorted Convoy UGF 8A. United States Navy terminology of the time identified this large warship as the "escort" and the smaller destroyers as the anti-submarine "screen."

The United States Navy provided all escorts between Hampton Roads and Gibraltar, although some of the destroyer escorts providing anti-submarine screens for these convoys had United States Coast Guard crews. A typical screen was provided by an escort division (CortDiv) of six destroyer escorts. Most of these convoys were given air coverage from escort carriers and patrol bombers flying from the Azores. The Royal Navy initially provided escorts within the Mediterranean, although United States escorted these convoys as far as Oran as the front moved east.
