= USS Rowan (DD-405) =

Benham-class destroyer

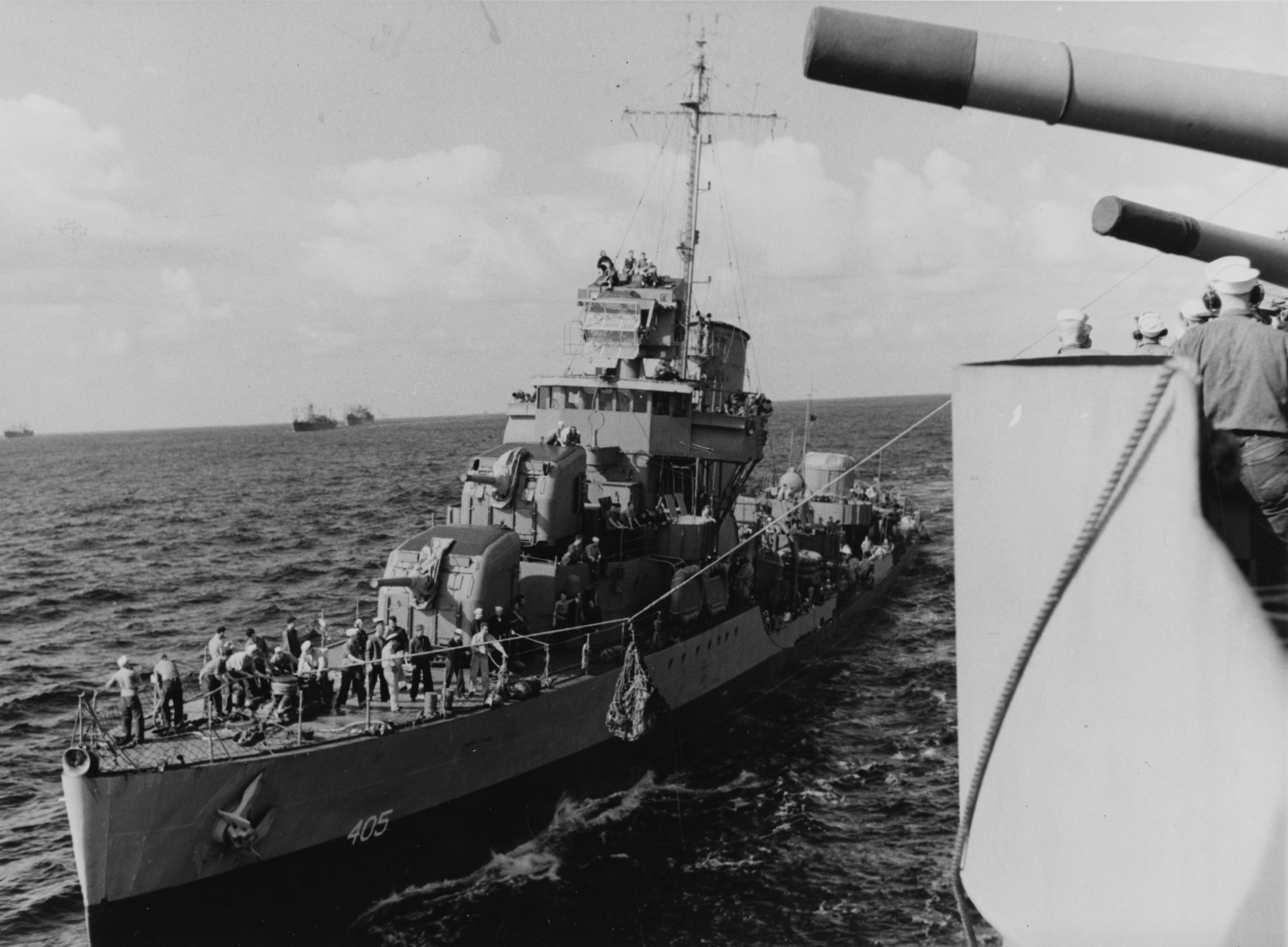
- The USS Rowan receiving provisions via "high-line" from USS Augusta (CA-31) while operating at sea, 4 December 1942.The USS Rowan receiving provisions via "high-line" from USS Augusta (CA-31) while operating at sea, 4 December 1942.

History

United States
- Namesake: Stephen C. Rowan
- Builder: Norfolk Navy Yard
- Laid down: 25 June 1937
- Launched: 5 May 1938
- Commissioned: 23 September 1939
- Fate: Torpedoed and sunk by a German E-boat, 11 September 1943

General characteristics
- Class & type: Benham-class destroyer
- Displacement: 1850 tons (full)
- Length: 340 ft 6 in
- Beam: 35 ft 5 in
- Draft: 17 ft 3 in
- Propulsion: 50,000 shp, Westinghouse Geared Turbines, 2 propellers
- Speed: 37 knots
- Complement: 175 officers and enlisted
- Armament: 4 × 5 in (130 mm)/38 guns; 16 × 21 inch (533 mm) torpedo tubes

The third USS Rowan (DD-405) was a Benham-class destroyer named for Stephen C. Rowan. Rowan was in the Atlantic when the United States entered World War II, and was one of the United States Navy ships joining the British Home Fleet for the battle of convoy PQ 17. Rowan later engaged French warships in the Naval Battle of Casablanca while supporting Operation Torch. Rowan then defended convoy UGS 6 before supporting the invasion of Sicily. Rowan was sunk by E-boats off Salerno during the allied invasion of Italy.

== History ==
Rowan was laid down on 25 June 1937 by the Norfolk Navy Yard, Portsmouth, Virginia; launched 5 May 1938; sponsored by Miss Elizabeth H. Rowan, great-granddaughter of Vice Admiral Rowan; and commissioned 23 September 1939.

After shakedown in the Caribbean, Rowan departed Norfolk on 17 May 1940 for duty in the Pacific, based at San Diego, California. During the spring of 1941, however, U.S. involvement in the war in Europe increased. In May the limits of the Neutrality Patrol were extended and the Navy gradually expanded its responsibilities for protecting transatlantic convoys.

At the end of the month, Rowan was transferred to the Atlantic and assigned to the Neutrality Patrol. Through the spring and summer, she ranged from Newfoundland to the Caribbean. Then, in early November, she was ordered to escort Convoy WS-12X, carrying British reinforcements for the Near and Far East, from Halifax, Nova Scotia to Cape Town.

Sailing from Halifax on 10 November, she reached Cape Town on 9 December, 2 days after the United States entered World War II. In January 1942, she returned to the east coast of the United States and resumed convoy duty in the North Atlantic and the Caribbean. On 30 April she sailed east from Halifax to escort another convoy to the mid-ocean rendezvous point. Upon departing the convoy on 10 May, she proceeded to Hvalfjorður, Iceland, and on the 11th joined TF 99, which was acting as a part of the British Home Fleet based at Hvalfjordur and Scapa Flow.

At mid-month, she completed a "north about circuit" to Seyðisfjörður, whence she patrolled, with TF 99, 150 miles east of the routes of convoys PQ-16 and QP-12 to intercept any German units which might sortie from Norway to destroy the convoys. The first convoy was bound for the north of Russia, the second on return from there.

On the 29th, TF 99 put into Scapa Flow and on 12 June got underway to return to Iceland and repeat its previous mission for convoys PQ 17 and QP-13. The latter had lost four merchantmen on its northward run and would lose, on its return, five more before reaching Reykjavík. Berlin had ordered the former, comprising 33 merchantmen, annihilated by a combined air-surface-submarine operation, "Rösselsprung".

PQ 17 departed Iceland on 27 June. Two days later the cruiser covering force, to which Rowan was attached, moved around to Seyðisfjörður, whence they sortied on 1 July. On 2 July, Rowan was detached and assigned to PQ 17. That convoy, shadowed by German reconnaissance planes despite heavy fog, had already lost two freighters; one grounded, the other damaged by ice and ordered back.

As Rowan approached the convoy, the Luftwaffe moved in. Rowan, along with HMS Fury and the rescue ship Zafaraan, claimed credit for shooting down one of the attackers. No ships were lost. On the 3rd, the weather protected the convoy from a bomber attack. Early on the 4th, however, the enemy planes began to penetrate through the fog. A Liberty ship went down shortly after 0300. The raids continued. By late afternoon four more ships had been hit, two of which sank.

Shortly thereafter, the convoy was ordered scattered and the escorts sent to support the cruisers in an anticipated engagement with German heavy units which were rumored to have left the fjords of Norway. The merchantmen of PQ 17 steamed north, independently. Eleven ships got through to Russia.

Rowan, ordered to rejoin the cruisers on the 4th, returned to Iceland with that force on the 7th. On the 13th, her division DesDiv 16, was relieved and on the 14th she headed back to the United States. Overhaul at Boston, Massachusetts followed and in mid-August she resumed convoy escort duty with a run to Panama. In September, she trained and conducted patrols out of Norfolk, Virginia, and Portland, Maine; then, in October joined TF 34 for Operation Torch, the invasion of North Africa.

On 7 November, she arrived off Fedhala with the assault force. Through the 9th she screened the transports. On the 10th, she patrolled off Casablanca and participated in action against Vichy ships attempting to turn back the invasion. On the 11th, she resumed screening in the transport area, and on the 12th she got underway to return to the United States.

Between December 1942 and April 1943, Rowan escorted two reinforcement and resupply convoys to Casablanca. On the second trip out, UGS-6, five merchantmen were lost to a "wolfpack" in 4 days, 13 to 17 March. On 16 March she scuttled the Benjamin Harrison at 21:30, with gunfire. In May the destroyer completed her last transatlantic run. At the end of the month she joined TF 80 at Mers-el-Kebir, Algeria, and for the next month conducted ASW patrols and escorted convoys along the North African coast.

On 10 July, the invasion of Sicily began. On the 14th Rowan arrived off the coast in the screen of a reinforcement convoy and commenced patrols off Gela. After the 20th, she shifted around to the northern shore and assumed patrol and escort work in the Palermo area. On the 26th she added shore bombardment, against enemy positions between Cefalù and Stefano di Camastra, and into August she supported the "leap frog" landings along the coast. She then returned to North Africa to prepare for the landings on the Italian mainland at Salerno.

== Fate ==
On 9 September, Rowan entered the Gulf of Salerno in the screen of the Southern Attack Force. That day and the next as the assault force and supplies were landed at Paestum, she screened the transports and freighters. Late on the night of the 10th, she headed back to Oran with the emptied ships. Shortly after midnight, the convoy was approached by four S-boats of the Kriegsmarine's 3rd and 7th Schnellboot Flotillas which had sortied from their base at Civitavecchia; the 'type 30' boat S 57, and the smaller 'type 151' boats S 151, S 153, and S 154.

Upon detecting an enemy contact, Rowan pursued and fired, then, as her quarry pulled away, ceased firing and changed course to rejoin the convoy. Within 5 minutes a new contact was made, range less than 3,000 yards. Again she changed course, to avoid torpedoes and bring her guns into position. As the range decreased to 2,000 yards, Rowan was hit by a torpedo launched from one of the S-boats. She exploded and sank in less than a minute, taking 202 of her 273 officers and men with her. Those whose bodies were not recovered, were listed as ‘missing in action’ for a year and a day after the sinking. They were considered officially ‘dead’ on 12 September 1944.

== Honors ==
Rowan earned five battle stars during World War II.
