= SS City of Cairo =

British passenger steamship sunk during World War II

Coordinates: 23°30′S 5°30′W

- SS City of Cairo in wartime livery

History

United Kingdom
- Name: City of Cairo
- Operator: Ellerman Lines Ltd, London
- Port of registry: (United Kingdom) Liverpool
- Builder: Earle’s Shipbuilding & Engineering Co. Ltd, Hull
- Launched: 21 October 1914
- Completed: January 1915
- Identification: UK official number 137423
- Fate: Sunk on 6 November 1942

General characteristics
- Class & type: Steam passenger ship
- Tonnage: 8,034 GRT; tonnage under deck 6263; 5,088 NRT
- Length: 449.9 ft (137.1 m)
- Beam: 55.7 ft (17.0 m)
- Draught: 33 ft 11 in (10.34 m)
- Depth: 31.3 ft (9.5 m)
- Decks: 2
- Installed power: 774 NHP
- Propulsion: Quadruple-expansion steam engine
- Speed: 12 knots (22 km/h; 14 mph)
- Capacity: 7,422 tons general cargo; 311 passengers and crew

SS City of Cairo was a British passenger steamship. She was sunk in the Second World War with heavy loss of life, most after the sinking, but before being rescued.

It was built by Earle's Shipbuilding & Engineering Co. Ltd, Hull in 1915 for Ellerman Lines Ltd of London. It was 449.9 ft (137.1 m) long, had two decks, two masts and 8,034 gross register tons (GRT). She was registered in Liverpool.

On 29 January 1929, City of Cairo′s propeller struck the British tug Speedy at Liverpool, then Speedy sank.

== Final voyage ==
City of Cairo was requisitioned during the Second World War to bring supplies to the United Kingdom. Her last voyage, under the command of her master, William A. Rogerson, was to take her from Bombay, which she departed on 1 October 1942 for the United Kingdom, via Durban, Cape Town, and Pernambuco, Brazil.

The ship departed Cape Town at 0600 hours on the morning of 1 November, carrying 101 passengers, including 29 women and 18 children. Also on board were 10 DEMS Gunners from the Army and Royal Navy. Among the total complement were two spare Lascar crews recruited in India for service on British ships. She was carrying 7,422 tons of general cargo, including pig iron, timber, wool, cotton, manganese ore and 2,000 boxes of silver coins.

The ship sailed north for 800 miles (1,300 km), zigzagging during the day and keeping about 45 miles (72 km) off the African coast, before turning westwards across the South Atlantic towards Brazil and her next port of call. She was unescorted and capable of only 12 knots (22 km/h). Its problems were exacerbated by the excessive smokiness of her engines which increased her visibility.

== Torpedoed ==
On 6 November, the smoke trail was sighted by the German submarine U-68 under the command of Karl-Friedrich Merten. At 2136 hours, U-68 fired a torpedo at the lone merchant ship. The torpedo struck City of Cairo abreast of the after-mast. The master gave the order to abandon ship. Only six people, two male crewmen and four male passengers, were lost in the evacuation. Several women and children were struggling in the water, but they were later rescued by other boats. The ship, still underway, had stabilised, but she was slowly settling by the stern. A distress call was sent, which was acknowledged by the U-68, which provided the callsign of the Walvis Bay station in South Africa.

Merten fired a second torpedo 20 minutes after the first, which smashed one of the lifeboats, overturned another, and caused the ship to sink by the stern about 480 miles (770 km) south of St Helena. One of the two crewmen lost in the sinking, Chief Radio Officer Harry Peever, was killed by this strike. He had remained in the wireless room to send distress signals. Once City of Cairo had sunk, U-68 surfaced alongside the six lifeboats that had been launched. Merten spoke to the occupants of No. 6 boat, asked the ship's name, cargo and whether it was carrying prisoners of war. He then gave a course for the nearest land, which by now was either the Brazilian coast, approximately 2,000 miles (3,200 km) away, Africa was 1,000 miles (1,600 km) and St Helena was 500 miles (800 km) distant. Merten then left them, with the words "Goodnight, and sorry for sinking you". He privately thought that they had little chance of survival.

== Journey ==
There were 296 survivors: 54 in Lifeboat 1, 56 in Lifeboat 5, 57 in Lifeboat 6, 57 in Lifeboat 7, respectively, whilst the smaller Lifeboat 4 held 17 people. After assessing the situation, it was decided to attempt to reach the nearest land, St Helena, despite the danger of overshooting the small island and becoming lost. Each boat had a compass, but there was only one sextant which had been recovered from his belongings as the ship went down by second officer Les Boundy. These, along with Master William Rogerson's Rolex watch, would be needed for navigation, and this would require the boats to remain together. The survivors hoped to reach St Helena within two or three weeks, and water was rationed at 110 ml a day per person, despite the tropical heat.

Over the next three weeks, most of the boats lost contact with each other, and numerous occupants died. Rogerson had hoped to prevent the dispersal of the boats for as long as possible, but as the situation worsened, he was compelled to allow one of the faster boats, which was short of supplies and taking on water, to press on ahead. The boats also suffered damage, with rudders or masts being broken, causing some to lag behind. Eventually, most of the boats had lost sight of each other and proceeding alone.

== Rescue ==
Lifeboat 6 was rescued on 19 November by the Clan Alpine, en route to St Helena. 48 of 57 occupants had survived (all 9 who died were Lascars). George Nutter informed the captain that there were other boats further ahead of his. The Clan Alpine then rescued the survivors from Boat 7 (55 of 57 occupants survived — 2 Lascars had died at sea) and then Boat 5 (47 of 56 occupants had survived — 2 Europeans and 7 Lascars had died at sea). The survivors reported that there were three other boats at sea, but by now were unsure where they were. After fruitless searching, the Clan Alpine landed the survivors at St Helena, though more would die after being transferred to the hospital. On the evening of 19 November, Boat 8, with 48 survivors out of 55 occupants (1 European and 7 Lascars died at sea) was rescued by the SS Bendoran, and taken to Cape Town. These four boats had been at sea for 13 days before being rescued. Of those picked up, one man later died aboard the Bendoran, two aboard the Clan Alpine, and another four died in hospital in St Helena.

Another three survivors — Angus MacDonald, John Edmead, and Diana Jarman — were picked up by the German merchant ship and blockade runner Rhakotis, which was travelling from Japan to Bordeaux, on 12 December 1942. They had spent 36 days at sea. One of the survivors — Diana Jarman — then died aboard the Rhakotis. The Rhakotis was intercepted by the cruiser HMS Scylla, torpedoed and sunk off Cape Finisterre on 1 January 1943. The two remaining survivors from City of Cairo managed to make it to different lifeboats and survive their second sinking. One was picked up the next day by U-410 and landed at Saint-Nazaire three days later. The submarine was almost destroyed en route, when she was detected and attacked by British bombers. The other survivor's lifeboat eventually landed in Spain.

Boat 4, with 17 people on board, having not sighted St Helena by 23 November, decided that they must have overshot it. Several of the occupants were already dead, and rather than trying to search the area for the island, decided to head west for the coast of South America 1,500 miles (2,400 km) to the west. On 27 December, after a voyage of 51 days, only the third officer and a female passenger were still alive when their boat was spotted by the Brazilian Navy minelayer Caravelas. They had got within 80 miles (130 km) of the Brazilian coast and were landed at Recife. The third officer, James Whyte, was awarded the MBE. He was repatriated on the City of Pretoria, but was killed when the ship was torpedoed and sunk by U-172 on 4 March 1943. The female survivor, Margaret Gordon (Ingham), was awarded the BEM, but refused to cross the Atlantic until the war was over.

Out of a total of 302 people aboard City of Cairo, 107 died, with 195 surviving. Six are known to have died in the sinking, 94 in the boats, and seven after being rescued. Some of the names of those lost are inscribed on the Tower Hill Memorial.

== Rediscovery ==
In April 2015, it was announced that the wreck had been rediscovered in 2011 at a depth of approximately 17,000 feet (5,150 metres), and that £34 million of silver, a "large percentage" of the total, had been salvaged by September 2013. The money generated from this recovery is still undergoing a legal dispute as to the true ownership. This is the current record for the deepest marine salvage operation.
