= Capo Cefalù Lighthouse =

Lighthouse in Sicily, Italy

Capo Cefalù
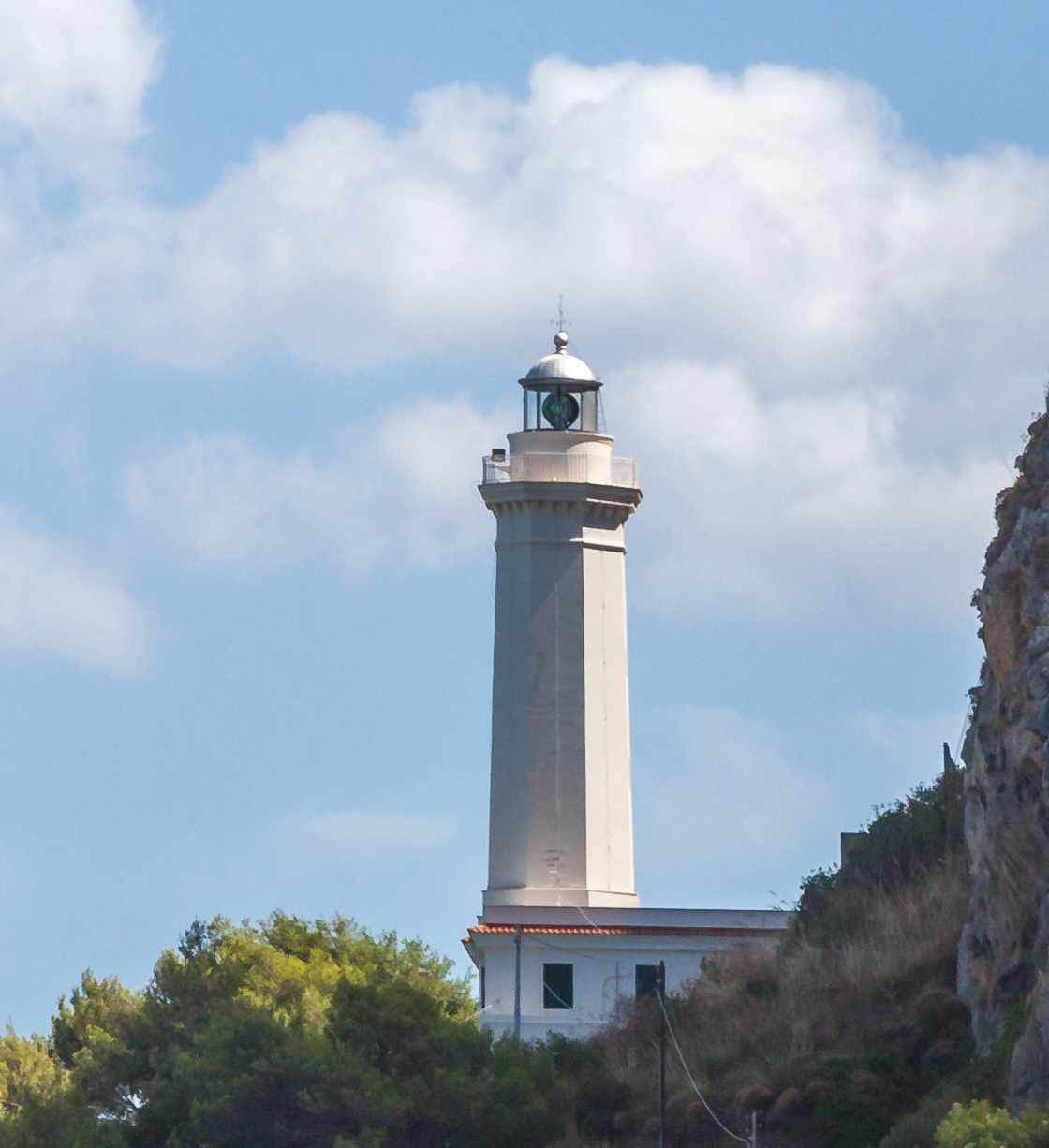
- Capo Cefalù Lighthouse
- Location: Cefalù; Sicily; Italy
- Coordinates: 38°02′23″N 14°01′46″E

Tower
- Constructed: 1900
- Foundation: masonry base
- Construction: masonry tower
- Height: 26 metres (85 ft)
- Shape: octagonal tower with balcony and lantern atop a 2-storey keeper's house
- Markings: unpainted tower, white lantern, grey metallic lantern dome
- Power source: mains electricity
- Operator: Marina Militare
- Fog signal: no

Light
- Focal height: 80 metres (260 ft)
- Lens: Type OR 350; Focal length: 177.5 mm
- Intensity: main: AL 1000 W reserve: LABI 100 W 10.3 v
- Range: mains: 25 nautical miles (46 km; 29 mi) reserve: 18 nautical miles (33 km; 21 mi)
- Characteristic: Fl W 5s.
- Italy no.: 3261 E.F.

Capo Cefalù Lighthouse (Italian: Faro di Capo Cefalù) is an active lighthouse located on the promontory of Capo Cefalù under the steep limestone ridge, 280 metres (920 ft) high, named Rocca east of Cefalù, Sicily on the Tyrrhenian Sea.

== Description ==
The lighthouse, built in 1900 and electrified in 1930, consists of an octagonal tower, 26 feet (7.9 m) high, with balcony and lantern mounted on a 2-storey keeper's house. The tower is unpainted and the lantern is in white; the lantern dome in grey metallic. The lantern is positioned at 80 metres (260 ft) above sea level and emits one white flash in a 5 seconds period visible up to a distance of 25 nautical miles (46 km; 29 mi). The lighthouse is completely automated and managed by the Marina Militare with the identification code number 3261 E.F.

== See also ==
- List of lighthouses in Italy
- Cefalù
