= SS City of Pretoria =

Ships built on the River Mersey

Coordinates: 41°45′N 42°30′W

History

United Kingdom
- Name: SS City of Pretoria
- Operator: Ellerman & Bucknall Steamship Co. Ltd, London
- Port of registry: (United Kingdom) London
- Builder: Cammell Laird & Co Ltd, Birkenhead
- Launched: 21 September 1937
- Completed: December 1937
- Identification: UK official number 165620
- Fate: Sunk 4 March 1943

General characteristics
- Class & type: cargo steamship
- Tonnage: 8,049 GRT; tonnage under deck7229; 3,977 NRT
- Length: 496.7 ft (151.4 m)
- Beam: 62.4 ft (19.0 m)
- Draught: 35 ft 0 in (10.67 m)
- Depth: 31.3 ft (9.5 m)
- Installed power: 1,867 NHP
- Propulsion: 6 steam turbines, single-reduction geared onto two propeller shafts

SS City of Pretoria was a British cargo steamship. She was torpedoed and sunk in the Second World War with heavy loss of life.

== Career ==
She was built by Cammell Laird & Co Ltd, at their yards in Birkenhead in 1937. She was operated by Ellerman & Bucknall Steamship Co. Ltd and registered in London. She continued to be operated by Ellerman Lines in the Second World War, making at least one voyage early in the war carrying materiel from New York to France.

Captain Alfred George Freeman, who went on to captain other Ellerman Lines ships including the SS City of Singapore and a newer SS City of Pretoria from 29 November 1950 to 26 November 1960, was her Chief Officer from 6 August 1939 to 16 August 1939.

Her final voyage took her from New York, which she departed on 27 February 1943, bound for Liverpool via Holyhead. She was carrying 7,032 tons of general cargo and 145 passengers and crew. Her master was Frank Deighton. Her high speed meant that it was deemed an acceptable risk to sail unescorted rather than in a convoy.

== Sinking ==
She was travelling unescorted through the Atlantic Ocean, when she was sighted on 4 March at 0609 hours by the German submarine U-172. The U-boat torpedoed the City of Pretoria, causing her to explode and sink northwest of the Azores. All aboard her, including her master, 108 crew, 24 DEMS gunners, five apprentices and seven passengers were lost with her. The passengers were "Distressed British Seamen" (DBS) being repatriated to the UK because their former ships had been sunk.

One of the passengers was James Allistair Whyte, previously third officer of City of Cairo, who had survived 51 days in a lifeboat after she had been torpedoed and sunk by U-68 on 6 November 1942.
