= SS Benjamin Harrison =

Liberty ship of WWII

History

United States
- Name: Benjamin Harrison
- Namesake: Benjamin Harrison
- Owner: War Shipping Administration (WSA)
- Operator: Calmar Steamship Corporation
- Ordered: as type (EC2-S-C1) hull, MCE hull 25
- Awarded: 14 March 1941
- Builder: Bethlehem-Fairfield Shipyard, Baltimore, Maryland
- Cost: $1,277,991
- Yard number: 2012
- Way number: 1
- Laid down: 27 September 1941
- Launched: 24 January 1942
- Completed: 13 March 1942
- Fate: Torpedoed on 16 March 1943 and scuttled

General characteristics
- Class & type: Liberty ship; type EC2-S-C1, standard
- Tonnage: 10,865 LT DWT; 7,176 GRT
- Displacement: 3,380 long tons (3,434 t) (light); 14,245 long tons (14,474 t) (max)
- Length: 441 feet 6 inches (135 m) oa; 416 feet (127 m) pp; 427 feet (130 m) lwl
- Beam: 57 feet (17 m)
- Draft: 27 ft 9.25 in (8.4646 m)
- Installed power: 2 × Oil fired 450 °F (232 °C) boilers, operating at 220 psi (1,500 kPa); 2,500 hp (1,900 kW)
- Propulsion: 1 × triple-expansion steam engine, (manufactured by General Machinery Corp., Hamilton, Ohio); 1 × screw propeller
- Speed: 11.5 knots (21.3 km/h; 13.2 mph)
- Capacity: 562,608 cubic feet (15,931 m^{3}) (grain); 499,573 cubic feet (14,146 m^{3}) (bale)
- Complement: 38–62 USMM; 21–40 USNAG
- Armament: Varied by ship; Bow-mounted 3-inch (76 mm)/50-caliber gun; Stern-mounted 4-inch (102 mm)/50-caliber gun; 2–8 × single 20-millimeter (0.79 in) Oerlikon anti-aircraft (AA) cannons and/or, 2–8 × 37-millimeter (1.46 in) M1 AA guns

SS Benjamin Harrison was a Liberty ship built in the United States during World War II. She was named after Benjamin Harrison, an American planter and merchant, a revolutionary leader, and a Founding Father of the United States. She served a year from March 1942 to March 1943, when she was attacked and scuttled.

== Construction ==
Benjamin Harrison was laid down on 27 September 1941, under a Maritime Commission (MARCOM) contract, MCE hull 26, by the Bethlehem-Fairfield Shipyard, Baltimore, Maryland; and was launched on 24 January 1942.

== History ==
She was allocated to Calmar Steamship Corporation, on 13 March 1942.

=== Sinking ===
She was loaded with stores for Allied forces in North Africa and sailed from Hampton Roads on 4 March 1943, with Convoy UGS 6. At 20:51, on 16 March 1943, she was struck by two torpedoes fired by the German submarine U-172, part of Wolfpack Unverzagt, during the only successful wolfpack attack on the trans-Atlantic UG convoy. Benjamin Harrison was struck in the #5 hold on the starboard side and began to slowly settle, but did not sink quickly. As the crew began to abandon ship, confusion caused two of the lifeboats to be improperly launched, allowing the occupants to be dropped into the ocean. Only one lifeboat was launched successfully, due to the last boat being damaged in the torpedo attack. Two officers and a member of the Armed Guard died. The escort ship USS Rowan scuttled Benjamin Harrison at 21:30, with gunfire, 150 mi (240 km) east northeast of Terceira, Azores, near 39°09′N 24°15′W.

== Bibliography ==
- "Bethlehem-Fairfield, Baltimore MD". www.ShipbuildingHistory.com. 14 August 2008.
- Maritime Administration. "Benjamin Harrison". Ship History Database Vessel Status Card. U.S. Department of Transportation, Maritime Administration.
- Davies, James (May 2004). "Specifications (As-Built)" (PDF). p. 23.
- "SS Benjamin Harrison".
- "Benjamin Harrison".
