= SS Daniel Chester French =

Liberty ship of WWII

History

United States
- Name: Daniel Chester French
- Namesake: Daniel Chester French
- Owner: War Shipping Administration (WSA)
- Operator: Stockard Steamship Corp.
- Ordered: as type (EC2-S-C1) hull, MCE hull 924
- Awarded: 30 January 1942
- Builder: Bethlehem-Fairfield Shipyard, Baltimore, Maryland
- Cost: $1,061,765
- Yard number: 2074
- Way number: 14
- Laid down: 12 October 1942
- Launched: 12 November 1942
- Sponsored by: Mrs. Conrad Fretzer
- Completed: 30 November 1942
- Identification: Call sign: KHQA
- Fate: Struck a mines and sunk off Bizerta, Tunisia, 6 March 1944

General characteristics
- Class & type: Liberty ship; type EC2-S-C1, standard
- Tonnage: 10,865 LT DWT; 7,176 GRT
- Displacement: 3,380 long tons (3,434 t) (light); 14,245 long tons (14,474 t) (max)
- Length: 441 feet 6 inches (135 m) oa; 416 feet (127 m) pp; 427 feet (130 m) lwl
- Beam: 57 feet (17 m)
- Draft: 27 ft 9.25 in (8.4646 m)
- Installed power: 2 × Oil fired 450 °F (232 °C) boilers, operating at 220 psi (1,500 kPa); 2,500 hp (1,900 kW)
- Propulsion: 1 × triple-expansion steam engine, (manufactured by Ellicott Machine Corp., Baltimore, Maryland); 1 × screw propeller
- Speed: 11.5 knots (21.3 km/h; 13.2 mph)
- Capacity: 562,608 cubic feet (15,931 m^{3}) (grain); 499,573 cubic feet (14,146 m^{3}) (bale)
- Complement: 38–62 USMM; 21–40 USNAG
- Armament: Varied by ship; Bow-mounted 3-inch (76 mm)/50-caliber gun; Stern-mounted 4-inch (102 mm)/50-caliber gun; 2–8 × single 20-millimeter (0.79 in) Oerlikon anti-aircraft (AA) cannons and/or, 2–8 × 37-millimeter (1.46 in) M1 AA guns

SS Daniel Chester French was a Liberty ship built in the United States during World War II. She was named after Daniel Chester French, an American sculptor in the late 19th and early 20th centuries, from New Hampshire.

== Construction ==
Daniel Chester French was laid down on 12 October 1942, under a Maritime Commission (MARCOM) contract, MCE hull 924, by the Bethlehem-Fairfield Shipyard, Baltimore, Maryland; she was sponsored by Mrs. Conrad Fretzer, and was launched on 12 November 1942.

== History ==
She was allocated to Stockard Steamship Corp., on 30 November 1942.

On 6 March 1944, while traveling in a Convoy UGS 33 to Bandar Shapur from Philadelphia, she struck two mines at her forward holds on the starboard side. She was struck at 0820, ordered to abandon at 0835, and sunk at 0900. Daniel Chester French had been carrying general cargo, munitions, and 86 troops at the time, in addition to her ship crew of eight officers, one radioman, and thirty-five unlicensed sailors, and her gun crew of one officer and twenty-seven enlisted seamen. Thirty-seven men, thirteen of the ships crew, and 24 troops, were drowned.

Wreck location: 37°18′N 10°22′E

== Bibliography ==
- "Bethlehem-Fairfield, Baltimore MD". www.ShipbuildingHistory.com. 7 August 2021.
- Maritime Administration. "Daniel Chester French". Ship History Database Vessel Status Card. U.S. Department of Transportation, Maritime Administration.
- Davies, James (May 2004). "Specifications (As-Built)" (PDF). p. 23.
- "SS Daniel Chester French".
