= Gibilmanna =

Coordinates: 37.9871°N 14.0186°E

- Frazione
- Location of Gibilmanna in Italy
- Country: Italy
- Region: Sicily
- Province: Palermo (PA)
- Comune: Cefalù
- Elevation: 795 m (2,608 ft)

Population (2016)
  - Total: 11
- Time zone: UTC+1 (CET)
  - Summer (DST): UTC+2 (CEST)
- Postal code: 90015
- Dialing code: (+39) 0921
- Patron saint: Maria Santissima di Gibilmanna

Gibilmanna is a village in the Province of Palermo, Sicily, Southern Italy. It has a recorded population of just 11 people. The Sanctuary of Gibilmanna is located in the village.

== Climate ==
Gibilmanna has an unusual variety, dry, hot summer Mediterranean climate. In summer there is little rainfall, whereas during the winter there is significant precipitation. Gibilmanna is at an altitude of 880 m and therefore the winters are cold for Sicily. The coldest temperature since 2010 has been -4.1 °C (24.6 °F) recorded on 18 January 2016. Despite the altitude, at most times of the year there is very little wind, the wind averages calm 46% of the time.

On 16 June 2016, Gibilmanna recorded the hottest ever temperature for Italy, 47.7 °C (117.9 °F). This temperature is very close to the hottest recorded Europe temperature of 48.0 °C (118.4 °F) in Athens, Greece on 10 July 1977. The heatwave in Gibilmanna was due to unusual gale force south-westerly winds, bringing hot air from Northern Africa, and the humidity did not drop below 23%. The event was even more exceptional as the 14:00 temperature was 42.2 °C (108.0 °F) on the day of the heatwave, but only 19.6 °C (67.3 °F) at the same time the next day. The heatwave means that the temperature amplitude of 2016 is already in excess of 50 °C (90 °F).

Climate data for Gibilmanna, Italy (extremes 2010-)
Month	Jan	Feb	Mar	Apr	May	Jun	Jul	Aug	Sep	Oct	Nov	Dec	Year
Record high °C (°F)	16.7 (62.1)	23.9 (75.0)	22.9 (73.2)	25.5 (77.9)	31.0 (87.8)	47.7 (117.9)	36.8 (98.2)	36.9 (98.4)	33.1 (91.6)	28.9 (84.0)	20.7 (69.3)	14.7 (58.5)	47.7 (117.9)
Mean daily maximum °C (°F)	7.7 (45.9)	8.3 (46.9)	10.0 (50.0)	13.0 (55.4)	18.3 (64.9)	23.2 (73.8)	26.4 (79.5)	26.5 (79.7)	22.5 (72.5)	17.2 (63.0)	12.9 (55.2)	9.2 (48.6)	16.3 (61.3)
Daily mean °C (°F)	5.6 (42.1)	5.8 (42.4)	7.2 (45.0)	9.9 (49.8)	14.5 (58.1)	19.1 (66.4)	22.1 (71.8)	22.3 (72.1)	18.9 (66.0)	14.3 (57.7)	10.4 (50.7)	7.2 (45.0)	13.1 (55.6)
Mean daily minimum °C (°F)	3.5 (38.3)	3.3 (37.9)	4.5 (40.1)	6.8 (44.2)	10.8 (51.4)	15.0 (59.0)	17.8 (64.0)	18.2 (64.8)	15.4 (59.7)	11.5 (52.7)	7.9 (46.2)	5.2 (41.4)	10.0 (50.0)
Record low °C (°F)	−4.1 (24.6)	−3.1 (26.4)	−3.9 (25.0)	−1.6 (29.1)	3.6 (38.5)	7.5 (45.5)	11.8 (53.2)	13.0 (55.4)	9.2 (48.6)	4.5 (40.1)	−1.1 (30.0)	−2.3 (27.9)	−4.1 (24.6)
Average rainfall mm (inches)	66 (2.6)	54 (2.1)	49 (1.9)	40 (1.6)	27 (1.1)	11 (0.4)	10 (0.4)	18 (0.7)	40 (1.6)	75 (3.0)	70 (2.8)	69 (2.7)	529 (20.9)
Source 1: Weather archive in Gibilmanna
Source 2: Climate: Gibilmanna
