= Sanctuary of Gibilmanna =

Church building in Cefalù, Italy

Coordinates: 37.9871°N 14.0186°E

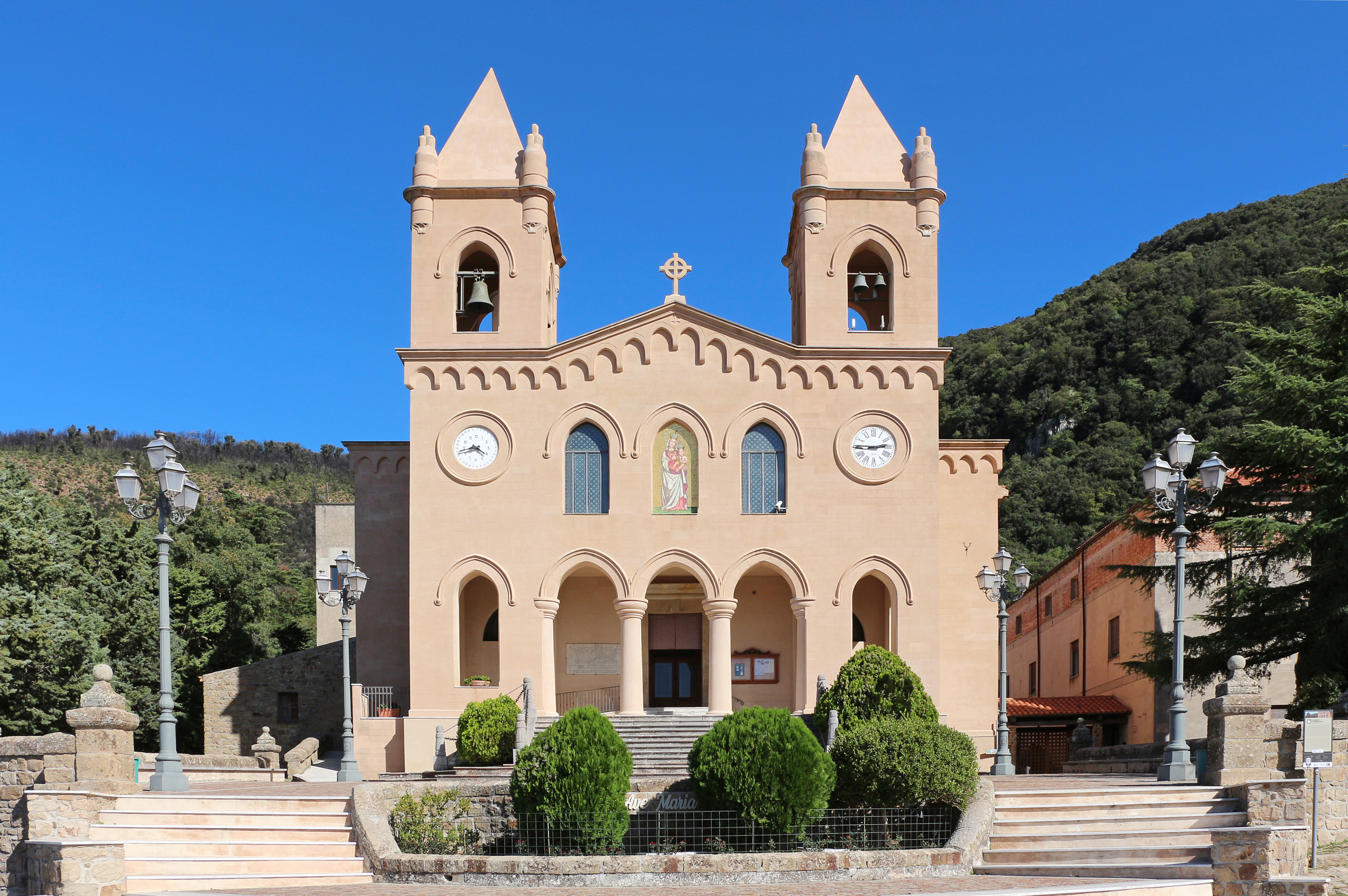
The Sanctuary of Gibilmanna.

The Sanctuary of Gibilmanna is a Christian shrine in the province of Palermo, Sicily, southern Italy. It is located in Gibilmanna, a frazione of the comune of Cefalù on a slope of the Pizzo Sant'Angelo, a peak in the Madonie chain, at an altitude of some 800 m.

== History ==
According to tradition, Gibilmanna would be one of the six Benedictine monasteries commissioned by Gregory the Great (pope from 590) at his own expenses before his election. On the site existed a church dedicated to St Michael Archangel.

The convent's edifices were perhaps in ruins in the 9th century, when the Arabs conquered the area (858), while the small church would house several hermitages. After the Norman conquest of Sicily, a program of numerous Christian constructions was launched, perhaps including that of Gibilmanna. The church, again mentioned in 1178, was a priorate in 1228, and thus no more a Benedictine possession.

In 1535, father Sebastiano Majo da Gratteri, one of the first follower of the Capuchine reformation, established himself at Gibilmann. Next to the old Benedictine chapel a first convent was built. In the early 17th century it was decided to build a new church in place of the Benedictine chapel: finished in 1623, it was opened in 1625, including a sacristy and an entrance staircase. The façade was preceded by a portico. The new church also received, from the old church, an image of Madonna with Child, a Byzantine-style fresco, a statue of the Virgin and a Crucifix (also in Byzantine-style). For the high altar a new painting was commissioned, depicting the Assumption. The old chapel was demolished. In the same centuries, the convent was further enlarged and enriched. Artworks added include statues of St. ohn the Baptist and St. Helena next to the altar of the Madonna Chapel.

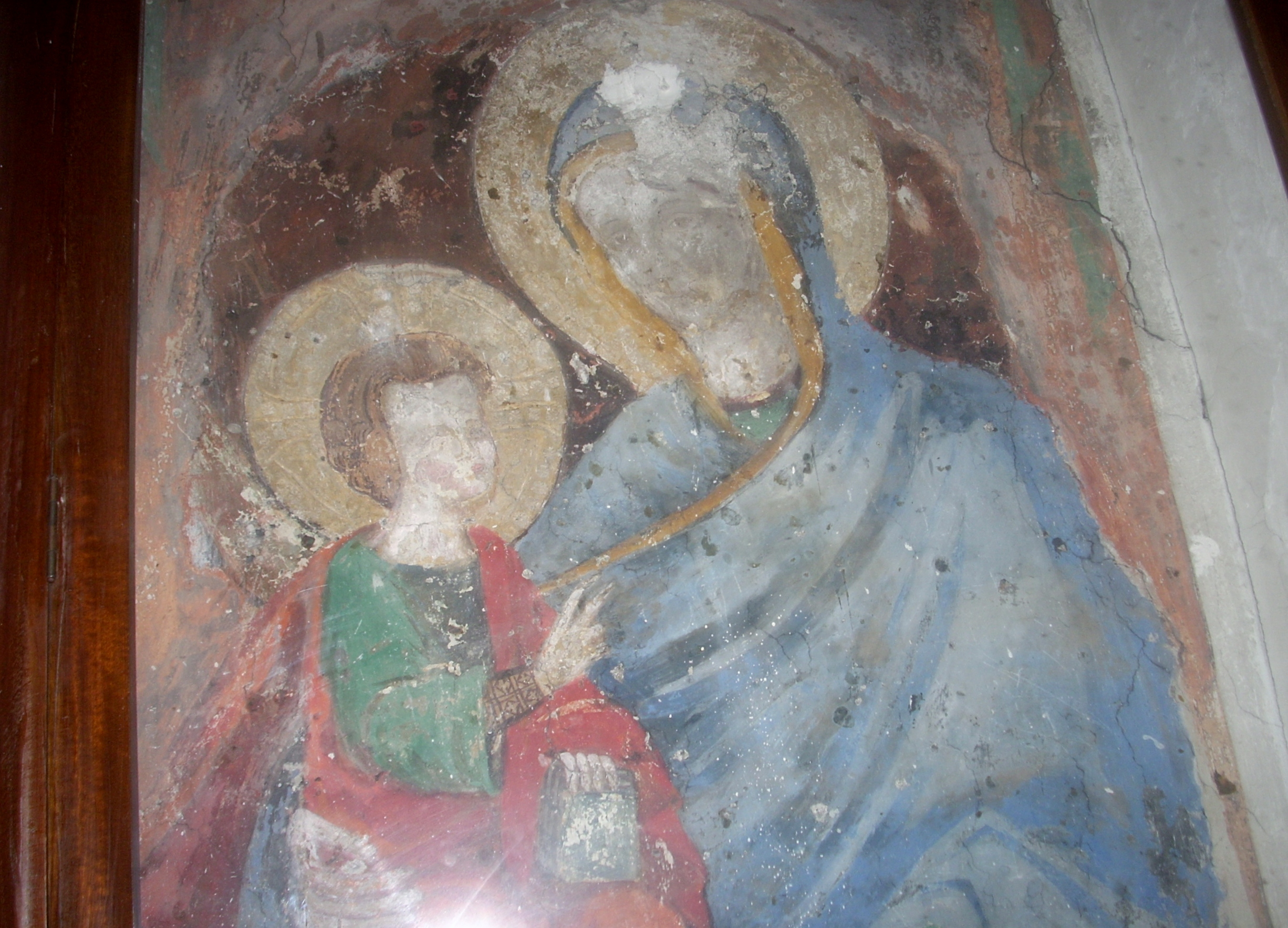
11th-century Byzantine fresco of the Madonna with child retrieved from the former church

After the portico preceding the church crumbled down, the façade was remade in Neo-Gothic style in 1907.
