= Gibilmanna Observatory =

Coordinates: 37.990128°N 14.026290°E

The Gibilmanna Observatory is a research station used for a diverse range of studies set up and run by the Istituto Nazionale di Geofisica e Vulcanologia (INGV) and it is located on Cozzo Timpa Rossa at 1005 m.a.s.l. near Cefalù, a town in the district of Palermo, Italy.

It is one of the 120 stations of the Italian Magnetic Network measuring Earth magnetism field in Italy, and in 2005 INGV's Centro Nazionale Terremoti (CNT) selected it to set up the OBS Lab aimed at designing, manufacturing and managing the Ocean-Bottom Seismometer with Hydrophone (OBS/H), later deployed for monitoring the Marsili submarine volcano in the Tyrrhenian Sea.

In addition, the observatory is one of the 110 Data Collection Platform (D.C.P.) stations of the Aeronautica Militare Italiana for automatic weather data gathering and transmission to the METEOSAT satellite. Since 1976 this station has also been equipped for Ionospheric research and it is the most southern station of its kind in Europe. Real time ionograms are recorded by the INGV own developed AIS-INGV ionosonde installed at the station and reported on the INGV ionospheric website.
