= SS Empire Kestrel =

World War II merchant ship of the United Kingdom

History

United States
- Name: SS Lake Ellithorpe (1919–1932); SS Texas Trader (1932–1940)
- Owner: United States Shipping Board (1919–1927); New England, New York & Texas Steamship Corp. (1927–1928); Newtex Steamship Corporation (1928–1940)
- Builder: Great Lakes Engineering Works, Ecorse, Michigan
- Yard number: 230
- Launched: 28 August 1919
- Completed: November 1919
- In service: 1919
- Out of service: 1940
- Identification: US Official number: 219019
- Fate: Sold to UK, 1940

United Kingdom
- Name: SS Empire Kestrel
- Owner: Ministry of War Transport
- Operator: William Reardon Smith & Sons
- Acquired: 1940
- Identification: UK Official number: 167612
- Fate: Torpedoed and sunk by Italian aircraft, 16 August 1943

General characteristics
- Type: Cargo ship
- Tonnage: 2,674 GRT; 1,658 NRT
- Length: 253 ft 5 in (77.24 m)
- Beam: 43 ft 10 in (13.36 m)
- Depth: 26 ft (7.9 m)

SS Empire Kestrel was a 2,674 GRT, 5,050 DWT cargo ship built by Great Lakes Engineering Works of Ecorse, Michigan. Completed in 1919 as SS Lake Ellithorpe for the United States Shipping Board (USSB), she was sold to the New England, New York & Texas Steamship Corporation of New York in 1927, then to the Newtex Steamship Corporation of New York City in 1928. In 1932, she was renamed Texas Trader. In 1940 she was sold to the Ministry of War Transport. Reflagged as a British ship and renamed Empire Kestrel, she was managed by William Reardon Smith & Sons Co.

She was attacked on 16 August 1943 by an Italian Savoia-Marchetti S.79 aircraft, piloted by Lt. Vezio Terzi, and sunk by an aerial torpedo off the coast Algeria, near Bgayet, in position 37°10′N 04°35′E while part of Convoy UGS-13.
