= German submarine U-172 =

German World War II submarine

Coordinates: 26.483°N 29.967°W

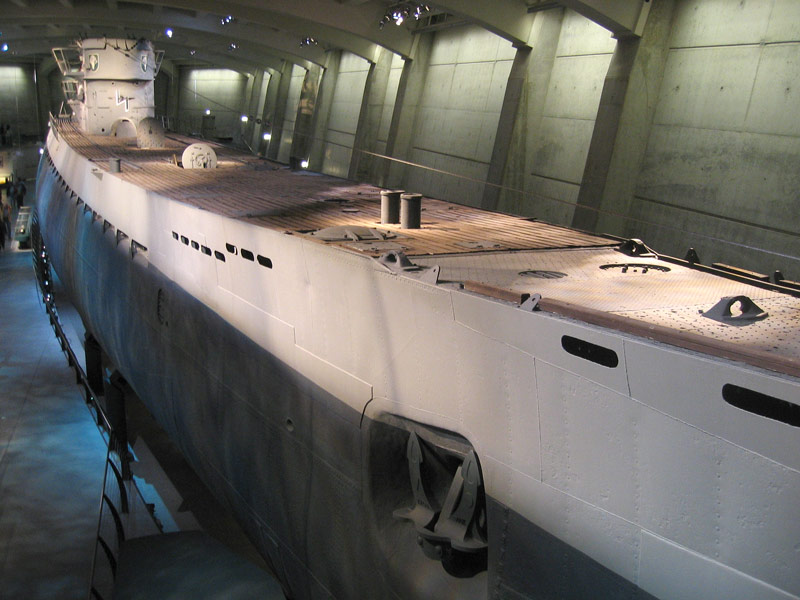
- U-505, a typical Type IXC boat

History

Nazi Germany
- Name: U-172
- Ordered: 23 December 1939
- Builder: DeSchiMAG AG Weser, Bremen
- Yard number: 1012
- Laid down: 11 December 1940
- Launched: 31 July 1941
- Commissioned: 5 November 1941
- Fate: Sunk 13 December 1943

General characteristics
- Class & type: Type IXC submarine
- Displacement: 1,120 t (1,100 long tons) surfaced; 1,232 t (1,213 long tons) submerged
- Length: 76.76 m (251 ft 10 in) o/a; 58.75 m (192 ft 9 in) pressure hull
- Beam: 6.76 m (22 ft 2 in) o/a; 4.40 m (14 ft 5 in) pressure hull
- Height: 9.60 m (31 ft 6 in)
- Draught: 4.70 m (15 ft 5 in)
- Installed power: 4,400 PS (3,200 kW; 4,300 bhp) (diesels); 1,000 PS (740 kW; 990 shp) (electric)
- Propulsion: 2 shafts; 2 × diesel engines; 2 × electric motors
- Speed: 18.3 knots (33.9 km/h; 21.1 mph) surfaced; 7.3 knots (13.5 km/h; 8.4 mph) submerged
- Range: 13,450 nmi (24,910 km; 15,480 mi) at 10 knots (19 km/h; 12 mph) surfaced; 64 nmi (119 km; 74 mi) at 4 knots (7.4 km/h; 4.6 mph) submerged
- Test depth: 230 m (750 ft)
- Complement: 4 officers, 44 enlisted
- Armament: 6 × torpedo tubes (4 bow, 2 stern); 22 × 53.3 cm (21 in) torpedoes; 1 × 10.5 cm (4.1 in) SK C/32 deck gun (180 rounds); 1 × 3.7 cm (1.5 in) SK C/30 AA gun; 1 × twin 2 cm FlaK 30 AA guns

Service record
- Part of: 4th U-boat Flotilla; 5 November 1941 – 30 April 1942; 10th U-boat Flotilla; 1 May 1942 – 13 December 1943
- Identification codes: M 29 596
- Commanders: Kptlt. Carl Emmermann; 5 November 1941 – 31 October 1943; Oblt.z.S. Hermann Hoffmann; 1 November 1943 – 13 December 1943
- Operations: 6 patrols: 1st patrol: 22 April – 3 May 1943; 2nd patrol: 11 May – 21 July 1942; 3rd patrol: 19 August – 27 December 1942; 4th patrol: 21 February – 17 April 1943; 5th patrol: 29 May – 7 September 1943; 6th patrol: 22 November – 13 December 1943
- Victories: 26 merchant ships sunk (152,080 GRT)

German submarine U-172 was a Type IXC U-boat of Nazi Germany's Kriegsmarine during World War II. She was first assigned to the 4th U-boat Flotilla for training and on 1 May 1942 was reassigned to the 10th flotilla, an operational long-range organization.

== Design ==
German Type IXC submarines were slightly larger than the original Type IXBs. U-172 had a displacement of 1,120 tonnes (1,100 long tons) when at the surface and 1,232 tonnes (1,213 long tons) while submerged. The U-boat had a total length of 76.76 m (251 ft 10 in), a pressure hull length of 58.75 m (192 ft 9 in), a beam of 6.76 m (22 ft 2 in), a height of 9.60 m (31 ft 6 in), and a draught of 4.70 m (15 ft 5 in). The submarine was powered by two MAN M 9 V 40/46 supercharged four-stroke, nine-cylinder diesel engines producing a total of 4,400 metric horsepower (3,240 kW; 4,340 shp) for use while surfaced, two Siemens-Schuckert 2 GU 345/34 double-acting electric motors producing a total of 1,000 metric horsepower (740 kW; 990 shp) for use while submerged. She had two shafts and two 1.92 m (6 ft) propellers. The boat was capable of operating at depths of up to 230 metres (750 ft).

The submarine had a maximum surface speed of 18.3 knots (33.9 km/h; 21.1 mph) and a maximum submerged speed of 7.3 knots (13.5 km/h; 8.4 mph). When submerged, the boat could operate for 63 nautical miles (117 km; 72 mi) at 4 knots (7.4 km/h; 4.6 mph); when surfaced, she could travel 13,450 nautical miles (24,910 km; 15,480 mi) at 10 knots (19 km/h; 12 mph). U-172 was fitted with six 53.3 cm (21 in) torpedo tubes (four fitted at the bow and two at the stern), 22 torpedoes, one 10.5 cm (4.13 in) SK C/32 naval gun, 180 rounds, and a 3.7 cm (1.5 in) SK C/30 as well as a 2 cm (0.79 in) C/30 anti-aircraft gun. The boat had a complement of forty-eight.

== Service history ==
U-172 was laid down at the DeSchiMAG AG Weser yard in Bremen as yard number 1012. She was launched on 31 July 1941 and commissioned on 5 November under the command of Kapitänleutnant Carl Emmermann. She conducted six patrols, sinking 26 ships totalling (152,080 gross register tons (GRT)). She was sunk by American aircraft and warships in December 1943, west of the Canary Islands.

=== First patrol ===
U-172's first patrol commenced with her departure from Kiel on 24 April 1942. Her route took her through the Kattegat and Skaggerak, through the gap between the Faroe and Shetland Islands and into the Atlantic Ocean. She arrived at her new base at Lorient in occupied France on 3 May. She would use this port as her base for the rest of her career.

=== Second patrol ===
Having left Lorient on 11 May 1942, the boat moved into the mid-Atlantic and sank Athelknight southeast of Bermuda on the 27th. Some survivors did not reach land until 23 June, having sailed some 1,200 nmi (2,200 km; 1,400 mi). Moving to the eastern Caribbean Sea, she sank three more ships, City of Alma, Delfina and Sicilien in early June.

She attacked Lebore on the 14th, which assumed a 45° list to starboard on being hit. The ship was struck again in the engine room followed by fire from the U-boat's deck gun. A third torpedo caused the ship to capsize. Twelve more deck gun rounds and a 'coup de grâce' sent the ship to the bottom. Casualties were relatively light, the first assistant engineer was the only fatality, leaving 93 men to be rescued by US warships.

Four more vessels were consigned to watery graves. One of them, the Colombian sailing ship Resolute, was stopped with U-172's 20mm gun and sunk with grenades. Another, Santa Rita, had been abandoned by her crew, but was still afloat. A party from the U-boat boarded her and set scuttling charges. The master was found and taken prisoner. He was landed at Lorient when the submarine returned to base and was transferred, initially to Wilhelmshaven then the POW camp at Milag Nord near Bremen.

=== Third patrol ===
U-172 left Lorient for her third sortie on 19 August 1942. It would be her longest (131 days) and in terms of tonnage sunk, most successful patrol.

That total was boosted with the destruction of the British troopship SS Orcades (23,456 GRT) southwest of Cape Town on 10 October. She was first struck by two torpedoes, but following a third hit, a skeleton crew, gunners and volunteers from the passengers remained on board to try and save the ship. They included a Petty Officer telegraphist who sent a second distress call after the radio operators had abandoned their position. In all, Orcades was hit by six torpedoes before sinking with a broken back. Forty-five men died, but there were 1,022 survivors who were saved by SS Narwik.

Following the sinking of Aldington Court on 31 October, the survivors were only spotted and picked up by City of Christiania when the third officer climbed a lifeboat's mast and waved a shirt.

SS Benlomond was another victim sunk, on 23 November. The only survivor of this attack was Poon Lim, who eked out an existence for 133 days in the South Atlantic on a Carley float, (a type of liferaft). He received the British Empire Medal from King George VI for this feat.

=== Fourth patrol ===
The true horrors of the Battle of the Atlantic were illustrated when the U-boat sank SS City of Pretoria in mid-Ocean about 320 nmi (590 km; 370 mi) northwest of the Azores on 16 March 1943. One of the passengers had already survived 51 days in a lifeboat from a previous sinking. This time he was not so lucky - nor were the other occupants of the ship; there were no survivors.

U-172 sank three other ships; one of them, SS Benjamin Harrison, had been a member of the ill-fated Convoy PQ 17.

The submarine did not escape unscathed; while attacking convoy RS-3 on 28 March, as one of eight U-boats, she was seriously damaged but still managed to sink Moanda on the 29th. She was also attacked on 7 April by two B-24 Liberators of 1 Squadron, USAAF south of the Azores. Despite having 12 depth charges dropped on her, she stayed on the surface, fought it out and sustained no damage.

The boat returned to Lorient on 17 April.

=== Fifth patrol ===
For her fifth patrol, U-172 moved into the waters of the South Atlantic, departing Lorient on 29 May 1943. Having sunk Vernon City south southeast of St Paul Rocks (between South America and Africa) on 28 June, she headed toward the Brazilian coast, where she caused the destruction of three more ships: African Star (12 July), Harmonic (15 July) and Fort Chilcotin (24 July).

The submarine was attacked by unidentified aircraft on 11 August while rescuing the crew of U-604, in the aftermath of that boat's scuttling. One man from U-172 was killed.

=== Sixth patrol and loss ===
U-172 left Lorient for the last time on 22 November 1943. She was sunk on 13 December, in mid-Atlantic west of the Canary Islands by Grumman TBF Avenger and Grumman F4F Wildcat aircraft from the escort carrier USS Bogue (CVE-9), and the American destroyers George E. Badger (DD-196), Clemson (DD-186), Osmond Ingram (DD-255) and Du Pont (DD-152). The battle between U-172 and the small armada of ships and aircraft lasted for 27 hours and as many as 200 depth charges were dropped by the destroyers. Thirteen of U-172's crew were killed; 46 survived the sinking.

=== Wolfpacks ===
U-172 took part in three wolfpacks, namely:

- Eisbär (25 August - 1 September 1942)
- Unverzagt (12 – 17 March 1943)
- Seeräuber (25 – 30 March 1943)

== Summary of raiding history ==
Date	Ship	Nationality	Tonnage	Fate
27 May 1942	Athelknight	United Kingdom	8,940	Sunk
3 June 1942	City of Alma	United States	5,446	Sunk
5 June 1942	Delfina	United States	3,480	Sunk
8 June 1942	Sicilien	United States	1,654	Sunk
14 June 1942	Lebore	United States	8,289	Sunk
15 June 1942	Bennestvet	Norway	2,438	Sunk
18 June 1942	Motorex	United Kingdom	1,958	Sunk
23 June 1942	Resolute	Colombia	35	Sunk
9 July 1942	Santa Rita	United States	8,379	Sunk
7 October 1942	Chicksaw City	United States	6,196	Sunk
7 October 1942	Firethorn	Panama	4,700	Sunk
8 October 1942	Pantelis	Greece	3,845	Sunk
10 October 1942	Orcades	United Kingdom	23,456	Sunk
31 October 1942	Aldington Court	United Kingdom	4,891	Sunk
2 November 1942	Llandilo	United Kingdom	4,966	Sunk
23 November 1942	Benlomond	United Kingdom	6,630	Sunk
28 November 1942	Alaskan	United States	5,364	Sunk
4 March 1943	City of Pretoria	United Kingdom	8,049	Sunk
13 March 1943	Thorstrand	Norway	3,041	Sunk
13 March 1943	Keystone	United States	5,565	Sunk
16 March 1943	Benjamin Harrison	United States	7,191	Sunk
29 March 1943	Moanda	Belgium	4,621	Sunk
28 June 1943	Vernon City	United Kingdom	4,748	Sunk
12 July 1943	African Star	United States	6,507	Sunk
15 July 1943	Harmonic	United Kingdom	4,558	Sunk
24 July 1943	Fort Chilcotin	United Kingdom	7,133	Sunk

== Bibliography ==
- Bishop, Chris (2006). Kriegsmarine U-Boats, 1939-45. London: Amber Books. ISBN 978-1-904687-96-2.
- Busch, Rainer; Röll, Hans-Joachim (1999). German U-boat commanders of World War II : a biographical dictionary. Translated by Brooks, Geoffrey. London, Annapolis, Md: Greenhill Books, Naval Institute Press. ISBN 1-55750-186-6.
- Busch, Rainer; Röll, Hans-Joachim (1999). Deutsche U-Boot-Verluste von September 1939 bis Mai 1945 [German U-boat losses from September 1939 to May 1945]. Der U-Boot-Krieg (in German). Vol. IV. Hamburg, Berlin, Bonn: Mittler. ISBN 3-8132-0514-2.
- Gröner, Erich; Jung, Dieter; Maass, Martin (1991). U-boats and Mine Warfare Vessels. German Warships 1815–1945. Vol. 2. Translated by Thomas, Keith; Magowan, Rachel. London: Conway Maritime Press. ISBN 0-85177-593-4.
