= Cefalù =

Cefalù Cifalù (Sicilian) Kèfalos (Greek)
- Comune
- Comune di Cefalù
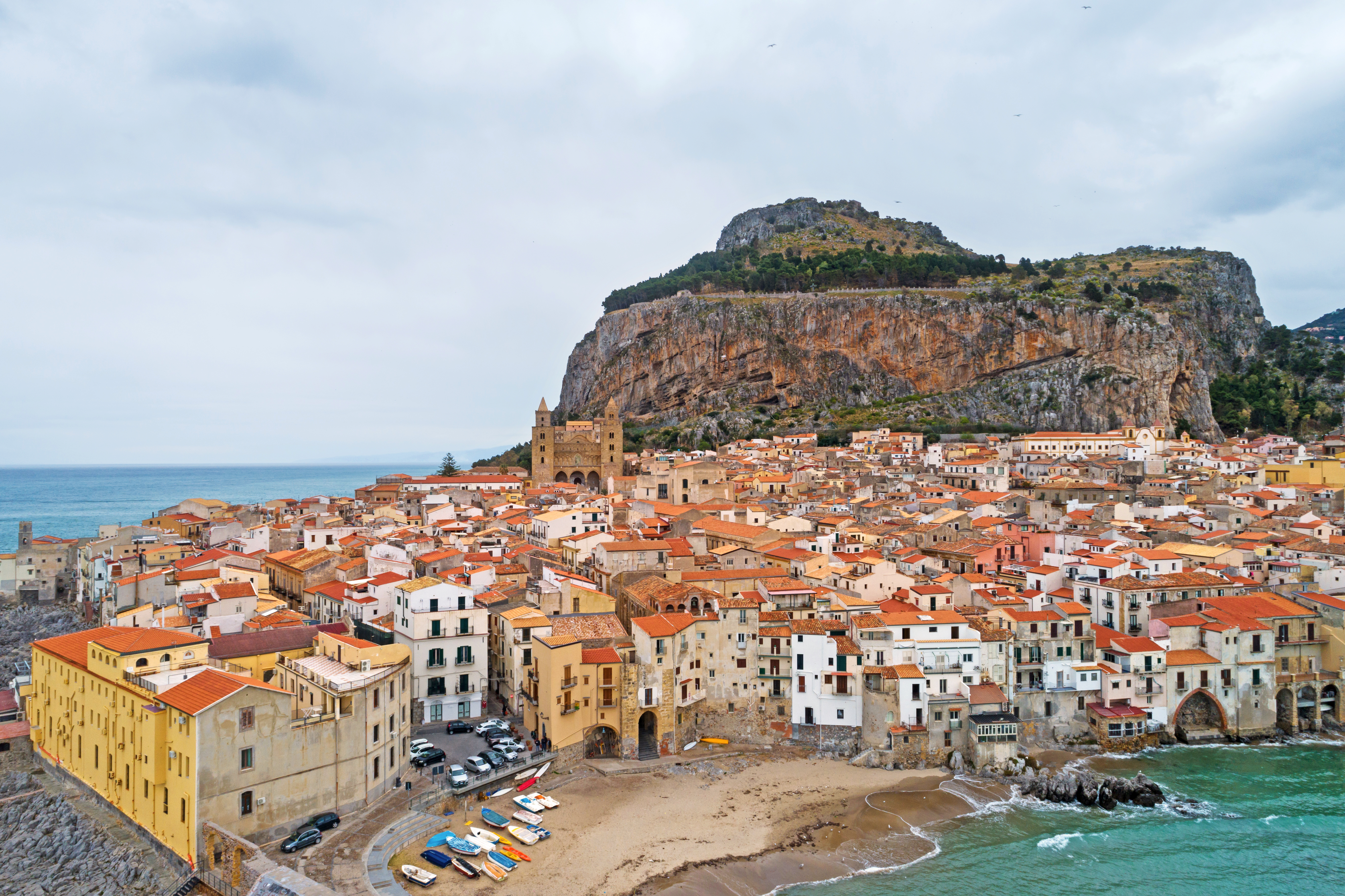

- Coat of arms

- Location within Italy Location within Sicily
- Coordinates: 38°02′06″N 14°01′16″E
- Country: Italy
- Region: Sicily
- Metropolitan city: Palermo (PA)
- Frazioni: Sant'Ambrogio, Gibilmanna

Government
  - Mayor: Daniele Tumminello (PD)

Area
  - Total: 65 km^{2} (25 sq mi)
- Elevation: 16 m (52 ft)

Population (2007)
  - Total: 13,777
  - Density: 210/km^{2} (550/sq mi)
- Demonym: Cefaludesi or Cefalutani
- Time zone: UTC+1 (CET)
  - Summer (DST): UTC+2 (CEST)
- Postal code: 90015
- Dialing code: 0921
- Patron saint: SS. Salvatore
- Saint day: December 8
- Website: Official website

Cefalù (Italian: [tʃefaˈlu]; Sicilian: Cifalù), classically known as Cephaloedium (Ancient Greek: Κεφαλοίδιον, romanized: Kephaloídion), is a city and comune in the Italian Metropolitan City of Palermo, located on the Tyrrhenian coast of Sicily about 70 km (43 mi) east of the provincial capital and 185 km (115 mi) west of Messina. The town, with its population of just under 14,000, is one of the major tourist attractions in the region. Despite its size, every year it attracts millions of tourists from all parts of Sicily, and also from all over Italy and Europe. It is one of I Borghi più belli d'Italia ("The most beautiful villages of Italy").

== Names ==
The city's Sicilian name is Cifalù. It was named by the Greeks who called it Kephaloídion (Κεφαλοίδιον) or Kephaloidís (Κεφαλοιδίς). These were latinised as Cephaloedium and Cephaloedis. Under Arab rule, it was known as Gaflūdī.

Under Carthaginian rule, it was known as "Cape Melqart" (Punic: 𐤓𐤔 𐤌𐤋𐤒𐤓𐤕, rš mlqrt), after the Tyrian god.

== History ==
Of Siculian foundation, in the fourth century BC the Greeks gave the indigenous settlement the name of Kephaloídion, evidently derived from its situation on a lofty and precipitous rock, forming a bold headland (Ancient Greek: κεφαλή, kephalḗ, 'head') projecting into the sea. Despite the Greek origin of its name, no mention of it is found in the works of Thucydides, who says that Himera was the only Greek colony on this coast of the island. It is possible that Cephaloedium was at this time merely a fortress (φρούριον, phroúrion) of Magna Graecia belonging to the Himeraeans and may have been peopled by refugees after the destruction of Himera, who settled alongside the native Sicels.

Its name first appears in history at the time of the Carthaginian expedition under Himilco, 396 BC, when that general concluded a treaty with the Himeraeans and the inhabitants of Cephaloedium. But after the defeat of the Carthaginian armament, Dionysius the Elder made himself master of Cephaloedium, which was betrayed into his hands. At a later period it was again independent, but apparently on friendly terms with the Carthaginians. It was attacked and taken by Agathocles, 307 BC.

In the First Punic War, it was reduced by the Roman fleet under Aulus Atilius Calatinus and Scipio Nasica, 254 BC, but by treachery and not by force of arms. Cicero speaks of it as apparently a flourishing town, enjoying full municipal privileges; it was, in his time, one of the civitates decumanae which paid the tithes of their corn in kind to the Roman state and suffered severely from the oppressions and exactions of Gaius Verres. It also minted coins. No subsequent mention of it is found in history, but it is noticed among the towns of Sicily by the geographers Strabo, Pliny, and Ptolemy, and at a later period its name is still found in the itineraries.

After the fall of the Western Roman Empire, the town remained part of the Byzantine Empire and the settlement was eventually moved from the plain to the current spur for defense. This occurred among many cities during the Byzantine era, as the Mediterranean was no longer solely controlled by the empire and was subject to Arab incursions. The old town was never entirely abandoned. In 858, after a long siege, it was conquered by the Aghlabids. For the following two centuries, it was part of the Emirate of Sicily.

In 1063, the Normans captured it. In 1131, Roger II, king of Sicily, transferred it from its almost inaccessible position to one at the foot of the rock, where there was a small but excellent harbor. There he ordered construction of the present Norman-style cathedral. In addition to Arabs, the area was still inhabited by its original Greek speakers (today called Byzantine Greeks, then called Rûm i.e. 'Romans,' by the Arabs), and these Christians were still members of the Greek Orthodox Church. Between the 13th century and 1451, the city was controlled by different feudal families, and then it became a possession of the Roman bishops of Cefalù.

During the Risorgimento, the patriot Salvatore Spinuzza was shot here in 1857. Cefalù became part of the Kingdom of Italy in 1861.

The French painter Claude Monet visited Cefalù in 1884. His experience of the landscape and the light inspired several of his works.

== Main sights ==
=== Cathedral ===
The Cathedral, begun in 1131, in a style of Norman architecture which would be more accurately called Sicilian Romanesque. The exterior is well preserved, and is largely decorated with interlacing pointed arches; the windows also are pointed. On each side of the façade is a massive tower of four stories. The round-headed Norman portal is worthy of note. A semi-circular apse is set into the east end wall. It has a formidable image of Christ Pantacrator (reminiscent of its Byzantine era). Its strengthening counterforts that work like buttresses, are shaped as paired columns to lighten their aspect. The groined vaulting of the roof is visible in the choir and the right transept, while the rest of the church has a wooden roof. Fine cloisters, coeval with the cathedral, adjoin it.

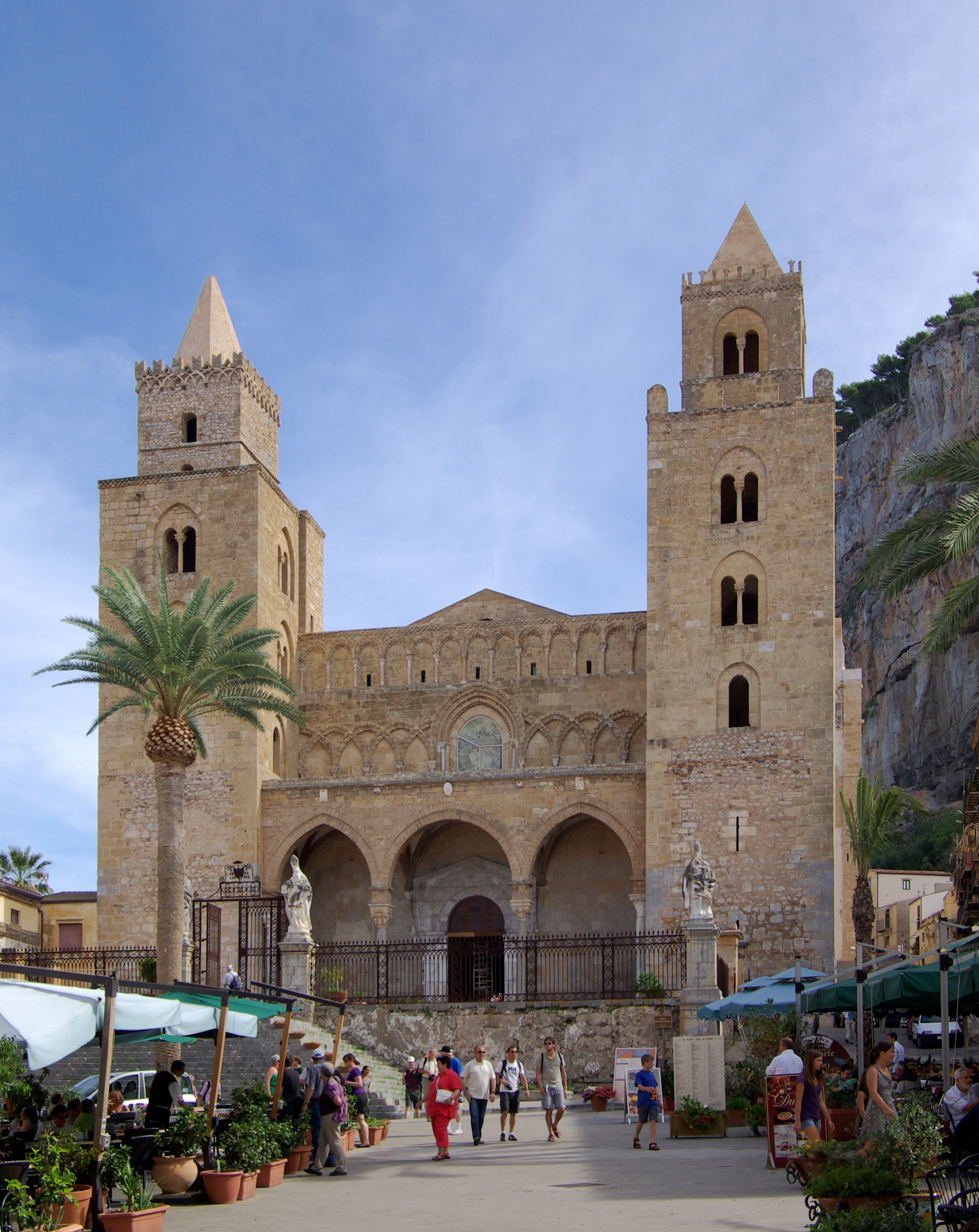
Two strong matching towers flank the cathedral porch, which has three arches (rebuilt around 1400) corresponding to the nave and the two aisles.

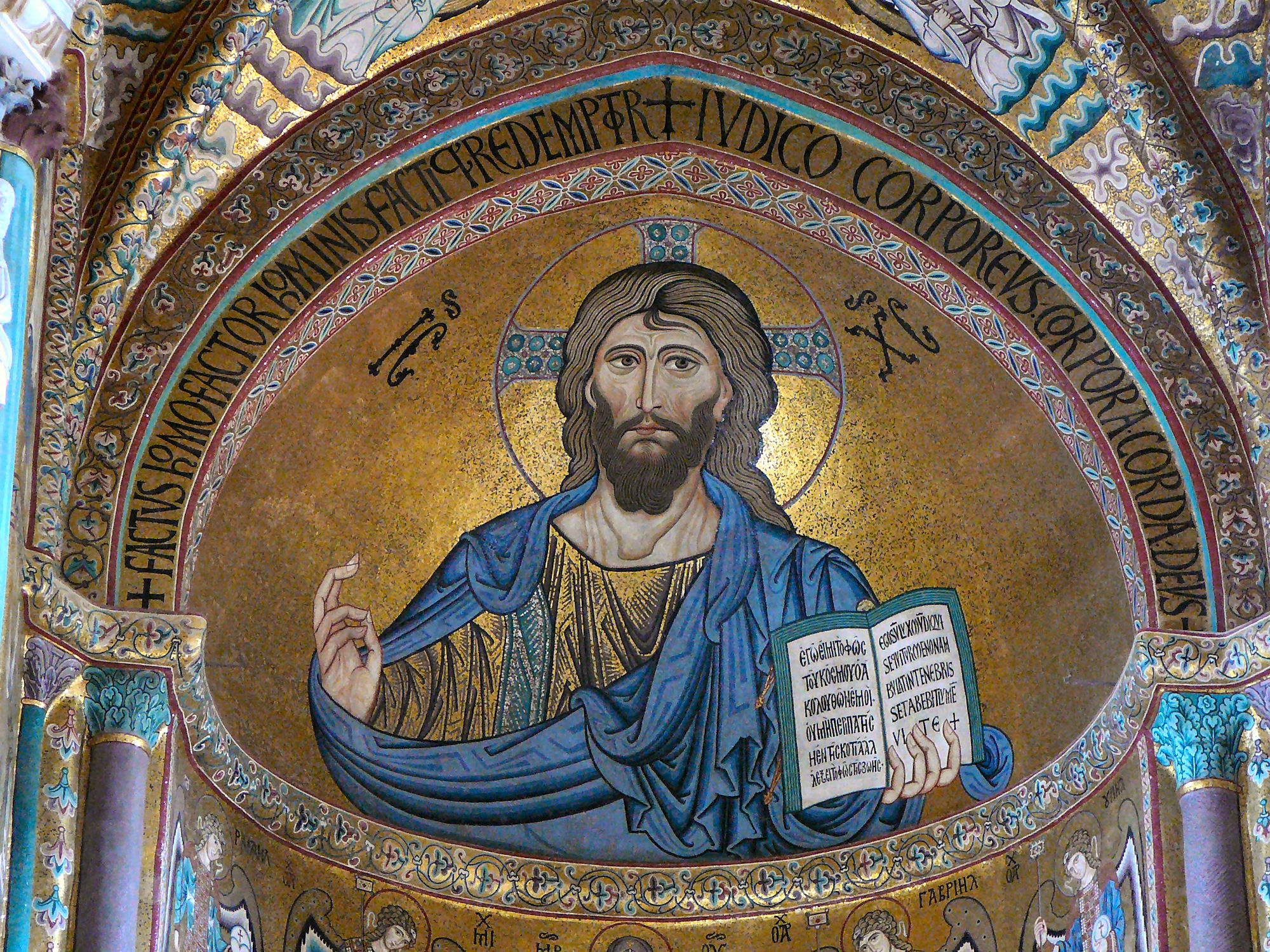
Christus Pantokrator in the apsis of the cathedral

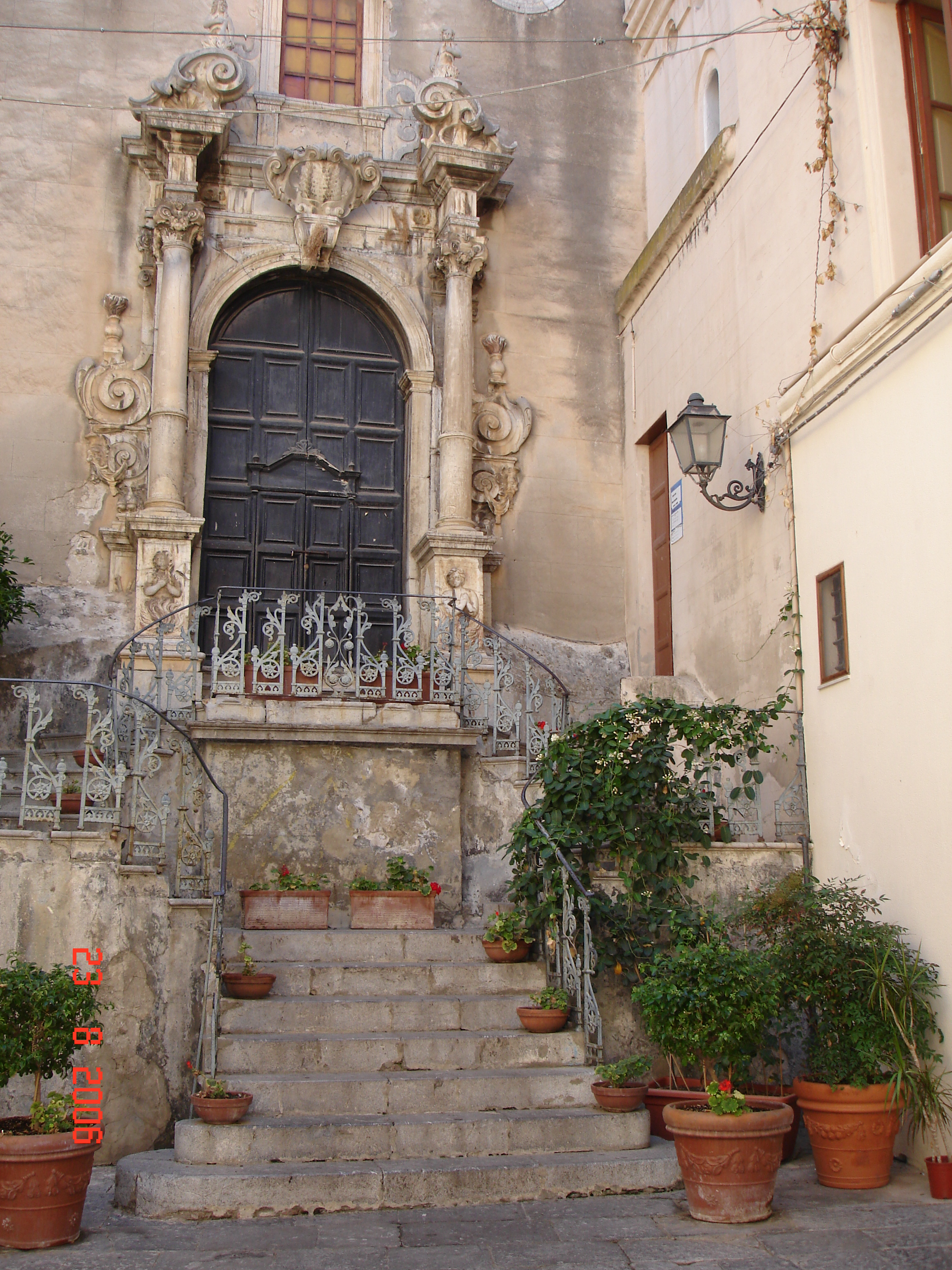
Church of St. Stefano.

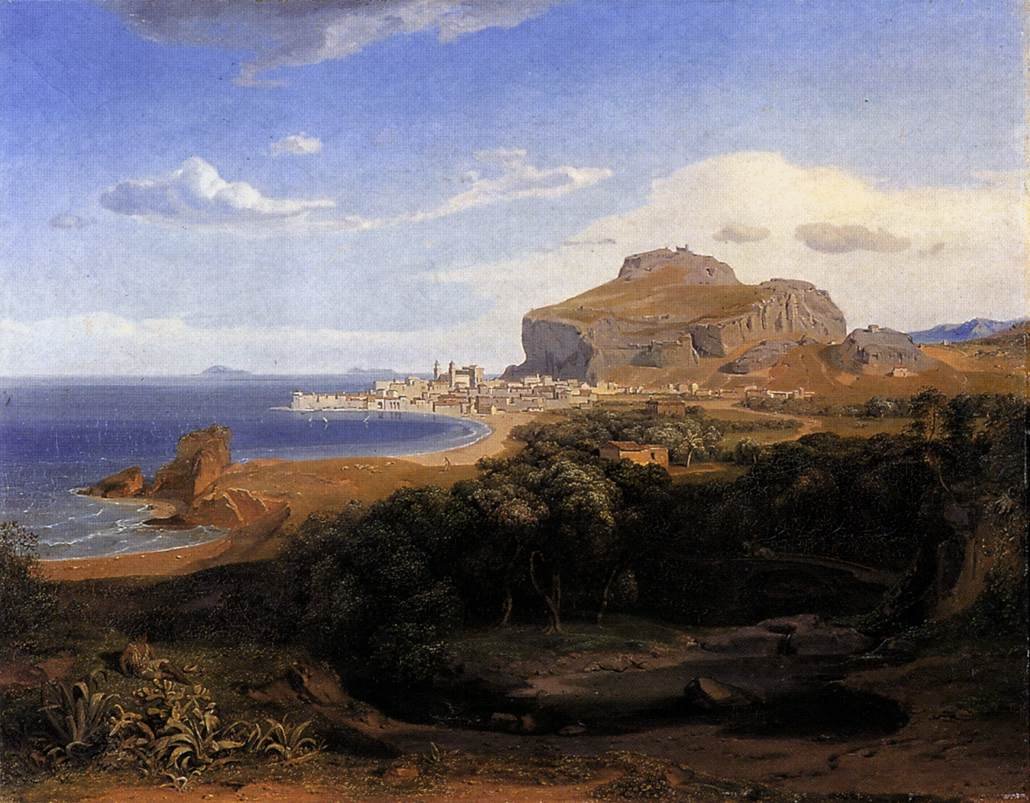
Cefalù in 1830, by Carl Anton Joseph Rottmann.

The interior of the cathedral was restored in 1559, though the pointed arches of the nave, borne by ancient granite columns, are still visible; and the only mosaics preserved are those of the apse and the last bay of the choir; they are remarkably fine specimens of the Byzantine art of the period (1148) and, though restored in 1859–62, have suffered much less than those at Palermo and Monreale from the process. The figure of the Pantocrator gracing the apse is especially noteworthy.

The cathedral is one of nine structures comprising the UNESCO World Heritage Site, Arab-Norman Palermo and the Cathedral Churches of Cefalù and Monreale.

=== Other churches ===
- Santa Maria dell'Odigitria, popularly referred to simply as Itria, its name the rendition in Italian of the Greek Hodegetria, one of the standard iconographic depictions of the Virgin Mary. Probably built over a preexisting Byzantine church of the same name, the current building is from the 16th century. Until 1961 it consisted of two different religious edifices, the second being a chapel devoted to St. Michael Archangel; both were a property of the Confraternity of St. Mary of the Odigitria.
- Santa Oliva (1787). It has a tuff entrance.
- San Sebastiano (probably 1523). It has a single nave with two frescoed niches on every side.
- Sant'Andrea.
- San Leonardo, mentioned from 1159 and, until the restoration of 1558, dedicated to St. George. The original portal, now closed behind a wall, has vegetable decorations similar to the Cathedral's ones.
- The Immacolatella (1661).
- The Oratory of the Santissimo Sacramento (1688).
- Chapel of San Biagio (St. Blaise).
- Santo Stefano or Church of Purgatory.
- Santissima Trinità.
- Santissima Annunziata (c. 1511). The façade has a large rose window and a relief with the Annunciation.
- The Monastery of St. Catherine.

=== Other structures ===
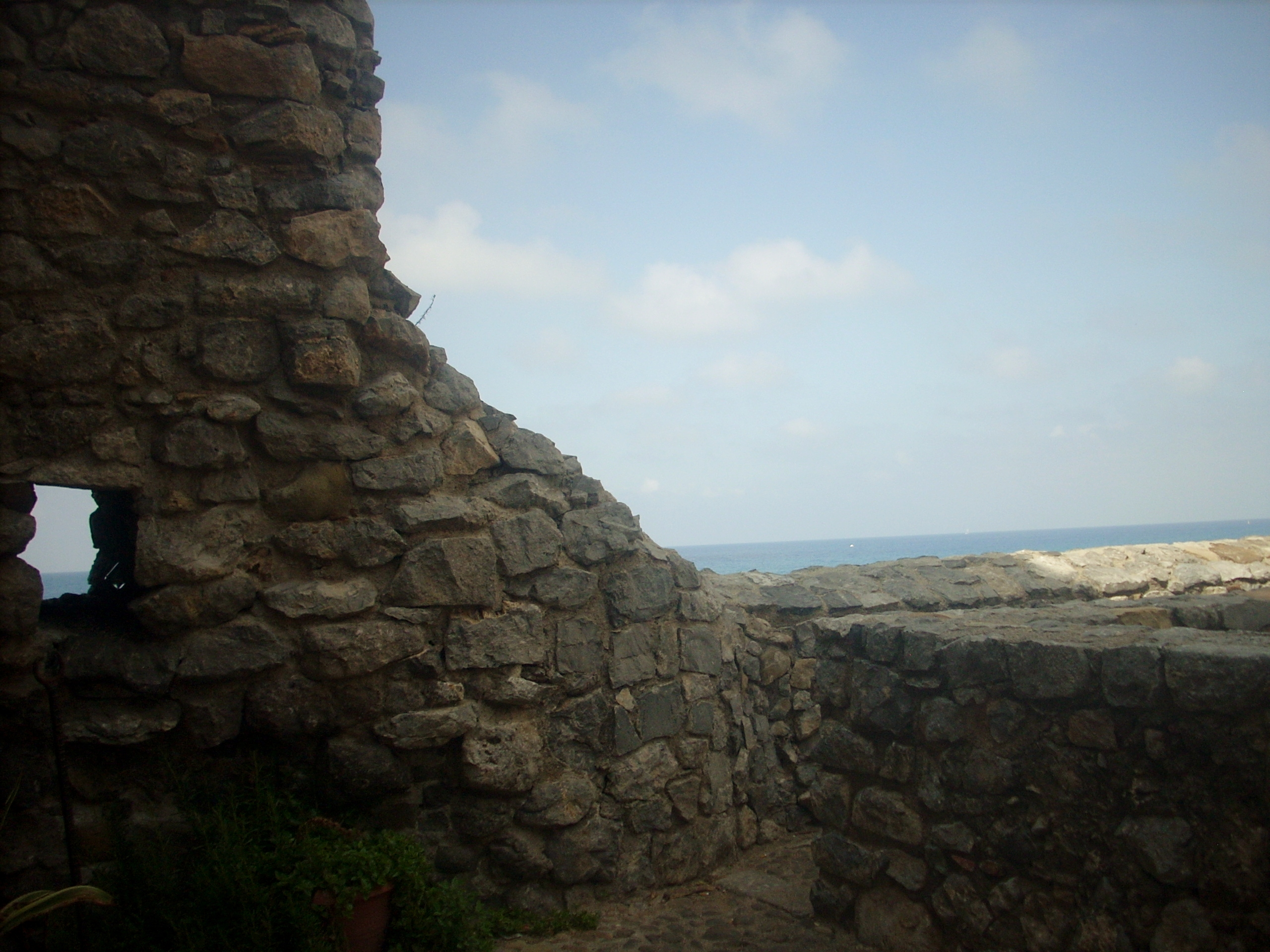
Remains of megalithic wall, c. 500–400 BC

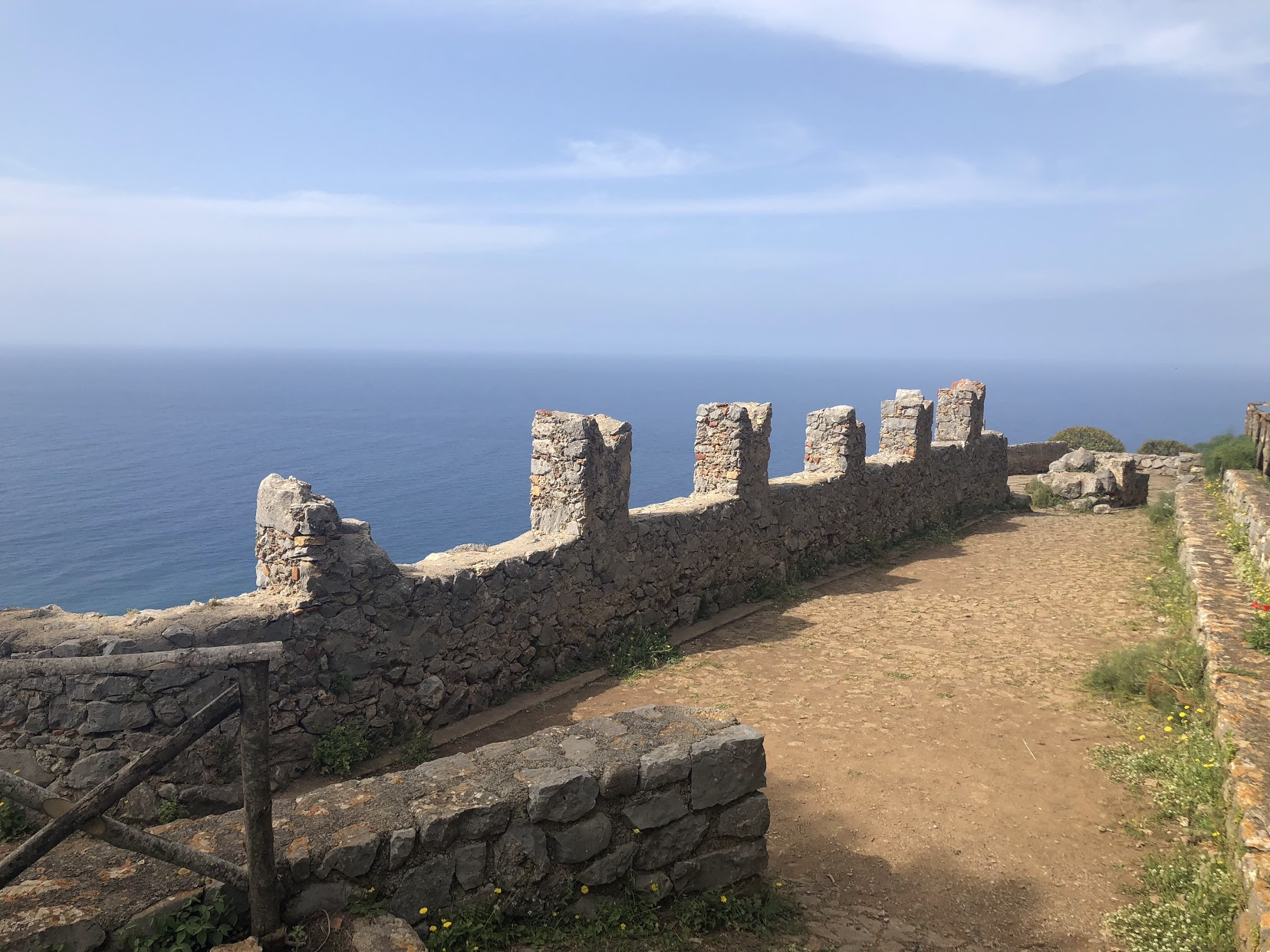
Remains of Château de Cefalù wall.

Some remains of the ancient city are still visible, on the summit of the rock; but the nature of the site proves that it could never have been more than a small town, and probably owed its importance only to its almost impregnable position. Fazello speaks of the remains of the walls as still existing in his time, as well as those of a temple of Doric architecture, of which the foundations only are now visible. But the most curious monument still remaining of the ancient city is an edifice, consisting of various apartments, and having the appearance of a palace or domestic residence, but constructed wholly of large irregular blocks of limestone, in the style commonly called polygonal or Cyclopean. Rude mouldings approximating to those of the Doric order, are hewn on the face of the massive blocks. The doorways are of finely-cut stone, and of Greek type, and the date, though uncertain, cannot, from the careful jointing of the blocks, be very early. This building, which is almost unique of its kind, is the more remarkable, from its being the only example of this style of masonry, so common in Central Italy, which occurs in the island of Sicily. It is fully described and figured by Dr. Nott in the Annali dell'Instituto di Corrispondenza Archeologica, for the year 1831 (vol. iii. p. 270-87).

On the summit of the promontory are extensive remains of a Norman castle. The town's fortifications formerly extended to the shore, on the side where the modern town now is, in the form of two long walls protecting the port. There are remains of a wall of massive rectangular blocks of stone at the modern Porta Garibaldi on the south.

Other sights include:

- The Seminary and the Bishops Palace.
- Palazzo Atenasio Martino (15th century). The court has 16th-century frescoes.
- Palazzo Maria (13th century). The medieval portal and a mullioned window, with Catalan-style vegetable decorations, are still visible.
- Palazzo Piraino (16th century).
- Osterio Magno. According to the tradition, it was built by Roger II as his mansion, but it probably dates from the 14th century. Traces of the medieval tower and decoration can be seen. Excavations held in the interior have shown the presence of ancient edifices and ceramics.
- Ancient Roman baths.
- The remains of the Abbey of Thelema, established by the occultist Aleister Crowley in 1920 as a magical commune before he was ordered to leave by the Benito Mussolini government in 1923. The abbey is now in a state of severe disrepair.

Not far from the town are the sanctuary of Gibilmanna and the Gibilmanna Observatory.

- Museo Mandralisca important regional collection of art and archaeology from ancient Greek and Arab ceramics through sculpture and painting (Antonello da Messina: Portrait of a man) to furniture, porcelain and numismatics, a rich library.

== Sister cities ==
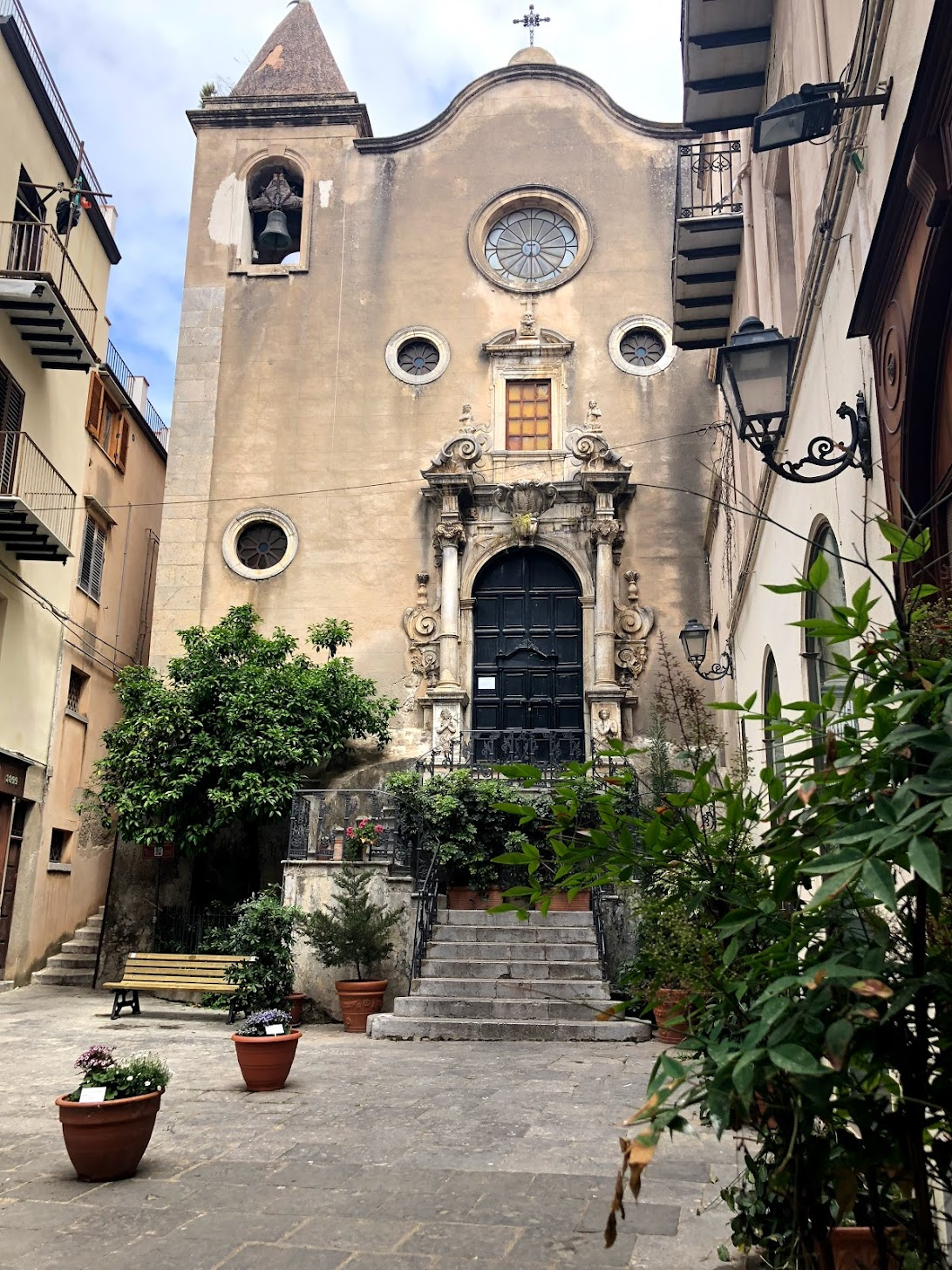
Front of Church of Saint Stephen Protomartire (Santo Stefano).

- Wood Dale, Illinois, United States

== In popular culture ==
The Breakfast at Tiffany's character Salvatore 'Sally' Tomato ("notorious mafia-notorious Mafia-führer") was "believed to have been born in Cefalu".

Some scenes of Giuseppe Tornatore's 1988 film Cinema Paradiso were filmed in Cefalù.

Some scenes from the second season of HBO series The White Lotus were filmed in Cefalù.

Some scenes from the 5th Indiana Jones movie Dial of Destiny were filmed in Cefalù.

== See also ==
- Arab-Norman Palermo and the Cathedral Churches of Cefalù and Monreale
