= SS Gallois =

Merchant steamer wrecked on Haisbro Sands of the Norfolk coast

History

- Name: Tynemouth (1917–1929); Lord Aberconway (1929–1931); Gallois (1931–1941)
- Namesake: Tynemouth; Lord Aberconway; French for Welsh
- Owner: Burnett Steamship Co Ltd, Newcastle (1917–1929); Tredegar Associated Collieries & Shipping Company Ltd, Cardiff (1929–1931); Établissements Odon de Lubersac, Rouen (1931–1940); British Government (1940-1941)
- Port of registry: Newcastle (1917–1929); Cardiff (1929–1931); Rouen (1931–1940); London (1940-1941)
- Builder: Wood, Skinner & Company Ltd., Newcastle upon Tyne
- Yard number: 197
- Launched: 16 August 1916
- Completed: January 1917
- Identification: UK official number 133590
- Fate: Wrecked on Haisbro Sands 6 August 1941 off Norfolk, England

General characteristics
- Tonnage: 2,684 gross register tons (GRT)
- Length: 321 ft (98 m)
- Beam: 43 ft (13 m)
- Draft: 17 ft (5.2 m)
- Installed power: Three cylinder triple-expansion engine
- Propulsion: Screw propeller
- Speed: 10.5 knots (19.4 km/h)
- Crew: Captain Peard and 30 crew
- Notes: French collier but technically she was under a British flag when wrecked.

SS Gallois was a French collier built in 1917 as Tynemouth and later Lord Aberconway. She was one of seven merchant vessels in Convoy FS 559 which became stranded and then wrecked on Haisbro Sands off the Norfolk coast on 6 August 1941 during the Second World War

== History ==
The Gallois was a steam merchant ship built in 1917 by Wood, Skinner & Company Ltd., Newcastle upon Tyne, England. She was 2,684 gross register tons (GRT) and 321 feet (98 m) long. Her yard number was No:197. She had been ordered by the Burnett Steam Ship Co. Ltd., (Burnett & Co) of Newcastle upon Tyne. Her original name was the Tynemouth. In 1929 she was sold to Tredegar Associated Collieries & Shipping Co. Ltd (A Capel & Co., Ltd.) of Cardiff, Wales. This company renamed her Lord Aberconway. In 1930 she was again sold to Établissenents Oden de Lubersac of Rouen, France, who renamed her Gallois. At the outbreak of the Second World War in September 1939, the ship was requisitioned by the French navy as an auxiliary ship. After the Fall of France in June 1940 Gallois escaped to Britain, was formally seized by the British government on 17 July on the Thames, and registered in London. She was then placed under the control of General de Gaulle's Free French Naval Forces.

== Final voyage ==
On 5 August 1941 Convoy FS 559 was proceeding down the East coast of Britain to London from Newcastle. The convoy was being escorted by two Royal Navy destroyers of the Rosyth escort-force. HMS Vimiera was a V-class destroyer built in 1917, whilst HMS Wolsey was of the Thorneycroft W class built a year later in 1918. Also helping with the escort duties were two armed trawlers, HMT Agate and HMT Arkwright. The night was drawing in as the convoy made its way down the coast and the weather was poor. There was a north-north west gale in full blow with rain. It was cold and visibility was poor. By the early hours and daylight of 6 August the convoy was enveloped in a thick sea mist making visibility very poor.

== Disaster ==
There are two accounts of what happened in the early hours of 6 August 1941. The first is that when Convoy FS 559 was being passed by a northbound convoy. They had come under attack by German E-boats. The standing instruction for ships in convoy under these circumstances was to scatter in groups, each with their own Royal Navy escort. HMT Agate led her group away and had either lost all notion of her position or the channel buoys had moved. The convoy had been unable to see the Haisborough Light vessel in the poor visibility which due to wartime restrictions was only illuminated for ten minutes when a convoy was due in the area. This had caused the lead escort difficulty in plotting their position. Soon seven of the vessels were stranded on the sands. The second version and the more likely cause of the ships running aground is that the bad weather conditions, and the strong westerly drift, and the fact that the exact position of the convoy was unavailable; the ships involved just ran aground.

== Rescue ==
The Cromer lifeboat had been alerted to the unfolding disaster out on Haisbro Sands at 8:00 am on 6 August. The Cromer Number 1 boat H F Bailey III put out at once with Coxswain Henry Blogg in command. The lifeboat arrived at Haisborough Sands at 9:40 am. Above the lifeboat, the crew of H F Bailey could hear the slow drone of RAF aircraft sent to patrol above the stricken convoy. As the lifeboat approached the sands, Blogg and his crew saw the seven big cargo vessels stranded with their backs broken. All that was visible was the ships' bridges as the sea broke across their decks. One of the escort destroyers had already begun rescue work using one of her whaler boats. The sea conditions the whaler came up against resulted in twelve of the seaman drowning by the time the lifeboat arrived. Before attending to the Gallois, the lifeboat took 16 men to safety from the SS Oxshott; running the lifeboat over the submerged deck of the ship to reach them behind the funnel Blogg then took the H F Bailey alongside the Gallois steadied by a line still attached to the Oxshott. The steamer was still just above water and her engines were still running. Blogg held the lifeboat alongside the ship, head to the wind, while some of the crew jumped aboard and others slid down ropes. One of the crew fell into the sea but was hauled out by one of the lifeboat men, unharmed. In total the H F Bailey rescued 31 men from the SS Gallois which with the crew from the Oxshott meant she was now carrying 47 rescued seamen.The lifeboat transferred the men to a nearby destroyer. Jack Davis, the second coxwain took command of the Harriott Dixon and the H F Bailey then returned to take off survivors from the Deerwood and the Paddy Hendley and having transferred these 41 to a destroyer, collected two dead bodies from HMT Arkwright before heading to Gt Yarmouth.

== Awards ==
Coxswain Henry Blogg and his crew were recognised for their bravery on the service to Convoy FS559 at an award ceremony held at the Regal Cinema in Hans Place, Cromer. The ceremony was attended by Vice Admiral Sir John Cunningham and a large audience. Ironically the proceedings were interrupted by the lifeboat being called out to service. After a short while it was announced that the call-out had been cancelled and the ceremony continued. Henry Blogg received a second bar to his RNLI Gold Medal and was also awarded the British Empire Medal. Jack Davis was awarded the RNLI silver medal, as was coxswain Charles Johnson of the Great Yarmouth and Gorleston lifeboat Louise Stephens. Several other members of the Cromer crew were awarded RNLI bronze medals.

Crew for the rescue of the SS Gallois
Name	Rank
Henry Blogg	Coxswain
J J Davis Snr	Second Coxswain
W T Davis	Bowman
H W Davis	Mechanic
W Davis	Assistant Mechanic
Henry "shrimp" Davies	Signaller
Edward W "Boy Primo" Allen	Signaller
J R Davis	crew
Robert "Skinback" Cox	crew
C Harrison	crew
L Harrison	crew
L Harrison	Stand-by Coxswain

== Position of the wreck of the SS Gallois today ==
- 52°54′N 01°43′E at a depth of 7 m (23 ft). on Haisborough Sands.

24.1 kilometres (15.0 mi) North of Hemsby
24.2 kilometres (15.0 mi) East-north east of North Walsham
27.9 kilometres (17.3 mi) North of Caister on Sea
28.2 kilometres (17.5 mi) East of Cromer
