= Convoy FS 559 =

Convoy FS 559, eventually comprising ten merchant ships, was a British convoy in World War II which departed Methil, Scotland on 4 August 1941, then Newcastle-upon-Tyne, for Southend, Essex. The protecting force comprised the destroyers HMS Vimiera and HMS Wolsey, supported by HMT Agate and HMT Arkwright. On the night of 6 August, six merchant ships from the convoy and escort Agate ran aground on the Haisborough Sands. The Cromer lifeboat H.F. Bailey was the first to arrive, and rescued 16 men from the SS Oxshott, 31 from the SS Gallois, 19 from the Deerwood and 22 from Betty Hindley. The Cromer second lifeboat Harriot Dixon and the Great Yarmouth and Gorleston lifeboat Louise Stephens between them rescued a further 31 men.

The lifeboatmen were recognised for their bravery at an award ceremony with Vice-admiral Sir John Cunningham. As well as awards by the RNLI to the crews, Henry Blogg was awarded the British Empire Medal the citation noting "By the courage and resolution of Coxswain Blogg and his crew eighty-eight lives were saved".
