= HMT Agate (1933) =

Anti-submarine ship converted from a fishing trawler before the Second World War

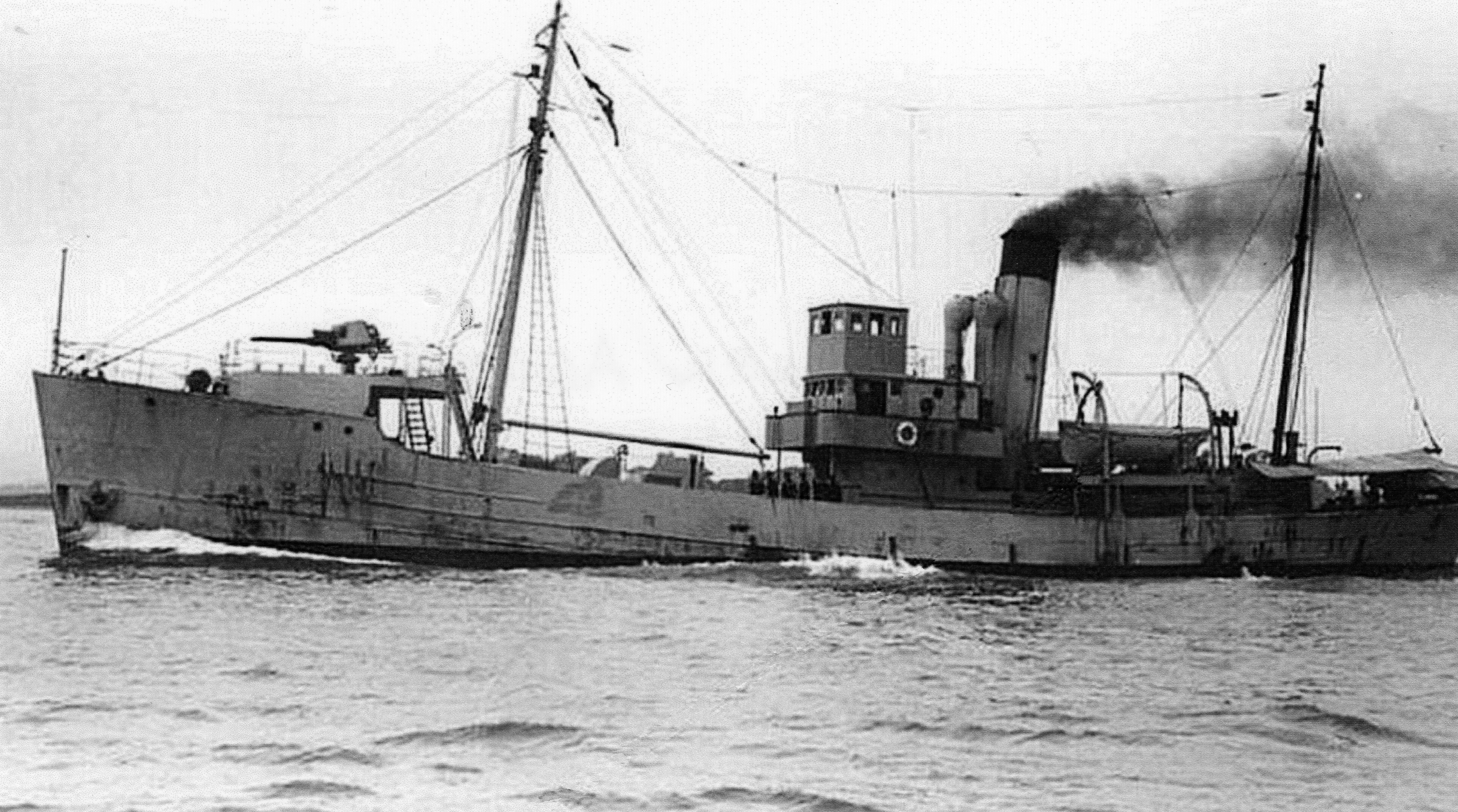
- HM Trawler Agate

History

United Kingdom
- Name: HM Trawler Agate
- Owner: Originally built for Boston Deep Sea Fishing and Ice Company Ltd
- Operator: Royal Navy
- Builder: Smiths Dock, South Bank-on-Tees, Middlesbrough
- Laid down: 1932
- Launched: 18 December 1933
- Acquired: By the Royal Navy in 1935
- Fate: Became stranded becoming a total Wreck on Haisborough Sands off the Norfolk coast, England
- Notes: Mercantile Type (First Group) Anti Submarine.

General characteristics
- Class & type: HM Trawler No: T87
- Tonnage: 433 gross register tons (GRT)
- Length: 157.25 ft (47.93 m)
- Beam: 26.5 ft (8.1 m)
- Draft: 13 ft (4.0 m)
- Installed power: 3 cylinder triple expansion supplied by Smiths Dock
- Speed: 12 knots (22 km/h)
- Crew: 16

HM Trawler Agate was purchased by the Royal Navy in 1935. She was modified from a trawler to be used to carry out anti-submarine work. In 1941 she was with the maintenance reserve at Rosyth, but in August was part of the Royal Navy's escort flotilla with convoy FS559 when she ran aground, becoming a total loss, on Haisborough Sands off the Norfolk coast on 6 August with a loss of sixteen crewmen.

== History ==
HM Trawler Agate was built in 1934 at Smiths Dock in Middlesbrough, England. She had been ordered by the Boston Deep Sea Fishing and Ice Company (B. A. Parkes) of Fleetwood, Lancashire. The trawler was originally called Mavis Rose. She was 433 gross register tons (GRT) and 157.25 feet (47.93 m) long, with a beam of 26.5 feet (8.1 m).

== Final voyage ==
On 5 August Convoy FS 559 was proceeding down the East coast of Britain to London from Newcastle. The convoy was being escorted by two Royal Navy destroyers of the Rosyth escort-force. HMS Vimiera was an old V-class destroyer built in 1917, whilst HMS Wolsey was a Thorneycroft W-class built a year later in 1918. Also helping with the escort duties were HM Trawler Agate and HM Trawler Arkwright. The night was drawing in as the convoy made its way down the coast and the weather was poor. There was a north-north-west gale in full blow with rain. It was cold and visibility was poor. By the early hours and daylight of 6 August, the convoy was enveloped in a thick sea mist, making visibility very poor. There are two accounts of what happened to HM Agate, but the most likely cause of event are as follows.

=== Run aground ===
The convoy had been unable to see the Haisborough light vessel due to the bad visibility, and in any case, due to wartime restrictions, the light was only illuminated for ten minutes when a convoy was due in the area. It is thought that due to the combination of the bad weather conditions, the strong westerly drift, and the fact that the exact position of the convoy was unavailable, HM Agate led seven of the convoy's ships onto the sands, where they ran aground. A further report from SS Oxshott describes Agate bearing down on her. The Oxshott was the first of the seven to run aground. The other vessels were the SS Afon Towy, SS Deerwood, SS Betty Hindley, SS Aberhill, SS Gallois and the SS Taara. Although the lifeboats from Cromer and Great Yarmouth and Gorleston rescued 137 men from the wrecked ships, 37 men perished, including 16 men from HM Trawler Agate. All three officers of Agate were lost; eight men survived, five of them picked up from a Carley raft by HM Trawler Basset.

== Position of the wreck of HM Trawler Agate today ==
- 52°53′N 01°43′E at a depth of 10 m (33 ft). on Haisborough Sands.

24.1 kilometres (15.0 mi) North of Hemsby
24.2 kilometres (15.0 mi) East-north east of North Walsham
27.9 kilometres (17.3 mi) North of Caister on Sea
28.2 kilometres (17.5 mi) East of Cromer
