= HMS Vortigern =

Destroyer of the Royal Navy

Coordinates: 53°05′N 01°22′E

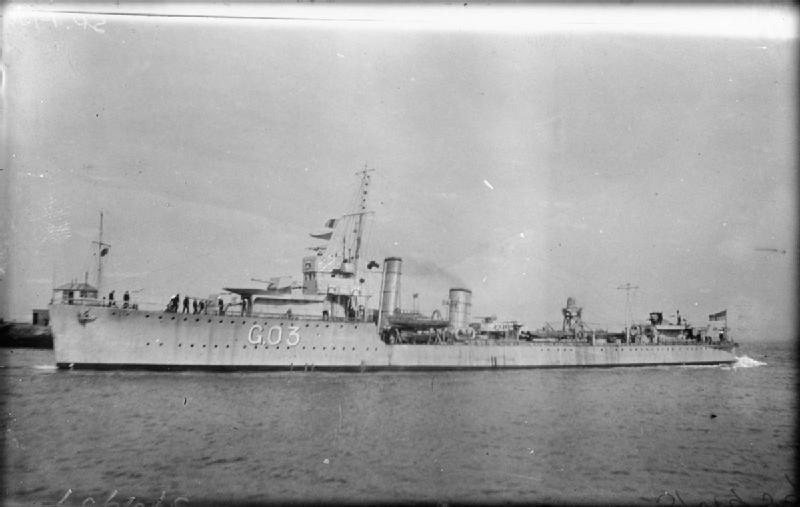
- Vortigern in the First World War

History

United Kingdom
- Name: HMS Vortigern
- Namesake: Vortigern
- Ordered: 1916-17 Programme Build (9th Order)
- Builder: J. Samuel White, Cowes, Isle of Wight
- Laid down: 17 January 1917
- Launched: 5 October 1917
- Commissioned: 21 January 1918
- Identification: Pennant number: D37
- Motto: Virtus a majoribus : 'Our valour is from our ancestors'
- Honours and awards: Atlantic 1939-40; North Sea 1941–42
- Fate: Sunk by E-boats on 15 March 1942
- Badge: On a Field Red, an ancient British Sword, hilt Gold, blade Silver

General characteristics
- Class & type: V-class destroyer
- Displacement: 1,272-1,339 tons
- Length: 300 ft (91.4 m) o/a; 312 ft (95.1 m) p/p
- Beam: 26 ft 9 in (8.2 m)
- Draught: 9 ft (2.7 m) standard; 11 ft 3 in (3.4 m) deep
- Propulsion: 3 White-Forster type Water-tube boilers; Brown-Curtis steam turbines; 2 shafts; 27,000 shp
- Speed: 34 kn
- Range: 320-370 tons oil; 3,500 nmi at 15 kn; 900 nmi at 32 kn
- Complement: 110
- Armament: 4 × QF 4 in Mk.V (102mm L/45), mount P Mk.I; 2 × QF 2 pdr Mk.II "pom-pom" (40 mm L/39) or; 1 × QF 12 pdr 20 cwt Mk.I (76 mm), mount HA Mk.II; 4 (2x2) tubes for 21 in torpedoes

HMS Vortigern was a V-class destroyer of the Royal Navy. She served in both World Wars, and was sunk in 1942.

== Design ==
The V-class destroyer was a development of the V-class leader, to meet a requirement for larger destroyers that would have superior seakeeping and armament to the existing R-class, which could match rumoured new large German destroyers.

Vortigern was 312 feet (95.1 m) long overall and 300 feet (91.4 m) between perpendiculars, with a beam of 26 feet 6 inches (8.08 m) and a draught of between 10 feet 9 inches (3.28 m) and 11 feet 11 1/2 inches (3.64 m) depending on load. Displacement was 1,090 long tons (1,110 t) standard, and 1,480–1,490 long tons (1,500–1,510 t) full load. Three oil-fed White-Forster water-tube boilers fed steam at 250 psi (1,700 kPa) to two sets of Brown-Curtis geared impulse steam turbines which developed 27,000 shaft horsepower (20,000 kW), driving two screws for a maximum designed speed of 34 knots (63 km/h; 39 mph). The ship carried a maximum of 368 long tons (374 t) oil giving a range of 1,000 nmi (1,900 km; 1,200 mi) at maximum speed and 3,500 nmi (6,500 km; 4,000 mi) at 15 knots (28 km/h; 17 mph).

As built, Vortigern's main gun armament consisted of four 4-inch Mk V QF guns in four single mounts on the ship's centreline. These were disposed as two forward and two aft in superimposed firing positions. A single QF 3-inch (76 mm) 20 cwt (Note: "Cwt" is the abbreviation for hundredweight, 20 cwt referring to the weight of the gun.) anti-aircraft gun (which was also used to illuminate surface targets with star shells) was mounted aft of the second funnel. Aft of the 3-inch gun, four 21-inch (533 mm) torpedo tubes were mounted in two twin mounts on the centreline. The ship had a crew of 134 officers and ratings.

In 1918, Vortigern was modified so that she could be used for minelaying. When used for this role, the aft 4-inch gun and one set of torpedo tubes were removed, allowing 60 mines to be carried. Between the wars, the 3-inch gun was replaced by a 2-pounder "pom-pom" autocannon, and the forward sets of torpedo tubes was replaced by a triple mount, giving an armament of five torpedo tubes.

== Construction and commissioning ==
Vortigern was one of two destroyers ordered from J. Samuel White, under the Ninth War Construction Programme, as part of an overall purchase of 25 V-class destroyers ordered from 11 shipyards under that programme in July and August 1916. Vortigern was laid down at White's Cowes, Isle of Wight on 17 January 1917 and was launched on 15 October that year, completing on 25 January 1918. She has been the only ship of the Royal Navy so far to be named HMS Vortigern, after Vortigern, an early British ruler.

== Wartime and interwar service ==
Vortigern served throughout the remaining months of the war as part of the 11th Destroyer Flotilla.

After the end of the First World War, Britain sent a force of light cruisers and destroyers under the command of Rear Admiral Edwyn Alexander-Sinclair to the Baltic Sea with orders to "support British policy" in the region and to deliver arms to the newly independent Baltic countries of Estonia, Latvia and Lithuania. The end of December 1918 saw Vortigern in the Baltic as part of this force, and on 26 December, she was part of a force that sortied from Reval when the Bolshevik destroyer Spartak shelled islands in the approach to Reval. On seeing the British ships, Spartak turned away for Kronstadt, but ran aground and was captured by the British force. The next day, Vortigern was ordered to take part in a search for another Bolshevik destroyer which had been sighted overnight (this was the Avtroil, which was searching for the missing Spartak). Avtroil ended up surrounded by British ships, and with no hope of escape, surrendered, with a prize crew from Vortigern taking Avtroil into Reval. The two captured destroyers were given to Estonia, and were renamed Wambola and Lennuk. The British force returned home in January 1919.

When the 11th Flotilla was disbanded in March 1919, Vortigern joined the 1st Destroyer Flotilla. Vortigern was again deployed to the Baltic as part of the 1st Flotilla in July–August 1919 and October–December 1919. The destroyer re-commissioned with a new crew at Portsmouth on 10 December 1920, continuing to serve with the 1st Flotilla, operating in Irish waters in March–May 1921. In 1921, the destroyer force was again reorganised around smaller flotillas comprising eight destroyers and a leader. Vortigern was assigned to a reduced 1st Flotilla. In September 1922, the Chanak crisis threatened war between Britain and Turkey, the 1st Destroyer Flotilla was ordered to the Mediterranean as part of a large-scale reinforcement of British forces off Turkey, with Vortigern leaving Portsmouth on 26 September and arriving off Çanakkale on 4 October. The flotilla remained in the Eastern Mediterranean until March 1923.

In 1925, the Mediterranean-based 5th Destroyer Flotilla and the 1st Flotilla exchanged designations, with Vortigern joining the 5th Flotilla, now part of the Atlantic Fleet after a refit in Portsmouth. On 20 August 1926, Vortigern paid off into reserve while her boiler tubes were replaced at Portsmouth, with her crew recommissioning the destroyer Vivien which replaced Vortigern in the 5th Flotilla. Vortigern recommissioned back into the 5th Flotilla on the completion of her boiler repairs on 9 November 1926, with her crew returning from Vivien. On 6 January 1927, Vortigern and Vancouver escorted the battlecruiser Renown, carrying the Duke and Duchess of York on the first part of the Royal's state visit to Australia and New Zealand. The destroyer underwent repairs on her turbines at Portsmouth from 1 October 1928 to 9 January 1929, exchanging her crew with that of the destroyer Whitley on 30 November 1928. In June 1930, a fire broke out on the island of Grassholm, off Pembrokeshire, Wales, which threatened the large colony of Gannets on the island. Shore parties from Vortigern, Velox and Wallace were landed to fight the fires, with a trench being dug to protect the Gannet colony. On 12 January 1934, Vortigern, together with the destroyer Sabre, a tug and the Weymouth lifeboat, were sent to search off the coast of Dorset for the source of apparent distress flares that had been sighted off Portland Bill. The search was called off once it was realised that the alleged distress flares were in fact parachute flares that has been dropped by a RAF flying boat. On 31 January 1934, Vortigern and the destroyer Warwick collided near Gibraltar during exercises. Both ships sustained minor damage.

Vortigern was decommissioned in November 1934, with the ship going into reserve at Portsmouth, being replaced in the 5th Flotilla by Encounter. On 9 March 1937, one of the destroyer's 4-inch guns was being taken off its mounting for examination when the gun was dropped, killing a dockyard worker. Vortigern was briefly brought out into full service in September 1938 to serve as a minelaying destroyer as a result of the Munich crisis, but was quickly returned to reserve. The ship was recommissioned on 15 June 1939, joining the 17th Destroyer Flotilla. Vortigern took part in the August Fleet Review of the ships of the reserve by HM King George VI.

== Second World War ==
On 22 August 1939, Vortigern left Portsmouth for Gibraltar, joining the 13th Destroyer Flotilla. On 13 January, she and Velox escorted the outbound convoy OG 14F to Gibraltar. On their arrival on 15 January, both destroyers were detached to join the flotilla. Vortigern spent the period between February and June escorting convoys between Britain and Gibraltar.

On 2 July 1940, Vortigern was attacked by a submarine, the torpedo striking the destroyer's stem, but it did not explode immediately, and sank away from the ship before exploding, with Vortigern undamaged. On 3 July she was present at the attack on the French fleet at Mers-el-Kébir (Operation Catapult). On 6 July she formed part of the escort with the ships of the 13th and 8th Destroyer Flotillas for the battlecruiser HMS Hood, the battleship HMS Valiant, the aircraft carrier HMS Ark Royal and the cruisers HMS Arethusa and Enterprise for the air attacks on the French battleship Dunkerque. Vortigern then joined the destroyers HMS Faulknor, Foxhound, Fearless, Forester, Escort, Douglas, Active, Velox and Wrestler on 8 July as they screened the capital ships preparing for air attacks from HMS Ark Royal on Italian targets on Cagliari. The operation was abandoned after the force came under heavy air attack, and Vortigern took passage to Britain on 12 July.

She deployed in August on convoy defence duties in Home waters, covering convoys sailing in the North Western Approaches to and from the Clyde. She was taken in hand in September for a refit, and to be converted into a Short Range Escort. The work lasted until November, and after completing trials Vortigern joined the 12th Destroyer Flotilla based at Rosyth, and deployed to escort convoys in the North Sea. On 9 December whilst escorting one convoy, Vortigern came under attack by a German seaplane off Aldeburgh. The destroyer continued her patrols and convoy escort duties all throughout 1941 and into 1942.

== Sinking ==
Vortigern was sunk off Cromer on 15 March 1942, whilst defending a coastal convoy against attack by E-boats. She was torpedoed by the E-boat S104, and sank with the loss of 110 lives. Only 14 survivors were rescued. Eleven bodies were recovered from the sea by the Cromer lifeboat H F Bailey III. The wrecksite is designated as a Protected Place under the Protection of Military Remains Act 1986. There are twelve war graves in Lowestoft, and one in the New Cromer town cemeteries from HMS Vortigern.

== Bibliography ==
- Admiralty War Diary July 1940 (PDF). Admiralty. July 1940 – via Naval Historical Branch.
- Bennett, Geoffrey (2002). Freeing the Baltic. Birlinn. ISBN 1-84341-001-X.
- Campbell, N. J. M. (1980). "Great Britain (including Empire Forces)". In Chesneau, Roger (ed.). Conway's All the World's Fighting Ships 1922–1946. Conway Maritime Press. pp. 2–85. ISBN 0-85177-146-7.
- Campbell, John (1985). Naval Weapons of World War II. Naval Institute Press. ISBN 0-87021-459-4.
- Colledge, J. J.; Warlow, Ben (2006) [1969]. Ships of the Royal Navy: The Complete Record of All Fighting Ships of the Royal Navy from the 15th Century to the Present (3rd Rev ed.). London: Chatham Publishing. ISBN 978-1-86176-281-8. OCLC 67375475.
- Cocker, Maurice (1981). Destroyers of the Royal Navy, 1893–1981. Ian Allan. ISBN 0-7110-1075-7.
- Dunn, Steve R. (2020). Battle in the Baltic: The Royal Navy and the Fight to Save Estonia & Latvia 1918–20. Seaforth Publishing. ISBN 978-1-5267-4273-5.
- English, John (2019). Grand Fleet Destroyers: Part I: Flotilla Leaders and 'V/W' Class Destroyers. World Ship Society. ISBN 978-0-9650769-8-4.
- Friedman, Norman (2009). British Destroyers From Earliest Days to the Second World War. Naval Institute Press. ISBN 978-1-59114-081-8.
- Halpern, Paul, ed. (2011). The Mediterranean Fleet, 1919–1929. Publications of the Navy Records Society. Vol. 158. Ashgate. ISBN 978-1-4094-2756-8.
- Lenton, H. T. (1970). British Fleet and Escort Destroyers: Volume One. Macdonald & Co. ISBN 0-356-02950-6.
- Lenton, H. T. (1998). British & Empire Warships of the Second World War. Naval Institute Press. ISBN 1-55750-048-7.
- Manning, T. D.; Walker, C. F. (1959). British Warship Names. Putnam.
- March, Edgar J. (1966). British Destroyers: A History of Development, 1892–1953; Drawn by Admiralty Permission From Official Records & Returns, Ships' Covers & Building Plans. Seeley Service. OCLC 164893555.
- Preston, Antony (1985). "Great Britain and Empire Forces". In Gray, Randal (ed.). Conway's All the World's Fighting Ships 1906–1921. Naval Institute Press. pp. 1–104. ISBN 0-85177-245-5.
- Preston, Antony (1971). 'V & W' Class Destroyers 1917–1945. Macdonald. OCLC 464542895.
- Raven, Alan & Roberts, John (1979). 'V' and 'W' Class Destroyers. Man o'War. Vol. 2. London: Arms & Armour. ISBN 0-85368-233-X.
- Rohwer, Jürgen (2005). Chronology of the War at Sea 1939–1945: The Naval History of World War Two (Third Revised ed.). Naval Institute Press. ISBN 1-59114-119-2.
- Smith, Peter C. (2005). Into the Minefields: British Destroyer Minelaying 1916–1960. Pen & Sword Maritime. ISBN 1-84415-271-5.
- Whinney, Bob (2000). The U-boat Peril: A Fight for Survival. Cassell. ISBN 0-304-35132-6.
- Whitley, M. J. (2000). Destroyers of World War Two: An International Encyclopedia. Cassell & Co. ISBN 1-85409-521-8.
