= SS Cantabria (1919) =

Spanish cargo ship sunk in a military action of the Spanish Civil War

- Cantabria sinking, photographed from the Nationalist cruiser Nadir

History

Spain
- Name: 1919: War Chief; 1919: Alfonso Pérez; 1937: Cantabria
- Owner: 1919: UK Shipping Controller; 1919: AF Pérez; 1938: A Zubizarreta
- Operator: 1919: Raeburn & Vérel, Glasgow; 1938: Dept de Nav, Santander
- Port of registry: Santander
- Builder: J Coughlan & Sons, Vancouver
- Launched: 19 August 1918
- Completed: February 1919
- Identification: code letters HBNP (until 1933); call sign EAAL (by 1934)
- Fate: sunk by gunfire, 2 November 1938

General characteristics
- Tonnage: 5,743 GRT, 4,180 NRT
- Length: 410.5 ft (125.1 m)
- Beam: 54.1 ft (16.5 m)
- Depth: 27.5 ft (8.4 m)
- Decks: 2
- Installed power: by 1926: 532 NHP
- Propulsion: 1919: steam turbine; by 1926: triple-expansion engine
- Speed: 8–10 knots (15–19 km/h)
- Crew: 33

SS Cantabria was a Spanish-owned cargo steamship that was built in 1919 in Canada and sunk in 1938 in a naval action in the Spanish Civil War in the North Sea. She was built as War Chief, renamed Alfonso Pérez shortly after she was built, and renamed Cantabria during the Spanish Civil War.

Cantabria's wreck is off the coast of Norfolk, 12 miles ENE of Cromer. She was shelled by the Spanish Nationalist auxiliary cruiser Nadir.

== Building and career ==
J Coughlan & Sons of Vancouver, British Columbia, Canada built the ship as War Chief for the UK Shipping Controller. She was launched in 19 August 1918 and completed in February 1919. Her registered length was 410.5 ft (125.1 m), her beam was 54.1 ft (16.5 m) and her depth was 27.5 ft (8.4 m). Her tonnages were 5,743 GRT and 4,180 NRT. She had a single screw, and her original engine was a steam turbine. By 1926 this had been replaced with a three-cylinder triple-expansion steam engine that was rated at 532 NHP.

The Shipping Controller initially appointed Raeburn and Vérel of Glasgow to manage War Chief, but by mid-1919 had sold her to AF Pérez, who renamed her Alfonso Pérez and registered her in Santander. Her code letters were HBNP. By 1926 she was equipped for wireless telegraphy, and by 1934 her call sign was EAAL.

In the Asturian miners' strike of 1934 she was used as a prison ship. In 1937 the Departamento de Navegación of Santander requisitioned her for the Republican government and renamed her Cantabria. The Republican authorities used her as a prison ship in Santander.

== Sinking ==
By 1938 Cantabria was charter to a British company called the Mid-Atlantic Shipping Company, based in London. She was not engaged in Spanish trade. She was in passage in ballast from the River Thames to Immingham, whence she was to sail for Leningrad under Captain Manuel Argüelles. Aboard were 33 crew and eight passengers, of whom five were children and three women. The passengers included Argüelles' wife Trinidad, their son Ramon, aged six, their daughter Begoña, aged eight, and another child, aged three.

=== Auxiliary cruiser Nadir ===
Spanish Nationalist auxiliary cruiser Nadir in camouflage

Nadir was a 2,497 GRT auxiliary cruiser of the Spanish Nationalist navy, armed with a 120 mm (4.7 in) main gun, two 105 mm (4 in) guns and two 47 mm (2 in) anti-aircraft guns. She was converted from the merchant ship Ciudad de Valencia, and took part in the blockade of the Bay of Biscay in 1937. The Nationalists had renamed her to deceive the Spanish Republican Navy about the real number of commerce raiders at sea. Her targets were Republican cargo ships operating from ports in northern Europe. She had been launched on 18 October 1930 at the shipyard Unión Naval de Levante as Infante D. Gonzalo, owned by the Compañía Transmediterránea. The Nationalist government requisitioned her on 30 October 1936.

=== Attack ===
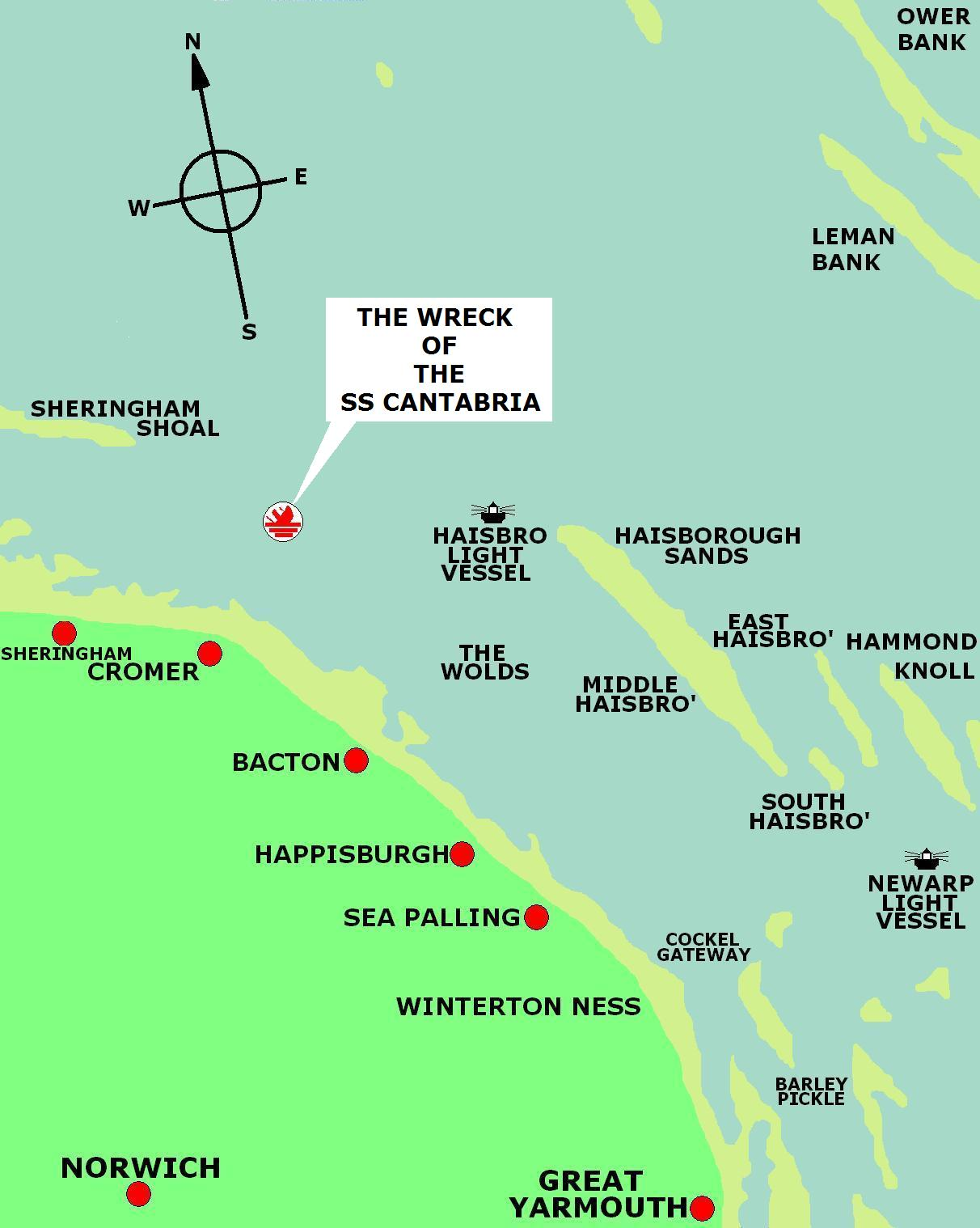
Map showing where Nadir sank Cantabria

Nazi Germany allowed Spanish Nationalist ships to use the port of Emden as a base from which to raid Spanish Republican shipping in the North Sea and the English Channel. At about 11.30 am on 2 November, Argüelles was concerned that a ship was shadowing Cantabria. He changed course a degree or two to see if the other ship followed suit. It did. His officers studied the following ship with binoculars. She looked like an ordinary passenger ship of about 1,500 GRT.

But the ship following Cantabria was in fact Nadir. Argüelles again changed course, now heading for the Norfolk coast. Nadir followed and increased speed. In the afternoon Cantabria's crew then saw Nadir's crew raise the Spanish Nationalist flag. At the same time Nadir unmasked her guns and signalled ordering Cantabria "Heave to or I fire". The cruiser then opened fire.

The incident was in international waters, outside British territorial waters, but near enough to the coast to be seen from shore. According to the statement by Argüelles, he refused to stop Cantabria after Nadir fired a shot across her bows. Nearby fishing boats intervened by heading towards Nadir sounding their sirens. This persuaded the cruiser to change course and break off her attack. The fishing boats, satisfied that they had ended the attack, continued on their way.

However, after the fishing boats had gone, Nadir returned and opened fire on Cantabria. A shell struck the bridge, destroying it. The raider circled Cantabria firing shells and raking her with machine-gun fire. A shell penetrated the engine room, rendering Cantabria powerless.

Cantabria's wireless telegraph operator had been sending signals that she was "being shelled by unknown vessel". After her bridge had been destroyed and her engine room disabled he transmitted an SOS signal. He gave Cantabria's position as 8½ miles southeast of Haisbro Light Ship.

=== Rescue ===
It was now nearly dark and at 5pm the Cromer Lifeboat H F Bailey with coxswain Henry Blogg at the helm was launched to rescue Cantabria's crew and passengers. Before H F Bailey arrived, fire spread through the ship. Two boats were lowered and some of the crew and passengers abandoned ship. Captain Argüelles, his wife and children and the second steward, Joaquin Vallego, remained aboard fearing what their fate would be if they surrendered to the insurgents aboard Nadir. With the boats now lowered, Nadir ceased fire.

Two cargo ships saw the attack: the British Monkwood and a Norwegian ship, but they did not attempt a rescue, fearing the reaction of Nadir, which was still in international waters. Monkwood later sent a report to the naval authorities, who sent naval units to the position to ensure that no hostile action would be taken inside British territorial waters. Another British merchant ship, Pattersonian, approached in response to Cantabria's SOS. Captain Blackmore of Pattersonian had seen Nadir head towards the lifeboat, and steered his ship across the attacker's course, preventing Nadir from reaching the lifeboat. Pattersonian rescued eleven crew from Cantabria's lifeboats. Nadir captured 20 crew in the second lifeboat. The House of Lords judged this to be unlawful interference in British shipping, as Nadir obstructed the legal duty of rescuing seamen.

It was now dark and no more shots were being fired. H F Bailey arrived at the scene at 6.30 pm. Argüelles signalled the lifeboat with a torch, and it pulled along the starboard side of Cantabria, which was heavily listing. A line was thrown, and the children and Argüelles' wife were handed down to the lifeboat, followed by the steward and Argüelles. When the rescue was complete, Cantabria suddenly heeled over, damaging the lifeboat's stanchions. H F Bailey hastily got clear of Cantabria, which sank soon after at position 53°1′58″N 1°31′57″E. At least one sailor, Juan Gil, was lost with the vessel. Other sources report the loss of four crew members.

== Aftermath ==
H F Bailey returned to Cromer, arriving at 8.15pm. Argüelles, his family and the steward were taken to the Red Lion Hotel, and Pattersonian took the other 11 rescued crewmen to Great Yarmouth. The BBC reported an account of the incident, along with a warning to shipping, giving the sunken Cantabria's position. British newspapers carried the story as headline news, but many of the crew at Yarmouth refused to be photographed, fearing Nationalist reprisals. Questions about the incident were asked in both Houses of Parliament.

SS Cantabria
Rescued Persons
| By H F Bailey | By Pattersonian | Captured by Nadir |
|---|---|---|
| Capt. Manuel Argüelles | José López (English speaking) | 24 crew |
| Trinidad Argüelles | Pedro García | Eduardo Collade (wireless operator) |
| Ramón Argüelles (aged 6) | Francisco Pou | Wife of Eduardo Collade |
| Begoña Argüelles (aged 8) | Francisco García | 2 children of Eduardo Collade |
| Joaquín Vallego | Fernando Manciro | |
| | Rafael Leou | |
| | Hilaro Trilear | |
| | Santiago Glorente | |
| | Román Amorebieta | |
| | Armando Abad | |
| | Manuel Figuciras | |

== Gestapo involvement ==
Two weeks after the sinking of Cantabria, Danish police released information that shed new light on the recent confrontation that proved that it had been no coincidence that Nadir had intercepted Cantabria. For some time, the Danish police had been interested in the Copenhagen correspondents for a German newspaper, one of whom was Horst von Pflugk-Harttung. He worked for the Berliner Börsen-Zeitung, which was an organ of the Ministry of the Reichswehr. Danish police arrested Harttung and eight other Germans living in Denmark, along with three Danes, and charged them with operating as spies in Copenhagen.

Danish police proved that the accused had all been trained at Gestapo spy schools and had operated secret broadcasting stations, as well as engaging in nautical and hydrographical research. Between them they had drawn up maps and charts, graphs and complex mathematical tables of data. They communicated by complex codes, which they changed frequently. The outlay for so extensive an operation could be justified only as part of Third Reich preparation for war. The spy ring used the shadowing and sinking of Cantabria to demonstrate the complicated subversion mechanism that the Gestapo was developing. The sinking had been formulated by the Spanish insurgents, backed by their allies, as a warning to Britain. Franco was warning the British government that, unless she proved amenable, worse was to come. The Danish police investigation established that the attack was planned by Nazi Germany. As said above, Nadir and her sister ship Ciudad de Alicante used Emden as a supply base.

=== Horst von Pflugk-Harttung ===
Horst von Pflugk-Harttung was a German spy, who along with his brother Heinz, had previously been charged in Berlin for the assassination of the Socialist leaders, Karl Liebknecht and Rosa Luxemburg. Both men were acquitted but evidently many thought them guilty. Heinz was later killed in an accidental explosion. After Horst von Pflugk-Harttung's trial in Denmark, he was sentenced to only a year and a half in prison, and was released after a few months after German government pressure. He became a leading German intelligence chief in Denmark.

== 2006 tribute ==
Manuel Argüelles and his wife Trinidad later emigrated with their children to Mexico. In 2006, when the new Henry Blogg lifeboat museum was opened, Argüelles' son Ramón and daughter Begoña made a visit to pay tribute to Henry Blogg and his crew.

== Bibliography ==
- Collomb, Joseph (1939). "5: Franco's Fifth Column". Armies of Spies. New York: Macmillan Inc.
- Garcia Duran, Juan (1985). La guerra civil española: Fuentes (in Spanish). Editorial Crítica. ISBN 9788474232660.
- Heaton, Paul M (1985). Welsh Blockade Runners in the Spanish Civil War. Starling Press. ISBN 0-9507714-5-7.
- Jolly, C (2002). Henry Blogg, the Greatest of the Lifeboatmen (New ed.). Poppyland Publishing. p. 158. ISBN 0-946148-59-7.
- Lloyd's Register of Shipping. Vol. I–Steamers. London: Lloyd's Register of Shipping. 1919 – via Internet Archive.
- Lloyd's Register of Shipping. Vol. I–Steamers & Motorships. London: Lloyd's Register of Shipping. 1926 – via Internet Archive.
- Lloyd's Register of Shipping (PDF). Vol. I–Steamers & Motorships. London: Lloyd's Register of Shipping. 1934 – via Southampton City Council.
- Lloyd's Register of Shipping (PDF). Vol. I–Steamers & Motorships. London: Lloyd's Register of Shipping. 1937 – via Southampton City Council.
- Lloyd's Register of Shipping (PDF). Vol. I–Steamers & Motorships. London: Lloyd's Register of Shipping. 1938 – via Southampton City Council.
- Tikus, Ayer. The Ship-Wrecks off North Norfolk. Ayer Tikus Publications.
