= RNLB H F Bailey (ON 777) =

UK lifeboat

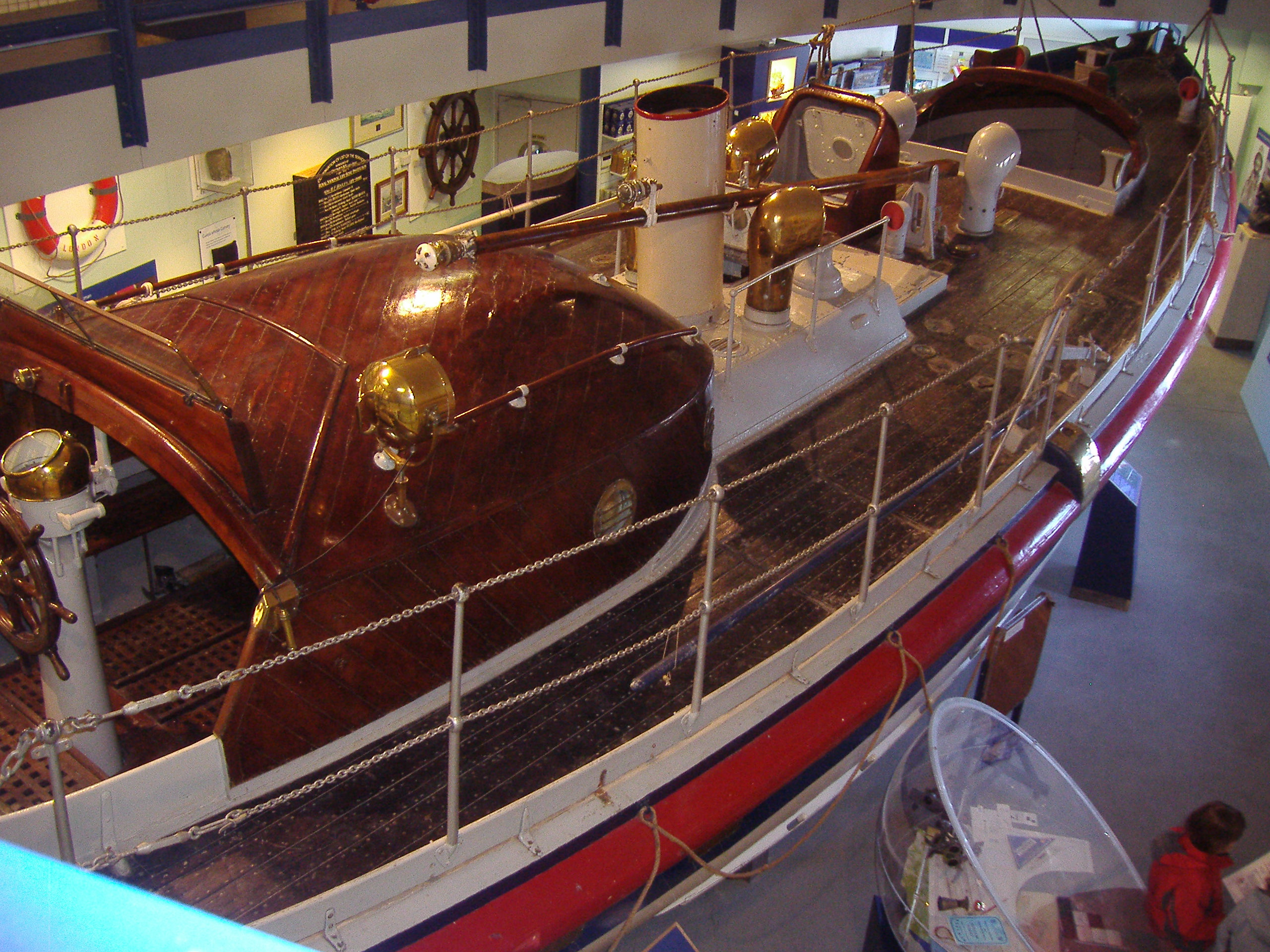
- HF Bailey III in the Henry Blogg Museum, Cromer, 2007

History

British RNLI Flag
- Owner: Royal National Lifeboat Institution (RNLI)
- Builder: Groves and Guttridge Ltd, Isle of Wight
- Official Number: ON 777
- Donor: Legacy of Henry Francis Bailey, Brockenhurst, Hampshire
- Station: Cromer
- Cost: £7,307 14s 0d
- Christened: 27 August 1937
- In service: 1935
- Fate: On display at the Henry Blogg Museum in Cromer

General characteristics
- Type: Watson-class lifeboat
- Tonnage: 18.78 gross tonnage
- Length: 31 ft 9 in (9.68 m) overall
- Draught: 9 ft 5 in (2.87 m)
- Installed power: 2x Weyburn CE4 four-cylinder Diesel engines, 40 bhp (30 kW) each
- Speed: 8 knots (15 km/h)
- Complement: 12 crew plus 95 rescues

RNLB H F Bailey (ON 777) is the most famous Royal National Lifeboat Institution (RNLI) lifeboat to have operated from Cromer. She was used by Coxswain Henry Blogg to perform many of his most famous lifesaving exploits. The lifeboat was on station for ten years between 1935 and 1945. She is now part of the National Historic Fleet and has been preserved in the RNLI Henry Blogg Museum in Cromer.

It was the fourth and last motor-powered Cromer lifeboat called H F Bailey after the donor, Mr Henry Francis Bailey, a London merchant who had been born in Norfolk and had died in 1916.

== Construction ==
H F Bailey was built at the yard of Groves and Guttridge Ltd on the Isle of Wight. Her hull is constructed using double diagonal planking of Honduras mahogany on a framework of teak ribs and beams, with the stem and stern posts and her keel of English oak. The stern and stem posts are grown to the required shape to give the lifeboat its strength and sturdiness. She is 46 feet (14 m) long and 12 feet 9 inches (3.89 m) wide. The hull is divided into seven watertight compartments, of which the engine room is one. The hull is fitted with 142 mahogany air cases, each individually made to fit into its allocated position in the hull. Her equipment included the latest innovations of the time which included a line throwing gun and an electric searchlight.

== Service ==
H F Bailey began service as Cromer's No1 lifeboat on 12 December 1935. She was launched 154 times and saved 448 lives at Cromer before taken out of service in 1945.

In October 1941 the lifeboat launched in aid of SS English Trader which had run aground on Hammond's Knoll in a gale. During the difficult rescue, H F Bailey rolled onto her side, throwing five of her crew in the water including Blogg, and "Shrimp" Davies All the crew were recovered but Edward Walter Allen, who had spent 25 minutes in the water later died. The crew exhausted by their attempts to get the ship's crew off, the H F Bailey made for Great Yarmouth. The next day in better weather, they recovered 44 survivors from the English Trader.

HF Bailey went on to serve at Helvick Head Lifeboat Station in County Waterford, Ireland from 1946 until 1969 when the station was closed. Following the closure the boat was sold in 1973 and spent time on display at Thorpe Water Sport Park, Surrey before Sir Peter Cadbury bought her and presented her to the RNLI Henry Blogg Museum in 1991. She was transferred to the RNLI Heritage Trust in 2003.

== Rescues and service ==
Rescues by H F Bailey (ON 777)
Date	Casualty	Lives saved
26 March 1936	Steamship Boree of Caen, landed 7 from steamship Cadeuceus	
2 April 1936	Fishing boat Little Madge of Sheringham, in tow of lifeboat J C Madge of Sheringham and fishing boats John Roberts and White Rose of Cromer, stood by boats	
20 April 1936	Barge Will Everard of London, stood by vessel	
7–11 August 1936	Steamship San Francisco of Le Havre, rendered assistance	
16–18 November 1936	Steamship Nesttun of Tvedestrand, rendered assistance	
18 November 1936	Steam drifter Pitagaveny of Banff, saved	10
19 November 1936	Steamship Yew Forest of Glasgow, took out a doctor	
19 November 1936	Steamship Lindisfarne of Newcastle on Tyne, rendered assistance	
9 November 1937	Spritsail barge Hibernia of London	3
10 February 1938	Fishing boat Urgent of Cromer, stood by boat	
30 May 1938	Fishing boat G V H of Great Yarmouth, saved boat	2
7 August 1938	Motor vessel John M of London, stood by vessel	
2 November 1938	Steamship Cantabria of Santander, saved	5
27 December 1938	Steamship Otto H of Pori, rendered assistance	
18 June 1939	Rowing boat of Cromer, Landed 5	
9 October 1939	Steamship Mount Ida of Piraeus, saved	29
1 December 1939	Steamship Realf of Moss, landed 32 and 10 naval ratings from Santa Gata	
8 December 1939	Steamship Corea of Goole, saved	7
12 December 1939	Steamship Corbrook of London, stood by vessel	
21 December 1939	Motor vessel Dosinia of London, assisted to save vessel	51
9 January 1940	Steamship Upminster of London, stood by vessel	
11 January 1940	Steamship Traviata of Genoa, landed 30 and saved	1
11 January 1940	HMT Holyrood, gave help	
12 January 1940	Light Vessel No 58, saved a ship's boat	3
18 January 1940	Steamship Asteria of Piraeus, saved	11
18 January 1940	Light Vessel No 58, saved a ship's boat	4
30 January 1940	Steam trawler Pelton of Grimsby, gave help	
27 August 1940	Aircraft, salvaged wreckage and gear	
3 October 1940	MV Actuosity of London, saved	8
15 November 1940	HMT Dungeness, saved	11
25 November 1940	HMT Dungeness, salvaged gear	
7 December 1940	Steamship Royston of Newcastle on Tyne, stood by	
12 December 1940	Steamship Royston of Newcastle on Tyne, gave help	
15 January 1941	Steamship Lieutenant Robert Mory of Belfast, landed 19 and gave help	
25 January 1941	Steamship Meriones of Liverpool, saved	101
8 March 1941	Boat from steamship Corduff of London, saved	13
8 March 1941	Steamship Kenton of Newcastle, saved two boats	
13 March 1941	Steamship Essex Lance of London, gave help	
14 March 1941	Steamship Essex Lance of London, gave help	
26 March 1941	Steamship Kentwood of London, stood by	
24 July 1941	Aircraft, saved dinghy and picked up a body	
6 August 1941	(Convoy FS 559 (Note: In total six merchant ships from the convoy and an escort HMT Agate ran aground. The second Cromer boat Harriot Dixon and the Louise Stephens from Gt Yarmouth and Gorleston boat also participated in the rescue)) Steamship Oxshott of London, saved	16
6 August 1941	(Convoy FS 559) Steamship SS Gallois of Rouen, saved	31
6 August 1941	(Convoy FS 559) Steamship Deerwood of London, saved	19
6 August 1941	(Convoy FS 559) Steamship Betty Hindley, saved	22
15 September	Motor vessel Pontfield of Newcastle, gave help	
23 September 1941	Steamship J B Paddon of London, landed an injured man	
Between Sept 17 – 6 Nov	Steamship Teddington of London, gave help on 22 occasions	
16 October 1941	British aircraft, landed a body	
26 October 1941	Steamship English Trader of London, saved (Note: Henry Blogg received a RNLI Silver Medal for this rescue. The crew received Bronze medals. That of signalman Walter Allen was awarded posthumously)	44
29 January 1942	Aeroplane dinghy seven miles north of Cley next the Sea, saved	1
2 February 1942	Motor vessel Sedulity of London, landed an injured man	
15 March 1942	HMS Vortigern, picked up 11 bodies after torpedo attack	
11 April 1942	British aeroplane, landed 6	
25 May 1942	Yacht Betty of Gorleston, gave help	
20 July 1942	Aeroplane, gave help	
18 November 1942	Motor fishing boat Silver Queen of Lowestoft, saved vessel	2
12 March 1943	Barrage balloon, salvaged balloon	
26 July 1943	Wellington Bomber aeroplane, saved	5
20 June 1944	Aeroplane, salvaged wreckage	
29 July 1944	Aeroplane, salvaged gear	
7–10 December 1944	Steamship Samnethy of London, saved	
4 February 1945	Motor vessel Valder of Hartlepool, gave help	

== Gallery ==
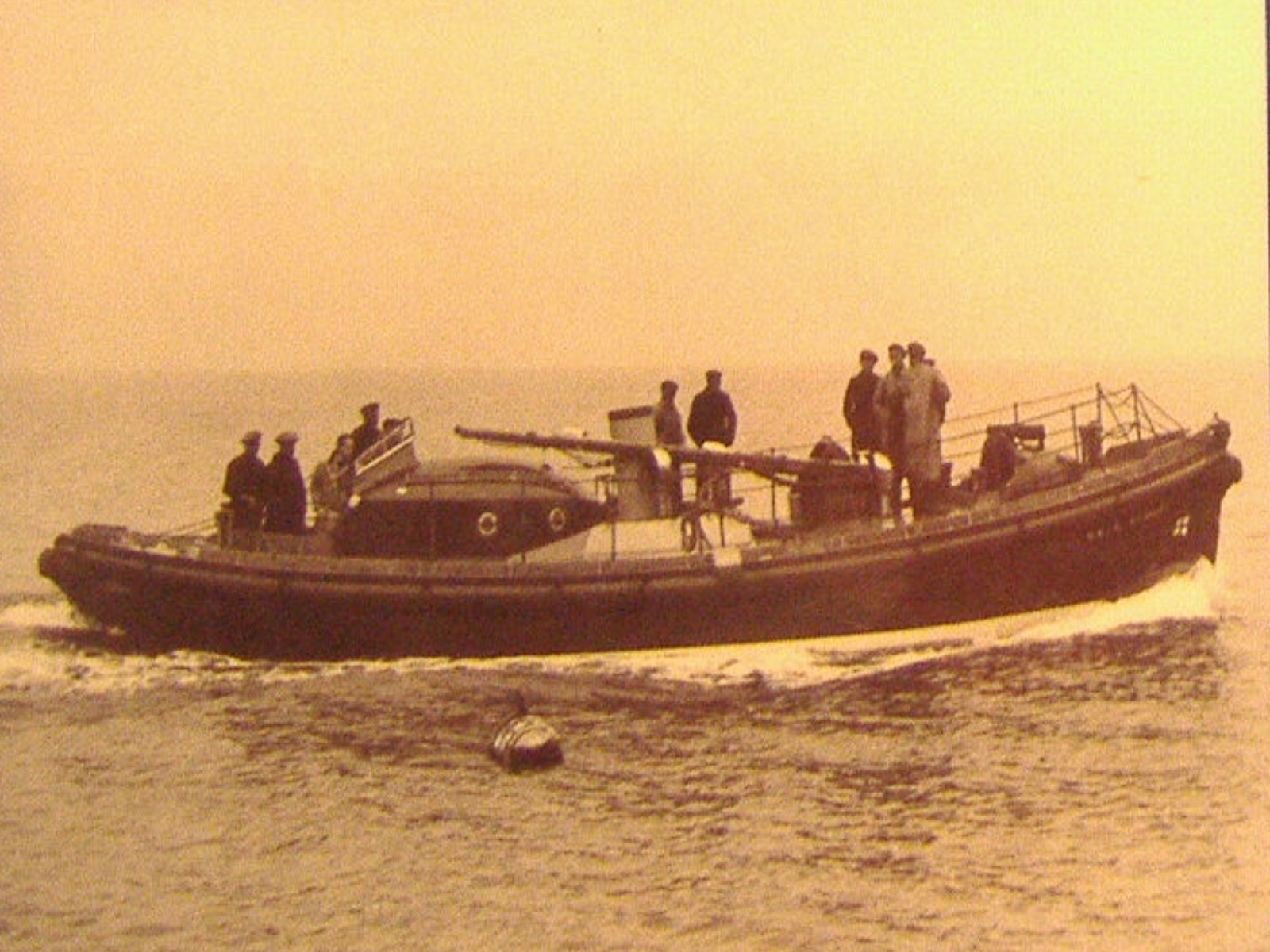
The H F Bailey at sea

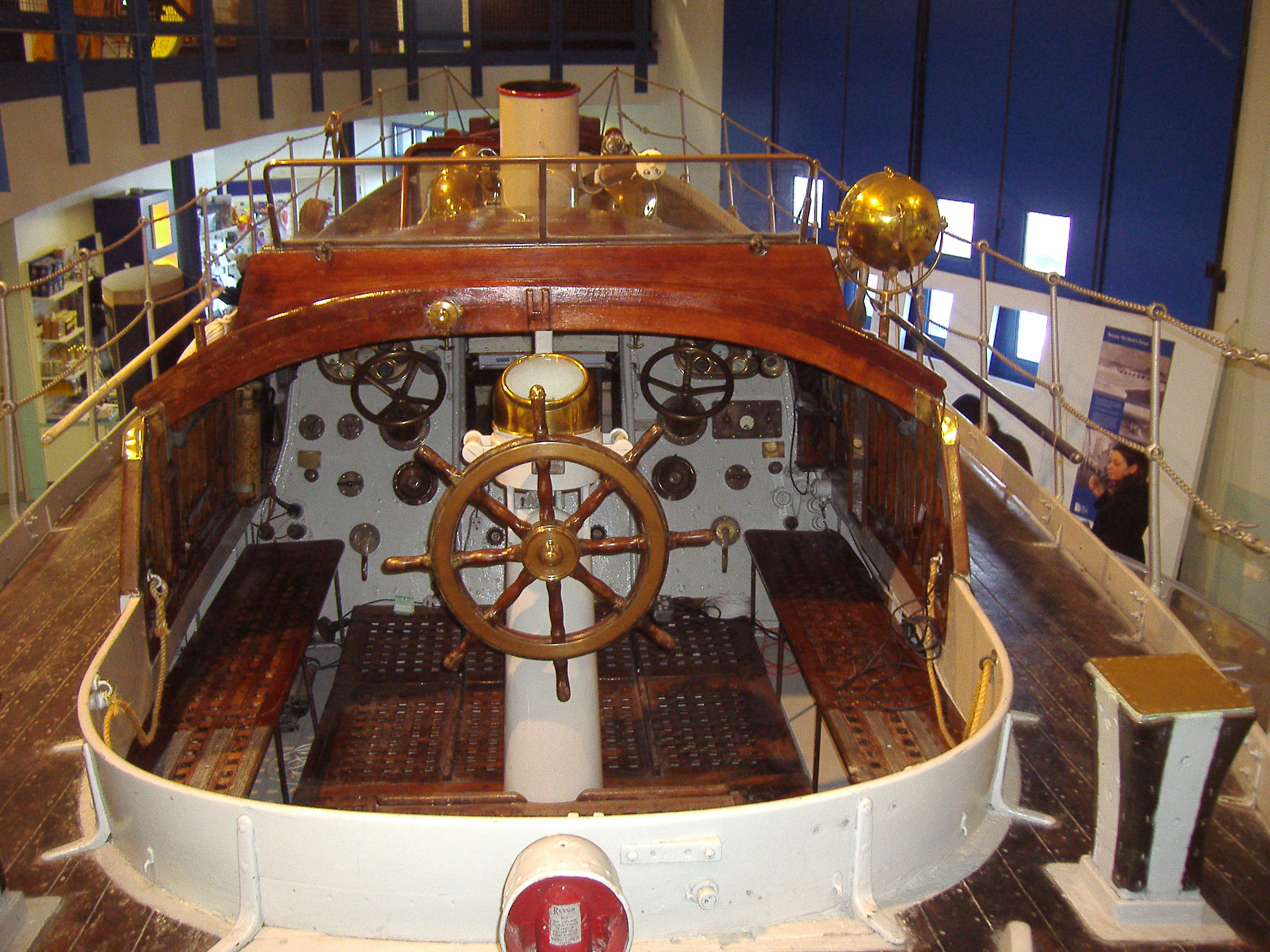
The wheel house

== See also ==
- Cromer Lifeboat H F Bailey ON 694
