= SB Hibernia =

75-ton spritsail Thames barge built in Greenhithe, Kent in England in 1906

History

United Kingdom
- Name: Hibernia
- Owner: 1906-1922 Frederick T Eberhardt (Everard from 1917), Greenhithe; 1922-1938 F T Everard & Sons Ltd, Greenhithe
- Builder: Frederick Eberhardt, Greenhithe
- Commissioned: 1906
- Identification: Official number 120677
- Fate: Wrecked 9–10 November 1937

General characteristics
- Tonnage: 79 gross register tons (GRT)
- Length: 90.95 ft (27.72 m)
- Beam: 22 ft (6.7 m)
- Draught: 7.75 ft (2.36 m)
- Propulsion: Sail
- Speed: 8 knots (15 km/h) maximum speed
- Capacity: 109 tonnes

The SB Hibernia was a 75-ton spritsail Thames barge built in Greenhithe, Kent in England in 1906, and which was wrecked on the North Sea coast at East Runton during the night of 9/10 November 1937. Her crew of three were rescued by the Cromer lifeboat.

The sailing barge was a sister to the Cambria which has been restored to full sailing usage, by the Cambria Trust. Built alongside the Hibernia, and identical in all respects, the Cambria was the last spritsail barge to operate commercially in the United Kingdom.

The Hibernia was owned by F. T. Everard & Sons of Greenhithe and was outward bound from Goole in Yorkshire to Sittingbourne in Kent with a load of coal. The vessel had left Goole two weeks before, and until the morning of 9 November had been lying at Grimsby Roads. The master of the vessel was Harry Couchman, the mate was William Lane and the cabin boy was Harry Couchman Jr, the 15-year-old son of the Master.

The weather had been moderate when the spritsail left Grimsby but turned squally. On the run south the weather turned foul and a strong north-easterly gale, with winds up to 60 mph sprang up. The master, who had had command of the vessel for the previous two years, found it impossible to make for deeper water and the Hibernia became trapped on a lee shore, a dangerous situation for any vessel but especially a sailing vessel.

At about 3.00pm she began to take on water and the mate and the cabin boy manned the pumps in an effort to prevent the barge from being swamped. At one stage there was more than four feet of water in the forecastle. One of the sails was torn away and was soon followed by the jib. By the early evening the vessel had sprung a leak and become unmanageable and the master began firing distress rockets. An unnamed steamship sighted the rockets and sent a radio call for help.

The Cromer lifeboat H F Bailey, under the command of coxswain Henry Blogg put to sea and took about an hour to locate the Hibernia. The position given by the steamship provided great assistance in locating her. The starboard light had been swept away and the port light was not visible to Coxswain Blogg at the angle the lifeboat approached the vessel.

The crew were taken off and the lifeboat, after running before the wind, landed them at Gorleston as it was impossible to return to Cromer due to the gale and high seas. The Hibernia was swept past Cromer with her remaining sails set and one light showing. She eventually caught on the Runton sewer pipe for some hours before beaching and breaking up.

The lifeboat is now a permanent display at the RNLI museum at Cromer.
