= HMS Keith =

Destroyer

- Keith at anchor

History

United Kingdom
- Name: Keith
- Namesake: Lord Keith
- Ordered: 22 March 1929
- Builder: Vickers-Armstrongs, Barrow
- Yard number: 656
- Laid down: 1 October 1929
- Launched: 10 July 1930
- Completed: 20 March 1931
- Identification: Pennant number: D06
- Fate: Sunk by German aircraft, 1 June 1940

General characteristics
- Class & type: B-class destroyer
- Displacement: 1,400 long tons (1,422 t) (standard); 1,821 long tons (1,850 t) (deep load)
- Length: 323 ft (98.5 m) o/a
- Beam: 32 ft 3 in (9.8 m)
- Draught: 12 ft 3 in (3.7 m)
- Installed power: 34,000 shp (25,000 kW); 3 × Admiralty 3-drum boilers
- Propulsion: 2 × shafts; 2 × Parsons geared steam turbines
- Speed: 35 knots (65 km/h; 40 mph)
- Range: 4,800 nmi (8,900 km; 5,500 mi) at 15 knots (28 km/h; 17 mph)
- Complement: 175
- Sensors & processing systems: Type 119 ASDIC
- Armament: 4 × single 4.7-inch (120 mm) Mk IX guns; 2 × single QF 2-pounder (40 mm) Mk II AA guns; 2 × quadruple 21 in (533 mm) torpedo tubes; 20 × depth charges, 1 rail and 2 throwers

HMS Keith was a B-class destroyer flotilla leader built for the Royal Navy around 1930. Initially assigned to the Mediterranean Fleet, she was placed in reserve in 1937, after repairs from a collision were completed. During the Spanish Civil War of 1936–1939, the ship was reactivated and spent some time in Spanish waters, enforcing the arms blockade imposed by Britain and France on both sides of the conflict. Keith escorted convoys and conducted anti-submarine patrols early in World War II before being sunk at Dunkirk by German aircraft.

== Description ==
Keith displaced 1,400 long tons (1,422 t) at standard load and 1,821 long tons (1,850 t) at deep load. The ship had an overall length of 323 feet (98.5 m), a beam of 32 feet 3 inches (9.8 m) and a draught of 12 feet 3 inches (3.7 m). She was powered by Parsons geared steam turbines, driving two shafts, which developed a total of 34,000 shaft horsepower (25,000 kW) and gave a maximum speed of 35 knots (65 km/h; 40 mph). Steam for the turbines was provided by three Admiralty 3-drum boilers. Keith carried a maximum of 390 long tons (396 t) of fuel oil that gave her a range of 4,800 nautical miles (8,900 km; 5,500 mi) at 15 knots (28 km/h; 17 mph). The ship's complement was 175 officers and men.

The ship mounted four 45-calibre QF 4.7-inch Mk IX guns in single mounts. For anti-aircraft (AA) defence, Keith had two 40-millimetre (1.6 in) QF 2-pounder Mk II AA guns mounted on a platform between her funnels. She was fitted with two above-water quadruple torpedo tube mounts for 21-inch (533 mm) torpedoes. One depth charge rail and two throwers were fitted; 20 depth charges were originally carried, but this increased to 35 shortly after the war began.

== Career ==
The ship was ordered, the first ship of her name in the Royal Navy, on 22 March 1929 from Vickers-Armstrongs at Barrow, under the 1928 Naval Programme. She was laid down on 1 October 1929 and launched on 10 July 1930. Keith was completed on 20 March 1931 at a cost of £219,800, excluding items supplied by the Admiralty such as guns, ammunition and communications equipment. After her commissioning, she was assigned to the 4th Destroyer Flotilla as its flotilla leader. Aside from a refit at Chatham Dockyard between 4 September and 18 October 1933, the ship remained with the Mediterranean Fleet until 1936. Keith collided with the Greek steamship, Atonis G. Lemos, in thick fog in the English Channel on 24 August 1936 whilst en route from Gibraltar to Portsmouth for another refit. The refit was not completed until 13 February 1937 and she then spent six months in reserve at Sheerness. The ship was recommissioned on 14 August 1937 to replace the flotilla leader of the 6th Destroyer Flotilla, Faulknor, whilst the latter ship was being repaired after a collision. Keith spent several months deployed off the Spanish Biscay coast during the Spanish Civil War and was later based in Gibraltar. The ship returned to Sheerness on 4 November and was reduced to reserve again. She received a brief refit at Chatham from 9 May to 16 June 1938. Upon its completion, Keith rejoined the 4th Destroyer Flotilla, which was now assigned to Home Fleet. She was transferred, taking on the crew of Electra, to the 5th Destroyer Flotilla at Gibraltar on 17 January 1939. The ship remained with the 5th Flotilla until April and then she returned home. Keith was refitted at Chatham between 11 May and 15 July and placed in reserve again on 31 July.

Shortly before the war began in September, the ship was recommissioned and assigned to the 17th Destroyer Flotilla of Home Fleet. On 3 September, she was transferred to Western Approaches Command for anti-submarine patrols, based at Milford Haven. On 10 September, Keith escorted a convoy carrying the British Expeditionary Force (BEF) to France. On 29 October she was transferred to the 22nd Destroyer Flotilla at Harwich and became its flotilla leader five days later. In December, Keith had repairs made to her propellers at HM Dockyard Devonport that lasted until 10 January 1940. She was transferred to the 19th Destroyer Flotilla in February and Keith escorted her sister Boadicea on 5 March as she towed the damaged oil tanker John F. Meyer to Southampton. The ship resumed her escort and patrol duties until May when the Germans attacked.

=== Battle of France ===
On 10 May 1940, the Germans launched their invasion of France and the Low Countries. That day Keith and her sister Boreas escorted the light cruisers Arethusa and Galatea as they carried bullion from the Dutch port of IJmuiden to the United Kingdom for safe-keeping. On 12 May, she returned to the Hook of Holland in the Netherlands to evacuate Allied troops. After the destroyer Whitley had to be run aground on 19 May after she was damaged by German aircraft, she was scuttled by Keith. On 21 May, Keith was one of three destroyers that evacuated 468 civilians from France. Two days later the ship was in Boulogne-sur-Mer, loading British troops to be evacuated, when she was attacked by German troops. She was hit by a mortar bomb and machine gun fire that killed her captain and wounded many others. Keith sailed for the UK immediately afterwards.

On the night of 30/31 May, the ship joined Operation Dynamo when she helped to evacuate 992 Allied troops from Dunkirk to Dover. She returned in the morning to De Panne and became flagship of Rear-Admiral Frederic Wake-Walker, commander of the evacuation. The ship was attacked by aircraft later that morning; a first attack damaged her steering gear, and a later attack sent a bomb down the aft funnel which exploded in the No. 2 boiler room, killing everyone inside and starting a fire. With no power available, she anchored and the abandon ship command was ordered. Keith sank at 09:45 at position 51°04′46″N 02°26′47″E. Three officers and 33 ratings were killed during the attacks, and eight officers and 123 crewmen were saved.

Keith's wreck was surveyed in 2016 and 2019, but found to be degraded significantly in 2023.
