= SS English Trader =

Merchant ship (1934–1941

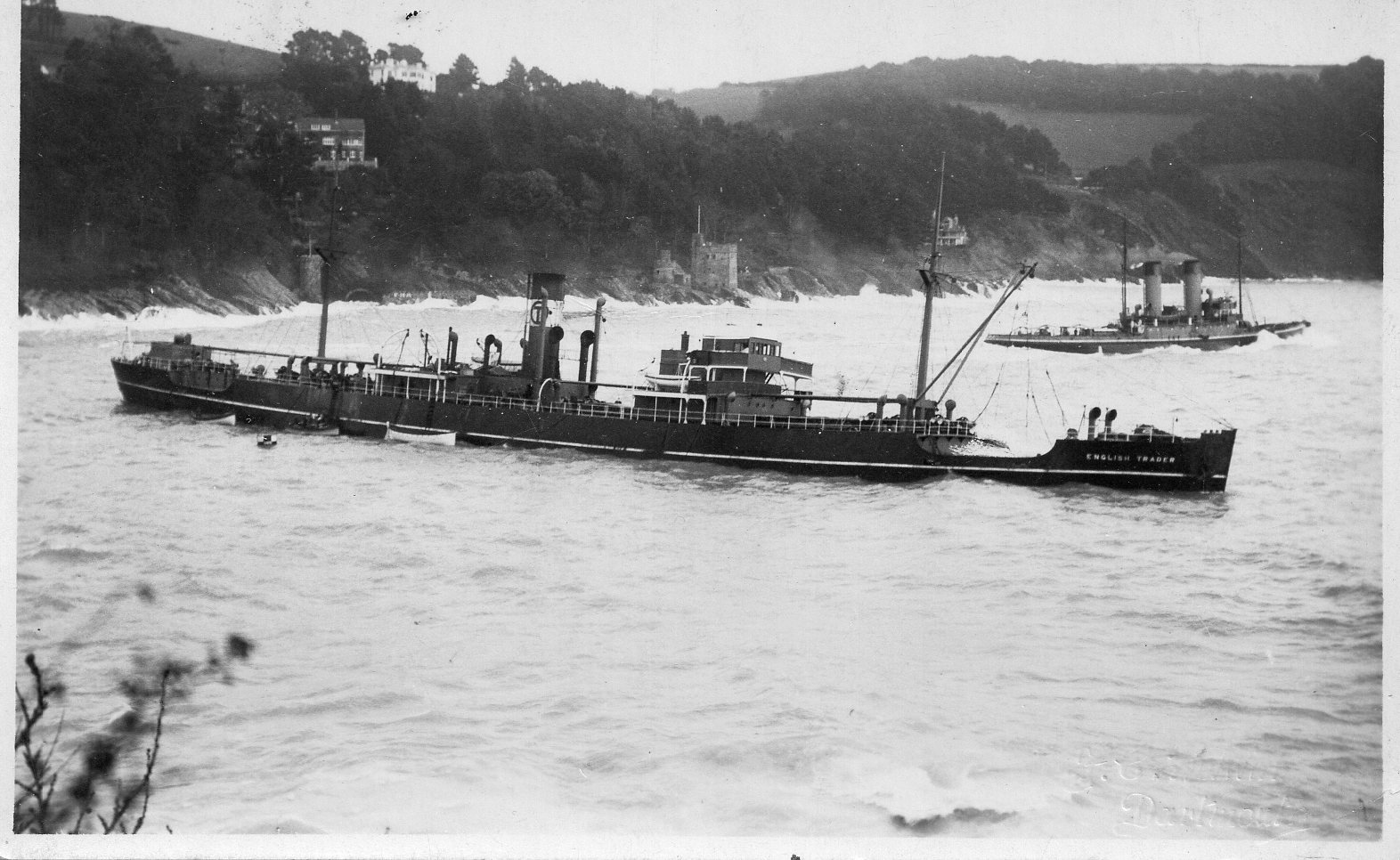
- SS English Trader ashore Checkstone Rock 4.30am 23 Jan 1937

History

United Kingdom
- Name: SS Arctees
- Owner: Arctees Shipping Company Ltd.
- Ordered: 1933
- Builder: Furness Ship Building Company Ltd
- Launched: 25 January 1934
- Maiden voyage: 1934

United Kingdom
- Name: SS English Trader
- Owner: Trader Navigation Company Ltd
- Acquired: 1936
- Out of service: 24 October 1941
- Home port: London
- Identification: UK Official Number 163446; Code letters GWPT
- Fate: Ran aground on Hammond Knoll on the North Norfolk Coast

General characteristics
- Tonnage: 3,953 GRT
- Length: 362 ft 5 in (110.46 m)
- Beam: 57 ft 5 in (17.50 m)
- Depth: 23 ft 6 in (7.16 m)
- Installed power: 357 hp (266 kW) nominal
- Propulsion: Two single-ended boilers with a working pressure of 220lb psi.; Triple expansion reciprocating steam engine (North East Marine Engineering Company Limited, Newcastle upon Tyne) 357 hp (266 kW); Single propeller
- Speed: 8–10 knots (15–19 km/h; 9.2–11.5 mph)
- Crew: 38

The SS English Trader was a British merchant ship wrecked off the coast of Norfolk, England in October 1941. After falling behind a convoy during the Second World War of which she was a part, the ship ran aground on the Hammond's Knoll sandbank and began to break up during a gale. Several rescue attempts by lifeboats failed, but a further attempt the following day by the Cromer Lifeboat rescued 44 of the crew, three having already been lost.

== Construction ==
The ship was built in 1934 at the shipyards of the Furness Ship Building Company Ltd at Haverton-Hill-on-Tees for the Arctees Shipping Company Ltd where she was then called Arctees. She was designed by Sir Joseph Isherwood and had his revolutionary "Arcform" hull design to improve fuel consumption. Fifty ships were built to that design between 1933 and 1954. In 1936, she was sold to the Trader Navigation Company Ltd as its first tramp vessel and renamed English Trader. All of the company's later vessels had the same "Trader" suffix.

== Service ==
The first three years of the vessel's life were uneventful. On 23 January 1937, the English Trader was in the waters of the Devon coast. While entering Dartmouth Harbour her steering gear failed and she ran aground close to Dartmouth Castle at the entrance to the harbour. The Torbay lifeboat attended and executed a hazardous rescue in darkness, saving 52 people.

Attempts were made to re-float the ship by four tugs and a Royal Navy destroyer without success. She was badly holed and some of the holds were filling with debris and so, after ten days of being stuck fast, drastic measures were taken to save the ship. This involved cutting the ship in two at her bow section which was eventually scrapped. The process took nineteen days after which the undamaged after part was pulled stern-first into Dartmouth Harbour. Later she was moved to Southampton. A contract was given to the Middle Docks & Engineering Company of South Shields to repair her. She was rebuilt from the boiler room forward in only 100 days.

=== Second World War ===
From the start of the Second World War the English Trader carried thousands of tons of cargo to and from the British Isles. For two years she crossed the seas avoiding U-boats, mines and aircraft attacks. In October 1941, she was berthed in London Docks where a cargo of sugar from Cuba was being unloaded. By 23 October, she had discharged her cargo and was taking aboard a mixed cargo bound for Mombasa, Kenya. The cargo contained a variety of export goods including farm tractors and other agricultural implements, umbrellas, pocket watches, whisky, Andrews Liver Salts, dresses and kitchenware. Stamped on the cases was "BRITAIN DELIVERS THE GOODS", in defiance of Germany's aggressive war against Britain.

In September 1940, while serving aboard the ship, Titanic's helmsman and quartermaster Robert Hichens died from a heart failure.

=== Convoy EC90 ===
Before her next voyage, a virtually new crew had been signed on – of the crew of 47, only eight men had been on the previous voyage. This eight included Captain Grimstone and his three deck officers, the mate John Elliot, William Hickson the gun layer, two other gunners and the ship steward. On 24 October, in the early afternoon the English Trader left the Thames. By late afternoon she had reached Southend-on-Sea. Here the Thames Estuary was wide enough for convoys to form up in relative safety. Convoy EC90 was made up of 20 ocean-going freighters, two or three coastal steamers and two Royal Navy destroyers, one of which was the ageing HMS Vesper. Convoy EC90 set off on its voyage in single file to start with, proceeding at a steady eight knots (15 km/h; 9.2 mph). For the English Trader this was close to her maximum speed with a crew who knew how to get the best from her, which the new crew did not. The convoy's route took it up the east coast of England and around the top of Scotland and down into the Atlantic Ocean. The English Channel was far too hazardous for shipping convoys at this stage of the war. By 3 pm, the English Trader's troubles had begun. She had been running sluggishly, which had been noticed by the crew members from previous voyages. She was now a least a one-half mile (0.80 km) behind the bulk of the convoy and HMS Vesper was enquiring for the reasons for the poor speed of the ship. The speculation from the more experienced crew members was that the English Trader's coal-fired boilers, which were forced draught fed, required the booster fans to be precisely set. It was agreed that the ill-experienced new crew and the new chief engineer were unable to accomplish this. The captain was told by the commodore aboard the Vesper that if she could not regain her position in the convoy by nightfall she should make for harbour at one of the east coast ports.

=== Aircraft attack ===
By nightfall the English Trader was some five miles (8.0 km) from the convoy and at times laboured to achieve four knots (7.4 km/h; 4.6 mph), making her vulnerable to attack by enemy U-boats and aircraft. The situation was made worse when, in the darkness, the convoy ahead came under brief air attack, followed by an attack on the English Trader by a German Dornier Do 17 bomber. The gunner aboard English Trader opened up at the approaching aircraft, which released two bombs, which narrowly missed the ship. Two large pillars of white foam rose as high as her mast on the port side just yards from the ship. The bomber now swooped over the ship and into the darkness to prepare for another attack. HMS Vesper, which had broken off from the main convoy to help, opened fire on the aircraft, possibly damaging it as it broke off its attack and was not seen again.

=== Aground on Hammond Knoll ===
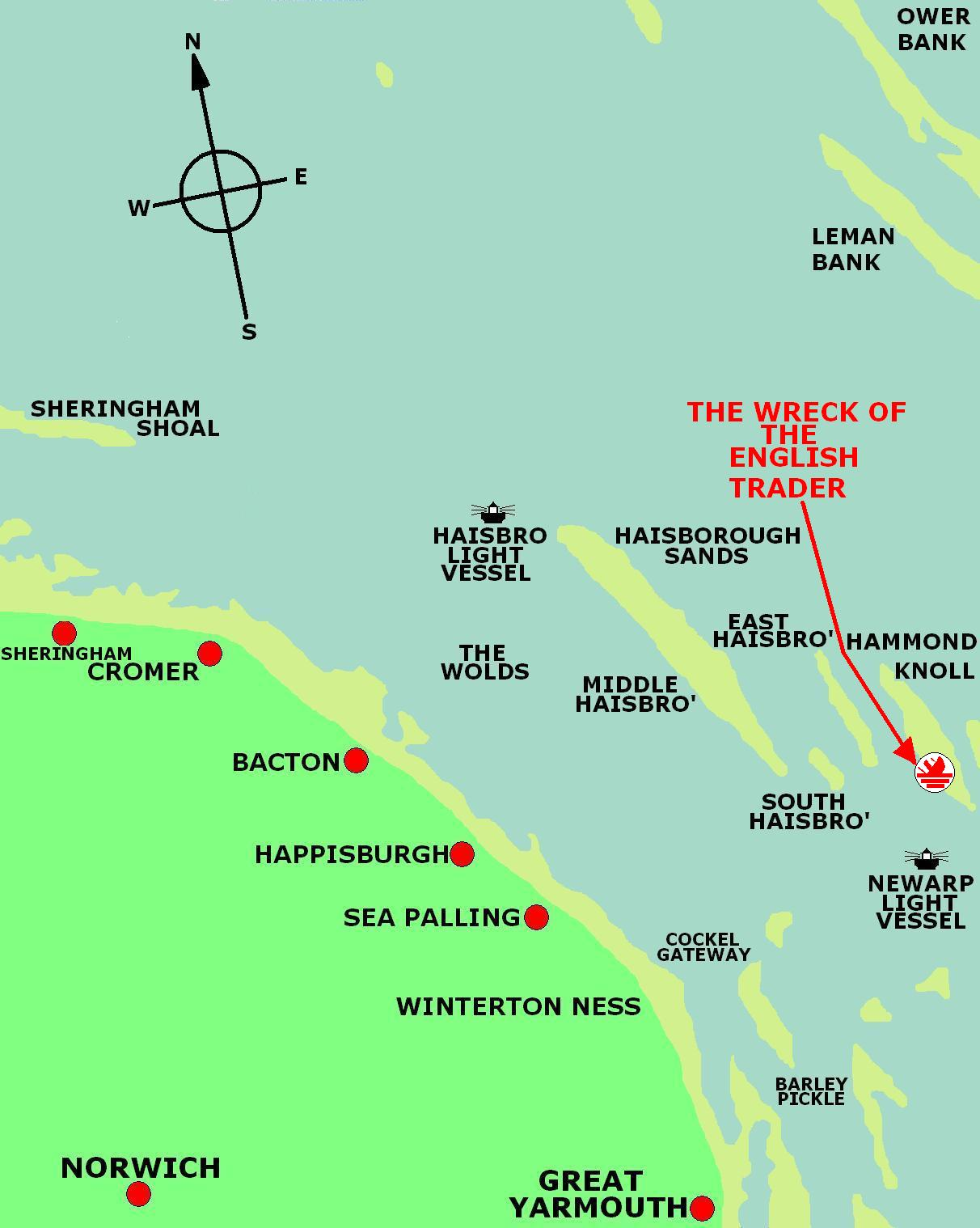
Map showing the site of the wreck of the English Trader

By midnight all was quiet, but the ship was still labouring to rejoin the main part of the convoy. Between 1 am and 1.30 am on Sunday 26 October, she was struggling against a strong ebbing tide, which in turn forced her dangerously close to the sandbanks of Hammond Knoll. At around 1.45 am the crew felt a slight jolt followed by a more severe jolt. This flung the ship forward followed by loud grinding, crunching and scraping of metal. Then there was silence. The ship had run aground on Hammond Knoll.

The English Trader was stranded on the knoll with her crew powerless to do anything about her. As the first signs of daylight approached, the weather began to rapidly deteriorate, with the wind reaching gale force. Ever increasing waves crashed around her decks, smashing the starboard lifeboat and its derrick. The ship's back had broken as it settled on the knoll and the sea started it relentless destruction of the English Trader. The port lifeboat, though in the lee of the storm, could not be launched because of the turbulent waves crashing around the sandbank.

=== Lifeboat launched ===
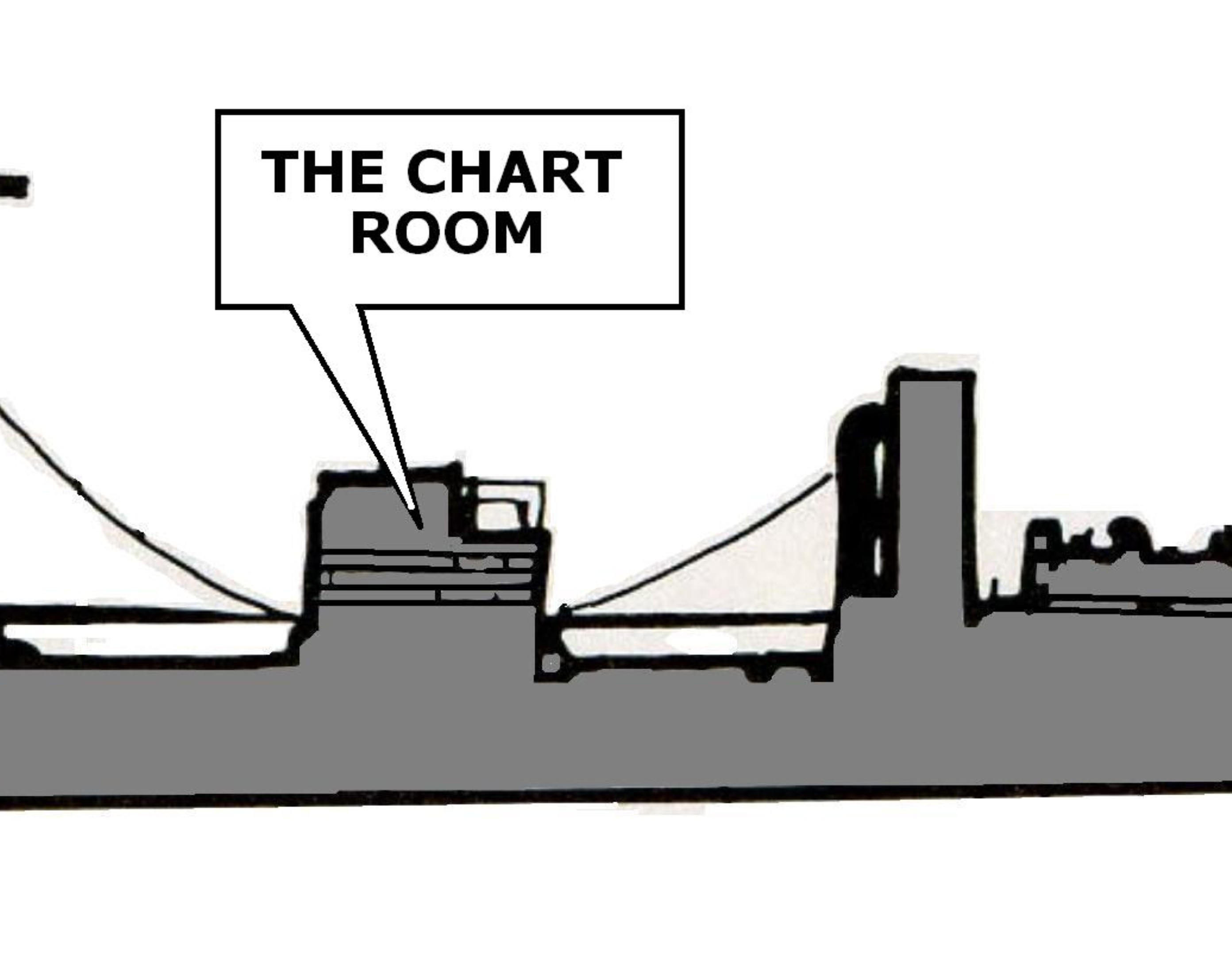
The chart room

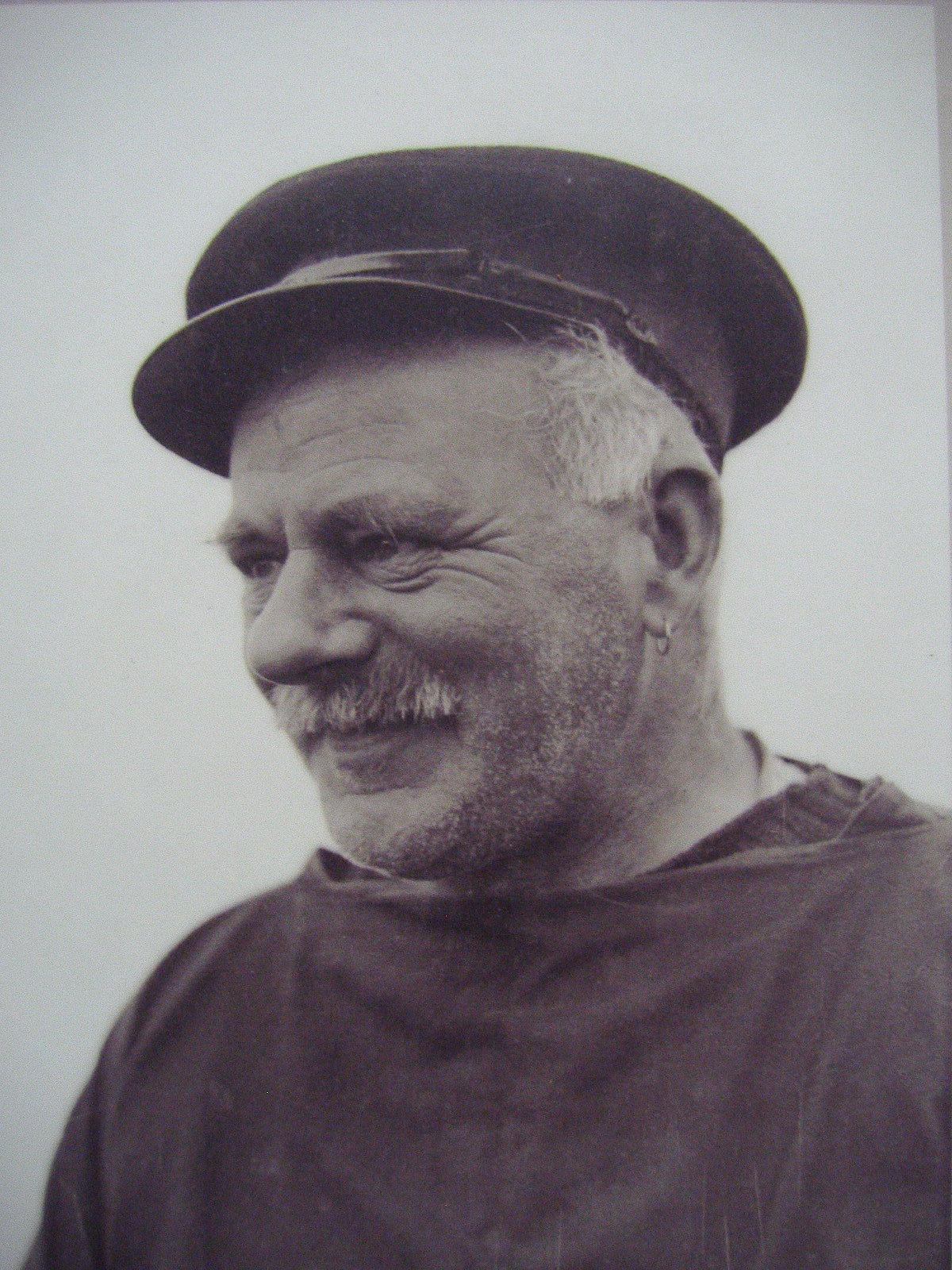
Signalman Edward Allen

At 8.15 am, the Cromer Lifeboat Station was alerted and asked to aid the English Trader and the lifeboat H F Bailey was launched. She was crewed by twelve men including the triple RNLI Gold Medal holding coxswain Henry Blogg. By 11.35 that morning, the lifeboat had reached Hammond Knoll. By this time, three of the English Trader's crew had been swept off the foundering ship to their death. By the time the H F Bailey reached the ship the gale was at full force. The remaining 44 crew of the stricken ship had taken refuge in the chart room, the highest and safest point on the ship. The Cromer lifeboat made two attempts to get a line to the English Trader without success. A further attempt at rescue resulted in a near disaster for the H F Bailey and in the death of one of her crew. Coxswain Blogg had attempted to approach the stricken vessel and a wall of water hit the lifeboat on her port side which washed five of the lifeboat men, including the non-swimmer Blogg, overboard. The five men were hauled back on to the lifeboat but the signalman, Edward "Boy Primo" W Allen after being in the water for 25 minutes fell unconscious and died a short time later. At 3 pm, the Cromer lifeboat broke off the rescue attempt and made for Great Yarmouth. Her crew had tried in vain for seven hours to rescue the crew of the English Trader and were now exhausted. Meanwhile, the Great Yarmouth and Gorleston Lifeboat had been launched and was on its way. Between 4 and 6 pm, that lifeboat made five attempts to get alongside, with a line, without success. After these attempts and with darkness setting in, Coxswain Charles Johnson and his crew also reluctantly returned to Great Yarmouth after receiving orders from the Royal Navy. By 8 am the next morning, the Cromer Lifeboat was back at the Sands. The sea had calmed considerably and the H F Bailey was able to take the beleaguered crew of 44 from the English Trader with relative ease, taking them to the safety of Great Yarmouth. The English Trader was then left stuck upon the sands of Hammond Knoll. Reports from the following day said that the English Trader had gone completely under the waves. Henry Blogg received a RNLI Silver Medal for this rescue.

=== Cromer Lifeboat crew ===
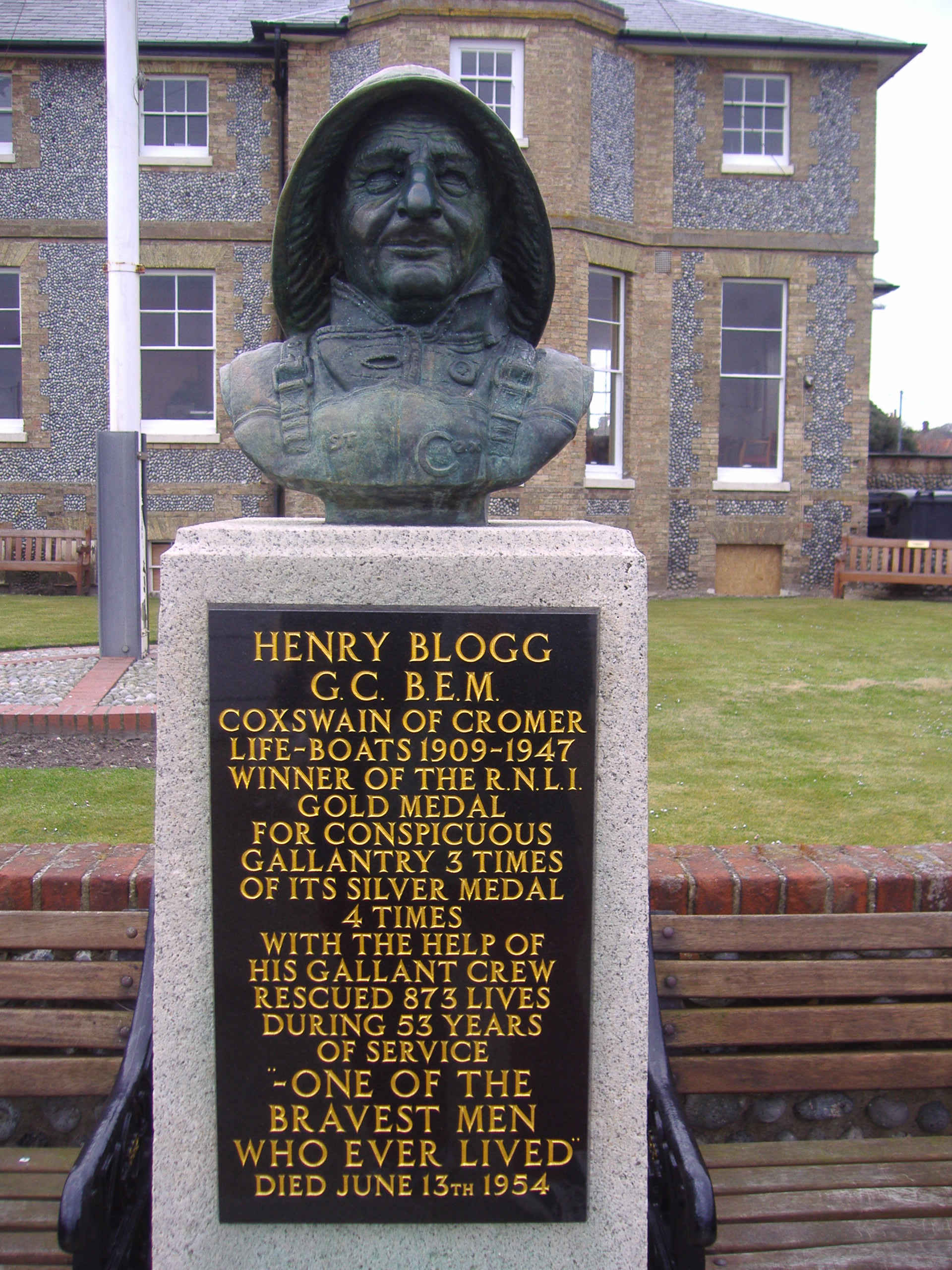
The bronze bust of Henry Blogg on the cliff top in North Lodge Park in Cromer, Norfolk

Crew of the Cromer Lifeboat H. F. Bailey
Name	Rank
Henry G Blogg	Coxswain
John J (Jack) Davies	Second Coxswain
Henry W (Swank) Davies	Mechanic
James W Davies	Assistant Mechanic
Edward W (Boy Primo) Allen	Signalman
William T (Captain) Davies	Bowman
John J Davies, jnr	Crewman
Sidney C (Kelly) Harrison	Crewman
Henry T (Shrimp) Davies	Crewman
William H (Pimpo) Davies	Crewman
Robert C Davies	Crewman
James R (Dick) Davies	Crewman
