= Hammond's Knoll =

Sandbank in the North Sea

- Shoal
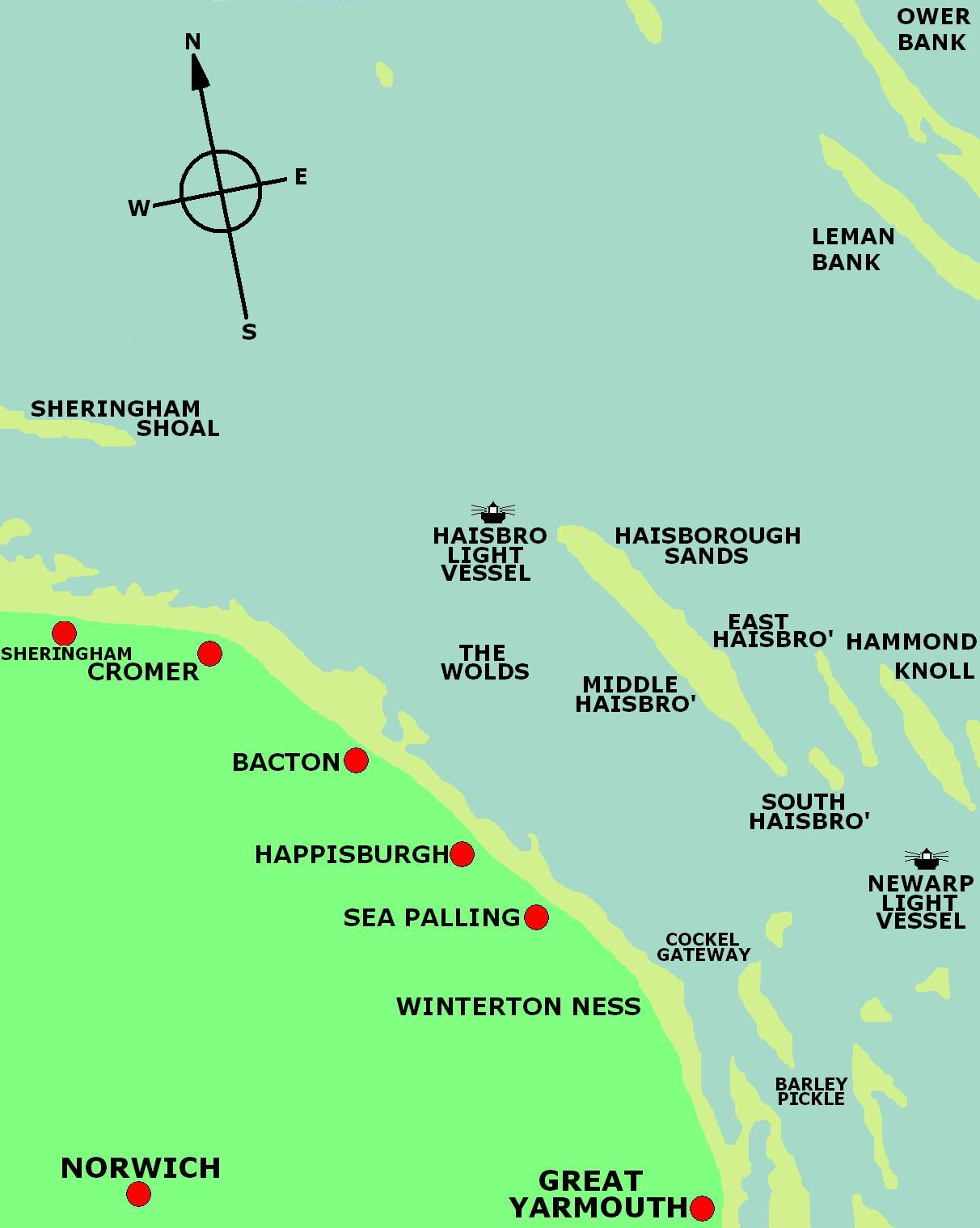
- Location map of Hammond's Knoll (right edge of map)
- Interactive map of Hammond's Knoll
- Coordinates: 52°52′N 1°55′E
- Location: Southern North Sea

Hammond's Knoll is a 6-mile (9.7 km) long sandbank off the coast of Norfolk, England at Happisburgh, to the east of Haisborough Sands. The sandbank at low tide has a depth of 6 fathoms (11 m) at each end, and 3 fathoms (5.5 m) in the centre. The sandbank has lighted buoys at its north and east ends. Hammond's Knoll forms part of the Haisborough, Hammond and Winterton Special Area of Conservation.

== Ships wrecked on Hammond's Knoll ==
Some of the ships wrecked here include:

- HMS Invincible - 1801 with the loss of 400 lives.
- Galatea - 1898
- SS English Trader - 1941

== See also ==
- Haisborough Sands - nearby sandbank, similarly treacherous
- Scroby Sands
