= Haisborough Sands =

Shoal in the North Sea

Haisborough Sands Haisboro Sands or Haisbro Sands
- Shoal
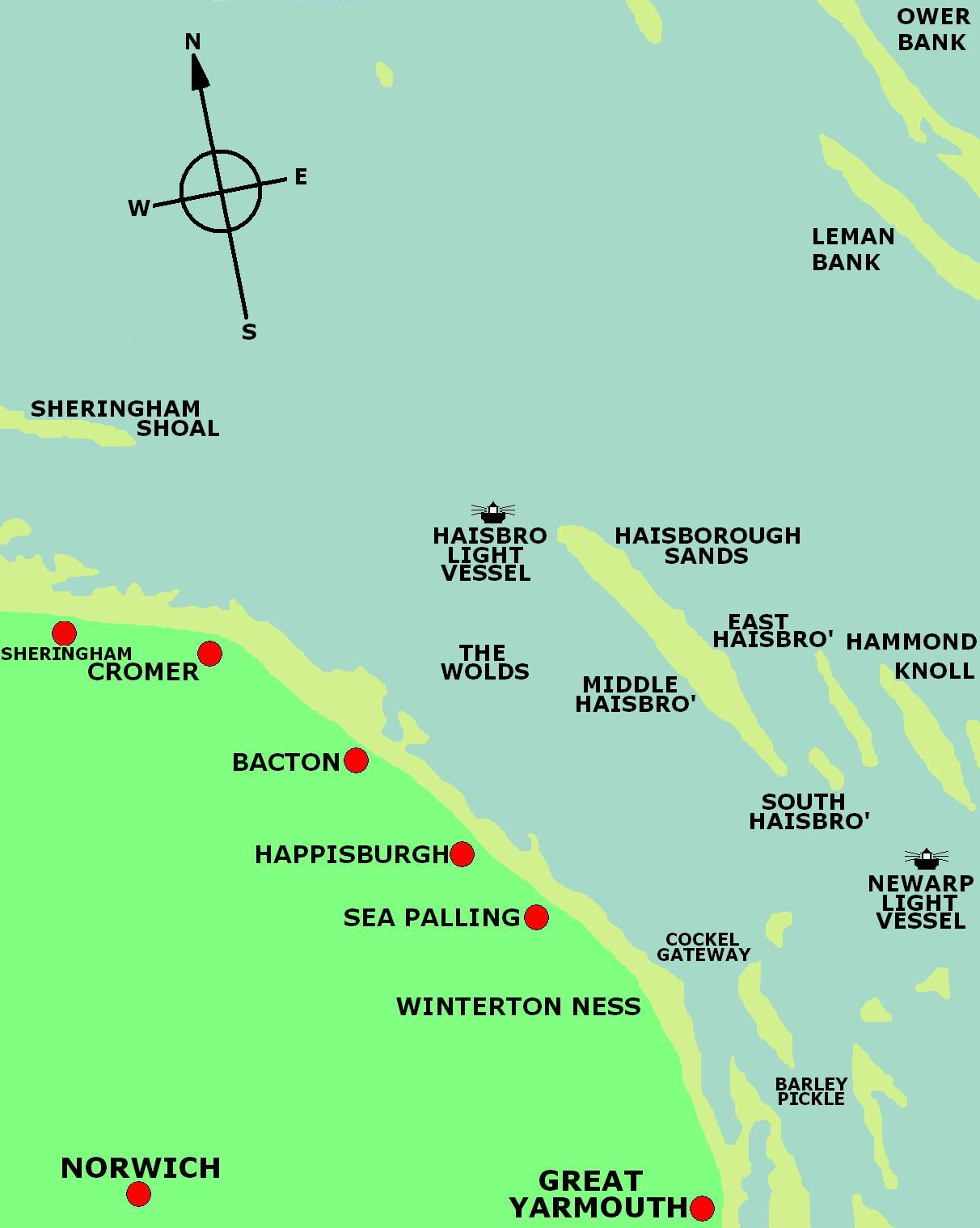
- Location map of Haisborough Sands
- Interactive map of Haisborough Sands
- Coordinates: 52°54′N 1°42′E
- Location: Southern North Sea, United Kingdom

Area
  - Total: 31.249 km^{2} (12.065 sq mi)

Dimensions
  - Length: 16 km (9.9 mi)
  - Width: 1.6 km (0.99 mi)

Haisborough Sands (or Haisboro Sands or Haisbro Sands) is a sandbank off the coast of Norfolk, England at Happisburgh. The shoal is 10 miles (16 km) long and 1 mile (1.6 km) wide and lies parallel to the north-east coast of Norfolk. The shoal is marked to the northwest by north by the Haisbro Light Buoy, North cardinal. To the southeast by south is a light buoy South cardinal, and to the west by Mid Haisbro light buoy starboard hand. In 1995 there were three drying patches recorded to the north-northeast and east-southeast of the Mid Haisbro light buoy. Except at slack water their positions are indicated by tidal eddies particularly on the northwest, and in slight or moderate seas the swell breaks on the shallower parts of the banks. There are several foul patches on the southern part of the shoal. Over the years this shoal has claimed many ships.

== Description ==
Haisborough Sands forms part of the Haisborough, Hammond and Winterton Special Area of Conservation. The main ridge of the shoal is made up of five distinct areas. These are named Haisborough Sand, Haisborough Tail, Hammond Knoll, Winterton Ridge and Hearty Knoll. To the eastern edge of the sands there are areas called Hewett Ridge and Smiths Knoll which form a ridge of sandbanks on the outer boundary of the sands. Inshore and to the west there are additional banks including Winterton Shoal and the Newarp Banks.

== Fish and mammals ==
Haisborough Sands and its surrounding shoals are known to be spawning grounds for sand eels, lemon sole, and sole. The sands also provide nursery grounds for cod, herring, mackerel, and plaice . There are small numbers of harbour porpoise regularly observed within the boundaries of the sands. The common seals which are resident in the Wash are occasionally observed in this area.

== Ships wrecked on Haisborough Sands ==
The Haisborough Sands have been responsible for a number of shipwrecks. One of the most significant involved several vessels lost on 6 August 1941 during the Second World War; several ships within Convoy FS 559, an East Coast convoy of colliers, carrying primarily coal to London, were lost when they ran aground on the Sands in poor weather as a result of the convoy's commodore mistakenly ordering a course onto the sands. The true facts of the incident were kept hidden from the public until after the war.

Some of the ships wrecked here include:

- HMS Bideford New Year's Eve 1761/2
- HMS Invincible – 16 March 1801
- Yacht Zoe on 24 May 1857
- Barque Speculator on 6 December 1875
- SS Chicago – 1878
- SS Bywell Castle on 10 February 1883.
- Barque Brownrigg on 12 August 1888
- SS Cambria after a collision with SS Killingworth on 14 May 1891
- Barque Ceylon of Christiania, Norway, 1893
- Optima ex Placilla – 18 January 1905
- SS Atbara of London on 11 February 1907
- An un-named steamer – 1907
- Barque Alf of Laurvig, Norway on 23 November 1909
- SS Bodil of Esbjerg on 26 May 1915
- SS Camille on 6 January 1916
- SS Kronprindsesse Victoria of Haugesund, Norway. 26 November 1917
- SS Georgia – 1927
- SS Monte Nevoso during 14–16 October 1932
- SS Meriones 26 January 1941
- SS Gallois; part of Convoy FS 559 on 6 August 1941
- SS Oxshott of London; part of Convoy FS 559 on 6 August 1941
- SS Aberhill of Methil, Fife; part of Convoy FS 559 on 6 August 1941
- SS Taara of Pärnu, Estonia; part of Convoy FS 559 on 6 August 1941
- SS Paddy Hendly on her maiden voyage; part of Convoy FS 559 on 6 August 1941
- SS Deerwood of London; part of Convoy FS 559 on 6 August 1941
- SS Betty Hindley; part of Convoy FS 559 on 6 August 1941
- SS Afon Towy on 6 August 1941
- HM Trawler Agate (referred to as T87 by the Admiralty); part of Convoy FS 559 on 6 August 1941
- Trawler MV Cuttlefish – 1981
- City of Sunderland – 2008
- Muros – 3 December 2016

== Gallery ==
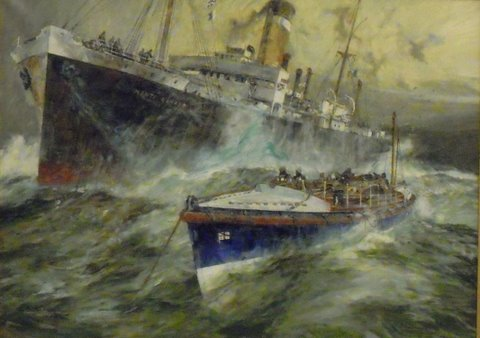
The SS Monte Nevoso marooned on the Haisborough Sands

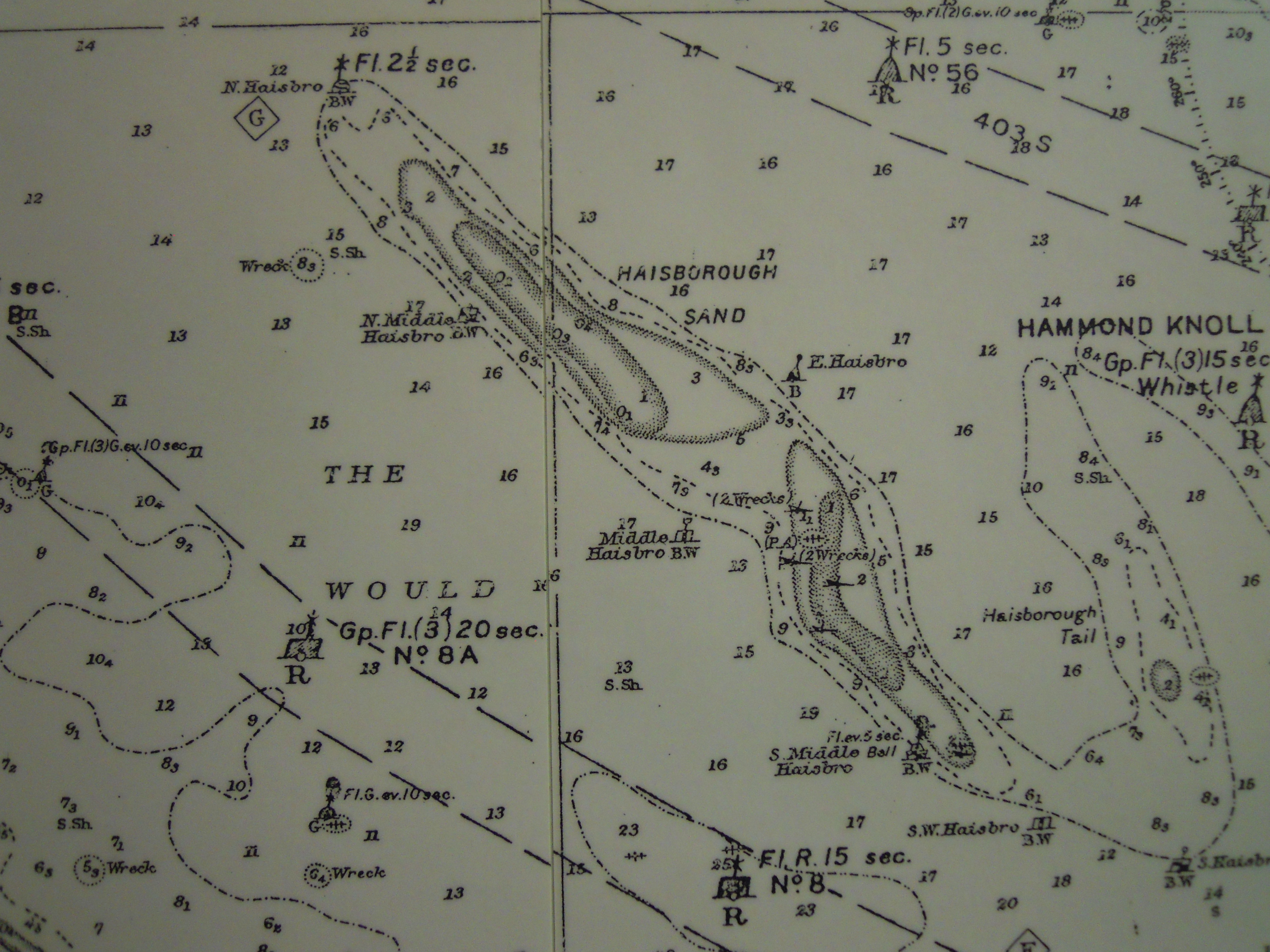
Admiralty chart of Haisborough Sands

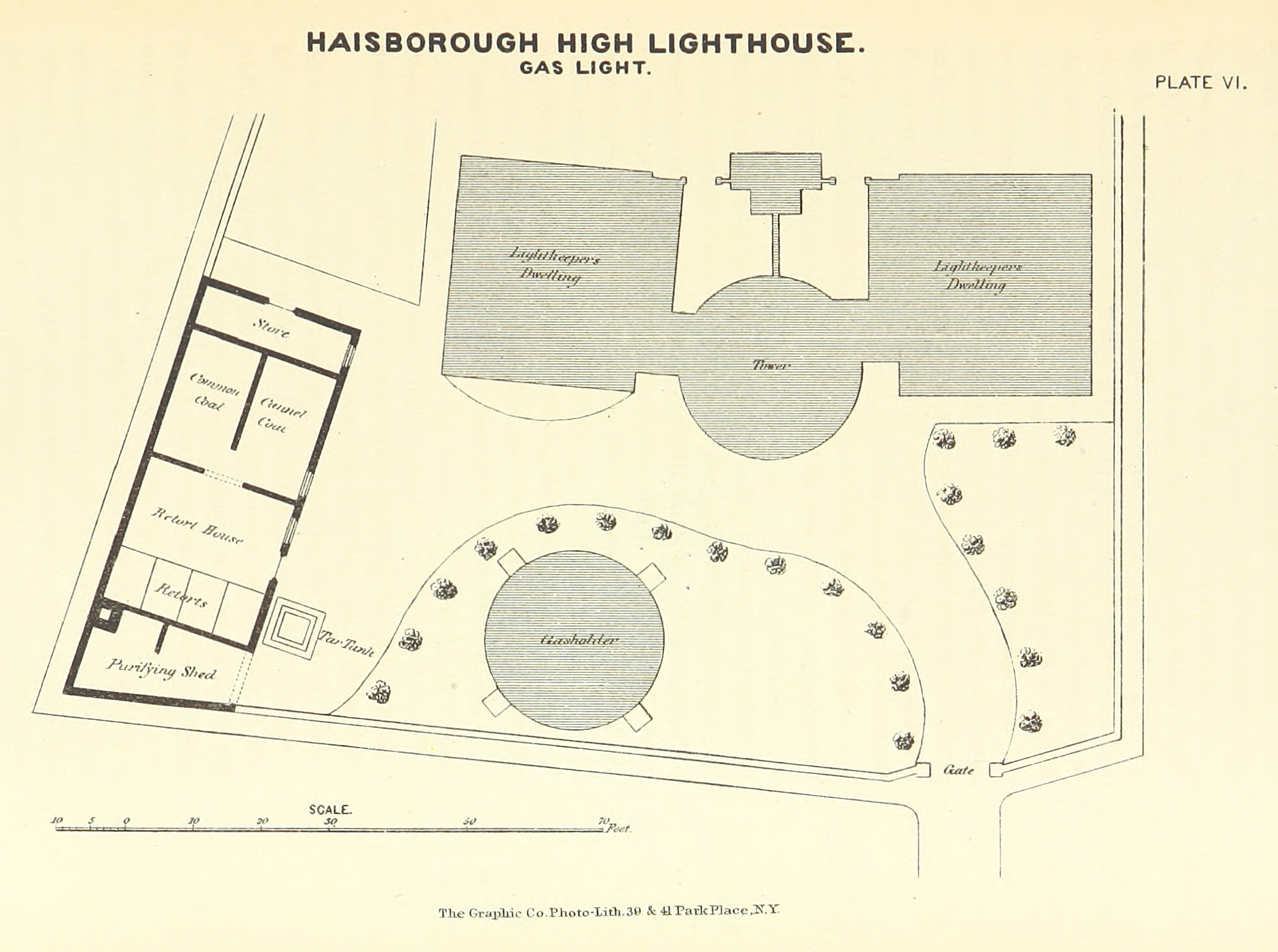
Chart of the Haisborough Sands Lighthouse

== See also ==
- Happisburgh Lifeboat Station
- Hammond's Knoll - nearby sandbank, similarly treacherous
- Scroby Sands
