= HMS Vimiera (1917) =

V-class destroyer of the British Royal Navy

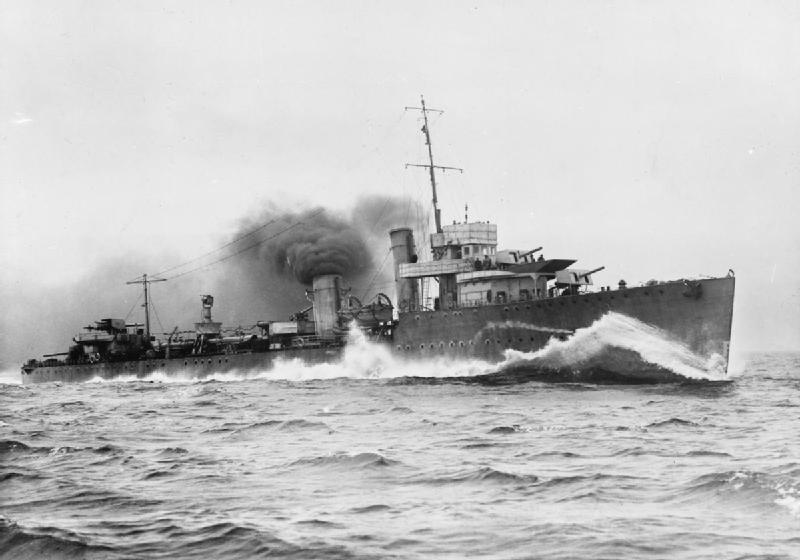
- Vimiera circa 1918

History

United Kingdom
- Name: HMS Vimiera
- Namesake: Battle of Vimeiro (1808)
- Builder: Swan Hunter, Tyne and Wear
- Laid down: October 1916
- Launched: 22 June 1917
- Completed: 19 September 1917
- Motto: Sicut clin: ‘Victory as formerly’
- Fate: Sank on 9 January 1942 after striking a mine in the Thames estuary, off Warden, Kent.
- Badge: On a Field Black a lion's head Red, rising out of an Eastern crown, Gold.

General characteristics
- Class & type: Admiralty V-class destroyer
- Displacement: 1,272-1,339 tons
- Length: 300 ft (91.4 m) o/a, 312 ft (95.1 m) p/p
- Beam: 26 ft 9 in (8.2 m)
- Draught: 9 ft (2.7 m) standard, 11 ft 3 in (3.4 m) deep
- Propulsion: 3 Yarrow type Water-tube boilers; Brown-Curtis steam turbines; 2 shafts, 27,000 shp
- Speed: 34 kn
- Range: 320-370 tons oil, 3,500 nmi at 15 kn, 900 nmi at 32 kn
- Complement: 110
- Armament: 4 × QF 4 in Mk.V (102mm L/45), mount P Mk.I; 2 × QF 2 pdr Mk.II "pom-pom" (40 mm L/39) or; 1 z QF 12 pdr 20 cwt Mk.I (76 mm), mount HA Mk.II; 4 (2x2) tubes for 21 in torpedoes
- Notes: Pennant number: L29

HMS Vimiera was a V-class destroyer ordered as part of the 1917–18 programme.

== Early activity ==
One of her early missions was a trip to Reval, conveying Leonid Krasin and Viktor Nogin back to the Russian Socialist Federal Soviet Republic, following the first stage of negotiations in the Anglo-Soviet Trade Agreement.

== Second World War ==
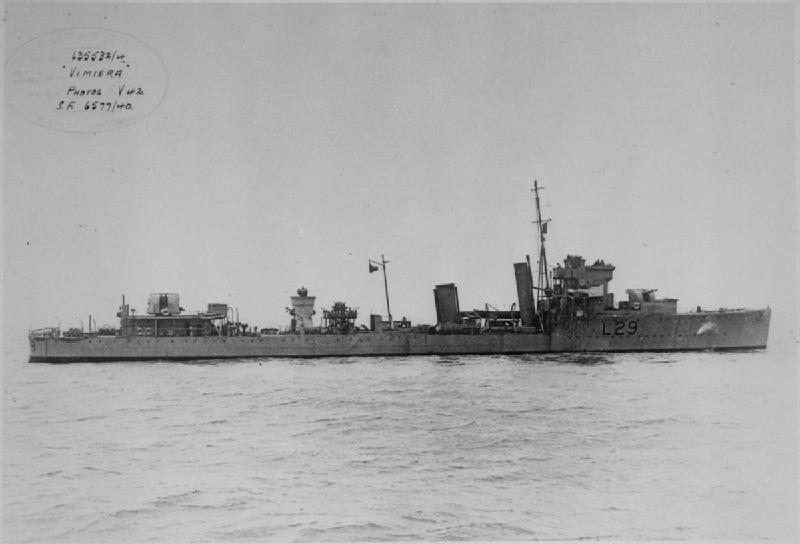
Underway following WAIR escort conversion.

Vimiera was chosen for conversion to an escort destroyer (WAIR) with an enhanced anti-aircraft and anti-submarine capability as part of the naval rearmament programme preceding the outbreak of war in September 1939. Conversion was complete, whereon in January 1940 she joined the Nore Command for coastal convoy escort duty in the North Sea and English Channel. Her company was formed largely of men from the Clyde Division of the Royal Naval Reserve, HMS Graham.

In April 1940 she was transferred under the Commander-in-Chief, Dover to support military operations in France. This included the Battle of Dunkirk to providing additional anti-aircraft defence in Dunkirk (Operation FA) and assisting in the evacuation of allied personnel from Flushing. With HMS Wolsey she provided naval gunfire support for military operations at Escault. On 19 May she rescued survivors from HMS Whitley and in the following days she assisted both in taking reinforcements to Boulogne and in evacuating wounded soldiers and medical staff. (One soldier she evacuated was the actor Arnold Ridley.) Alongside HMS Wessex, ORP Burza, HMS Whitshed, and HMS Wolfhound she saw action around Boulogne and Calais, during which Wessex was sunk and Vimiera sustained substantial damage. She was taken into repair on 25 May 1940, and so was not involved in the evacuation from Dunkirk. She was subsequently redeployed to the North Sea in defence of East Coast convoys.

In December 1941, she was adopted by the civil community of Sandbach, Cheshire, following the successful Warship Week National Saving campaign. Vimiera, under the command of Lieutenant-Commander Angus Alexander Mackenzie, RNR, was sunk by a mine in the Thames estuary off East Spile Buoy, near the Isle of Sheppey on 9 January 1942 with the loss of around 96 hands. 92 or 93 went down with the ship, and a further four of the 38 survivors died of wounds. The survivors were brought to shore and tended to at Sheerness.

Eight of her nine officers survived, and Lt. Cdr. Mackenzie, having been found blameless in the sinking, was put in command of HMS Liddesdale. Vimiera's loss was commemorated on a memorial within HMS Graham.

== Bibliography ==
- Campbell, John (1985). Naval Weapons of World War II. Annapolis, Maryland: Naval Institute Press. ISBN 0-87021-459-4.
- Chesneau, Roger, ed. (1980). Conway's All the World's Fighting Ships 1922–1946. Greenwich, UK: Conway Maritime Press. ISBN 0-85177-146-7.
- Colledge, J. J.; Warlow, Ben (2006) [1969]. Ships of the Royal Navy: The Complete Record of All Fighting Ships of the Royal Navy from the 15th Century to the Present (3rd Rev ed.). London: Chatham Publishing. ISBN 978-1-86176-281-8. OCLC 67375475.
- Cocker, Maurice (1981). Destroyers of the Royal Navy, 1893–1981. Ian Allan. ISBN 0-7110-1075-7.
- Friedman, Norman (2009). British Destroyers From Earliest Days to the Second World War. Annapolis, Maryland: Naval Institute Press. ISBN 978-1-59114-081-8.
- Gardiner, Robert & Gray, Randal, eds. (1985). Conway's All the World's Fighting Ships 1906–1921. Annapolis, Maryland: Naval Institute Press. ISBN 0-85177-245-5.
- Lenton, H. T. (1998). British & Empire Warships of the Second World War. Annapolis, Maryland: Naval Institute Press. ISBN 1-55750-048-7.
- March, Edgar J. (1966). British Destroyers: A History of Development, 1892–1953; Drawn by Admiralty Permission From Official Records & Returns, Ships' Covers & Building Plans. London: Seeley Service. OCLC 164893555.
- Preston, Antony (1971). 'V & W' Class Destroyers 1917–1945. London: Macdonald. OCLC 464542895.
- Raven, Alan & Roberts, John (1979). 'V' and 'W' Class Destroyers. Man o'War. Vol. 2. London: Arms & Armour. ISBN 0-85368-233-X.
- Rohwer, Jürgen (2005). Chronology of the War at Sea 1939–1945: The Naval History of World War Two (Third Revised ed.). Annapolis, Maryland: Naval Institute Press. ISBN 1-59114-119-2.
- Whinney, Bob (2000). The U-boat Peril: A Fight for Survival. Cassell. ISBN 0-304-35132-6.
- Whitley, M. J. (1988). Destroyers of World War 2. Annapolis, Maryland: Naval Institute Press. ISBN 0-87021-326-1.
- Winser, John de D. (1999). B.E.F. Ships Before, At and After Dunkirk. Gravesend, Kent: World Ship Society. ISBN 0-905617-91-6.
