= HMS Wolsey =

Destroyer of the Royal Navy

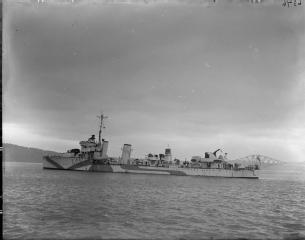
- HMS Wolsey during World War II.

History

United Kingdom
- Name: HMS Wolsey
- Ordered: 9 December 1916
- Builder: John I. Thornycroft & Company, Woolston, Hampshire
- Laid down: 28 March 1917
- Launched: 16 March 1918
- Completed: 14 May 1918
- Commissioned: 14 May 1918
- Decommissioned: 1930s
- Identification: Pennant number: G40 (June 1918); D98 (interwar); L02 (January 1940)
- Motto: Quo majores ducunt: 'Where our forefathers lead we follow'
- Recommissioned: January 1940
- Decommissioned: summer 1945
- Motto: To the last penny, 'tis the King's
- Honours and awards: Battle honours for: Dunkirk 1940; Atlantic 1940–1942; North Sea 1939–1945; English Channel 1943
- Fate: Sold 4 March 1947 for scrapping
- Badge: A blue leopard's face on a white field

General characteristics
- Class & type: Admiralty W-class destroyer
- Displacement: 1,120 tons standard
- Length: 300 ft (91 m) o/a, 312 ft (95 m) p/p
- Beam: 30 ft 6 in (9.30 m)
- Draught: 10 ft 6 in (3.20 m)
- Propulsion: 3 Yarrow type Water-tube boilers, Brown-Curtis steam turbines, 2 shafts, 30,000 shp
- Speed: 36-knot (67 km/h)
- Range: 320–370 tons oil, 3,500 nmi (6,500 km) at 15 knots (28 km/h), 900 nmi (1,700 km) at 32 knots (59 km/h)
- Complement: 134
- Armament: 4 × QF 4 in Mk V (102mm L/45), mount P Mk.I; 1 × QF 3-inch 20 cwt Mk.I (76 mm), mount HA Mk.II; 6 (3x2) tubes for 21 in torpedoes

HMS Wolsey (D98) was a W-class destroyer of the British Royal Navy that saw service in the final months of World War I, in the Nanking incident of 1927, and in World War II.

== Construction and commissioning ==
Wolsey, the first Royal Navy ship of the name, was ordered on 9 December 1916 as part of the 10th Order of the 1916–1917 Naval Programme and was laid down by John I. Thornycroft & Company at Woolston, Hampshire, England, on 28 March 1917. Launched on 16 March 1918, she was completed on 14 May 1918 and commissioned the same day. Her original pennant number became G40 in June 1918; it was changed to D98 during the interwar period.

== Service history ==
=== World War I ===
Upon completion, Wolsey was assigned to the Grand Fleet, based at Scapa Flow in the Orkney Islands, in which she served for the rest of World War I.

=== Interwar ===
After the conclusion of World War I, Wolsey served in the Atlantic Fleet. In the late 1920s, she operated on the China Station. After the British river steamer SS Kutwo collided with and sank a Chinese troop-carrying launch on the Yangtze River and Chinese authorities threatened to seize her at Nanjing in early March 1927, Wolsey arrived on the scene and came alongside Kutwo to repel by force any Chinese attempt to board her, and Wolsey's sailors also boarded a British hulk nearby and forced off Chinese students who had boarded it to stage a demonstration; the light cruiser Emerald soon joined Wolsey at Nanjing as a reinforcement. During the Nanking Incident, Wolsey steamed at full speed from Wuhu to Nanjing on 24 March 1927 to reinforce Emerald and the United States Navy destroyers USS Noa (DD-343) and USS William B. Preston (DD-344) and patrol yacht USS Isabel (PY-10) as they confronted Chinese troops threatening foreigners ashore; she arrived as the other ships opened fire on Chinese positions and, without a target designation for her larger guns, used her machine guns against Chinese snipers which had harassed the other ships and their boats all day. She remained at Nanjing, prepared for further action, until all foreign refugees were safely aboard the ships on the evening of 25 March 1927.

By the early 1930s, Wolsey was part of the Mediterranean Fleet. She later was decommissioned and placed in reserve at Malta.

In 1938, the Royal Navy selected her for conversion into an antiaircraft escort destroyer at the Royal Navy Dockyard at Valletta, Malta.

=== World War II ===
==== January – June 1940 ====
Wolsey still was undergoing her conversion and a refit at Malta when the United Kingdom entered World War II on 3 September 1939. In January 1940 she began post-conversion acceptance trials and pre-deployment work-ups at Malta. With all work completed on 21 January 1940, her pennant number was changed to L02, and she was selected for service in home waters. She proceeded from Malta to Gibraltar, where on 29 January 1940, she and the sloop Lowestoft began a voyage to Liverpool as the escort of Convoy HG 17F. Reinforced during the voyage by the sloop Sandwich on 31 January and by the destroyers Broke and Winchelsea from 4 to 5 February, Wolsey and Lowestoft escorted the convoy until its arrival at Liverpool on 7 February 1940.

After her arrival at Liverpool, Wolsey was assigned to Western Approaches Command and began convoy escort and patrol duty in the Western Approaches. On 10 May 1940, she was transferred to the Commander-in-Chief, Dover to support Allied military operations during the German offensive into France, Luxembourg, Belgium, and the Netherlands that began that month. On 13 May, she and the destroyers Boreas, Keith, and Wivern escorted a convoy bringing reinforcements from the United Kingdom for French antiaircraft defenses in ports along the English Channel, and later the same day embarked demolition parties and carried them to Le Havre, France, to destroy port facilities there before advancing German Army forces captured them. On 16 May, she and the destroyer Vimiera bombarded German ground forces at Escault in Offrethun, France, and Wolsey again bombarded Escault on 17 May. On 22 May she and the destroyer Vimy escorted the cargo ship City of Christchurch as City of Christchurch carried heavy motor vehicles and tanks from Southampton to Calais, France. On 23 May, Wolsey embarked a demolition party for Le Havre and then steamed to Calais to assist in the evacuation of British citizens before returning to Dover. On 25 May, she and the destroyer Wolfhound engaged German 150-mm (5.9-inch) howitzers in defence of the evacuation of Calais.

On 26 May 1940, Wolsey was assigned to Operation Dynamo, the evacuation of Allied troops from the beaches at Dunkirk, France. She embarked evacuees from small craft offshore on 27 May and disembarked 102 evacuated troops at Dover on 28 May. She delivered another 315 troops from Dunkirk at Dover on 29 May. On 30 May, she made two evacuation voyages, carrying 616 troops to Dover on the first one and 1,065 on the second. On 31 May while at Dunkirk, she suffered damage when a fire broke out in her degaussing equipment and in a collision with a merchant ship, but despite her damage she deployed offshore to serve as a wireless transmitter link between Dunkirk and Dover and later in the day landed 425 evacuated troops at Dover. She carried another 535 troops from Dunkirk to Dover on 1 June before being withdrawn from evacuation operations later in the day for repairs.

==== June 1940-Summer 1945 ====
Wolsey proceeded to Portsmouth on 2 June 1940, where she entered the Royal Navy Dockyard on 3 June for repairs. Upon their completion, she began convoy defence operations and anti-invasion patrols in the North Sea in July 1940. In August 1940, she returned to convoy escort duty with the Western Approaches Command.

In January 1941, Wolsey was transferred to the Rosyth Escort Force based at Rosyth, Scotland, to escort coastal convoys in the North Sea and Northwestern Approaches. By October 1941, these duties increasingly included operations to intercept German motor torpedo boats – S-boats, known to the Allies as "E-boats" – before they could attack the convoys. On 12 October 1941, she was part of the escort of the northbound coastal convoy FN 31 in the North Sea along with the destroyer Westminster from the Rosyth Escort Force, the escort destroyer Cotswold from Harwich, and motor gunboats of the Royal Navy Coastal Forces when nine German E-boats of the 2nd Flotilla attacked, sinking the merchant ships SS Chevington and SS Roy; the escorts engaged the E-boats and gave chase as they withdrew, but were unable to destroy any of them. On 19 November 1941, Wolsey joined the southbound coastal convoy FS 50 to escort it to the Thames Estuary along with the destroyers Campbell, Vesper, and Verdun, the escort destroyers Garth and Quorn, and the corvettes Kittiwake and Widgeon. On 20 November, the convoy came under heavy attack by 2nd Flotilla E-boats, which sank the colliers Aruba and Waldinge and the Royal Fleet Auxiliary tanker RFA War Mehtar; the latter, at 11,681 gross register tons, was the largest ship sunk by an E-boat in the North Sea during World War II.

Wolsey was "adopted" by the civil community of Spennymoor in County Durham, England, in a Warship Week national savings campaign in December 1941. She continued on convoy escort and patrol duty in the North Sea – having radar and radio telephone equipment installed in 1942 to improve her ability to detect German aircraft and small surface craft and give her a greater capability to warn other ships of the approach of enemy aircraft and ships and to communicate while manoeuvering – without further major incident until the surrender of Germany in early May 1945. She took no part in any operations related to the Allied invasion of Normandy in the summer of 1944.

After Germany's surrender, Wolsey supported Allied forces reoccupying Norway, and on 14 May 1945 joined the destroyer HMS Vivacious (D36) in escorting minesweepers as they cleared the entrance to Stavanger.

== Decommissioning and disposal ==
Wolsey was decommissioned in the summer of 1945 and transferred to the reserve; by October 1945 she was no longer on the Royal Navy's active list. She was placed on the disposal list in 1946 and sold on 4 March 1947 to BISCO for scrapping. She later was towed to the yard of T. Young and Company at Sunderland to be broken up.

== Bibliography ==
- Campbell, John (1985). Naval Weapons of World War II. Annapolis, Maryland: Naval Institute Press. ISBN 0-87021-459-4.
- Chesneau, Roger, ed. (1980). Conway's All the World's Fighting Ships 1922–1946. Greenwich, UK: Conway Maritime Press. ISBN 0-85177-146-7.
- Colledge, J. J.; Warlow, Ben (2006) [1969]. Ships of the Royal Navy: The Complete Record of All Fighting Ships of the Royal Navy from the 15th Century to the Present (3rd Rev ed.). London: Chatham Publishing. ISBN 978-1-86176-281-8. OCLC 67375475.
- Cocker, Maurice. Destroyers of the Royal Navy, 1893–1981. Ian Allan. ISBN 0-7110-1075-7.
- Friedman, Norman (2009). British Destroyers From Earliest Days to the Second World War. Annapolis, Maryland: Naval Institute Press. ISBN 978-1-59114-081-8.
- Gardiner, Robert & Gray, Randal, eds. (1985). Conway's All the World's Fighting Ships 1906–1921. Annapolis, Maryland: Naval Institute Press. ISBN 0-85177-245-5.
- Lenton, H. T. (1998). British & Empire Warships of the Second World War. Annapolis, Maryland: Naval Institute Press. ISBN 1-55750-048-7.
- March, Edgar J. (1966). British Destroyers: A History of Development, 1892–1953; Drawn by Admiralty Permission From Official Records & Returns, Ships' Covers & Building Plans. London: Seeley Service. OCLC 164893555.
- Preston, Antony (1971). 'V & W' Class Destroyers 1917–1945. London: Macdonald. OCLC 464542895.
- Raven, Alan & Roberts, John (1979). 'V' and 'W' Class Destroyers. Man o'War. Vol. 2. London: Arms & Armour. ISBN 0-85368-233-X.
- Rohwer, Jürgen (2005). Chronology of the War at Sea 1939–1945: The Naval History of World War Two (Third Revised ed.). Annapolis, Maryland: Naval Institute Press. ISBN 1-59114-119-2.
- Whinney, Bob (2000). The U-boat Peril: A Fight for Survival. Cassell. ISBN 0-304-35132-6.
- Whitley, M. J. (1988). Destroyers of World War 2. Annapolis, Maryland: Naval Institute Press. ISBN 0-87021-326-1.
- Winser, John de D. (1999). B.E.F. Ships Before, At and After Dunkirk. Gravesend, Kent: World Ship Society. ISBN 0-905617-91-6.
