= HMS Whitley =

Destroyer of the Royal Navy

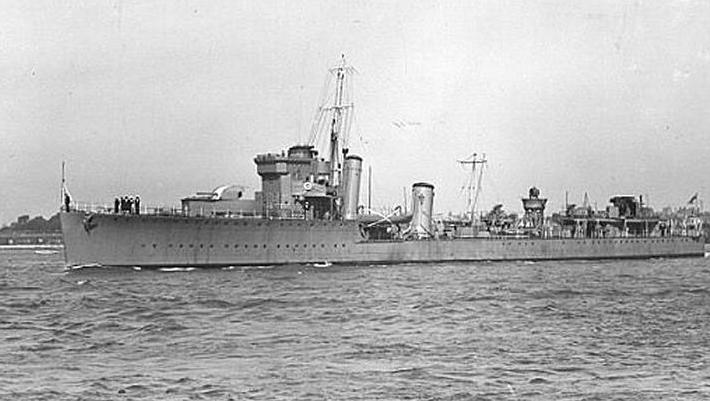
- HMS Whitley (L 23)

History

United Kingdom
- Name: HMS Whitby
- Ordered: 9 December 1916
- Builder: William Doxford & Sons, Sunderland
- Laid down: June 1917
- Renamed: HMS Whitley
- Namesake: Misspelling of originally intended name "Whitby"
- Launched: 13 April 1918
- Completed: 11 October 1918
- Commissioned: 14 October 1918
- Decommissioned: 1921
- Recommissioned: 1923
- Decommissioned: 1932
- Recommissioned: 1939
- Identification: Pennant number L23
- Motto: Silence is golden
- Fate: Beached 19 May 1940; scuttled
- Badge: The Mace of the Speaker of the House of Commons on a red field

General characteristics
- Displacement: 1,100 tons
- Length: 300 ft (91 m) o/a, 312 ft (95 m)p/p
- Beam: 26.75 ft (8.15 m)
- Draught: 9 ft (2.7 m) standard, 11.25 ft (3.43 m) in deep
- Propulsion: 3 Yarrow type Water-tube boilers; Brown-Curtis steam turbines; 2 shafts; 27,000 shp (20,000 kW)
- Speed: 34 knots (63 km/h; 39 mph)
- Range: 320–370 tons oil, 3,500 nmi (6,500 km) at 15 knots (28 km/h; 17 mph), 900 nmi (1,700 km) at 32 knots (59 km/h; 37 mph)
- Complement: 110
- Armament: 4 × QF 4 in Mk.V (102mm L/45), mount P Mk.I; 2 × QF 2 pdr Mk.II "pom-pom" (40 mm L/39) or; 1 × QF 3 inch 20 cwt (76 mm), mount HA Mk.II; 6 (2x3) tubes for 21 in torpedoes

HMS Whitley (L23), ex-Whitby, was a W-class destroyer of the British Royal Navy that saw service in the British campaign in the Baltic Sea against Bolshevik forces during the Russian Civil War and in the early months of World War II.

== Construction and commissioning ==
Whitley was ordered as HMS Whitby on 9 December 1916 as part of the 10th Order of the 1916–1917 Naval Programme and was laid down by William Doxford & Sons at Sunderland in June 1917. When it was discovered that the name "Whitby" had mistakenly been written as "Whitley" when it was chosen for her, it was decided not to correct it, and she was launched as HMS Whitley, the first Royal Navy ship of the name, on 13 April 1918. She was completed on 11 October 1918, exactly one month before the conclusion of World War I, and commissioned on 14 October 1918.

== Service history ==
=== 1918–1939 ===
After acceptance trials and work-ups, Whitley deployed in 1919 to the Baltic Sea, where she served in the British campaign against Bolshevik forces during the Russian Civil War. She returned from the Baltic in 1920. In 1921, she was decommissioned and placed in reserve at Rosyth, Scotland, as part of the 9th Destroyer Flotilla.

Whitley was recommissioned at Chatham on 4 December 1923 to serve with the 9th Destroyer Flotilla in the Atlantic Fleet. She recommissioned with a reserve crew on 23 November 1925.

Whitley commissioned at Portsmouth on 14 December 1928 for service with the 5th Destroyer Flotilla in the Atlantic Ocean. She recommissioned at Chatham on 8 May 1929 for service with the 1st Destroyer Flotilla in the Mediterranean Sea. She was reduced to reserve at the Nore on 30 June 1932, and paid into maintenance reserve at Rosyth on 28 October 1933.

In 1938, Whitley was selected for conversion to an anti-aircraft escort, and began conversion for her new role at Chatham Dockyard in August 1938. Her conversion was completed in October 1938 and she was recommissioned in 1939.

=== World War II ===
The United Kingdom entered World War II in September 1939, and that month Whitley was assigned to duty escorting convoys in the North Sea along the east coast of Great Britain, which she continued through April 1940. While escorting Convoy FN 12 from the Thames Estuary to the Forth Estuary on 12 January 1940, she assisted in driving off a German air attack.

In May 1940, Whitley was transferred under the command of the Commander-in-Chief, Dover, and was placed at the disposal of the French Navy for operations in support of Allied ground operations in France and Belgium. She was thus engaged on 19 May 1940 when a German dive bomber attack badly damaged her 2 nautical miles (3.7 km; 2.3 mi) off Nieuwpoort, Belgium, forcing her to beach herself on the Belgian coast between Nieuwpoort and La Panne to avoid sinking. To prevent her capture by advancing German ground forces, the British destroyer HMS Keith destroyed her with gunfire at position 51°09′04″N 002°39′34″E, leaving her wreck on the bottom in 5 metres (16.4 ft) of water.

== Bibliography ==
- Campbell, John (1985). Naval Weapons of World War II. Annapolis, Maryland: Naval Institute Press. ISBN 0-87021-459-4.
- Chesneau, Roger, ed. (1980). Conway's All the World's Fighting Ships 1922–1946. Greenwich, UK: Conway Maritime Press. ISBN 0-85177-146-7.
- Colledge, J. J.; Warlow, Ben (2006) [1969]. Ships of the Royal Navy: The Complete Record of All Fighting Ships of the Royal Navy from the 15th Century to the Present (3rd Rev ed.). London: Chatham Publishing. ISBN 978-1-86176-281-8. OCLC 67375475.
- Cocker, Maurice. Destroyers of the Royal Navy, 1893–1981. Ian Allan. ISBN 0-7110-1075-7.
- Friedman, Norman (2009). British Destroyers From Earliest Days to the Second World War. Annapolis, Maryland: Naval Institute Press. ISBN 978-1-59114-081-8.
- Gardiner, Robert & Gray, Randal, eds. (1985). Conway's All the World's Fighting Ships 1906–1921. Annapolis, Maryland: Naval Institute Press. ISBN 0-85177-245-5.
- Lenton, H. T. (1998). British & Empire Warships of the Second World War. Annapolis, Maryland: Naval Institute Press. ISBN 1-55750-048-7.
- March, Edgar J. (1966). British Destroyers: A History of Development, 1892–1953; Drawn by Admiralty Permission From Official Records & Returns, Ships' Covers & Building Plans. London: Seeley Service. OCLC 164893555.
- Preston, Antony (1971). 'V & W' Class Destroyers 1917–1945. London: Macdonald. OCLC 464542895.
- Raven, Alan & Roberts, John (1979). 'V' and 'W' Class Destroyers. Man o'War. Vol. 2. London: Arms & Armour. ISBN 0-85368-233-X.
- Rohwer, Jürgen (2005). Chronology of the War at Sea 1939–1945: The Naval History of World War Two (Third Revised ed.). Annapolis, Maryland: Naval Institute Press. ISBN 1-59114-119-2.
- Whinney, Bob (2000). The U-boat Peril: A Fight for Survival. Cassell. ISBN 0-304-35132-6.
- Whitley, M. J. (1988). Destroyers of World War 2. Annapolis, Maryland: Naval Institute Press. ISBN 0-87021-326-1.
- Winser, John de D. (1999). B.E.F. Ships Before, At and After Dunkirk. Gravesend, Kent: World Ship Society. ISBN 0-905617-91-6.
