= HMS Montrose (D01) =

Scott class, Admiralty type flotilla leader

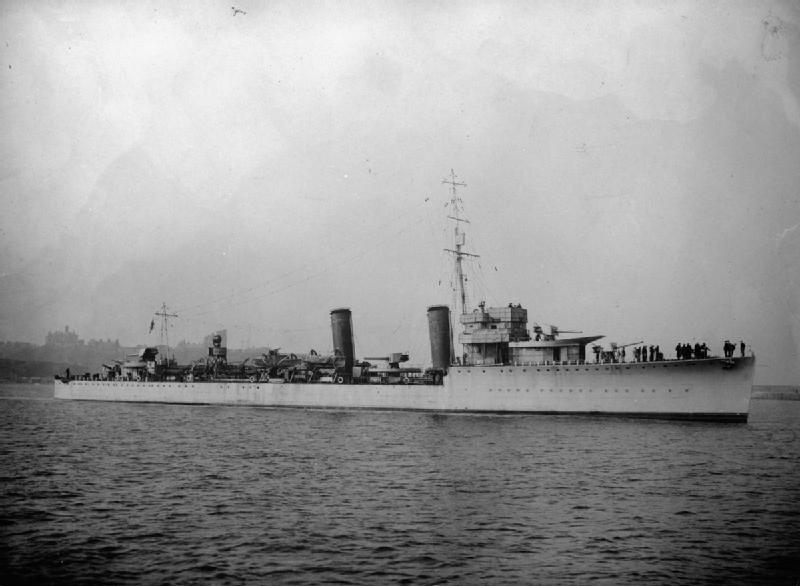
- HMS Montrose

History

United Kingdom
- Name: HMS Montrose
- Laid down: 27 March 1918
- Launched: 29 May 1919
- Commissioned: 14 December 1919
- Honours and awards: Atlantic 1939–40; Dunkirk 1940; Arctic 1942–43; North Sea 1942–44; English Channel 1943–44; Normandy 1944
- Fate: Sold to be broken up for scrap on 25 July 1945

General characteristics
- Class & type: Admiralty-type destroyer leader
- Displacement: 1,530 tons
- Length: 320 ft (98 m)
- Beam: 31 ft (9.4 m)
- Draught: 14 ft (4.3 m)
- Propulsion: Parsons Turbines, 2 shafts, Yarrow Boilers 40,000 hp (30 MW)
- Speed: 36.5 knots
- Complement: 164
- Armament: 2 × BL 4.7-inch (120mm) guns; 2 × 6 pdr 10cwt guns (twin bow turret); 1 × 4-inch gun; 2 × 2-pounder guns; 5 × 20 mm guns

The first HMS Montrose was one of eight Admiralty-type destroyer leaders, sometimes known as the Scott class. They were named after figures from Scottish history; Montrose was named for the Graham Dukes of Montrose. She was built during the First World War, but was completed too late for service then. However, she had a long career in the inter-war years and saw extensive service during the Second World War.

== Construction ==
Montrose was ordered under the Wartime Emergency Construction Programme in April 1917, from Hawthorn Leslie of Hebburn. She was laid down at Hawthorn Leslie's Hebburn-on-Tyne shipyard on 4 October 1917, launched on 10 June 1918, commissioned on 29 August 1918 and completed on 14 September that year.

== Design ==
HMS Montrose was one of five Admiralty type flotilla leaders ordered from Cammell Laird in April 1917. (Note: The other four ships were Mackay, Malcolm, Campbell and Stuart. Three more ships of the class Scott, Bruce and Douglas had been ordered earlier.) The Admiralty type, or Scott-class, were designed to meet a requirement from Admiral Sir John Jellicoe, commander of the Grand Fleet, for a large, fast and heavily armed leader to match and outclass rumoured large German destroyers.

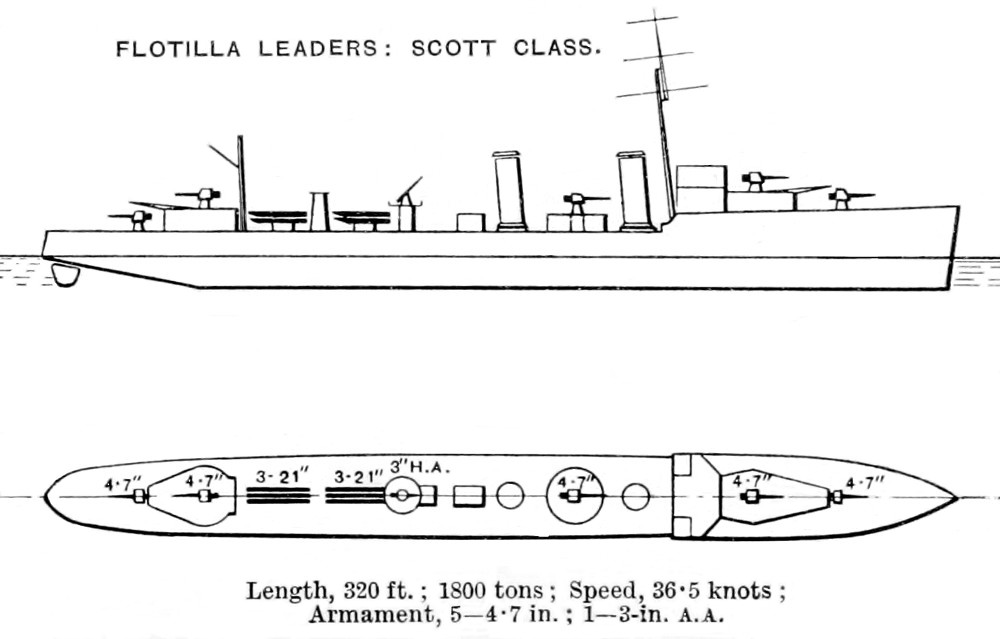
Layout of Admiralty type leader

The ship was 320 feet 0 inches (97.54 m) long between perpendiculars and 332 feet 5 inches (101.32 m) overall, with a beam of 31 feet 9 inches (9.68 m) and a draught of 12 feet 6 inches (3.81 m). Design displacement was 1,580 long tons (1,610 t) normal and 2,050 long tons (2,080 t) full load. The ship's machinery consisted of four Yarrow boilers that fed steam at 250 pounds per square inch (1,700 kPa) to two sets of Brown-Curtis single-reduction geared-steam turbines, rated at 43,000 shaft horsepower (32,000 kW). This gave a design speed of 36.5 knots (67.6 km/h; 42.0 mph) light, which corresponded to about 32 knots (59 km/h; 37 mph) at full load. Up to 504 tons of oil fuel could be carried, giving a range of 5,000 nautical miles (9,300 km; 5,800 mi) at 15 knots (28 km/h; 17 mph).

The class had a main gun armament consisted of five 4.7 in (120 mm)/45 calibre BL Mark I guns, (Note: In British practice, BL (Breech Loading) indicated that a separate, bagged, charge was used.) on CP VI mountings capable of elevating to 30 degrees, arranged in two superfiring pairs fore and aft of the superstructure with the remaining gun positioned on a platform between the funnels. Anti-aircraft armament consisted of a single 3 in (76 mm) gun on a platform abaft the rear funnel together with a pair of single two-pounder (40mm) pom-pom autocannon for close-in protection on single mounts. Torpedo armament consisted of two triple mounts for 21-inch (533 mm) torpedo tubes between the 3-inch AA gun and the rear pair of 4.7-inch guns.

=== Modifications ===
While Montrose had only limited modifications between the wars, an early change during the Second World War was the replacement of the amidships 4.7-inch gun by two 2-pounder (40 mm) "pom-pom" autocannon, with the aft funnel shortened to improve the field of fire for the 3-inch anti-aircraft gun. In 1941 or 1942, the 3-inch anti aircraft gun was moved aft to X-position, with two 20 mm Oerlikon autocannon were mounted on the ship's bridge wings. Both sets of torpedo tubes were retained, while the ship was fitted to launch a 10-depth charge pattern. Type 271 radar was mounted above the ship's bridge, replacing the low-angle director and associated rangefinder, while Type 291 radar was mounted at the top of the ship's mast. In 1943, a twin 6-pounder (57 mm) replaced the 4.7-inch gun at A-position, for use against German E-boats.

== Service history ==
After completion, Montrose joined the 10th Destroyer Flotilla, the destroyer component of the Harwich Force, as one of four leaders for this large flotilla, replacing sister ship Scott, which had been sunk on 15 August that year. (Note: In addition to the four leaders (Spenser, Bruce, Montrose and Shakespeare), the flotilla comprised 24 destroyers.) On 1 October 1918, in response to reports of German naval forces evacuating their bases in German-occupied Flanders, Montrose, along with five destroyers, were ordered to patrol off the Schouwen Bank, while the cruisers Canterbury, Dragon waited off the Texel, in order to intercept any German heading for Germany. Significant German forces (including 28 destroyers) managed to successfully escape to German waters without being spotted, using Dutch territorial waters to avoid the blockading British.

=== Mediterranean Fleet ===
Montrose remained with the 10th Flotilla until February 1919, when she joined the Mediterranean Fleet, as part of the 6th Destroyer Flotilla. The ship continued to operate as part of the Mediterranean Fleet for ten years. Montrose operated in the Black Sea during 1919–1920, during the Russian Civil War, taking part in the evacuation of soldiers and refugees from Sevastopol to Novorossiysk in April 1919. In May–June 1919, she took part in operations off Feodosia and Arabat Spit, supporting White Army forces in the Kerch Peninsula, and shelling Red Army troops. In December 1919, Montrose's commanding officer, Captain Malcolm Lennon Goldsmith, was awarded a bar to the Distinguished Service Order for his service in command of Montrose in the Black Sea. In March 1920, Montrose assisted in the evacuation of the remnants of the White Army at Novorossiysk. Many other Royal Navy warships assisted in the evacuation, along with British forces on land. On 29 March, Montrose took off refugees from Yalta.

Montrose recommissioned at Malta with a fresh crew on 16 June 1920. In September 1922, Montrose was stationed at Çanakkale on the Dardanelles during the Chanak Crisis, when Turkey confronted British and French forces occupying the Dardanelles and Constantinople. In May 1923, Montrose was part of a force, led by the battleship Iron Duke, with the cruiser Centaur and five more destroyers, that were ordered from Malta to the Dardanelles as hostilities between Greece and Turkey were feared to be about to restart, with the peace treaty negotiations at Lausanne threatening to break down. In October 1923, she joined the 4th Destroyer Flotilla, based at Malta, as leader. In February 1925, Montrose transferred to the 5th Destroyer Flotilla, again serving as leader until transferring to the 1st Destroyer Flotilla in January 1927. On 20 June 1927, Montrose led the destroyers of the 1st Flotilla as they escorted Renown as the battlecruiser left Malta carrying the Duke (Note: Who later became King George VI) and Duchess of York on their tour of the Commonwealth.

=== Home waters ===
She finally returned to Britain in April 1929, and was refitted at Devonport from May to November that year, having her boilers retubed, before going into reserve at Sheerness. On 4 December 1930, Montrose was recommissioned into the 6th Destroyer Flotilla, now part of Atlantic Fleet, serving as leader until June 1931, when she returned to reserve at Portsmouth. In November 1931, she recommissioned as leader of the 5th Destroyer Flotilla, before reducing to reserve at Devonport in June 1932. Montrose recommissioned on 10 July 1935, for local service in the English Channel, unattached to any destroyer flotilla, and in September 1935 joined the newly established 20th Destroyer Flotilla, formed with destroyers raised from reserve in order to replace destroyers sent to the Mediterranean during the Abyssinia Crisis. She was refitted at Devonport from 22 November 1935 and 13 January 1936, returning to active service on its completion. Duties including escorting dignitaries to and from the funeral of King George V in January 1936. The ship returned to reserve at Devonport on 1 May 1936.

=== Second World War ===
On the outbreak of the Second World War in September 1939, Montrose was made leader of the 17th Destroyer Flotilla, based at Milford Haven and part of the Western Approaches Command, and for the first few months back in active service was tasked with anti-submarine patrols and convoy escort in the East Atlantic. On 30 September 1939, Montrose attacked a suspected German submarine south of Plymouth, and on 2 October 1939, Montrose and the destroyer Keith attacked another suspected submarine.

On 26 May 1940, Operation Dynamo, the Evacuation of Dunkirk, began, with Montrose being ordered to take part. On 28 May she successfully evacuated 925 troops, landing them at Dover. She was heading out on another run to Dunkirk early in the morning of 29 May when she collided in a fog bank with the tug Sun V, breaking the destroyer's stem. Montrose had to be towed back to Dover stern-first by the tug Lady Brassey. Montrose was under repair at Harland and Wolff's North Woolwich yard from 31 May to 5 July 1940. After repair, Montrose joined the 18th Destroyer Flotilla, Nore Command, based at Harwich. In July 1940, in the first part of the Battle of Britain, German aircraft carried out a campaign of attacks against coastal shipping in the English Channel, and on 27 July, as part of this campaign, attacked Montrose and the destroyer Wren, which were escorting minesweepers off Aldeburgh, Suffolk. Montrose claimed two German bombers shot down during the engagement, but was badly damaged by near-misses which immobilised her, while Wren was sunk. Montrose had to be towed back to Sheerness.

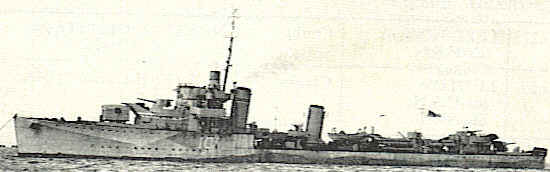
Montrose in 1944, with the twin 6-pounder mount in A-position

Montrose was under repair at Chatham Dockyard until October 1941, being reallocated to the 16th Destroyer Flotilla. She worked up at Scapa Flow until November 1941, In December 1941, the ship was detached from her flotilla to form part of the covering force for Operations Anklet and Archery, raids on Lofoten and Vågsøy in northern Norway. On 30 December, Montrose hit a rock off Herston, Orkney, damaging her port propeller shaft. She was under repair at Rosyth until the end of May 1942.

On 1 August 1942, Montrose was detached to the Home Fleet to replace destroyers sent to the Mediterranean for the important Malta Convoy, Operation Pedestal. Montrose formed part of the distant covering force for the Arctic convoys PQ 18 and QP 14 in September 1942, while in December 1942 – January 1943 was part of the distant escort of convoys RA 51 and JW 52. On 1 February 1943, she left Scapa for the Nore Command, resuming coastal patrols and convoy escort duties off the east coast of Britain. On the night of 17/18 February 1943, Montrose and the Hunt-class destroyer Garth were on patrol when they encountered several German E-boats that were laying a minefield off Lowestoft. In the resulting engagement, one of the German torpedo boats, S71, was immobilised and then rammed and sunk by Garth. On 24 October 1943, Montrose collided with the Hunt-class destroyer Cotswold, badly damaging Cotswold, which was under repair for over 6 months.

In June 1944, Montrose took part in supporting the Normandy Landings. She left Harwich on 5 June, and was escorting follow-on convoys to the Eastern (British) operating area from 6 June. She was awarded the ship's last battle honour during these operations. On 7 July, Montrose's stern was damaged when the ship was in collision with the cargo ship Empire Heywood off Harwich. Montrose suffered more serious damage on 19 July when she collided with the landing ship LST-430 and was docked at the Port of Immingham for repairs. Montrose did not re-enter service, and was instead placed into Category C Reserve on 2 November 1944. (Note: Category C Reserve meant that the ship was unlikely to be commissioned for further service.) Montrose was allocated by BISCO to Hughes Bolckow Ltd for disposal on 31 January 1946 and scrapped at Blyth in Northumberland.

== Pennant numbers ==
Pennant number	From	To
F45	September 1918	November 1918
D01	1922	1940
I01	1940	1946
