= HMS Mackay =

Scott class, Admiralty type flotilla leader

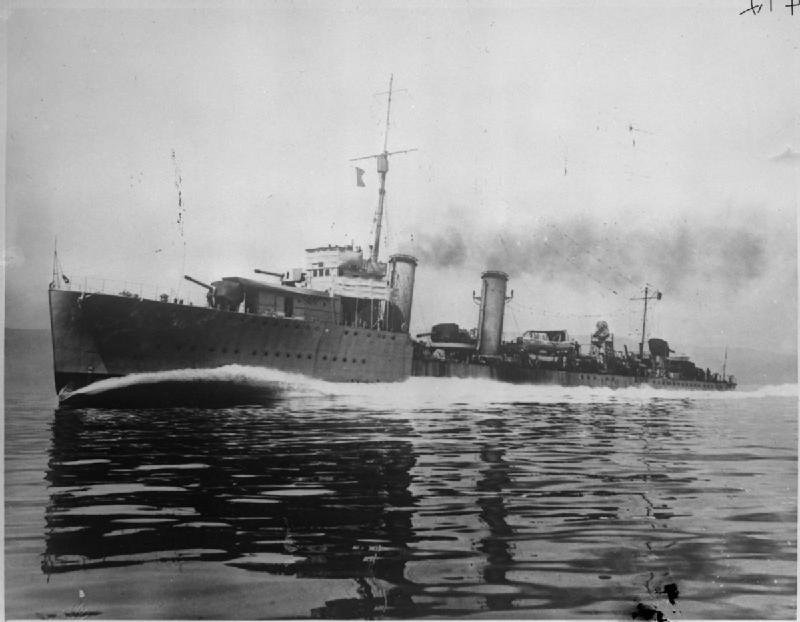
- HMS Mackay

History

United Kingdom
- Name: HMS Mackay
- Builder: Cammell Laird, Birkenhead
- Laid down: 5 March 1918
- Launched: 21 December 1918
- Commissioned: June 1919
- Fate: Scrapped June 1949

General characteristics
- Class & type: Admiralty-type flotilla leader
- Displacement: 1,801 long tons (1,830 t)
- Length: 332 ft 6 in (101.35 m)
- Beam: 31 ft 9 in (9.68 m)
- Draught: 12 ft 6 in (3.81 m)
- Installed power: 40,000 shp (30,000 kW)
- Propulsion: 2 ×Parsons Turbines; 2 shafts
- Speed: 36.5 knots
- Armament: 5 × BL 4.7-inch (120 mm) guns; 1 × 3 in (76 mm) anti-aircraft gun; 2 × 2-pounder guns

HMS Mackay was an Admiralty type, sometimes known as the Scott class, flotilla leader of the British Royal Navy. Mackay was built by Cammell Laird during the First World War, but was completed too late for service then, commissioning in 1919.

Mackay took part in the British campaign in the Baltic during the Russian Civil War, and was still in service at the start of the Second World War. The ship took part in the Dunkirk evacuation in 1940 and the Normandy landings in 1944, spending most of the rest of the war operating on the East coast of Britain. Mackay was scrapped from June 1949.

== Design and construction ==
HMS Mackay was one of five Admiralty type flotilla leaders ordered from Cammell Laird in April 1917. (Note: The other four ships were Montrose, Malcolm, Campbell and Stuart. Three more ships of the class Scott, Bruce and Douglas had been ordered earlier.) The Admiralty type, or Scott class, were designed to meet a requirement from Admiral Sir John Jellicoe, commander of the Grand Fleet, for a large, fast and heavily armed leader to match and outclass rumoured large German destroyers.

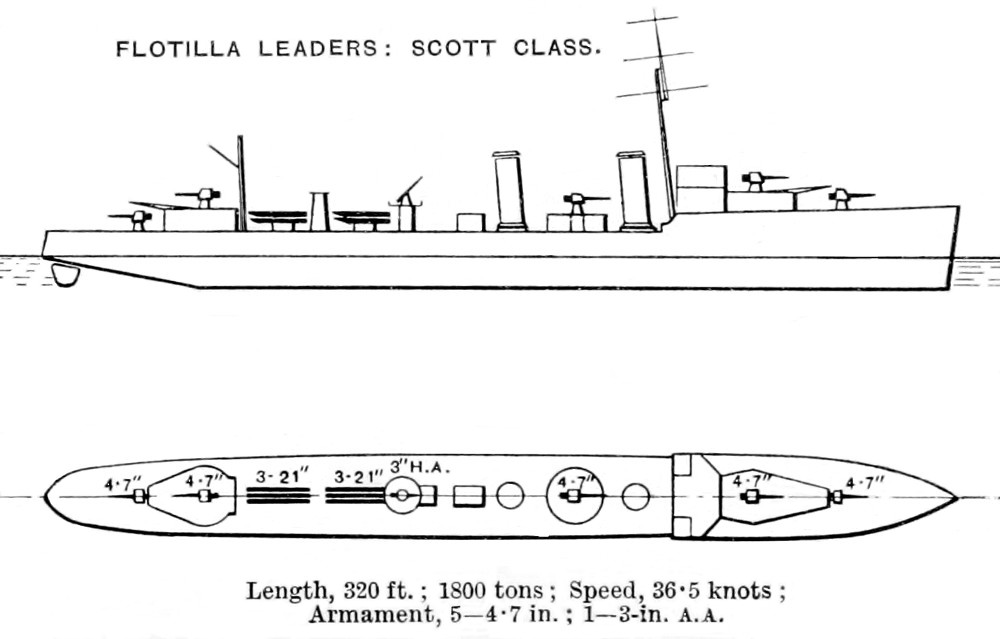
Layout of Admiralty type leader

The ship was 320 feet 0 inches (97.54 m) long between perpendiculars and 332 feet 5 inches (101.32 m) overall, with a beam of 31 feet 9 inches (9.68 m) and a draught of 12 feet 6 inches (3.81 m). Design displacement was 1,580 long tons (1,610 t) normal and 2,050 long tons (2,080 t) full load. The ship's machinery consisted of four Yarrow boilers that fed steam at 250 pounds per square inch (1,700 kPa) to two sets of Parsons single-reduction geared-steam turbines, rated at 40,000 shaft horsepower (30,000 kW). This gave a design speed of 36.5 knots (67.6 km/h; 42.0 mph) light, which corresponded to about 32 knots (59 km/h; 37 mph) at full load. Up to 504 tons of oil fuel could be carried, giving a range of 5,000 nautical miles (9,300 km; 5,800 mi) at 15 knots (28 km/h; 17 mph).

The class had a main gun armament consisted of five 4.7 in (120 mm)/45 calibre BL Mark I guns, (Note: In British practice, BL (Breech Loading) indicated that a separate, bagged, charge was used.) on CP VI mountings capable of elevating to 30 degrees, arranged in two superfiring pairs fore and aft of the superstructure with the remaining gun positioned on a platform between the funnels. Anti-aircraft armament consisted of a single 3 in (76 mm) gun on a platform abaft the rear funnel together with a pair of single two-pounder (40mm) pom-pom autocannon for close-in protection on single mounts. Torpedo armament consisted of two triple mounts for 21-inch (533 mm) torpedo tubes between the 3-inch AA gun and the rear pair of 4.7-inch guns.

Mackay was laid down with the name Calverhouse at Laird's Birkenhead shipyard on 5 March 1918. The ship was renamed Mackay (after the Scottish clan) on 18 December 1918, and was launched on 21 December that year. She was commissioned in June 1919.

=== Modifications ===
While Mackay had only limited modifications between the wars, an early change during the Second World War was the replacement of the amidships 4.7-inch gun by two 2-pounder (40 mm) "pom-pom" autocannon, with the aft funnel shortened to improve the field of fire for the 3 inch anti-aircraft gun. In 1941 or 1942, the 3-inch anti aircraft gun was moved aft to X-position, with two 20 mm Oerlikon autocannon were mounted on the ship's bridge wings. Both sets of torpedo tubes were retained, while the ship was fitted to launch a 10-depth charge pattern. Type 271 radar was mounted above the ship's bridge, replacing the low-angle director and associated rangefinder, while Type 291 radar was mounted at the top of the ship's mast. In 1943, a twin 6-pounder (57 mm) replaced the 4.7-inch gun at A-position, for use against German E-boats. (Note: Mackay appears to have been fitted with the twin six-pounder by October 1943, as the London Gazette refers to Mackay engaging E-boats with 6-pounders on the night of 24/25 October.)

== Service ==
=== 1919–1939 ===
Mackay joined the 3rd Destroyer Flotilla of the Atlantic Fleet in 1919, based at Rosyth. In September 1919, she deployed to the Baltic as part of the British campaign in the Baltic during the Russian Civil War, supporting the advance of Estonian forces against Petrograd (now Saint Petersburg), and taking part in a bombardment of the Bolshevik-held Krasnaya Gorka fort, together with the monitor Erebus, the cruisers Delhi and Dunedin, the leaders Shakespeare and Spenser and four destroyers on 27 October. Despite the support from the Royal Navy, the Estonian assault failed. Mackay returned to British waters at the end of November that year.

From April to June 1921, Mackay was deployed to Pembroke Dock as a response to industrial unrest in South Wales. The ship was refitted at Chatham Dockyard from July to August that year. In 1921, the destroyer forces of the Atlantic Fleet were reorganised into six smaller flotillas that were easier to manage than the earlier, larger flotillas, with Mackay serving as leader of the 4th Destroyer Flotilla by the end of 1921. Mackay was under repair at Chatham in January 1923 before recommissioning with the 4th Flotilla for deployment to the Dardanelles. She was damaged when leaving a fuelling jetty at Chatham on 7 February, this delaying her departure until 23 February. Mackay operated in the Dardanelles and eastern Mediterranean from March to August 1923, before returning to Chatham for another refit. In December 1923, Mackay transferred to the 9th Destroyer Flotilla, based at Rosyth with reduced crews, where she served until November 1925.

In June 1927, Mackay recommissioned as leader of the 5th Destroyer Flotilla, replacing Wallace which was having her turbines repaired. Mackay left the 5th Flotilla in November 1927 and entered refit at Sheerness Dockyard, which continued until April 1928, and then went into reserve. In June 1929, Mackay returned to active service, recommissioning at Devonport for service with the 1st Destroyer Flotilla in the Mediterranean. In 1933, it was proposed to transfer Mackay to the Royal Australian Navy to replace Anzac, but in the end, Stuart was transferred instead.

Mackay left the Mediterranean for British waters in March 1933, joining the 2nd Submarine Flotilla based at Devonport in April 1933. On 8 October 1933, the submarine L26 suffered a battery explosion in Campbeltown harbour, which killed two of the submarine's crew and seriously wounded fourteen men, with her hull holed. Mackay attended the damaged submarine from 8 to 11 October. Mackay remained with the 2nd Submarine Flotilla until September 1935, when the Abyssinia Crisis resulted in her joining the 1st Destroyer Flotilla based at Malta. She served with the 1st Flotilla until the end of March 1936, when she returned to British waters and went back into reserve at Devonport. On 25 July 1938, Mackay recommissioned, again joining the 2nd Submarine Flotilla. The Munich Crisis saw Mackay briefly (between 27 September and 10 October 1938) operate with the 12th Destroyer Flotilla before returning to the 2nd Submarine Flotilla. Mackay remained attached to the 2nd Submarine Flotilla in August 1939, on the eve of the outbreak of the Second World War.

=== Second World War ===
Following the outbreak of the Second World War, Mackay joined the 11th Destroyer Flotilla, part of the Western Approaches Command, initially based at Devonport and later operating out of Liverpool on anti-submarine patrol and convoy escort duties, as flotilla leader. On 15 September, the German submarine U-53 torpedoed the tanker Cheyenne, forcing Cheyenne's crew to abandon ship. (Note: Cheyenne's crew were picked up by the Norwegian merchant ship Ida Bakke.) Cheyenne remained afloat, and Mackay interrupted U-53's attempts to sink Cheyenne with gunfire, driving the submarine off, but Cheyenne could not be saved and was scuttled by Mackay. On 9 December 1939, Mackay was part of the escort for Convoy OB 48 when the tanker San Alberto was torpedoed by the German submarine U-48. San Alberto broke in two, and while the forward section sank quickly, the aft section remained afloat until deteriorating weather caused attempts to salvage it to be abandoned on 11 December, with Mackay scuttling the wreck and taking San Alberto's survivors back to Plymouth. On 17 January 1940, Mackay, part of the escort for Convoy OB 74, rescued the crew of the merchant ship Cairnross, sunk by a mine near Liverpool.

On 26 May 1940, Operation Dynamo, the evacuation of British and Allied troops from Dunkirk and nearby beaches began. Mackay was ordered to report for evacuation duties on 27 May, arriving at Dover early in the morning of 28 May. Mackay picked up 581 troops on 28 May, but when approaching the beaches for a second run just after midnight on the night of 28/29 May, ran aground off Zuydcoote. She was refloated, but the evacuation run was abandoned, with the resultant damage requiring repair at Sheerness from 3 to 5 June. After these repairs were completed, Mackay was deployed in the Western part of the English Channel, and took part in Operation Aerial, the evacuation of British troops from ports in the west of France. Mackay took part in the evacuations from Brest on 16–17 June, where she help to control the movement of evacuation shipping and ferried men from the shore to evacuation ships, from La Pallice on 20 June, and escorted ships carrying out the final evacuation from Saint-Jean-de-Luz, in the far South-West of France, on 24 June.

Mackay continued operations with the 11th Flotilla until October 1940, when she underwent a period of refit and repair at Devonport, with her boilers being replaced. On completion of this refit, in April 1941, Mackay joined the 16th Destroyer Flotilla based at Harwich, mainly operating in the North Sea, with duties including escorting convoys off the East coast of Britain. On 12 February 1942, Mackay, along with Whitshed, Walpole, Worcester of the 16th Flotilla and Campbell and Vivacious of the 21st Destroyer Flotilla, was exercising off Harwich, when the six ships were ordered to intercept the German battleships Scharnhorst and Gneisenau and the heavy cruiser Prinz Eugen, which were heading up the English Channel from France towards Germany in what became known as the Channel Dash. Walpole turned back due to mechanical problems before the remaining ships encountered the German force off the Scheldt estuary. The British ships came under heavy German fire as they attempted torpedo attacks, with Worcester being hit and badly damaged by German shells. All five British ships launched torpedoes at the German ships at a range of 4,000–2,400 yards (3,700–2,200 m), with Mackay launching her torpedoes from 4000 yards, but all the torpedoes missed.

On 29 August 1942, Mackay was temporarily detached to the Home Fleet in support of the Arctic convoy PQ 18 to Northern Russia and the return convoy QP 14. Mackay formed part of the distant cover force (led by the battleships Anson and Duke of York) for PQ 18 and QP 14, before returning to Harwich on 27 September 1942. On 21 December, Mackay was again detached to carry out screening operations with the Home Fleet, to cover for more modern destroyers that were deployed elsewhere. Mackay returned to Harwich on 26 December.

On the night of 7/8 March 1943, Mackay, together with the Motor Gun Boats MGB 20, MGB 17 and MGB 21, repelled an attack by German E-boats near the Sunk lightship in the Thames estuary. Two of the E-boats, S114 and S119 collided, with S119 then being sunk by MGB 20. On the night of 24/25 October 1943, 32 German E-boats attempted to attack Convoy FN 1160 off Cromer. The destroyer Pytchley acted as close escort for the convoy, with Mackay and the destroyers Campbell, Eglinton and Worcester, together with four MTBs, eight MGBs and four Motor Launches patrolled the convoy route. The British force managed to beat off the German attacks, with Mackay ramming and sinking one E-boat, S63 and a second (S88) sunk by MGB 603 and MGB 607 while the Naval trawler William Stephen, which had become detached from the convoy, was torpedoed and sunk by S74. On the night of 5/6 January 1944, Mackay was escorting Convoy WP 457, running between the Bristol Channel and Portsmouth, when it came under attack by seven German E-boats. Bad weather disrupted planned air cover for the convoy, and the E-boats managed to sink three merchant ships and the naval trawler Wallasea with no loss to themselves.

In June 1944, Mackay was deployed in support of the Normandy Landings, escorting convoys to the beaches from 7 June. She remained escorting invasion follow-up convoys until July, when she returned to the East coast. After the German surrender on 8 May, Mackay assisted in the Liberation of Norway, escorting, with Viceroy, nine minesweepers to Trondheim, arriving there on 17 May and visiting Bergen on 9 June.

=== Disposal ===
Mackay was allocated by BISCO to Metal Industries, Limited for disposal on 18 February 1947 and scrapped at their Charlestown breaking yard from June 1949.

== Pennant numbers ==
Pennant number	From	To
FA6	June 1919	
D70	1919	1940
I70	1940	1947
