= HMS Campbell (D60) =

Destroyer

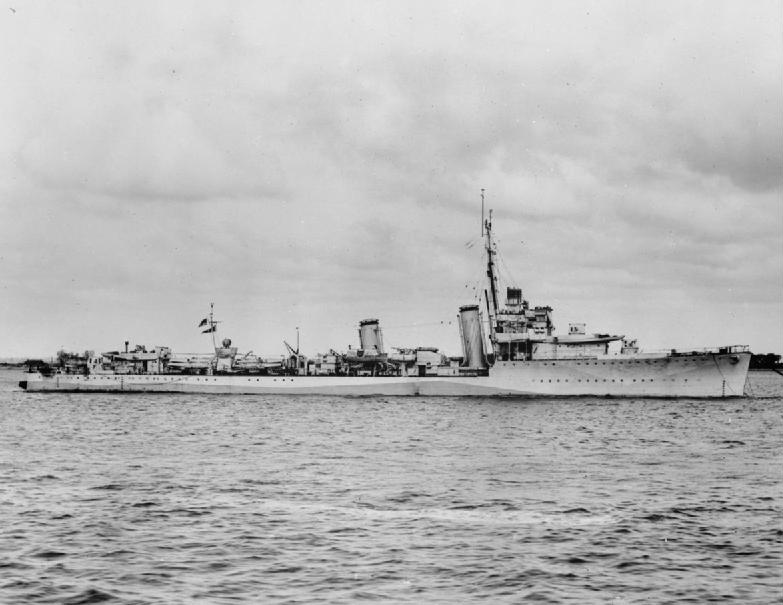

History

United Kingdom
- Name: HMS Campbell
- Ordered: April 1917
- Builder: Cammell Laird, Birkenhead
- Laid down: 10 November 1917
- Launched: 21 September 1918
- Commissioned: 21 December 1918
- Fate: Sold 18 February 1947

General characteristics
- Class & type: Admiralty type destroyer leader
- Displacement: 1,580 long tons (1,610 t) Normal; 2,050 long tons (2,080 t) deep load
- Length: 332 ft 6 in (101.35 m)
- Beam: 31 ft 9 in (9.68 m)
- Draught: 12 ft 6 in (3.81 m)
- Installed power: 40,000 shp (30,000 kW)
- Propulsion: 4 × Yarrow boilers; 2 × geared steam turbines; 2 × shafts
- Speed: 36.5 kn (42.0 mph; 67.6 km/h)
- Range: 5,000 nmi (5,800 mi; 9,300 km) at 15 kn (17 mph; 28 km/h)
- Complement: 183
- Armament: 5 × BL 4.7-inch (120 mm) Mk I guns; 1 × 3-inch (76 mm) 20 cwt anti-aircraft gun; 6 × 21-inch (533 mm) torpedo tubes

HMS Campbell was an Admiralty type flotilla leader (also known as the Scott-class) of the British Royal Navy. Built by Cammell Laird, Douglas commissioned in December 1918, just after the end of the First World War. During the Second World War, Campbell mainly served with as a convoy escort, particularly on the East Coast of the United Kingdom. She survived the war, and was sold for scrap in 1947.

== Design and construction ==
HMS Campbell was one of five Admiralty type flotilla leaders ordered from Cammell Laird (3) and Hawthorn Leslie (2) in April 1917. (Note: The other four ships were Mackay and Malcolm from Cammell Laird at Birkenhead, and Montrose and Stuart from Hawthorn Leslie at Hebburn on the Tyne. Three more ships of the class Scott, Bruce and Douglas, had been ordered earlier.) The ship was 320 feet 0 inches (97.54 m) long between perpendiculars and 332 feet 5 inches (101.32 m) overall, with a beam of 31 feet 9 inches (9.68 m) and a draught of 12 feet 6 inches (3.81 m). Design displacement was 1,580 long tons (1,610 t) normal and 2,050 long tons (2,080 t) full load. The ship's machinery consisted of four Yarrow boilers that fed steam at 250 pounds per square inch (1,700 kPa) to two sets of Parsons single-reduction geared-steam turbines, rated at 40,000 shaft horsepower (30,000 kW). This gave a design speed of 36.5 knots (67.6 km/h; 42.0 mph) light, which corresponded to about 32 knots (59 km/h; 37 mph) at full load. Up to 504 tons of oil fuel could be carried, giving a range of 5,000 nautical miles (9,300 km; 5,800 mi) at 15 knots (28 km/h; 17 mph).

Campbell's main gun armament consisted of five 4.7 in (120 mm)/45 calibre BL Mark I guns, (Note: In British practice, BL (Breech Loading) indicated that a separate, bagged charge was used.) on CP VI mountings capable of elevating to 30 degrees. These guns could fire a 50-pound (23 kg) shell to 15,800 yards (14,400 m) at a rate of 5–6 rounds per minute per gun. 120 rounds per gun were carried. Anti-aircraft armament consisted of a single 3 inch (76 mm) 20 cwt gun and two 2-pounder (40 mm) "pom-pom" autocannon. Torpedo armament consisted of six 21 inch (533 mm) torpedo tubes in two triple mounts. She had a complement of 183 officers and ratings.

Campbell was laid down on 10 November 1917, launched on 21 September 1918 and commissioned on 21 December 1918.

=== Modifications ===
While the Admiralty type flotilla leaders had only limited modifications between the wars, an early change during the Second World War was the replacement of the amidships 4.7-inch gun by two 2-pounder pom-poms, with the aft funnel shortened to improve the field of fire for the 3 inch anti-aircraft gun. In 1941, "X"-gun (the superimposed gun aft) was removed and replaced by the 3-inch anti-aircraft gun which was relocated from its original amidships position. Both sets of torpedo tubes were retained. (Note: Lenton suggests that "X"-gun was replaced by a 4-inch (102 mm) gun instead.) Two Oerlikon 20 mm cannon were mounted on the bridge wings, while further Oerlikon guns later replaced the 2-pounders. Radar (Type 286, later replaced by Type 290 and Type 271) was also fitted during the war.

== Service ==
=== Between the wars ===
On entering service, Campbell joined the 15th Destroyer Flotilla of the Grand Fleet as leader, and when the Grand Fleet was disbanded in April 1919, and the Atlantic Fleet established in its place, Campbell moved to the newly established 3rd Destroyer Flotilla, based first at Rosyth and later at Port Edgar, still as leader. In July that year, Campbell led part of the Third Flotilla when it was deployed to the Baltic Sea as part of the British campaign to support the newly established Baltic states against Bolshevik Russia during the Russian Civil War. In 1921, the destroyer flotillas were reorganised, reducing in size from 16 destroyers with two leaders to eight destroyers with a single leader. Campbell remained with the revised, smaller, Third Flotilla. In September 1922, as a result of the Chanak Crisis, there was a large scale redeployment of warships from British home waters to the eastern Mediterranean. Campbell left Devonport at the head of the Third Flotilla on 21 September, arriving at Çanakkale, (then known as Chanak), Turkey on 29 September. Campbell remained as leader of the Third Flotilla until 1923, when she transferred to the 6th Destroyer Flotilla. She was hit by a practice torpedo on 8 October 1924, with the resulting damage requiring 20 days docked at Rosyth to repair. Campbell remained as leader of the 6th Flotilla until February 1930 when she entered refit at Portsmouth, during which her boilers were retubed. On completion of the refit in June 1931, Campbell returned to the 6th Flotilla, serving with that Flotilla until May 1935.

Campbell, with a reserve crew, took part in the Fleet Review marking the Silver Jubilee of King George V. In September 1935, Campbell joined the newly established 21st Destroyer Flotilla of the Home Fleet, formed from the Reserve Fleet to replace ships sent to the Mediterranean as a result of the Abyssinia Crisis, and served as leader until the Flotilla was disbanded in December 1936. On 21 March 1937, with the Spanish Civil War ongoing, Campbell and the destroyer Blanche evacuated 450 child refugees from Bilbao to Île d'Oléron, France. By August 1938, Campbell was back in reserve on the Nore, awaiting a refit, which did not start until April 1939.

=== Second World War ===
Following the outbreak of the Second World War, Campbell underwent a refit which continued until February 1940, when she took part in convoy escort operations in the North Sea and the Western Approaches. In April 1940, Campbell was diverted to Scapa Flow as a result of the German invasion of Norway, landing troops at Molde on 23 April. Campbell took part in evacuation operations from Harstad and Andfjorden between 3 and 12 June 1940, before returning to convoy escort duties, supplementing them by anti-invasion patrols.

On 20 June 1940, the German submarine U-122 torpedoed and sank the cargo ship SS Empire Conveyor. Campbell rescued the 38 survivors from Empire Conveyor, landing then at Liverpool on 21 June. On the night of 19/20 November, Campbell and the Hunt-class destroyer Garth were on patrol east of Lowestoft when they encountered three Schnellboot (S-boats or German motor torpedo boats), S38, S54 and S57. S38 was sunk by ramming.

On the night of 19/20 November 1941, Campbell, along with Garth and the destroyer Vesper formed a support group for Convoy FS650, consisting of 59 merchant ships, which also had a close escort of two destroyers and two corvettes, when the convoy was attacked by four S-boats off Great Yarmouth. Three merchant ships, Aruba, Waldinge and War Mehtar were sunk, with one S-boat sunk. When responding the attack, Campbell mistook Garth for a German ship and fired on her, hitting Garth with six pom-pom shells. These shells seriously damaged Garth, causing loss of all steam and electrical power and immobilising the ship (which had to be towed back to port), and killed two men.

Campbell was one of six destroyers that were ordered to reinforce Dover Command on 3 February 1942, in anticipation that the German battleships Scharnhorst and Gneisenau and heavy cruiser Prinz Eugen would attempt to return from Brest in German-occupied France to Germany. On the night of 11/12 February, the German ships left Brest to pass through the British blockade, in what became known as the Channel Dash, but were undetected by the British owing to a combination of German jamming and British technical failures. The six destroyers (Campbell, Vivacious, Worcester, Mackay, Whitshed and Walpole, under the command of Captain C. T. M. Pizey aboard Campbell) were exercising off Harwich when the Germans were finally detected, and were ordered to intercept the German fleet off the mouth of the River Scheldt, steering a course through a German minefield to allow the interception to take place. One destroyer, Walpole was forced to turn back due to mechanical trouble, but the remaining five destroyers reached the German force at 15:42 hr. They launched torpedoes at a range of 2,400–4,000 yards (2,200–3,700 m), but none hit, while Worcester was heavily damaged by German shells. On 12 March 1942, Campbell collided with the destroyer Vesper, and was under repair at the Southampton shipyard of Thornycroft until 25 April that year. From 2 to 7 September 1942, Campbell formed part of the escort of the Arctic convoy PQ 18 on its initial leg from Loch Ewe to Iceland.

Campbell continued on East coast escort duty through the rest of 1942 and into 1943. She was refitted at London from February to April 1943. On the night of 24/25 October 1943, Campbell was part of the escort (consisting of 5 destroyers, 6 Motor Gun Boats and two Motor Launches) of Convoy FN1160 when it came under attack by 32 S-boats. The escort managed to drive off the attacks with only the trawler William Stephen being sunk, while the S-boat S63 was sunk by the destroyer Mackay and S88 was sunk by Motor Gun Boats.

In June 1944, Campbell took part in Operation Neptune, the naval operations supporting the Allied Invasion of Normandy. On 4 June, the landings, planned for 5 June, were postponed for a day due to poor weather forecasts. Campbell was at sea when the postponement signal was sent out, and observed a group of minesweepers (the 14th Minesweeper Flotilla) in the process of sweeping mines. In the belief that the minesweepers had not received the postponement signal (in fact it had been received, but the commander of the minesweepers had decided to continue clearing the mines from the swept channel before returning to port) Campbell and the sloop Hind closed with the minesweepers to signal them by semaphore (strict radio silence had been imposed). Campbell soon found herself in the middle of a field of floating mines and had to be extricated by the minesweepers. Campbell continued convoy escort operations in the Channel in support of the landings until July, when she returned to East coast convoy operations.

Campbell continued on escort operations along the east coast and English Channel until the end of the war in Europe. On 13 May 1945, Campbell formed part of the escort for the cruiser Devonshire and the fast minelayers Apollo and Ariadne as they carried the Norwegian Government-in-Exile and Crown Prince Olav home from exile to Oslo.

=== Disposal ===
Campbell went into reserve after the end of the Second World War, and was transferred on 18 February 1947 to BISCO for scrapping and was broken up by Metal Industries of Rosyth from 30 March 1948.

== Pennant numbers ==
| Pennant number | From | To |
|---|---|---|
| G76 | December 1918 | October 1919 |
| D60 | November 1919 | 1940 |
| I60 | 1940 | 1947 |
