= HMS Whitshed =

Destroyer of the Royal Navy

History

United Kingdom
- Name: HMS Whitshed
- Ordered: April 1918
- Laid down: June 1918
- Launched: 31 January 1919
- Commissioned: 11 July 1919
- Refit: Rebuilt as a short range escort (SRE) 1940
- Stricken: Sold to BISCO for scrapping February 1947
- Motto: Libertas et natale; Freedom and Fatherland only
- Honours and awards: Atlantic 1940; Dunkirk 1940; North Sea 1941–45; Dover Straits 1941; English Channel 1942–45; Normandy 1944
- Fate: Scrapped April 1948
- Badge: On a Field Red, a Demi-Lion rampant Gold, holding a trefoil Green.

General characteristics
- Class & type: Admiralty modified W-class destroyer
- Displacement: 1,140 tons standard, 1,550 tons full
- Length: 300 ft o/a, 312 ft p/p
- Beam: 29.5 feet (9.0 m)
- Draught: 9 feet (2.7 m), 11.25 feet (3.43 m) under full load
- Propulsion: Yarrow type Water-tube boilers, Brown-Curtis geared steam turbines, 2 shafts, 27,000 shp
- Speed: 34 kt
- Range: 320–370 tons oil; 3,500 nmi at 15 kt; 900 nmi at 32 kt
- Complement: 127
- Sensors & processing systems: Type 286M Air Warning Radar fitted 1940; Type 271 Surface Warning Radar fitted 1940
- Armament: As built 1920: 4 × BL 4.7 in (120-mm) Mk.I guns, mount P Mk.I; 2 × QF 2 pdr Mk.II "pom-pom" (40 mm L/39); 6 × 21-inch Torpedo Tubes; 1940 SRE conversion: 3 × BL 4.7 in (120mm) Mk.I L/45 guns; 1 × 3 in (76 mm) AA gun; 2 × QF 2 pdr Mk.II "pom-pom" (40 mm L/39); 3 × 21-inch Torpedo Tubes (one triple mount); 2 × depth charge racks; twin QF 6 pounder 10 cwt gun (1942 – replaced ‘A’ gun)

Service record
- Operations: Nanking Incident 1927; World War II
- Victories: U-55

HMS Whitshed (D77/I77) was an Admiralty modified W-class destroyer of the Royal Navy. She was ordered from Swan Hunter & Wigham Richardson Ltd under the 14th Order for Destroyers in the Emergency War Program of 1918–19. She was the first ship to carry the name.

== Construction ==
HMS Whitshed's keel was laid on 3 June 1918 at the Swan Hunter & Wigham Richardson Ltd. at Wallsend on Tyne. She was launched on 31 January 1919. She was 312 feet (95 m) overall in length with a beam of 29.5 feet (9.0 m). Her mean draught was 9 feet (2.7 m), and would reach 11.25 feet (3.43 m) under full load. She had a displacement of 1,140 tons standard and up to 1,550 full load.

She was propelled by three Yarrow water tube boilers powering Brown-Curtis geared steam turbines developing 27,000 SHP driving two screws for a maximum designed speed of 34 knots. She was oil-fired and had a bunkerage of 320 to 370 tons. This gave a range of between 3500 nautical miles at 15 knots and 900 nautical miles at 32 knots.

She shipped four BL 4.7 in (120-mm) Mk.I guns, mount P Mk.I naval guns in four single centre-line turrets. The turrets were disposed as two forward and two aft in super imposed firing positions. She also carried two QF 2 pdr Mk.II "pom-pom" (40 mm L/39) mounted abeam between funnels. Abaft of the second funnel, she carried six 21-inch Torpedo Tubes in triple mounts on the centre-line.

== Inter-War period ==
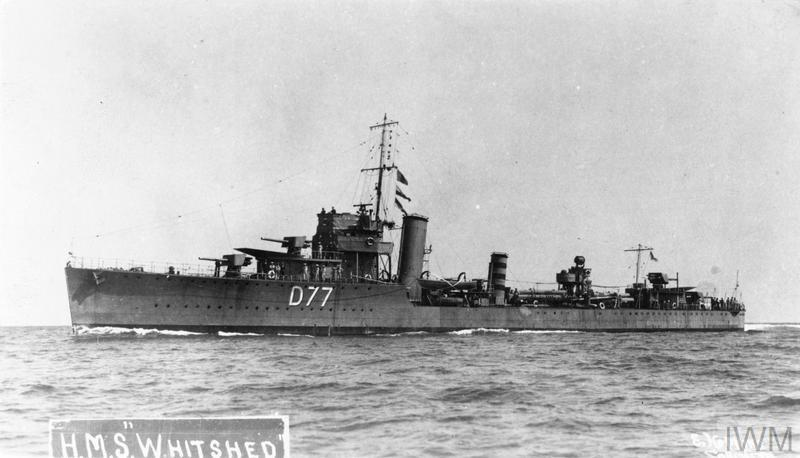
Whitshed in 1919

HMS Whitshed was commissioned on 11 July 1919 into the Royal Navy with pennant number FA7. She was assigned to the 3rd Destroyer Flotilla in the Atlantic Fleet. In October 1919 she was assigned the pennant number D77 under a simplification of the pennant number system. The Flotilla served in Home waters in the early 1920s. The Flotilla was first assigned to the Mediterranean and in 1926 to the China Station. She was involved in the Nanking Incident in March 1927. When the United States Navy gunboat USS Fulton was heavily damaged by fire while at sea off China on 14 March 1934, Whitshed, her sister ship HMS Wishart, and the merchant ship SS Tsinan came to Fulton's assistance. Wishart and Tsinan took off Fulton's crew, three of whom had suffered minor injuries, and took them to the Royal Navy Dockyard at Hong Kong while Whitshed stood by Fulton until a salvage party could put the fire out. The United States Department of the Navy later passed thanks to British naval authorities for the assistance Wishart and Whitshed provided to Fulton and her crew.

Later in the 1930s, Whitshed was placed in reserve as more modern destroyers came on line.

== World War Two ==
In 1939, HMS Whitshed was reactivated and assigned to the 18th Destroyer Flotilla at Portland for convoy defence in the English Channel and South-West Approaches. On 30 January 1940, in conjunction with the sloop Fowey and an RAF Sunderland flying boat from No. 228 Squadron, Whitshed sank U-55 in the South-West Approaches whilst escorting convoy OA30G.

In April, she was transferred to the 19th Destroyer Flotilla at Dover to assist with support of operations off the Belgian and Dutch coasts. She took part in the demolition and evacuation of IJmuiden and Amsterdam (Operation XD(A)) in early May 1940. She then carried supplies to Dunkirk and embarked the Irish Guards before assisting in the evacuation of the Hook of Holland (Operation Ordnance) and Ostend in mid-May.

On 22 May, Whitshed escorted ships carrying troops of the 20th Guards Brigade to Boulogne in order to hold the town while evacuation operations took place, with Whitshed carrying anti-tank guns. On her return journey she carried RAF personnel, Prisoners of War and civilians back to England. She returned to Boulogne on 23 May as evacuation operations continued, picking up wounded troops and shelling German forces before being damaged by German bombers, with one killed and 13 wounded. Later that evening, when some air cover was available, Whitshed along with sister ship Vimiera, reentered Boulogne, with each ship embarking over 550 men, directly engaging and destroying several German tanks attacking the harbour in the process. On the 26th she deployed for the evacuation of Allied troops from Dunkirk (Operation Dynamo). At this time her pennant number was changed to I77 for visual signalling purposes. Upon release from Op Dynamo she returned to Harwich and convoy defence, and anti-invasion patrols in the North Sea and English Channel. She was one of the few ships not damaged at Dunkirk.

On 31 July she sustained serious structural damage after detonating a mine off Harwich. Wild Swan towed her back to Harwich. She was under repair until December.

The year 1941 was one of continuing convoy escort and patrolling of the North Sea and English Channel. In February she escorted Motor Torpedo Boats for mine laying in the North Sea. The operation came under air attack with no casualties or damage.

In February 1942, Whitshed joined the destroyers Mackay and Walpole of the 21st Flotilla and Campbell, Worcester and Vivacious of the 16th Flotilla. On the 12th, she carried out a torpedo attack on the German battleships Scharnhorst and Gneisenau and heavy cruiser Prinz Eugen, which had broken out of Brest and proceeded via the Dover Straits to Wilhelmshaven in the Channel Dash.

For the remainder of 1942 and most of 1943, Whitshed undertook convoy escort duties and patrolled the North Sea and English Channel. In 1942, her ‘A’ gun was replaced with a twin 6-pounder army gun for engaging E-Boats. In November 1943 she was in action with E-Boats while escorting convoy CW221 off Hastings with two motor gun boats and four motor launches of the Coastal Forces. On 18 April 1944 she was in action again with E-Boats on a mine laying operation in the English Channel.

In June 1944 she joined Escort Group 104 with Montrose, Borage and Loosestrife and escorted convoy EIL1 comprising 12 Landing Ship Tank (LST) and 24 Landing Craft Tank (LCT) from Southend to the assembly area of the Eastern Task Force. Then she returned to Southend to escort the build-up convoys.

In July she was released from Operation Neptune and resumed mercantile convoy escort and interception patrols engaging E-Boats and submersibles employed in mine laying operations in the North Sea and English Channel through April 1945. After VE-Day she was deployed in re-occupation operations. In June 1945 she was reduced to reserve status.

== Disposition ==
HMS Whitshed was not deployed again operationally and after the end of hostilities she was paid off and reduced to reserve status. The ship was placed on the Disposal List in 1946. She was sold to BISCO in February 1947 for demolition by TJ King. The ship arrived at the breakers yard at Gateshead in April 1948.

== Bibliography ==
- Blair, Clay (1996). Hitler's U-Boat War: The Hunters 1939–1942. New York: Random House. ISBN 0-394-58839-8.
- Campbell, John (1985). Naval Weapons of World War II. Annapolis, Maryland: Naval Institute Press. ISBN 0-87021-459-4.
- Chesneau, Roger, ed. (1980). Conway's All the World's Fighting Ships 1922–1946. Greenwich, UK: Conway Maritime Press. ISBN 0-85177-146-7.
- Colledge, J. J.; Warlow, Ben (2006) [1969]. Ships of the Royal Navy: The Complete Record of All Fighting Ships of the Royal Navy from the 15th Century to the Present (3rd Rev ed.). London: Chatham Publishing. ISBN 978-1-86176-281-8. OCLC 67375475.
- Cocker, Maurice (24 May 1981). Destroyers of the Royal Navy, 1893–1981. Ian Allan. ISBN 0-7110-1075-7.
- Friedman, Norman (2009). British Destroyers From Earliest Days to the Second World War. Annapolis, Maryland: Naval Institute Press. ISBN 978-1-59114-081-8.
- Gardiner, Robert & Gray, Randal, eds. (1985). Conway's All the World's Fighting Ships 1906–1921. Annapolis, Maryland: Naval Institute Press. ISBN 0-85177-245-5.
- Haarr, Geirr H. (2013). The Gathering Storm: The Naval War in Northern Europe: September 1939–April 1940. Barnsley, UK: Seaforth Publishing. ISBN 978-1-84832-140-3.
- Lenton, H. T. (1998). British & Empire Warships of the Second World War. Annapolis, Maryland: Naval Institute Press. ISBN 1-55750-048-7.
- March, Edgar J. (1966). British Destroyers: A History of Development, 1892–1953; Drawn by Admiralty Permission From Official Records & Returns, Ships' Covers & Building Plans. London: Seeley Service. OCLC 164893555.
- Preston, Antony (1971). 'V & W' Class Destroyers 1917–1945. London: Macdonald. OCLC 464542895.
- Raven, Alan & Roberts, John (1979). 'V' and 'W' Class Destroyers. Man o'War. Vol. 2. London: Arms & Armour. ISBN 0-85368-233-X.
- Rohwer, Jürgen (2005). Chronology of the War at Sea 1939–1945: The Naval History of World War Two (Third Revised ed.). Annapolis, Maryland: Naval Institute Press. ISBN 1-59114-119-2.
- Sebag-Montefiore, Hugh (2015). Dunkirk: Fight to the Last Man (75th Anniversary ed.). London: Penguin. ISBN 978-0-241-97226-7.
- Stitt, George (1943). HMS Wideawake: Destroyer and Preserver (Whitshed and all names disguised as wartime publication). London: George Allen and Unwin.
- Whinney, Bob (2000). The U-boat Peril: A Fight for Survival. Cassell. ISBN 0-304-35132-6.
- Whitley, M.J. (2000). Destroyers of World War Two: An International Encyclopedia. London: Cassell & Co. ISBN 1-85409-521-8.
- Winser, John de S. (1999). B.E.F. Ships Before, At and After Dunkirk. Gravesend, Kent: World Ship Society. ISBN 0-905617-91-6.
