= QF 6-pounder 10 cwt gun =

QF 6-pounder 10 cwt Mark I
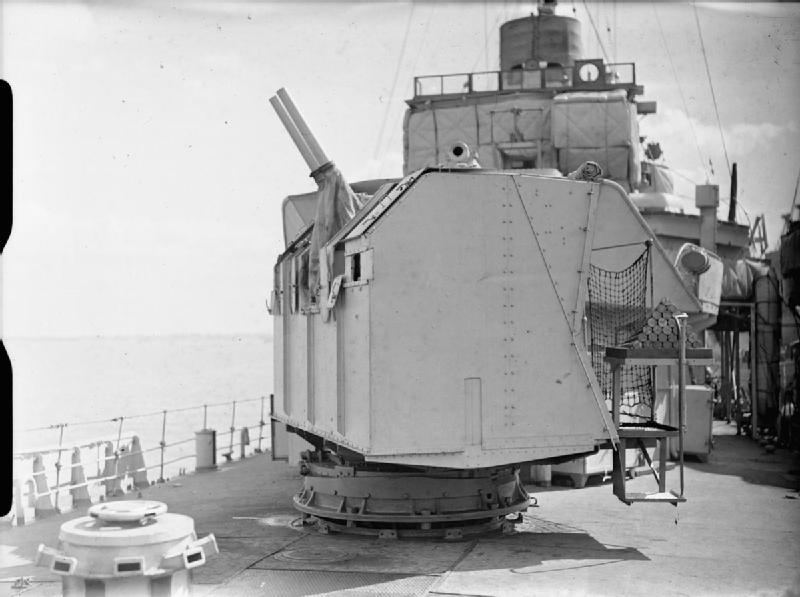
- The 6-pounder gun mark I in twin mark I mounting on board HMS Mackay whilst she is at Harwich.
- Type: Naval gun and coastal gun
- Place of origin: United Kingdom

Service history
- In service: 1930s–1950s
- Used by: British Commonwealth
- Wars: Second World War

Production history
- Variants: Naval gun (twin mount); Coastal gun (twin mount)

Specifications
- Mass: 1,060 lb (480 kg)
- Length: 9 ft (2.7 m)
- Crew: 6
- Shell: 57 × 464 mm R
- Calibre: 57 mm (2.24 in)
- Breech: semi-automatic sliding breech block
- Recoil: 1 ft (30 cm)
- Elevation: -10/+80
- Traverse: 360 degrees
- Rate of fire: 72 rounds per minute
- Muzzle velocity: 2,390 ft/s (727 m/s) HE round
- Effective firing range: 11,300 yards (10,330 m) at 45° HE round

The British QF (quick-firing) 6-pounder 10 cwt gun (Note: "6 pounder" refers to the approximate weight of projectiles, which was a traditional British way of denoting small guns. "10 cwt" referred to the approximate weight of the gun and breech in hundredweight (cwt) rounded up : 10 cwt = 10 × 112 pounds = 1,120 pounds (510 kilograms). It was standard British practice to differentiate guns of the same calibre by adding weight in cwt to the description.) was a 57 mm twin-mount light coast defence and naval gun from the 1930s to 1950s.

== Development ==
Following the emergence of small fast attack craft during the First World War, it was decided that the British Royal Navy Dockyards were vulnerable to attack by motor torpedo boats which had the speed to evade the heavy coast defence guns which defended them. In 1925, a design was adopted for a twin-barrelled weapon capable of sustained semi-automatic fire. The barrels of the weapon could be fired singly or together. The pedestal mounting and the gun crew were enclosed to the front, sides and top in a reinforced-steel barbette.

The first trials took place in 1928 with production beginning at the Woolwich Ordnance Factory in 1933. Formal War Office acceptance occurred on 28 February 1934. A coastal-defence trial using the gun and barbette was conducted at Culver Battery on the Isle of Wight in 1936. As the shadow of Second World War approached, food equipment and machinery manufacturer, Baker Perkins, was asked to take over production in March 1939; the first guns left its Westwood, Peterborough factory in March 1941. The Mark II version of the QF 6-pounder had a monobloc barrel (made from a single forging) instead of a lined barrel in the Mark Is.

== Coast defence ==
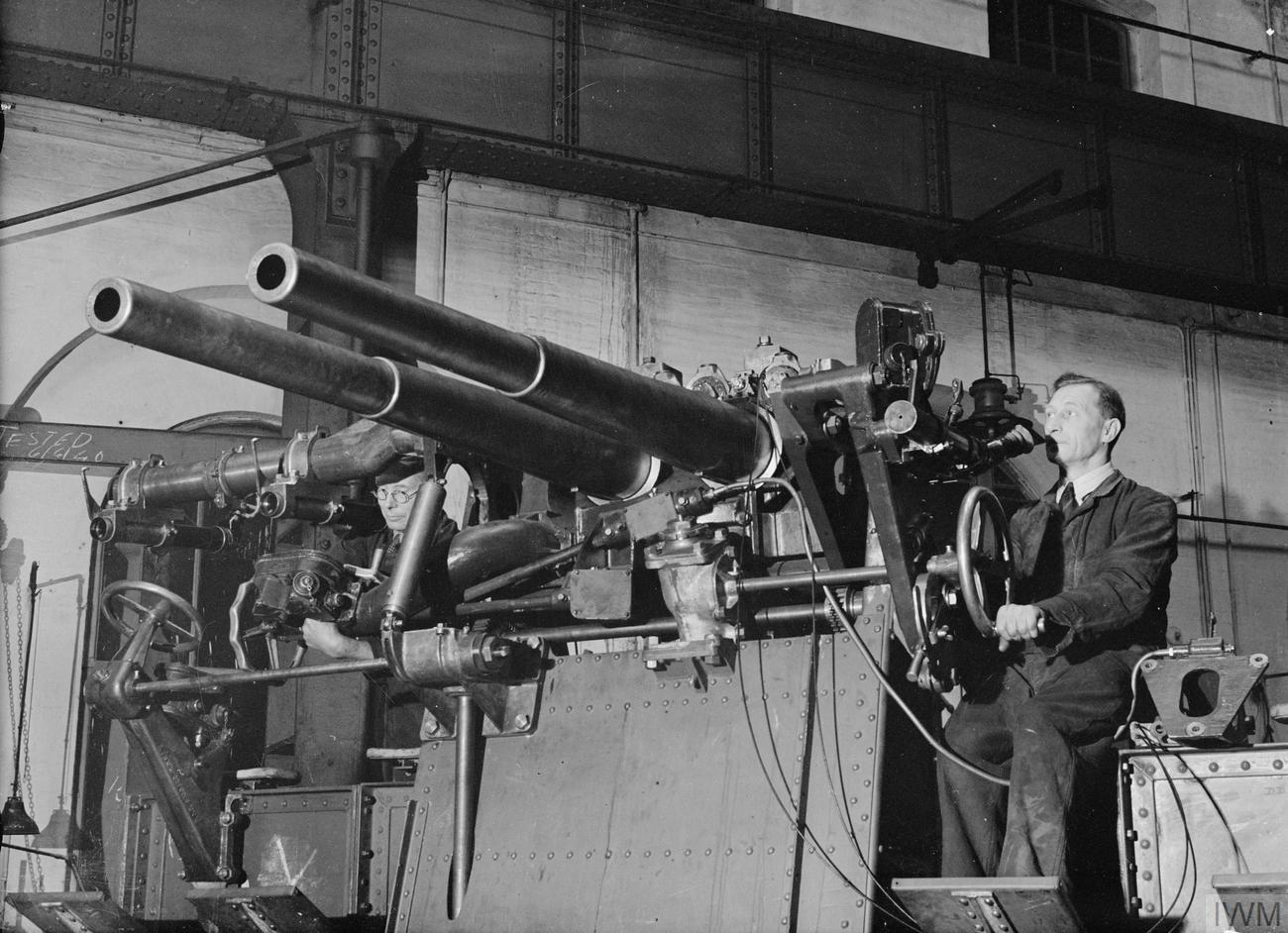
The 6-pounder gun mark I in twin coastal artillery mount.

The first twin 6-pounders were installed at Singapore in 1937. The first UK installation was at Eastern Arm Battery in Dover, just before the outbreak of World War II. Also in 1939, nine pairs of guns were installed in Fort St. Elmo and Fort Ricasoli in the Grand Harbour at Valletta, Malta. These were to play a vital role in the defence against an attack by nineteen Italian MAS fast attack boats on 26 July 1941, when five MAS boats were sunk in less than two minutes. By the end of 1942, 155 of these weapons had been produced for 31 places around the world. The pair installed in 1944 at Fort Rodd Hill at Esquimalt Harbour, British Columbia, may be the last in existence.

== Naval gun ==
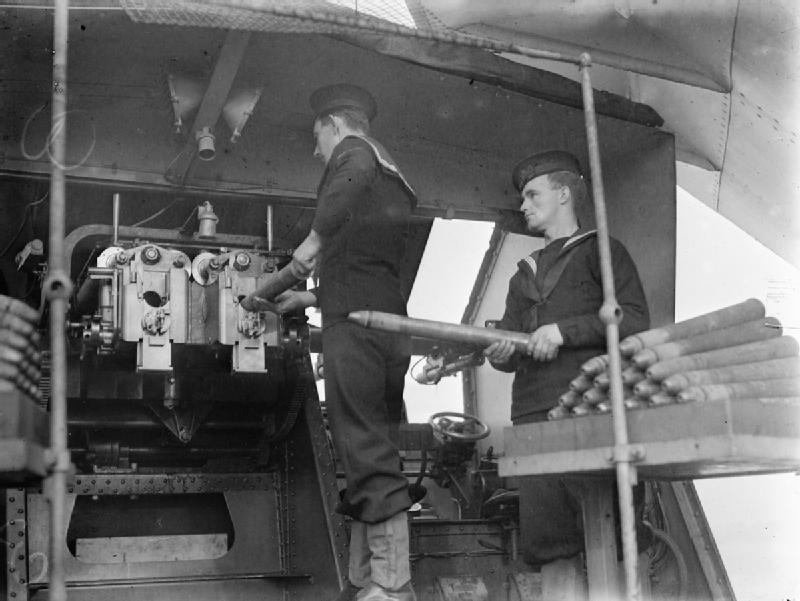
Loading the 6-pounder 10 cwt aboard HMS Mackay

One of the problems that persisted throughout the war was surface night attacks by fast E-boats. These would lie in wait for convoys and then, at the appropriate moment, sweep across their front, firing torpedoes and making a speedy escape into the darkness. The 4.7-inch and 4-inch guns of destroyers could neither track nor fire fast enough to deal with this form of attack and the 20 mm Oerlikon cannon did not fire a shell heavy enough to cripple the vessel. A remedy was offered in the form of the twin 6-pounder 10 cwt gun.

For naval use, it was mounted in place of No 1 gun (A mount) on four Admiralty modified W class destroyers and proved an effective countermeasure. Since the need for greater anti-submarine capability was vital, even on the coastal convoys and the 6-pounder competed for space with the new ahead-throwing Hedgehog anti-submarine mortar, only four standard destroyers, HMS Walpole, Windsor, Whitshed and Wivern, were fitted with this twin-6-pounder mounting instead of a BL 4.7-inch single mounting.

Along with these four, three of the Admiralty type flotilla leaders, HMS Campbell, Mackay and Montrose, were refitted with the mount.

== Notes and references ==
Notes

Citations

- DiGiulian, Tony (3 May 2019). "6-pdr / 10cwt [2.244"/47 (57 mm)] QF Mark I". Navweaps.
