= Admiralty type flotilla leader =

Class of British flotilla leaders

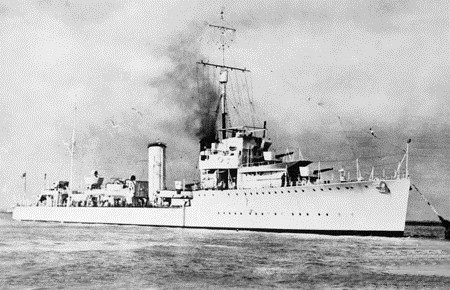
- HMAS Stuart

Class overview
- Operators: Royal Australian Navy; Royal Navy
- Preceded by: Thornycroft type leader
- Succeeded by: A- and B class leaders
- Planned: 10
- Completed: 8
- Cancelled: 2
- Lost: 1

General characteristics
- Type: Flotilla leader
- Displacement: 1,580 tons standard; 2,053 tons full load
- Length: 322 ft 6 in (98.30 m) o/a
- Beam: 31 ft 9 in (9.68 m)
- Draught: 12 ft 6 in (3.81 m)
- Propulsion: 4 Yarrow-type boilers, Parsons single reduction turbines, 2 shafts, 40,000 shp (30,000 kW)
- Speed: 36.5 knots (67.6 km/h)
- Range: 5,000 nmi (9,260 km) at 15 knots (28 km/h)
- Complement: 164
- Armament: 5 × BL 4.7-inch (120 mm) Mark I guns; (3 replaced by twin QF 6-pounder (57 mm) 10 cwt mountings in WWII); 1 × QF 3-inch (76 mm) 20 cwt anti-aircraft gun; 2 × triple tubes for 21-inch (533 mm) torpedoes

The Admiralty type leader, sometimes known as the Scott class, were a class of eight destroyer leaders designed and built for the Royal Navy towards the end of World War I. They were named after Scottish historical leaders. The function of a leader was to carry the flag staff of a destroyer flotilla, therefore they were enlarged to carry additional crew, offices and signalling equipment, allowing a fifth gun to be carried. These ships were contemporary with the Thornycroft type leader, distinguishable by their two narrow funnels of equal height, the Thornycroft designs latter having characteristic broad, slab-sided funnels.

All except Mackay and Malcolm were completed in time for wartime service, Scott being a war loss. The two final orders – Barrington and Hughes – were cancelled with the end of the War; these two had originally been ordered to the Thornycroft leader design. Stuart was transferred to Australia in 1933. All the remaining ships except Bruce (expended as a target ship in 1939) survived service in World War II, being converted to escort ships. Montrose and Stuart had Brown-Curtis steam turbines, giving 43,000 shp (32,000 kW) for an extra ½ knot.

== Ships in class ==
The prototype was ordered in April 1916 under the War Emergency Programme:

- Scott; built by Cammell Laird & Company, Birkenhead, launched 18 October 1917 and completed 1918. Torpedoed by U-boat 15 August 1918 in the North Sea off the Dutch coast.

Two more were ordered in December 1916:

- Bruce; built by Cammell Laird, laid down 12 May 1917, launched 26 February 1918 and completed 30 May 1918. Sunk as target off the Isle of Wight, 22 November 1939
- Douglas; built by Cammell Laird, laid down 30 June 1917, launched 8 June 1918 and completed 2 September 1918. Convoy escort during World War II, sold for breaking up 20 March 1945.

Five more were ordered in April 1917. The second vessel was originally named Claverhouse, but was renamed Mackay 31 December 1918:

- Campbell; built by Cammell Laird, laid down 10 November 1917, launched 21 September 1918 and completed 21 December 1918. Convoy escort during World War II, sold for breaking up 18 February 1947.
- Mackay; built by Cammell Laird, launched 21 December 1918 and completed 1919. Allocated to 11th Destroyer Flotilla in September 1939. Convoy escort during World War II, sold for breaking up 18 February 1947.
- Malcolm; built by Cammell Laird, laid down 5 March 1918, launched 29 May 1919 and completed 1919. Convoy escort during World War II, sold for breaking up 25 July 1945.
- Montrose; built by R. & W. Hawthorn Leslie and Company, Hebburn on Tyne, laid down 4 October 1917, launched 10 June 1918 and completed 14 September 1918. Convoy escort during World War II, sold for breaking up 31 January 1946.
- Stuart; built by Hawthorn Leslie, laid down 18 October 1917, launched 22 August 1918 and completed 21 December 1918. Transferred to the Royal Australian Navy 11 October 1933, sold for breaking up 3 February 1947.

Another two were ordered in April 1918, but were cancelled with the end of the war:

- Barrington, ordered from Cammell Laird, cancelled December 1918.
- Hughes, ordered from Cammell Laird, cancelled December 1918.

== Bibliography ==
- Campbell, John (1985). Naval Weapons of World War II. Annapolis, Maryland: Naval Institute Press. ISBN 0-87021-459-4.
- Chesneau, Roger, ed. (1980). Conway's All the World's Fighting Ships 1922–1946. Greenwich, UK: Conway Maritime Press. ISBN 0-85177-146-7.
- Colledge, J. J.; Warlow, Ben (2006) [1969]. Ships of the Royal Navy: The Complete Record of All Fighting Ships of the Royal Navy from the 15th Century to the Present (3rd Rev ed.). London: Chatham Publishing. ISBN 978-1-86176-281-8. OCLC 67375475.
- Cocker, Maurice (17 February 1981). Destroyers of the Royal Navy, 1893–1981. Ian Allan. ISBN 0-7110-1075-7.
- Friedman, Norman (2009). British Destroyers From Earliest Days to the Second World War. Annapolis, Maryland: Naval Institute Press. ISBN 978-1-59114-081-8.
- Gardiner, Robert & Gray, Randal, eds. (1985). Conway's All the World's Fighting Ships 1906–1921. Annapolis, Maryland: Naval Institute Press. ISBN 0-85177-245-5.
- Lenton, H. T. (1998). British & Empire Warships of the Second World War. Annapolis, Maryland: Naval Institute Press. ISBN 1-55750-048-7.
- March, Edgar J. (1966). British Destroyers: A History of Development, 1892–1953; Drawn by Admiralty Permission From Official Records & Returns, Ships' Covers & Building Plans. London: Seeley Service. OCLC 164893555.
- Rohwer, Jürgen (2005). Chronology of the War at Sea 1939–1945: The Naval History of World War Two (Third Revised ed.). Annapolis, Maryland: Naval Institute Press. ISBN 1-59114-119-2.
- Whinney, Bob (2000). The U-boat Peril: A Fight for Survival. Cassell. ISBN 0-304-35132-6.
- Whitley, M. J. (1988). Destroyers of World War 2. Annapolis, Maryland: Naval Institute Press. ISBN 0-87021-326-1.
- Winser, John de D. (1999). B.E.F. Ships Before, At and After Dunkirk. Gravesend, Kent: World Ship Society. ISBN 0-905617-91-6.
