= HMS Wren (D88) =

Destroyer of the Royal Navy

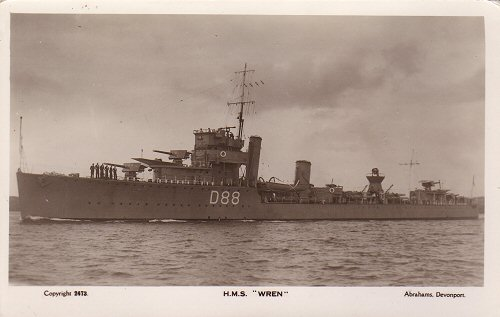
- HMS Wren

History

United Kingdom
- Name: HMS Wren
- Ordered: April 1918
- Builder: Yarrow Shipbuilders Limited
- Laid down: June 1918
- Launched: 11 November 1919
- Commissioned: 23 January 1923
- Identification: Pennant numbers D88 and I88
- Motto: Ex parvalis magna; "From Small Things (come) Great"
- Honours and awards: Atlantic 1939-400; Norway 1940
- Fate: Sunk 27 July 1940 by air attack
- Badge: On a Field Blue, a Wren on a branch, all Gold.

General characteristics
- Class & type: Admiralty modified W class destroyer
- Displacement: 1,140 tons standard, 1,550 tons full
- Length: 312 ft o/a, 300 ft p/p
- Beam: 29.5 feet (9.0 m)
- Draught: 9 feet (2.7 m), 11.25 feet (3.43 m) under full load
- Propulsion: 3 × Yarrow type Water-tube boilers; Brown-Curtis geared steam turbines driving 2 shafts producing 27,000 shp
- Speed: 34 kn
- Range: 320-370 tons oil; 3,500 nmi at 15 kn; 900 nmi at 32 kn
- Complement: 127
- Armament: 4 × BL 4.7 in (120-mm) Mk.I guns, mount P Mk.I; 2 × QF 2 pdr Mk.II "pom-pom" (40 mm L/39); 6 × 21-inch Torpedo Tubes

General characteristics War Modifications
- Complement: 134
- Armament: 3 × BL 4.7 in (120mm) Mk.I L/45 guns; 1 × QF 12 pounder 12 cwt naval gun; 2 × QF 2 pdr Mk.II "pom-pom" (40 mm L/39); 3 × 21-inch Torpedo Tubes (one triple mount); 2 × depth charge racks

Service record
- Part of: 4th Destroyer Flotilla – 1923; 16th Destroyer Flotilla – Sep 1939
- Operations: World War II 1939 to 1945
- Victories: None

HMS Wren (D88/I88) was an Admiralty modified W class destroyer built for the Royal Navy. She was ordered in April 1918 from Yarrow Shipbuilders Limited under the 13th Order for Destroyers of the Emergency War Program of 1918–19. She was the third Royal Navy ship to carry the name, which was introduced in 1653.

== Construction ==
HMS Wren's keel was laid in June 1918 at the Yarrow Shipbuilders Limited, Scotstoun. The signing of the armistice with Germany led to the cancellation of 35 destroyers out of Wren's class of 56, but she survived this and the cancellation of a further seven vessels in September 1919. Wren was launched on 11 November 1919, after which she was towed to the dockyard at Pembroke Dock for completion.

== Inter War Years ==
After a delay, she was commissioned into the Royal Navy on 23 January 1923 with pennant number D88. After commissioning, she was assigned to the 4th Destroyer Flotilla of the Atlantic Fleet. She served mainly in home waters and in 1938 was assigned as a rescue ship for the Home Fleet carriers.

== Second World War ==
In September 1939 Wren was transferred to the 16th Destroyer Flotilla at Portsmouth for convoy defence and anti-submarine patrols in the English Channel and Southwest Approaches. In November she was transferred to Nore Command for convoy defence in the North Sea. Wren was reassigned to the 18th Destroyer Flotilla, Western Approaches Command in January 1940 and undertook convoy defence once more in the Southwest Approaches. Following the German invasion of Norway in April 1940, she transferred to Scapa Floe to carry out convoy escort duties to Norway. She provided gunfire support to the British landings at Bjerkvik but returned to convoy duties and did not take part in the evacuation of the British expeditionary force. At the end of May her pennant number was changed to I88 for visual signalling purposes. On 25 June she returned to the 16th Destroyer Flotilla based at Harwich for convoy escort and patrol duties in Nore Command.

== Loss ==
On 27 July 1940 Wren, alongside Montrose, was providing anti-aircraft protection for minesweeping operations off Aldeburgh, Suffolk. She came under a heavy and sustained dive bombing attack by 15 Junkers Ju 87 aircraft and was damaged by several near misses, which holed her below the waterline. Collapsed bulkheads caused heavy flooding, which led her to sink quickly, killing 37 of her crew. Wren's survivors were rescued by the minesweepers.

== Bibliography ==
- Campbell, John (1985). Naval Weapons of World War II. Annapolis, Maryland: Naval Institute Press. ISBN 0-87021-459-4.
- Chesneau, Roger, ed. (1980). Conway's All the World's Fighting Ships 1922–1946. Greenwich, UK: Conway Maritime Press. ISBN 0-85177-146-7.
- Colledge, J. J.; Warlow, Ben (2006) [1969]. Ships of the Royal Navy: The Complete Record of All Fighting Ships of the Royal Navy from the 15th Century to the Present (3rd Rev ed.). London: Chatham Publishing. ISBN 978-1-86176-281-8. OCLC 67375475.
- Cocker, Maurice. Destroyers of the Royal Navy, 1893–1981. Ian Allan. ISBN 0-7110-1075-7.
- English, John (2019). Grand Fleet Destroyers: Part I: Flotilla Leaders and 'V/W' Class Destroyers. Windsor, UK: World Ship Society. OCLC 1181228146.
- Friedman, Norman (2009). British Destroyers From Earliest Days to the Second World War. Annapolis, Maryland: Naval Institute Press. ISBN 978-1-59114-081-8.
- Gardiner, Robert & Gray, Randal, eds. (1985). Conway's All the World's Fighting Ships 1906–1921. Annapolis, Maryland: Naval Institute Press. ISBN 0-85177-245-5.
- Lenton, H. T. (1998). British & Empire Warships of the Second World War. Annapolis, Maryland: Naval Institute Press. ISBN 1-55750-048-7.
- March, Edgar J. (1966). British Destroyers: A History of Development, 1892–1953; Drawn by Admiralty Permission From Official Records & Returns, Ships' Covers & Building Plans. London: Seeley Service. OCLC 164893555.
- Preston, Antony (1971). 'V & W' Class Destroyers 1917–1945. London: Macdonald. OCLC 464542895.
- Raven, Alan & Roberts, John (1979). 'V' and 'W' Class Destroyers. Man o'War. Vol. 2. London: Arms & Armour. ISBN 0-85368-233-X.
- Rohwer, Jürgen (2005). Chronology of the War at Sea 1939–1945: The Naval History of World War Two (Third Revised ed.). Annapolis, Maryland: Naval Institute Press. ISBN 1-59114-119-2.
- Whinney, Bob (2000). The U-boat Peril: A Fight for Survival. Cassell. ISBN 0-304-35132-6.
- Whitley, M. J. (1988). Destroyers of World War 2. Annapolis, Maryland: Naval Institute Press. ISBN 0-87021-326-1.
- Winser, John de D. (1999). B.E.F. Ships Before, At and After Dunkirk. Gravesend, Kent: World Ship Society. ISBN 0-905617-91-6.
