= Herston =

Herston may refer to:

- Herston, Dorset, England
- Herston, Orkney, Scotland
- Herston, Queensland, Australia
