= HMS Malcolm (D19) =

Admiralty type flotilla leader

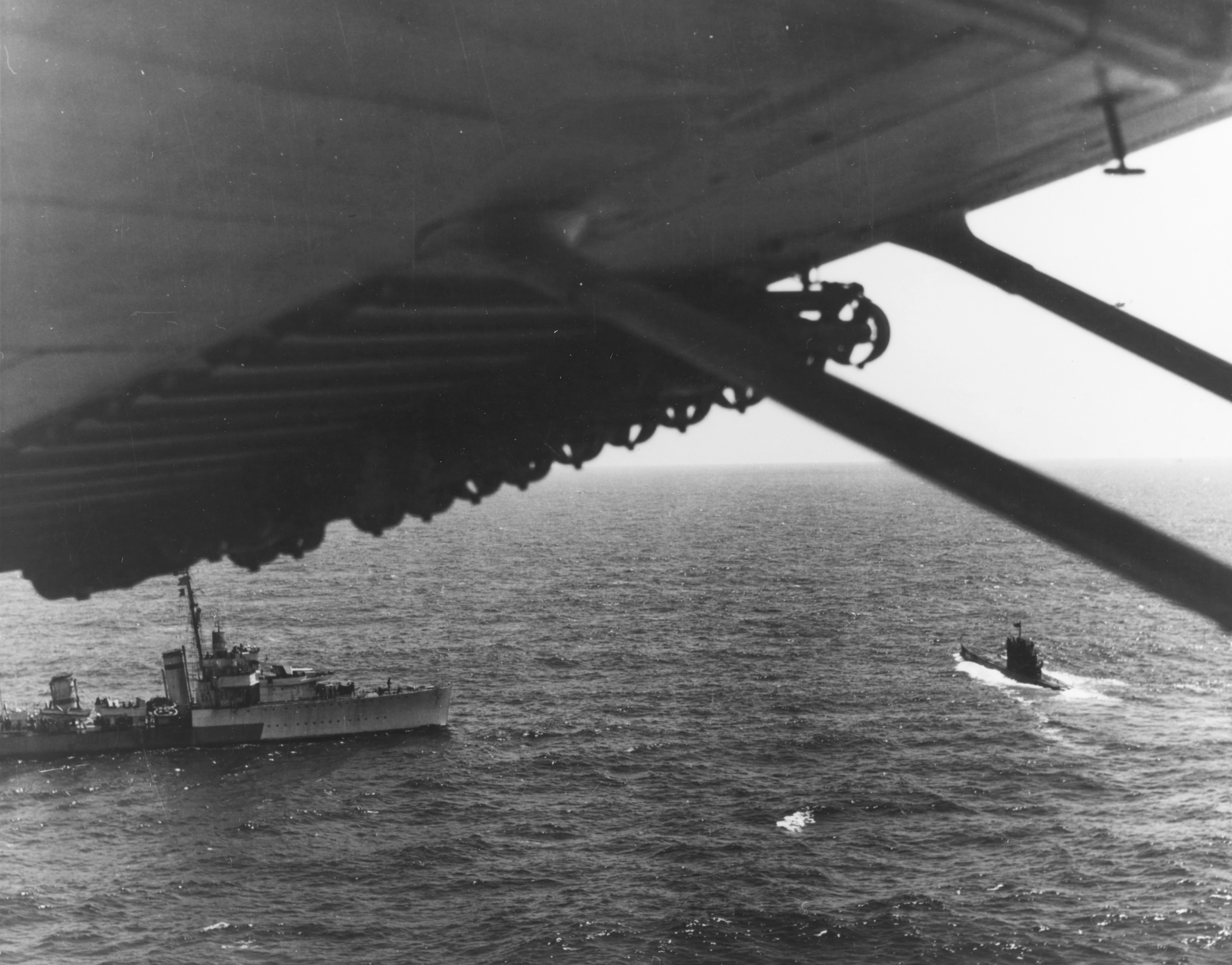
- HMS Malcolm receiving the surrender of U-541 on 11 May 1945

History

United Kingdom
- Name: Malcolm
- Builder: Cammell Laird, Birkenhead
- Laid down: 27 March 1918
- Launched: 29 May 1919
- Commissioned: 14 December 1919
- Decommissioned: 27 July 1945
- Out of service: 14 July 1945
- Motto: In ardua Tendit; (He strives in difficulties)
- Honours and awards: North Sea (1940); Dunkirk (1940); Atlantic (1940–45); Arctic (1942); Malta Convoys (1942); North Africa (1942); English Channel (1943); Atlantic (1940–43); Biscay (1943)
- Fate: Sold to be broken up for scrap on 25 July 1945
- Badge: On a field Red, a tower silver on a mount green.

General characteristics
- Class & type: Admiralty-type (or Scott-class) destroyer leader
- Displacement: 1,530 tons
- Length: 332 ft 6 in (101.35 m)
- Beam: 31 ft 9 in (9.68 m)
- Draught: 11 ft 4 in (3.45 m)
- Speed: 36.5 knots (67.6 km/h; 42.0 mph)
- Complement: 164 to 183
- Armament: 2 × BL 4.7-inch (120 mm) guns; 1 × 3-inch anti-aircraft gun; 2 × 2-pounder anti-aircraft guns; 1 × 1-pounder gun; 2 × 20 mm anti-aircraft guns; 3 × 21-inch (533 mm) torpedo tubes

HMS Malcolm was one of eight Admiralty-type destroyer leaders (known as Scott-class destroyers) built for the Royal Navy during World War I. She was the first of only two Royal Navy ships to carry the name Malcolm, although HMS Valkyrie was originally planned to bear the name. She was one of two Admiralty-type leaders to miss the First World War (the other being HMS Mackay) but saw service in, and survived, the Second World War. Her pennant number was changed from D19 to I19 in May 1940. She was broken up in 1945.

== Construction ==
In April 1916, an Admiralty type destroyer prototype (HMS Scott) was ordered in what would unofficially become known as the Scott class. Two more were ordered in December of that year, and in April 1917, Malcolm and four others were ordered. Cammell Laird built most of the class, including Malcolm.

Although two more were ordered in 1918, they were both cancelled and Malcolm became the last of the class to be completed. By the time she was launched, on 29 May 1919, the war she was built for was over and one of her class, Scott, has been sunk.

In the early 1920s, she served as part of the 5th Destroyer Flotilla, and was later put into reserve as the flotilla leader of the reserve fleet.

== Second World War ==
In September 1939, Malcolm was deployed as leader of the 16th Destroyer Flotilla, based at Portsmouth and on antisubmarine patrol of the English Channel and Southwest Approaches. She stayed in this role until May 1940, when she was transferred to Dover Command to assist with the evacuation of the Netherlands.

On 14 May 1940, she helped to transfer the Navy attaché Admiral Sir Gerald Charles Dickens and two Dutch radar researchers (J.L.C.W Von Weiler and M. Staal) from Scheveningen to the Hook, where they were transferred to HMS Wessex. On 15 May 1940, she was deployed as part of Operation Ordnance off the Hook in South Holland. From 26 May to 4 June she assisted in the evacuation of Dunkirk, making eight runs between Dunkirk and England. The ship's then commander, Sir Thomas Halsey, was appointed a Companion of the Distinguished Service Order on 7 June 1940 "for good services in the withdrawal of the Allied Armies from the beaches at Dunkirk". In July, Malcolm was reassigned to anti-invasion patrol with HMS Cardiff. On 14 August 1940, Malcolm and HMS Verity were attacked by six Kriegsmarine trawlers and three E-boats. One E-boat and one trawler were sunk in the engagement. On 10 September 1940, she attacked invasion barges in Ostend with HMS Wild Swan and HMS Veteran. A few days later, the same three ships shelled Boulogne in a sweep along the French coast. At the end of the year, she was deployed to the Western Approaches Escort Force for Atlantic convoy defence. In this role Malcolm was engaged in all the duties performed by escort ships; protecting convoys, searching for and attacking U-boats which attacked ships in convoy and rescuing survivors. In twelve months service Malcolm escorted 29 Atlantic and 3 Gibraltar convoys, of which 10 were attacked and she was involved in two major convoy battles. In February 1941 Malcolm joined the newly formed 8th Escort Group as senior ship, her captain, Cdr C D Howard–Johnston, being Senior Officer Escort (SOE). On 10 May, Malcolm rescued the eleven survivors from Empire Caribou, which had been torpedoed and sunk by U-556. They were later landed at Reykjavík.

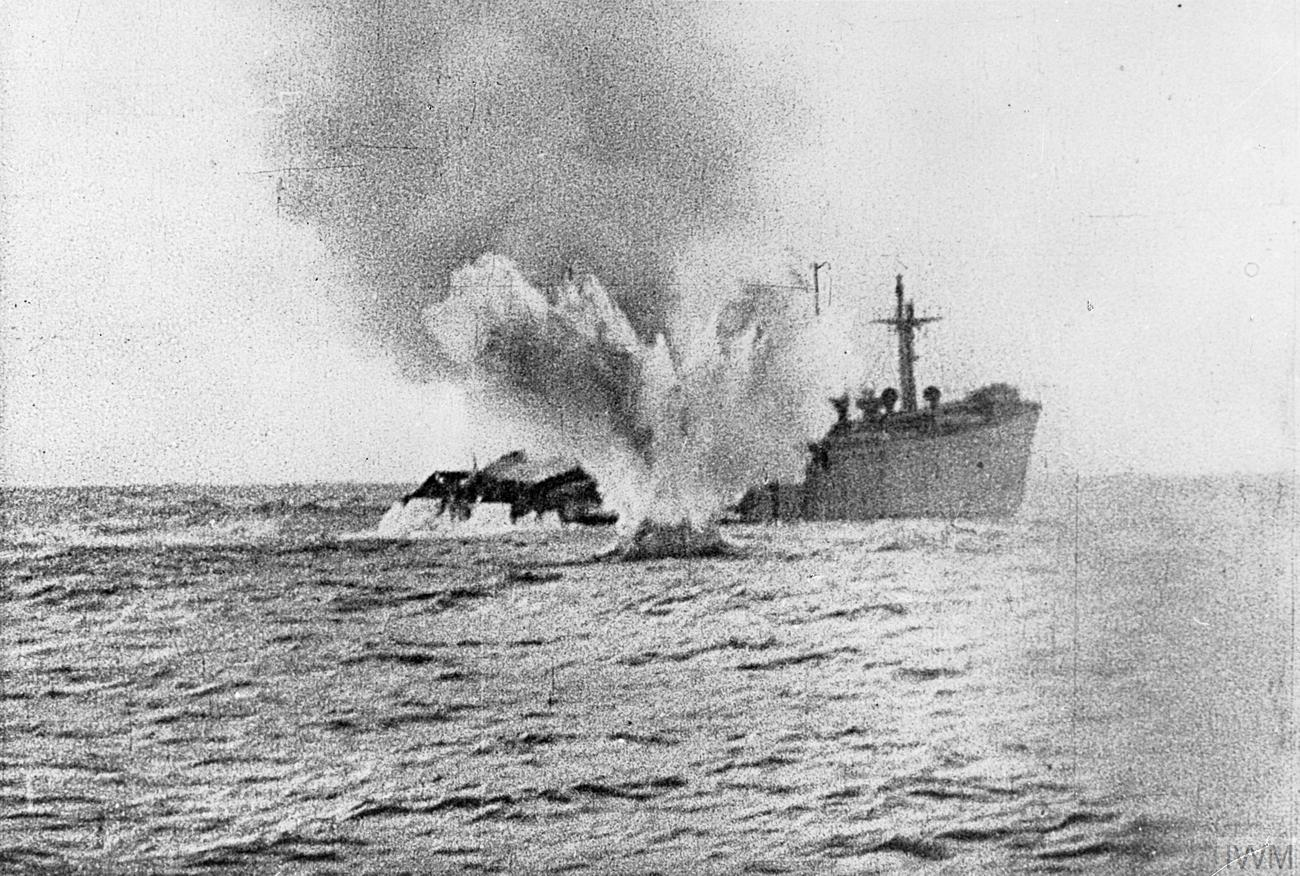
Typical escort duty; ship under attack from U-boats

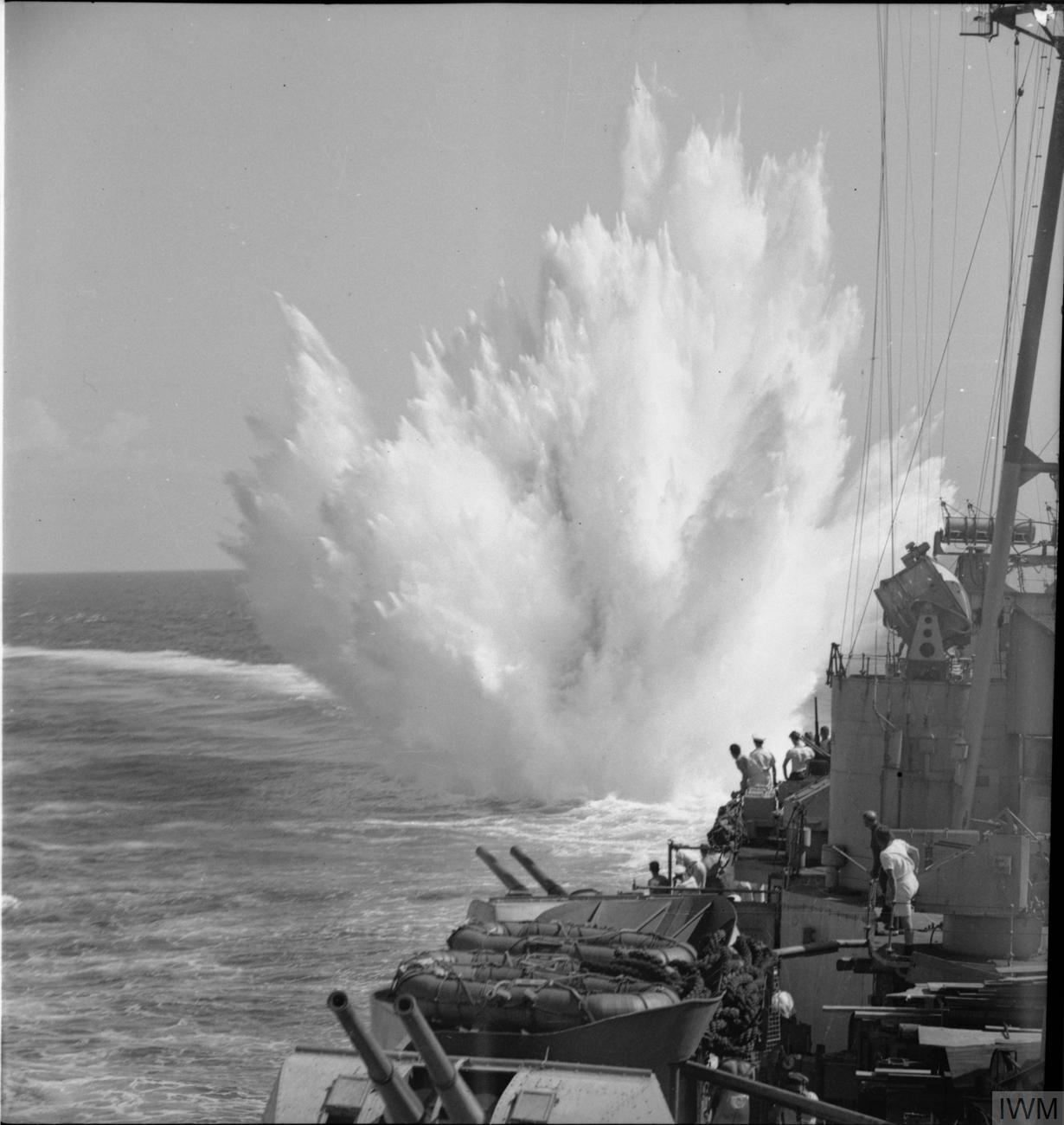
Typical escort duty: attacking a U-boat contact

In May convoy HX 126 came under attack, losing 6 ships; Malcolm and 8 EG were sent as reinforcement, repelling further attacks and preventing further losses. During the action U-74 was badly damaged and forced to return to base. In June 1941 Malcolm and her group were assigned to HX 133, which had lost five ships in one night. Over the next four days the group fought off further attacks, and on 29 June 1941, Malcolm helped to sink the German U-boat U-651. 45 of her crew were later rescued and interrogated by the Admiralty.

On 3 February 1942, she collided with the Town-class destroyer HMS Burnham. Neither ship was badly damaged and both continued in their convoy defence roles. On 11 August 1942, she was transferred to Gibraltar and assigned to escort the aircraft carrier Furious from Malta after delivering Spitfires to the besieged island. Whilst escorting the carrier, on 12 August, she came under attack by the Italian submarine Dagabur. The submarine was later rammed and destroyed by HMS Wolverine. On 7 September her next escort duty was the Arctic convoy PQ 18 to the Soviet Union in which she was leader of the close escort. She arrived in Arkhangelsk on 21 September 1942 after a seven-day running battle, in which 13 ships were sunk, while 3 U-boats were destroyed and 40 aircraft claimed shot down. In October she was in Liverpool to have extra armour plating added to her bridge and bow in preparation for the invasion of North Africa.

On 8 November 1942 Malcolm and HMS Broke were part of Operation Terminal: an amphibious assault on the port of Algiers. It was hoped, and expected by some of the operation's planners, that the Vichy French would choose not to fire on the approaching British ships, but they were proved wrong when the shore batteries opened up on both ships. Malcolm tried to break through the boom but was hit and severely damaged by a shell fired from the shore. Ten of her crew were killed, many more were injured and three of her four boilers were extinguished, cutting her speed to 4 knots (7.4 km/h; 4.6 mph). She was forced to retreat and played no further part in the operation. Although the operation did not go well, the main objective to take Algiers Harbour, before it could be destroyed, was achieved.

Malcolm was repaired and returned in her convoy escorting role on 22 January 1943, escorting convoys in the South Atlantic from Freetown to Gibraltar. Between 30 June and 24 August Malcolm was at Southampton for engine and general repairs. On 4 October Malcolm was deployed at Freetown for convoy defence. In August 1944 she left Freetown and was deployed at Gibraltar for convoy defence until 11 June 1945. On 14 June 1945 she arrived in Plymouth, at the end of July she arrived in tow at Barrow Breakers' Yard.

=== Convoys escorted ===
HMS Malcolm escorted the following convoys during the war.

KJ 002, FS 238, OB 236, HX 082, OB 239, OB 245, HX 85/1, OG 50, HG 50, OB 283, HX 106, OB 289, HX 109, OG 58, OB 311, HX 121, SC 29, HX 124, HX 126, HX 128, OB 338, HX 133, OB 344, ON 1, HX 140, ON 6, HX 143, ON 11, SC 41, ON 16, HX 149, ON 23, HX 153, ON 30, SC 51, PQ 18, KX 4A, KMF 1, TS 40F, SR 5/1, CG 37, KMF 24, MKF 24, RS 10, SR 6/1, RS 11, SR 7/1, RS 12, SR 8, SR 9, RS 14, SR 10, RS 15, SR 12, RS 16, SR 13, RS 17, STL 23, STL 26, LTS 27 and MKF 41.
