= 11th Destroyer Flotilla =

- Active: August 1915 – September 1945
- Country: United Kingdom
- Branch: Royal Navy
- Size: Flotilla

Commanders
- First: Commodore James R. P. Hawksley
- Last: Captain Philip Louis Vian

The British 11th Destroyer Flotilla, or Eleventh Destroyer Flotilla, was a naval formation of the Royal Navy from August 1915 to September 1945.

== History ==
=== World War One ===
The 11th Destroyer Flotilla was formed in August 1915 and was assigned to the Grand Fleet. It took part in the Battle of Jutland, and then remained with Grand Fleet until November 1918. Initially the formation consisted of sixteen M class destroyers, some of which were replaced by R class destroyers. For most of 1918 the flotilla was mainly using V and W-class destroyers. The flotilla was disbanded in March 1919, but was briefly reformed during the Interwar period.

=== Interwar period ===
The flotilla was briefly reformed from 1 July 1935 to 30 August 1935 under the command of Captain Ernest R. Archer (later Vice-Admiral).

=== Second World War ===
The flotilla was reformed in 1939 and was attached to the Plymouth Command until 1940 when its ships were dispersed among various escort groups. It was re-established again in August 1942 as part of the Mediterranean Fleet until January 1943. It was reassigned to the Indian Ocean area as part of the Battle Fleet of the Eastern Fleet until September 1945.

== Administration ==
=== Captains (D) afloat 11th Destroyer Flotilla ===
Incomplete list of post holders included:

	Rank	Name	Term	Notes
Captain (D) afloat 11th Destroyer Flotilla
1	Commodore	James R. P. Hawksley	1915 – 31 May 1916	later Vadm.
2	Captain	Edward O. Gladstone	30 June 1916 – January, 1918	
3	Captain	Brien M. Money	January, 1918 – 1 March 1919	later Vadm.
4	Captain	Ernest R. Archer	1 July 1935 – 30 August 1935	later Adm.
5	Captain	Philip L. Vian	June, 1939 – 13 December 1939	later Adm. of the Fleet.

== Composition ==
Included:
(United Kingdom) , Plymouth Command September 1939
11th Destroyer Flotilla

- HMS Mackay (leader)

Division 21

- HMS Vanoc
- HMS Vanquisher
- HMS Walker
- HMS Walpole
- HMS Winchlsea

Division 22

- HMS Versatile
- HMS Vimy
- HMS Warwick
- HMS Whirlwind

== Sources ==
- Harley, Simon; Lovell, Tony. (2018) "Eleventh Destroyer Flotilla (Royal Navy) – The Dreadnought Project". www.dreadnoughtproject.org. Harley and Lovell, 29 May 2018. Retrieved 9 July 2018.
- Kindell, Don. (2012) "ROYAL NAVY SHIPS, SEPTEMBER 1939". naval-history.net. Gordon Smith.
- Watson, Dr Graham. (2015) Royal Navy Organisation and Ship Deployments 1900–1914". www.naval-history.net. G. Smith.
- Watson, Dr Graham. (2015) "Royal Navy Organisation and Ship Deployment, Inter-War Years 1919–1938". www.naval-history.net. Gordon Smith.
- Watson, Dr Graham. (2015) "Royal Navy Organisation in World War 2, 1939–1945". www.naval-history.net. Gordon Smith.
- Willmott, H. P. (2009). The Last Century of Sea Power, Volume 1: From Port Arthur to Chanak, 1894–1922. Bloomington, IN, USA: Indiana University Press. ISBN 0253003563.
