= HMS Garth (L20) =

Destroyer of the Royal Navy

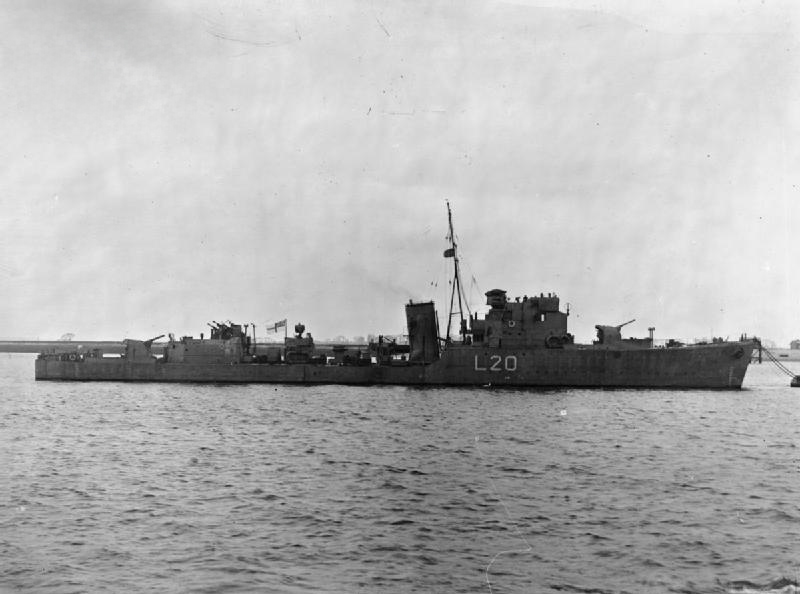
- HMS Garth, 1941

History

United Kingdom
- Name: HMS Garth
- Ordered: 21 March 1939
- Builder: John Brown & Company, Clydebank
- Laid down: 8 June 1939
- Launched: 14 February 1940
- Completed: 8 June 1940
- Identification: Pennant number: L20
- Honours and awards: North Sea 1941-45; English Channel 1942-44; Dieppe 1942; Normandy 1944
- Fate: Scrapped in August 1958
- Badge: On a Field Red. a Pendant from a cross-crosslet fitchy White a bugle horn stringed Gold

General characteristics
- Class & type: Type I Hunt-class destroyer
- Displacement: 1,000 long tons (1,000 t) standard; 1,340 long tons (1,360 t) full load
- Length: 85 m (278 ft 10 in) o/a
- Beam: 8.8 m (28 ft 10 in)
- Draught: 3.27 m (10 ft 9 in)
- Propulsion: 2 Admiralty 3-drum boilers; 2 shaft Parsons geared turbines, 19,000 shp (14,000 kW)
- Speed: 27.5 knots (31.6 mph; 50.9 km/h); 26 kn (30 mph; 48 km/h) full
- Range: 3,500 nmi (6,500 km) at 15 kn (28 km/h); 1,000 nmi (1,900 km) at 26 kn (48 km/h)
- Complement: 146
- Armament: 4 × QF 4-inch (102 mm) Mark XVI guns on twin mounts Mk. XIX; 4 × QF 2-pounder (40 mm) Mk VIII AA guns on quad mount MK.VII; 2 × 20-mm Oerlikon AA guns on single mounts P Mk. III; 40 depth charges, 2 throwers, 1 rack

HMS Garth was a Type I Hunt-class destroyer of the Royal Navy built by John Brown & Company on the River Clyde, and launched on 28 December 1939. She was adopted by the Civil Community of Wokingham, Berkshire, as part of the Warship Week campaign in 1942.

== Service history ==
On commissioning in 1940 Garth completed work ups for service in Home waters, including the Northwestern approaches and the English Channel. She provided escort cover for the monitor HMS Erebus during the evacuation of Dunkirk. In November 1940 along with HMS Campbell she sunk the E-Boat S38 off Southwold - the first E-Boat sunk during an attack on a coastal convoy.

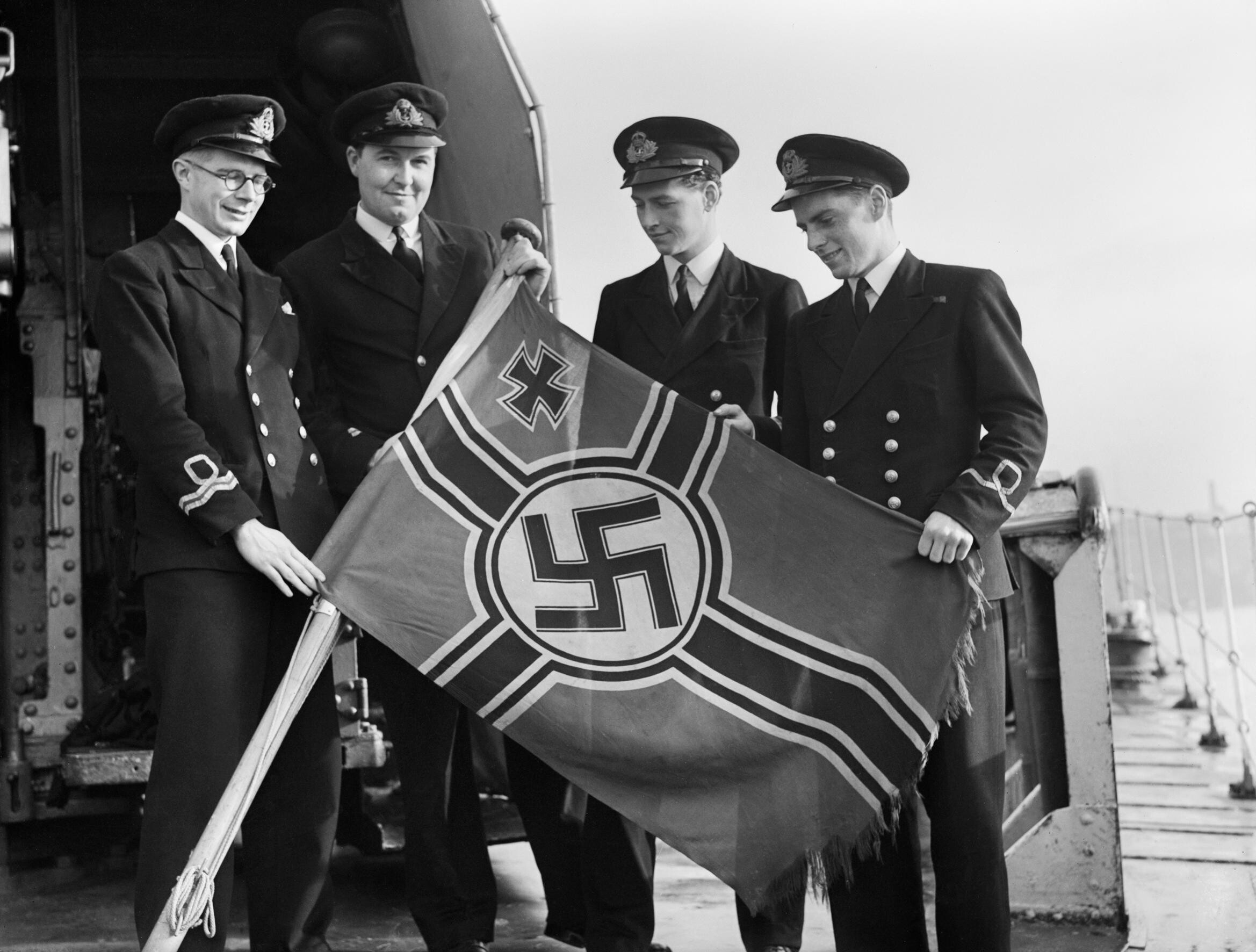
Royal Navy officers aboard HMS Garth with a captured German E-boat ensign at Sheerness, 21 October 1944. (IWM) A26034

During 1941 and 1942 she continued escort duties for convoy defence off the East coast. In 1942 she was nominated to provide cover for the Dieppe Raid (Operation Jubilee) in August 1942. Following this the destroyer continued duties in the English Channel and North sea. In February 1943 Garth rammed and sank the E-Boat S73 off Yarmouth.

In April 1944 Garth was nominated to provide support for the Allied landings in Normandy. In October 1944 she provided naval gunfire support ahead of the Allied assault on Walcheren, which defended the Scheldt estuary and port of Antwerp. She then returned to convoy escort and patrol duties in the North Sea.

In August 1945, she attended the first British Navy week in a foreign port, in Rotterdam. Also there were the cruiser HMS Bellona, and the destroyer Onslow as well as the submarine Tuna. Foreign vessels included two of the Dutch Navy submarines of the T-class, Dolfijn and Zeehond.

After August 1945 she was used as an accommodation ship at Chatham. She was subsequently placed in reserve. She was then sold to Thos. W. Ward for scrap. She arrived for scrapping at Barrow on 25 August 1958.

== Publications ==
- Colledge, J. J.; Warlow, Ben (2006) [1969]. Ships of the Royal Navy: The Complete Record of All Fighting Ships of the Royal Navy from the 15th Century to the Present (3rd Rev ed.). London: Chatham Publishing. ISBN 978-1-86176-281-8. OCLC 67375475.
- English, John (1987). The Hunts : a history of the design, development and careers of 86 destroyers of this class built for the Royal and Allied Navies during World War II. Cumbria, England: World Ship Society. ISBN 0905617444.
