= HMS Bruce =

Early 20th century Royal Navy ship

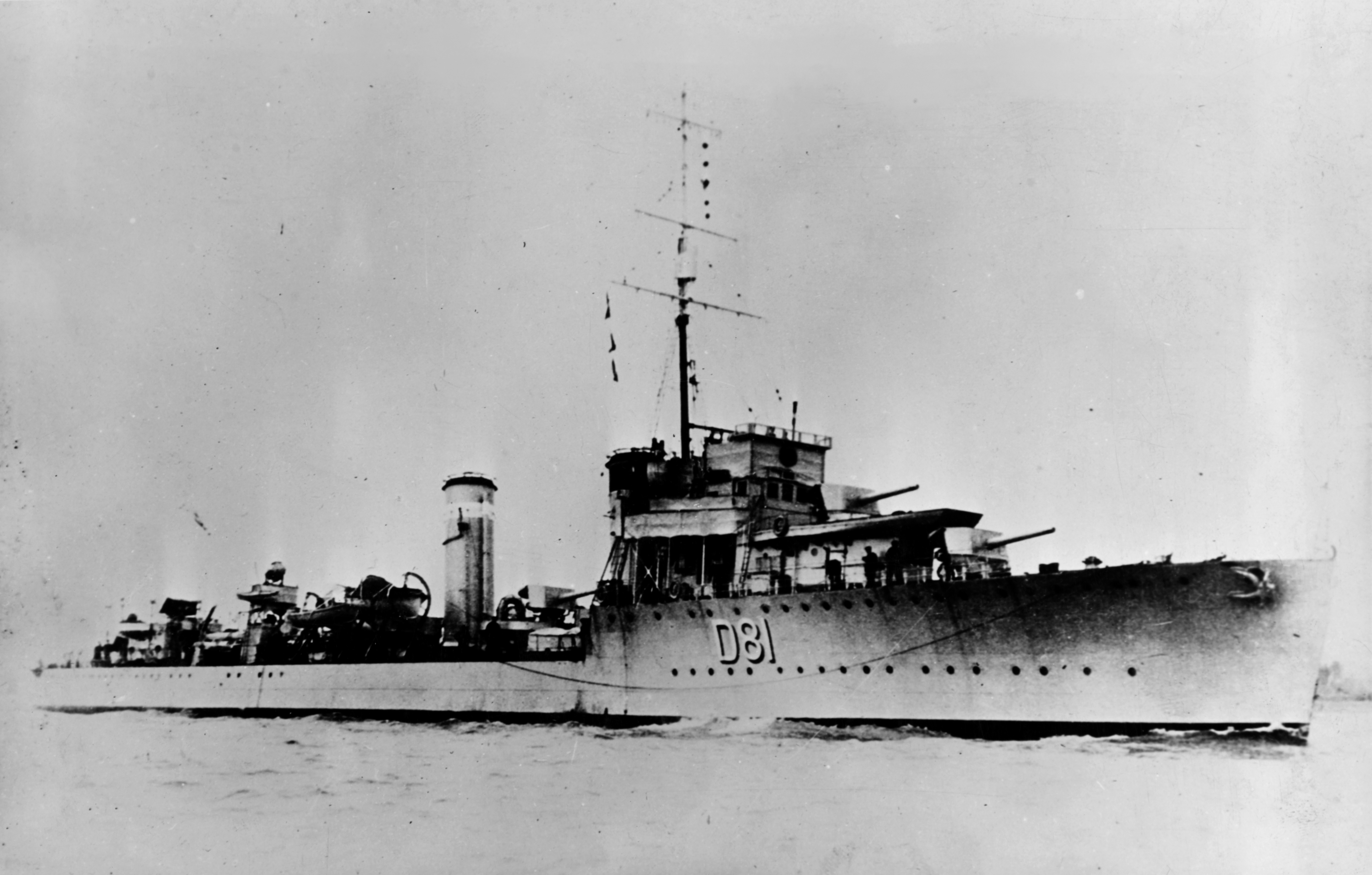
- HMS Bruce

History

United Kingdom
- Name: HMS Bruce
- Namesake: Robert the Bruce
- Ordered: April 1916
- Builder: Cammell Laird, Birkenhead
- Laid down: 12 May 1917
- Launched: 26 February 1918
- Commissioned: 29 May 1918
- Fate: Sunk as target off the Isle of Wight, 22 November 1939

General characteristics
- Class & type: Admiralty type destroyer leader
- Displacement: 1,801 long tons (1,830 t)
- Length: 332 ft 6 in (101.35 m)
- Beam: 31 ft 9 in (9.68 m)
- Draught: 12 ft 6 in (3.81 m)
- Installed power: 40,000 ihp (30,000 kW)
- Propulsion: 2 × steam engines; 2 × shafts
- Speed: 36.5 kn (42.0 mph; 67.6 km/h)
- Range: 5,000 nmi (5,800 mi; 9,300 km) at 15 kn (17 mph; 28 km/h)
- Complement: 164-183
- Armament: 5 × BL 4.7-inch (120 mm) Mk I guns; 6 × 21-inch (533 mm) torpedo tubes

HMS Bruce was the second of eight Admiralty type flotilla leaders of the Royal Navy. Built by Cammell Laird, Bruce was commissioned on 29 May 1918. During the First World War, she served with the 10th Destroyer Flotilla at Harwich. After the end of the war, Bruce spent several years in reserve at British ports, before spending almost 10 years based on the China Station. She was withdrawn from use because of her poor condition, and was sunk as a target ship on 22 November 1939.

== Design and construction ==
In December 1916, the British Admiralty placed orders for two large flotilla leaders, Bruce and HMS Douglas from Cammell Laird as a follow on to the prototype of the class, Scott, which had been ordered in April that year. The Admiralty type, or Scott-class, were designed to meet a requirement from Admiral Sir John Jellicoe, commander of the Grand Fleet, for a large, fast and heavily armed leader to match and outclass rumoured large German destroyers.

The ship was 320 feet 0 inches (97.54 m) long between perpendiculars and 332 feet 5 inches (101.32 m) overall, with a beam of 31 feet 9 inches (9.68 m) and a draught of 12 feet 6 inches (3.81 m). Design displacement was 1,580 long tons (1,610 t) normal and 2,050 long tons (2,080 t) full load. The ship's machinery consisted of four Yarrow boilers that fed steam at 250 pounds per square inch (1,700 kPa) to two sets of Parsons single-reduction geared-steam turbines, rated at 40,000 shaft horsepower (30,000 kW). This gave a speed of 35 kn (40 mph; 65 km/h). Up to 500 tons of oil were carried, giving a radius of 3,390 nmi (3,900 mi; 6,280 km) at 15 kn (17 mph; 28 km/h).

The class had a main gun armament consisted of five 4.7 in (120 mm)/45 calibre BL Mark I guns, (Note: In British practice, BL (Breech Loading) indicated that a separate, bagged, charge was used.) on CP VI mountings capable of elevating to 30 degrees, arranged in two superfiring pairs fore and aft of the superstructure, with the remaining gun positioned on a platform between the funnels. Anti-aircraft armament consisted of a single 3 in (76 mm) gun on a platform abaft the rear funnel together with a pair of single two-pounder (40mm) pom-pom autocannon for close-in protection on single mounts. Torpedo armament consisted of two triple mounts for 21-inch (533 mm) torpedo tubes between the 3-inch AA gun and the rear pair of 4.7-inch guns. Crew was 183–188 officers and men.

Bruce, named for Robert Bruce, was laid down at Cammell Laird's Birkenhead shipyard on 12 May 1917, launched on 26 February 1918 and commissioned on 30 May 1918. (Note: Preston states that Bruce was completed on 29 May 1918.)

== Service ==
After commissioning, Bruce underwent continued trials during May 1918, joining the 10th Destroyer Flotilla, part of the Harwich Force, as one of four leaders for this large flotilla on 5 June 1918. (Note: In addition to the four leaders, the flotilla comprised 24 destroyers.) On 10 August 1918, Bruce took part in a sweep by the Harwich Force against German minesweeping forces in the southern part of the North Sea. The force, consisting of four light cruisers and fourteen destroyers and leaders, would tow six Coastal Motor Boats (CMBs) to the edge of the mined areas in the inner German Bight. From there, the CMBs would proceed over the minefields and search for German minesweepers, which they were to attack with torpedoes. Air cover was to be provided by flying boats carried on lighters towed behind three of the destroyers, while two more destroyers towed lighters carrying Sopwith Camel fighter aircraft, for use against German Zeppelin airships. When the force reached the minefields, the lack of wind meant that the flying boats could not take off, so the CMBs continued on unescorted, and were subject to sustained attacks by German aircraft, which resulted in three of the CMBs being sunk and the other three being interned in the Netherlands. Meanwhile, the Harwich Force, waiting for the CMBs to return, encountered the German airship L53, and a Camel took off from a lighter towed behind the destroyer Redoubt and shot down L53.

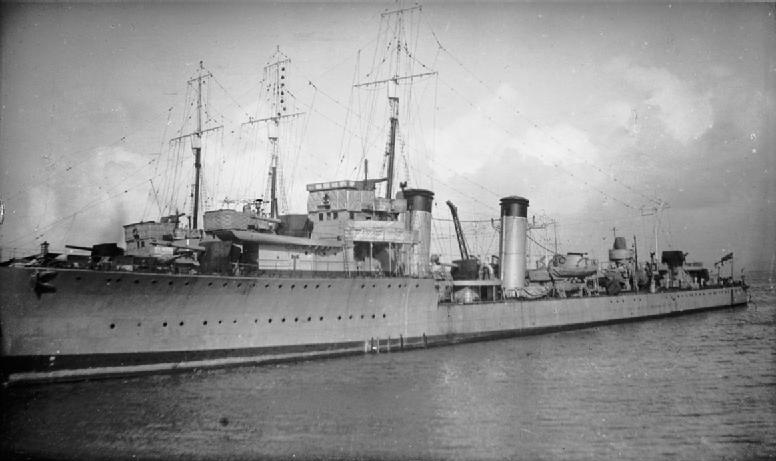
HMS Bruce

Bruce was still part of the 10th Flotilla at the end of the war, and on 20 and 22 November, helped to escort German submarines that were surrendering under the terms of the Armistice of 11 November 1918 into Harwich. The Grand Fleet was broken up after the end of the war, with new destroyer flotillas formed, and by March 1919, Bruce was listed as leader of the newly established 7th Destroyer Flotilla, a reserve formation based at Rosyth. By December 1919, Bruce was serving as leader and Captain (D)'s flagship for the 4th Destroyer Flotilla, part of the Atlantic Fleet, and she remained part of the 4th Flotilla in January 1921. On 5 October 1921, Bruce was involved in a minor collision with the destroyer Vendetta, and by the end of the year was again laid-up in reserve at Rosyth with a reduced complement as part of the 9th Destroyer Flotilla. From October 1922, Bruce was part of the 8th Destroyer Flotilla, but on 3 September 1924, returned to full active commission in the 1st Destroyer Flotilla as a temporary replacement for the leader Wallace, reducing back to a reduced (2/5) complement with the 8th Flotilla on 20 November that year.

In January 1927, Bruce returned to active service as the 8th Flotilla was sent to the China Station, to be based at Hong Kong, while operating from Weihaiwei and other northern ports during the summer. Bruce remained based in Chinese waters, both with the 8th Destroyer Flotilla and the 4th Submarine Flotilla, until January 1937. In October 1928, Bruce was reported to have rescued the passengers and crew of the coaster Kwangse, which had struck a submerged rock near Amoy. On 14 October 1931, Bruce and the destroyer Wishart responded to the capture by pirates of the steamer Helicon. In October 1936, Bruce, together with the depot ship Medway, visited the port of Keelung on the island of Formosa (now Taiwan). This visit provoked a diplomatic incident between Japan and Great Britain when three of Bruce's sailors were arrested by Japanese police and accused of failing to pay a taxi fare. The three sailors were beaten by the police, with one man having his jaw broken, and were forced to sign a confession in order to get released. The incident, and the failure of the Japanese to apologise, resulted in the cancellation of a planned visit by Admiral Charles Little, Commander-in-Chief of the China Station, to Japan.

Bruce returned to Britain via Singapore in early 1937, reaching Sheerness on 21 February that year, and going into reserve at the Nore on 21 April. In September 1937, she was moved to Portsmouth for a refit, but her poor condition resulted in the refit being abandoned, and Bruce being allocated for sale for scrap. The ship was stripped in preparation for sale by March 1939, but instead, she was assigned as a target, and was torpedoed and sunk during a test of magnetic detonators on 21 November 1939.

== Pennant numbers ==
Pennant number	From	To
F48	June 1918	October 1919
D81	November 1919	1938
