= Herston, Orkney =

Coordinates: 58.808°N 3.004°W

Herston
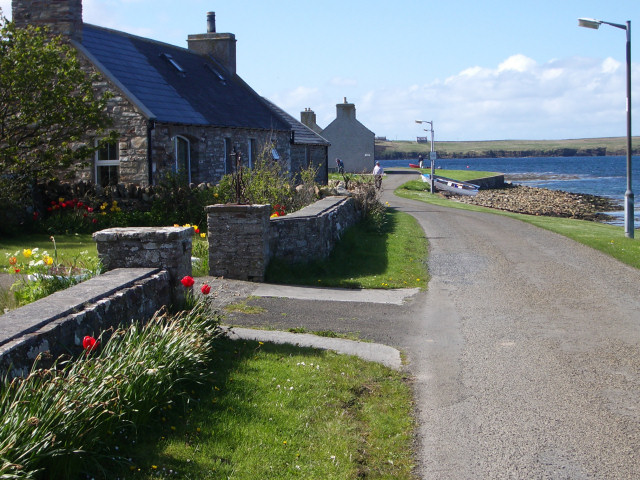
- View along the street where cottages overlook Widewall Bay

- Location within Orkney
- OS grid reference: ND420915
- Civil parish: South Ronaldsay and Burray
- Council area: Orkney
- Lieutenancy area: Orkney
- Country: Scotland
- Sovereign state: United Kingdom
- Post town: ORKNEY
- Postcode district: KW17
- Dialling code: 01856
- Police: Scotland
- Fire: Scottish
- Ambulance: Scottish
- UK Parliament: Orkney and Shetland
- Scottish Parliament: Orkney

Herston is a village on South Ronaldsay, Orkney, Scotland, United Kingdom. Herston is historically a fishing village but its only industry to speak of is Herston Stained Glass, now that Herston Hikers Hostel is now inactive.

The video for the Eurythmics song, "Here Comes the Rain Again", was partially filmed in Herston, at the wreck of the WWI-era ship, Monarch.
