= HMS Walpole =

Destroyer of the Royal Navy

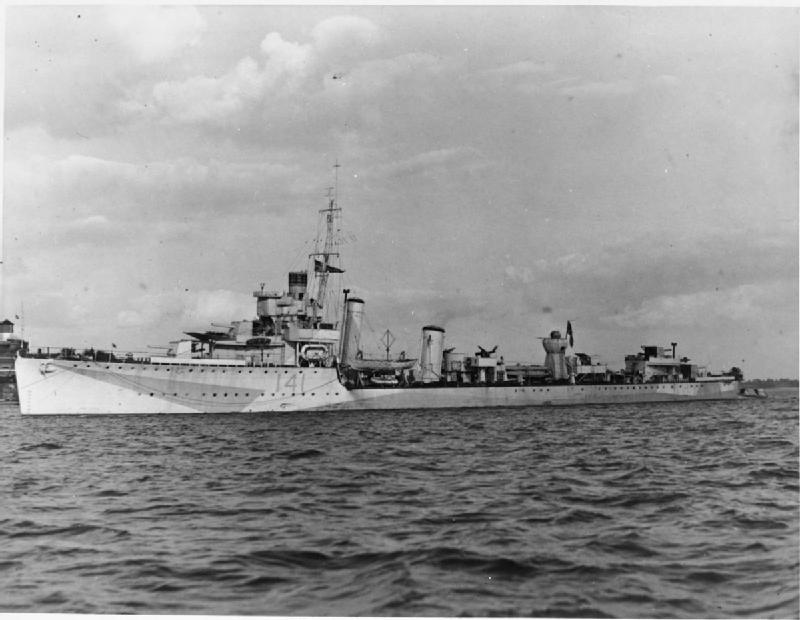
- HMS Walpole

History

United Kingdom
- Name: HMS Walpole
- Builder: William Doxford & Sons, Sunderland
- Laid down: May 1917
- Launched: 12 February 1918
- Commissioned: 7 August 1918
- Identification: Pennant number: D41
- Motto: Fari quod aentiaa: ' Speak as you feel'
- Honours and awards: Atlantic 1939–43; Dover Strait 1942; English Channel 1942–44; North Sea 1942–44; Normandy 1944
- Fate: Damaged by mine on 6 January 1945; Sold for scrapping on 8 February 1945
- Badge: On a Field Black, an Antelope's head Silver, collared blue and gold, armed and chained gold

General characteristics
- Class & type: W-class destroyer
- Displacement: 1,188 tons
- Length: 312 ft (95.1 m) length overall; 300 ft (91.4 m) between perpendiculars
- Beam: 29 ft 6 in (9.0 m)
- Draught: 9 ft (2.7 m) standard; 13 ft 11 in (4.2 m) maximum
- Propulsion: 3 Yarrow-type Water-tube boilers, Brown-Curtis steam turbines, 2 shafts, 27500 shp
- Speed: 34 knots
- Range: 3,500 nmi (6,480 km) at 15 knots
- Complement: 115
- Armament: 4 × QF 4-inch (101.6 mm) Mk V guns; 2 × QF 2 pdr pom-poms; 4 × 21 inch (533 mm) Torpedo Tubes; twin QF 6 pounder 10 cwt gun (1942 – replaced ‘A’ gun)

HMS Walpole (D41) was a W-class destroyer of the Royal Navy.

The ship was built under the 1916–17 programme in the 10th Destroyer order. Walpole was assigned to the 13th Destroyer Flotilla in the Grand Fleet after completion. she was assigned to the 11th Destroyer Flotilla in September 1939 and served until almost the end of the Second World War. Her role was mostly convoy escort duties, but she took part in two combined arms operations (Operations Amsterdam and Jubilee) and the D-day landings (Operation Neptune). She hit a mine on 6 January 1945 and was subsequently declared a constructive total loss and broken up at Thos. W. Ward Grays, Essex in March 1945.

== Bibliography ==
- Campbell, John (1985). Naval Weapons of World War II. Annapolis, Maryland: Naval Institute Press. ISBN 0-87021-459-4.
- Chesneau, Roger, ed. (1980). Conway's All the World's Fighting Ships 1922–1946. Greenwich, UK: Conway Maritime Press. ISBN 0-85177-146-7.
- Colledge, J. J.; Warlow, Ben (2006) [1969]. Ships of the Royal Navy: The Complete Record of All Fighting Ships of the Royal Navy from the 15th Century to the Present (3rd Rev ed.). London: Chatham Publishing. ISBN 978-1-86176-281-8. OCLC 67375475.
- Cocker, Maurice. Destroyers of the Royal Navy, 1893–1981. Ian Allan. ISBN 0-7110-1075-7.
- Friedman, Norman (2009). British Destroyers From Earliest Days to the Second World War. Annapolis, Maryland: Naval Institute Press. ISBN 978-1-59114-081-8.
- Gardiner, Robert & Gray, Randal, eds. (1985). Conway's All the World's Fighting Ships 1906–1921. Annapolis, Maryland: Naval Institute Press. ISBN 0-85177-245-5.
- Lenton, H. T. (1998). British & Empire Warships of the Second World War. Annapolis, Maryland: Naval Institute Press. ISBN 1-55750-048-7.
- March, Edgar J. (1966). British Destroyers: A History of Development, 1892–1953; Drawn by Admiralty Permission From Official Records & Returns, Ships' Covers & Building Plans. London: Seeley Service. OCLC 164893555.
- Preston, Antony (1971). 'V & W' Class Destroyers 1917–1945. London: Macdonald. OCLC 464542895.
- Raven, Alan & Roberts, John (1979). 'V' and 'W' Class Destroyers. Man o'War. Vol. 2. London: Arms & Armour. ISBN 0-85368-233-X.
- Rohwer, Jürgen (2005). Chronology of the War at Sea 1939–1945: The Naval History of World War Two (Third Revised ed.). Annapolis, Maryland: Naval Institute Press. ISBN 1-59114-119-2.
- Whinney, Bob (2000). The U-boat Peril: A Fight for Survival. Cassell. ISBN 0-304-35132-6.
- Whitley, M. J. (1988). Destroyers of World War 2. Annapolis, Maryland: Naval Institute Press. ISBN 0-87021-326-1.
- Winser, John de D. (1999). B.E.F. Ships Before, At and After Dunkirk. Gravesend, Kent: World Ship Society. ISBN 0-905617-91-6.
