= HMS Scott (1917) =

Admiralty type flotilla leader

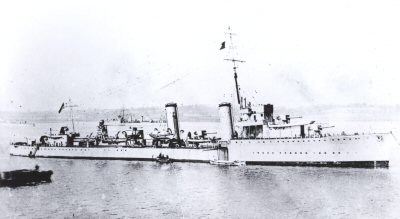
- HMS Scott

History

United Kingdom
- Name: Scott
- Namesake: Sir Walter Scott
- Ordered: April 1916
- Builder: Cammell Laird, Birkenhead
- Laid down: 19 February 1917
- Launched: 18 October 1917
- Completed: 16 January 1918
- Fate: Sunk, 15 August 1918

General characteristics (as built)
- Class & type: Admiralty type flotilla leader
- Displacement: 1,580 long tons (1,610 t) (normal)
- Length: 332 ft 6 in (101.3 m) (o/a)
- Beam: 31 ft 9 in (9.7 m)
- Draught: 12 ft (3.7 m)
- Installed power: 4 × Yarrow boilers; 40,000 ihp (30,000 kW)
- Propulsion: 2 × steam engines; 2 × shafts
- Speed: 36.5 knots (67.6 km/h; 42.0 mph)
- Range: 5,000 nmi (9,300 km; 5,800 mi) at 15 knots (28 km/h; 17 mph)
- Complement: 164–183
- Armament: 5 × single 4.7-inch (120 mm) guns; 1 × single 3 in (76 mm) AA guns; 2 × single 2-pdr (1.6 in (40 mm)) AA guns; 2 × triple 21 in (533 mm) torpedo tubes; 4 × chutes for depth charges

HMS Scott was the lead ship of her class of flotilla leaders for the V- and W-class destroyers built during the First World War, and the class would unofficially be named after her. Completed in 1918, the ship was assigned to the Harwich Force and was sunk by either a naval mine or by a German submarine in August while escorting a convoy. The ship herself was the first to bear the name Scott and was named after Sir Walter Scott, 1st Baronet.

== Design and description ==
The Admiralty type flotilla leaders were designed by the Director of Naval Construction to meet a requirement from Admiral Sir John Jellicoe, commander of the Grand Fleet, for a large flotilla leader with better seakeeping abilities than the Lightfoot-class. The ships had an overall length of 332 feet 6 inches (101.3 m), a beam of 31 feet 9 inches (9.7 m) and a draught of 12 feet (3.7 m) at deep load. They displaced 1,580 long tons (1,605 t) at normal load. Their crew consisted of 188 officers and ratings. Scott was powered by two Parsons geared steam turbine sets, each driving one shaft, using steam provided by four Yarrow boilers. The turbines were rated at 40,000 shp (30,000 kW) for a speed of 36.5 knots (67.6 km/h; 42.0 mph). When the ship ran her sea trials, she reached 35.8 knots (66.3 km/h; 41.2 mph) from 46,733 shp (34,849 kW). The Admiralty type leaders carried enough fuel oil to give them a range of 5,000 nautical miles (9,300 km; 5,800 mi) at 15 knots (28 km/h; 17 mph).

The ships were armed with five BL 4.7-inch (120 mm) guns in single mounts protected by gun shields. They were arranged in two superfiring pairs fore and aft of the superstructure and the remaining gun was positioned on a platform between the funnels. While under construction, the ships were altered to accommodate a single 3 in (76 mm) AA gun on a platform abaft the rear funnel and a pair of single two-pounder (1.6 in (40 mm)) AA guns on single mounts. They were also fitted with two triple mounts for 21-inch (533 mm) torpedo tubes between the 3-inch AA gun and the rear pair of 4.7-inch guns. For anti-submarine work, they were equipped with four depth charges in individual chutes at the stern.

== Construction and career ==
Scott was laid down by Cammell Laird at their shipyard in Birkenhead on 19 February 1917, launched on 18 October 1917 and completed on 16 January 1918 at a cost of £342,570, complete with guns and ammunition. After working up, the ship was assigned to the 10th Destroyer Flotilla in the Harwich Force. While escorting a small convoy from the Netherlands to England on 15 August, the destroyer HMS Ulleswater was struck by either a mine or a torpedo near the Dutch coast. While manoeuvreing to assist the stricken ship, Scott was hit twice in quick succession, the first of which detonated her forward magazine. The ship sank about fifteen minutes later with the loss of 22 crewmen. The cause of her sinking is unclear, although the German submarine U-71 which had been patrolling and mining the area is usually credited with her sinking.

== Wreck ==
The wreck of Scott is approximately 20 nmi (37 km; 23 mi) off the Dutch coast. The wreck lies in two parts at depths of 20–28 m (66–92 ft) of water.

== Bibliography ==
- Atherton, JD. (2005). "Question 19/97: Loss of HMS Ulleswater and HMS Scott". Warship International. XLII (3): 247–248. ISSN 0043-0374.
- Colledge, J. J.; Warlow, Ben (2006) [1969]. Ships of the Royal Navy: The Complete Record of All Fighting Ships of the Royal Navy from the 15th Century to the Present (3rd Rev ed.). London: Chatham Publishing. ISBN 978-1-86176-281-8. OCLC 67375475.
- Friedman, Norman (2009). British Destroyers From Earliest Days to the Second World War. Annapolis, Maryland: Naval Institute Press. ISBN 978-1-59114-081-8.
- March, Edgar J. (1966). British Destroyers: A History of Development, 1892–1953; Drawn by Admiralty Permission From Official Records & Returns, Ships' Covers & Building Plans. London: Seeley Service. OCLC 164893555.
- Preston, Antony (1971). 'V & W' Class Destroyers 1917–1945. London: Macdonald. OCLC 464542895.
