= BL 4.7-inch 45-calibre naval gun =

BL 4.7-inch (120 mm), 45-calibre naval gun
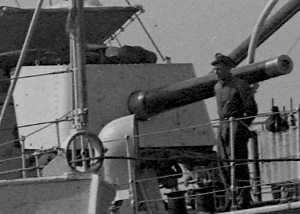
- "A" gun on destroyer HMAS Stuart, circa. 1930s
- Type: Naval gun

Service history
- In service: 1919–1948
- Used by: United Kingdom
- Wars: World War II

Production history
- Designed: Mk I: 1918; Mk II: 1940
- Produced: Mk I: 1919; Mk II: 1940
- No. built: Mk I: 187; Mk II: 32
- Variants: Mk I, Mk II (Note: Mk I = Mark 1, Mk II = Mark 2. Britain used Roman numerals to denote Marks (models) of ordnance until after World War II, and used separate number series for BL and QF guns of the same calibre. Hence these were the first (and only) two models of British BL 4.7-inch guns.)

Specifications
- Mass: Mk I: 7,000 pounds (3,200 kg); Mk II: 7,028 pounds (3,188 kg)
- Barrel length: 213 inches (5.4 m) bore (45 calibres)
- Shell: 50 pounds (22.7 kg)
- Calibre: 4.724 inches (120 mm)
- Breech: Welin breech block
- Elevation: -9.5° to +30°
- Traverse: -120° to +120°
- Rate of fire: 5-6 RPM
- Muzzle velocity: 2,670 feet per second (814 m/s)
- Maximum firing range: 15,800 yards (14,450 m) at 30°

The BL 4.7-inch, 45-calibre gun (actually a metric 120 mm gun) was a British medium-velocity naval gun introduced in 1918 for destroyers. It was designed to counter a new generation of heavily armed German destroyers that were believed to be in development.

== Description and history ==
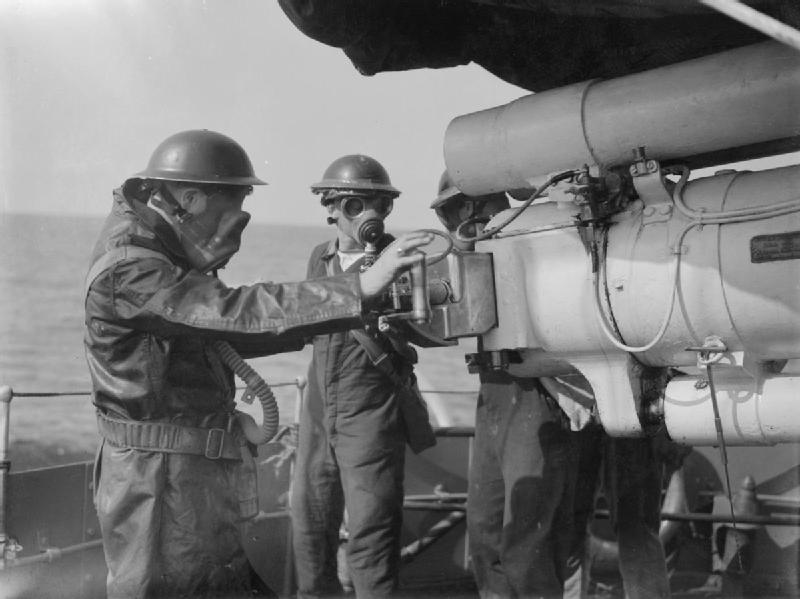
Gunners on destroyer HMS Broke, September 1940

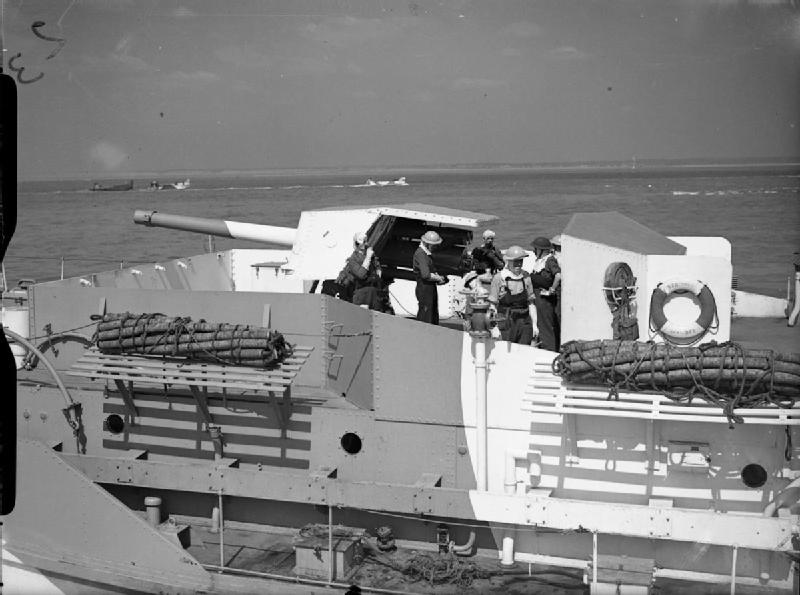
On a Landing Craft Gun (L), preparing for the Invasion of Normandy, 1944

Mk I, of built-up wire-wound construction with a propellant charge in a cloth bag, went into service beginning in 1918 on destroyers of the new Admiralty type destroyer leader (Scott class) and Thornycroft type leader (Shakespeare class). Some saw service in World War I, but most entered service after the war ended.

It was also mounted on :

- Faulknor-class flotilla leaders as re-gunned in 1918
- Thornycroft and Admiralty Modified W-class destroyers completed 1919–1920
- Prototype destroyers HMS Ambuscade and HMS Amazon commissioned in 1926 and 1927

Mk II was a monobloc-barrel (i.e. single-piece, typical of small to medium World War II guns) gun of similar performance introduced in World War II to replace the worn-out Mk I guns on surviving ships.

These were the only BL-type 4.7-inch guns in British service; all others have been of the QF-type. They were superseded on new destroyers from 1930 by the QF 4.7-inch Mk IX.

== Ammunition ==
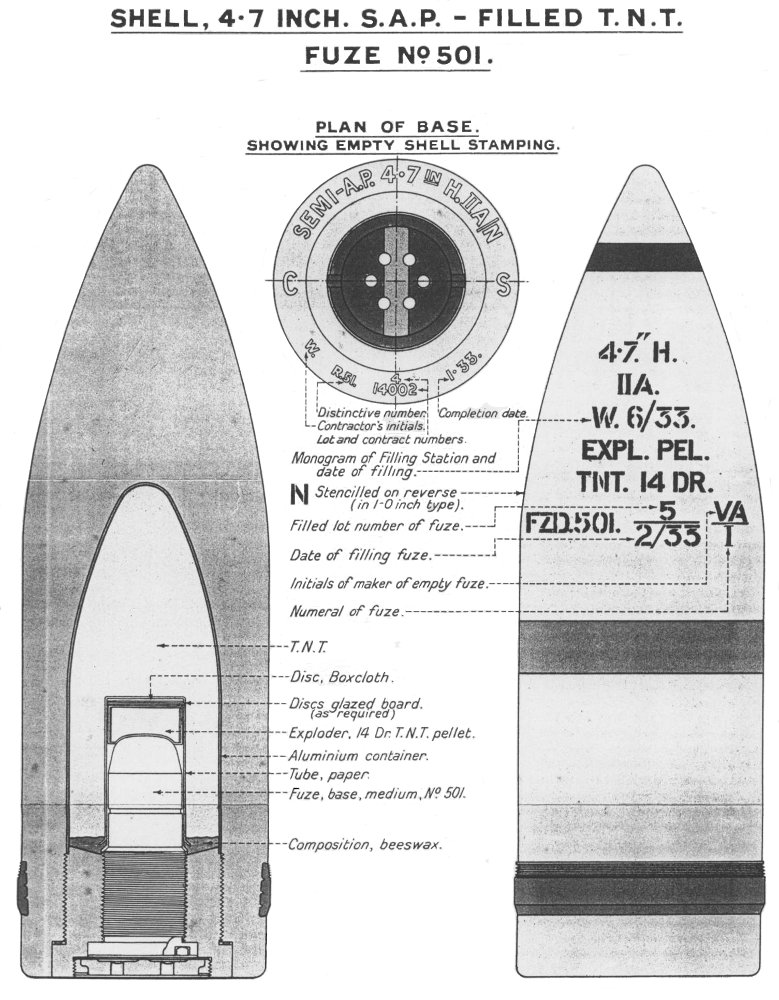
Mk IIA S.A.P. (semi-armour piercing) shell, 1933

== See also ==
- QF 4.7-inch Mk IX: British QF successor
- List of naval guns

=== Weapons of comparable role, performance and era ===
- Type 3 120 mm 45 caliber naval gun : Japanese equivalent
- 5"/51 caliber gun : US Navy equivalent

== Bibliography ==
- Tony DiGiulian, British 4.7"/45 (12 cm) BL Mark I 4.7"/45 (12 cm) BL Mark II
