= 5th Destroyer Flotilla =

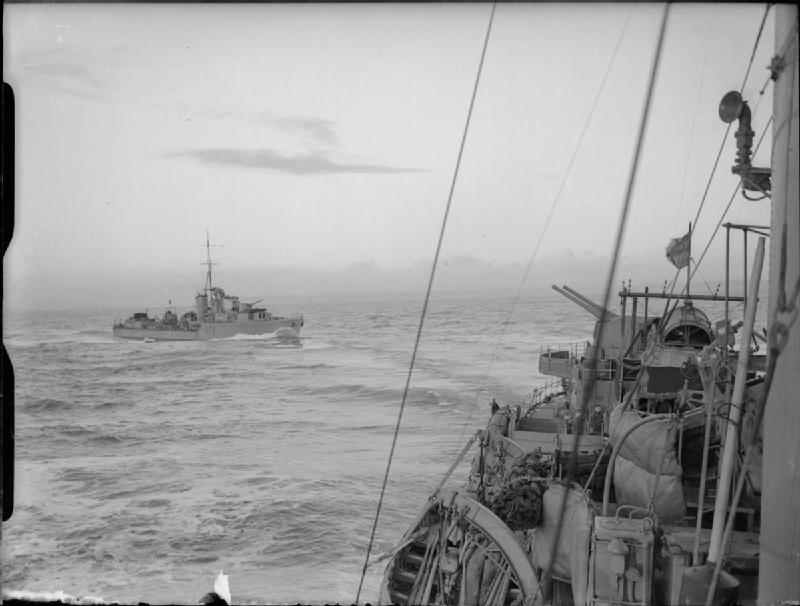
- HMS Jersey astern of HMS Kashmir of the 5th Destroyer Flotilla in 1940 or 1941.
- Active: February, 1910–1942, 1947-1951
- Country: United Kingdom
- Branch: Royal Navy
- Size: Flotilla

Commanders
- First: Captain Herbert E. Holmes-à-Court
- Last: Captain Llewellyn V. Morgan
- Notable commanders: Captain Lord Louis Mountbatten

The British 5th Destroyer Flotilla, or Fifth Destroyer Flotilla, was a naval formation of the Royal Navy from 1910 to 1942 and again from 1947 to 1951.

== History ==
The flotilla was formed in February 1910 and disbanded in 1942. Its first commander was Captain Herbert E. Holmes-à-Court and its final pre-war commander was Captain Llewellyn V. Morgan. It was reformed in June 1939 under the command of Captain Louis Mountbatten and was composed of new J- and K-class destroyers which were still under construction. The flottila participated in the Norwegian campaign and Operation Medium, the bombardment of Cherbourg in October 1940, transferring to the Mediterranean in April 1941. By the end of May 1941, the ships of the "Fighting Fifth" had been either dispersed or sunk during the Battle of Crete. The flotilla was briefly reformed at Alexandria composed of Hunt-class destroyers.

The flotilla was reactivated in March 1947 until December 1951. In 1951 which led to the creation of three specific Flag Officers, Flotillas responsible for the Eastern, Home and Mediterranean fleets the existing destroyer flotillas were re-organized now as administrative squadrons. In January 1952 it was re-designated 5th Destroyer Squadron.

== Operational deployments ==
Assigned to	Dates	Notes
Home Fleet, 3rd Division, Devonport Division	1909 to 1912	
Admiral of Patrols	March 1909 to 1913	transferred to Mediterranean
Mediterranean Fleet	August 1914 to November 1918	
Home Fleet	April to November 1919	
Atlantic Fleet	1921 to April 1925	dispersed ships to 1DF Med.
Home Fleet	September 1939 to April 1941	reformed detached Humber Force
Western Approaches Command	September 1940 to February 1941	
Plymouth Command	February to March 1941	
Mediterranean Fleet	1 July 1941 to 1 August 1942	disbanded
Levant Command	29 January 1943 to 1 October 1943	reformed
Mediterranean Fleet	2 October 1943 to May 1945	
Home Fleet	June 1945 to 1951	re-designated 5th Destroyer Squadron

== Captains (D) afloat 5th Destroyer Flotilla ==
Incomplete list of post holders included:

- Captain Herbert Edward Holmes à Court, 8 February 1910
- Captain Noel Grant, 20 December 1910 – 20 December 1912
- Captain Edward G. Lowther-Crofton, 1 May 1912] – 27 January 1914
- Captain Charles P. R. Coode, 1 February 1914 – 15 May 1917
- Captain F. Clifton Brown, 30 May 1917 – 15 August 1917
- Captain George Chetwode, 15 August 1917
- Captain Kerrison Kiddle, 1 March 1919 – 1 October 1919
- Captain Theodore E. J. Bigg, 25 June 1921 – 16 August 1922
- Captain Cyril Cameron, 16 August 1922 – 30 April 1924
- Captain Edward O. B. S. Osborne, 28 April 1924
- Commander Reginald V. Holt, January, 1925 – 8 February 1925
- Captain Edward O. B. S. Osborne, 10 February 1925
- Captain Kenneth MacLeod, 1 April 1925 – 4 July 1926
- Captain James V. Creagh, 11 May 1925 – 10 October 1925
- Captain Lewis G. E. Crabbe, 4 July 1926 – 16 August 1927
- Captain Lewis G. E. Crabbe, June, 1927
- Captain Frank Elliott, 16 August 1927 – 16 August 1929
- Captain Ronald H. C. Hallifax, 16 August 1929 – 16 August 1931
- Captain Geoffrey R. S. Watkins, 16 August 1931 – 24 April 1933
- Captain Lumley Lyster, 11 November 1932 – 30 April 1935
- Captain Harold Burrough, 30 April 1935 – 16 June 1937
- Captain Llewellyn V. Morgan, 16 June 1937 – 1 May 1939
- Captain Lord Louis Mountbatten, 1 June 1939 - 31 May 1941

== Composition ==
=== Mediterranean Fleet, August 1914 to November 1918 ===
- 16 x G-class destroyers

=== Atlantic Fleet, April 1925 ===
- HMS Malcolm (Leader)
- HMS Vanessa
- HMS Vanity
- HMAS Vendetta
- HMS Vesper
- HMS Vivacious
- HMS Voyager
- HMS Walrus
- HMS Wryneck

=== Atlantic Fleet, October 1934 ===
- HMS Wallace (Leader)
- HMS Vimy
- HMS Velox
- HMS Versatile
- HMS Vortigern
- HMS Walker
- HMS Warwick
- HMS Watchman
- HMS Wessex

=== Home Fleet, July 1939 ===
- HMS Exmouth (Leader)
- HMS Echo
- HMS Eclipse
- HMS Electra
- HMS Encounter
- HMS Escapade
- HMS Escort
- HMS Esk
- HMS Express

Nore Command, Harwich Sub Command, June 1940

- HMS Jackal
- HMS Jaguar
- HMS Javelin
- HMS Jersey at Kingston upon Hull, repairing to complete 23 September
- HMS Jervis
- HMS Kashmir
- HMS Kelly at Tyneside, repairing to complete 18 December
- HMS Kelvin
- HMS Kipling at Southampton, repairing to complete 16 July

Western Approaches Command, Plymouth, January 1941

- HMS Kelly (Leader)
- HMS Jupiter
- HMS Kipling
- HMS Jaguar
- HMS Jersey
- HMS Kipling

Mediterranean Fleet, Alexandria, January 1942

- HMS Avon Vale
- HMS Beaufort at Freetown
- HMS Dulverton
- HMS Eridge at Tobruk
- HMS Farndale at Tobruk
- HMS Heythrop
- Hurworth at Freetown

Home Fleet from March 1947
5th Destroyer Flotilla:

- HMS Solebay (Leader)
- HMS Cadiz
- HMS Gabbard
- HMS St. James
- HMS St. Kitts
- HMS Sluys

Home Fleet 1947
5th Destroyer Flotilla

- HMS Solebay (Leader)
- HMS Cadiz
- HMS Gabbard
- HMS St. James
- HMS St. Kitts
- HMS Sluys

Home Fleet 1948
5th Destroyer Flotilla

- HMS Solebay (Leader)
- HMS Cadiz
- HMS Gabbard
- HMS St. James
- HMS St. Kitts
- HMS Sluys

Home Fleet 1949
5th Destroyer Flotilla

- HMS Solebay (Leader)
- HMS Cadiz
- HMS Gabbard
- HMS St. James
- HMS St. Kitts
- HMS Sluys

Home Fleet 1950
5th Destroyer Flotilla

- HMS Solebay (Leader)
- HMS Cadiz
- HMS Gabbard - (September 1950)
- HMS St. James - (September 1950)
- HMS St. Kitts
- HMS Sluys

Home Fleet 1951
5th Destroyer Flotilla

- HMS Solebay (Leader)
- HMS Cadiz - later replaced by HMS Gabbard
- HMS St. Kitts - later replaced by HMS St. James
- HMS Sluys

== Sources ==
- Harley, Simon; Lovell, Tony. (2018) "Fifth Destroyer Flotilla (Royal Navy) - The Dreadnought Project". www.dreadnoughtproject.org. Harley and Lovell.
- Smith, Adrian (2010). Mountbatten: Apprentice War Lord. London: I.B. Tauris. ISBN 978-1848853744.
- Terraine, John (1980). The life and times of Lord Mountbatten. New York: Holt, Rhinehart and Winston. ISBN 0-03-056899-4.
- Whitby, Michael (2011). Commanding Canadians: The Second World War Diaries of A.F.C. Layard. Vancouver, Canada: UBC Press. ISBN 9780774840378.
- The Fifth Destroyer Flotilla on Patrol and Carrying Out Gunnery Practice at Sea. January 1941, On Board HMS Kashmir. Flotilla Leader HMS KellyY with her Flotilla For The First Time Since Her Refit". Imperial War Museums. Imperial War Museum UK.
