= HMS Warwick (D25) =

Destroyer of the Royal Navy

Coordinates: 49°11′N 13°38′W

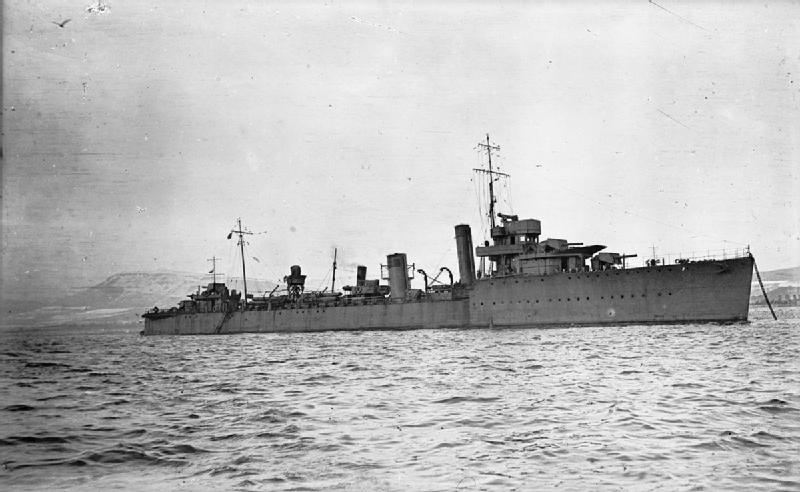
- HMS Warwick

History

United Kingdom
- Name: HMS Warwick
- Builder: Hawthorn Leslie & Company, Hebburn
- Laid down: 10 March 1917
- Launched: 28 December 1917
- Commissioned: 18 March 1918
- Fate: Sunk, 20 February 1944

General characteristics
- Class & type: Admiralty W-class destroyer
- Displacement: 1,100 tons
- Length: 312 ft (95.1 m) oa; 300 ft (91.4 m) pp
- Beam: 29 ft 6 in (9.0 m)
- Draught: 9 ft (2.7 m) standard; 13 ft 11 in (4.2 m) maximum
- Propulsion: 3 Yarrow type Water-tube boilers, Brown-Curtis steam turbines, 2 shafts, 27,000 shp (20,000 kW)
- Speed: 34 knots (63 km/h)
- Complement: 110
- Armament: 4 × QF 4 in (102 mm) L/45 Mark V guns, mounting P Mk. I; 2 × QF 2 pdr pom-pom Mk. II; 2 × Triple tubes for 21 in (533 mm) torpedoes

HMS Warwick (D25) was an Admiralty W-class destroyer built in 1917. She saw service in both the First and Second World Wars, before being torpedoed and sunk in February 1944.

== Construction and design ==
On 9 December 1916, the British Admiralty placed an order for 21 large destroyers based on the V class, which became the Admiralty W class. Of these ships, two, Warwick and Wessex were to be built by the Tyneside shipbuilder Hawthorn Leslie & Company.

Warwick was 312 feet (95.1 m) long overall and 300 feet (91.4 m) between perpendiculars, with a beam of 26 feet 6 inches (8.08 m) and a draught of between 10 feet 9 inches (3.28 m) and 11 feet 11 1/2 inches (3.64 m) depending on load. Displacement was 1,100 long tons (1,100 t) standard, and up to 1,490 long tons (1,510 t) deep load. Three oil-fed Yarrow boilers raising steam at 250 pounds per square inch (1,700 kPa) fed Brown-Curtis geared steam turbines which developed 27,000 shaft horsepower (20,000 kW), driving two screws for a maximum designed speed of 34 knots (63 km/h; 39 mph). The ship carried 368 long tons (374 t) of oil giving a range of 3,500 nautical miles (6,500 km; 4,000 mi) at 15 knots (28 km/h; 17 mph).

Warwick's main gun armament consisted of four 4-inch Mk V QF guns in four single mounts on the ship's centerline. These were disposed as two forward and two aft in superimposed firing positions. A single QF 3-inch (76 mm) 20 cwt (Note: "Cwt" is the abbreviation for hundredweight, 20 cwt referring to the weight of the gun.) anti-aircraft gun was mounted aft of the second funnel. Aft of the 3-inch gun, she carried six 21-inch torpedo tubes mounted in two triple mounts on the center-line. Warwick was one of 13 V and W-class destroyers converted for minelaying during the First World War, with rails for up to 66 mines fitted.

Warwick was laid down at Leslie's Hebburn shipyard on 10 March 1917. She was launched on 28 December 1917 and completed 18 March 1918. She was the sixth ship with the name Warwick to be commissioned into the Royal Navy.

== Service history ==
=== First World War ===
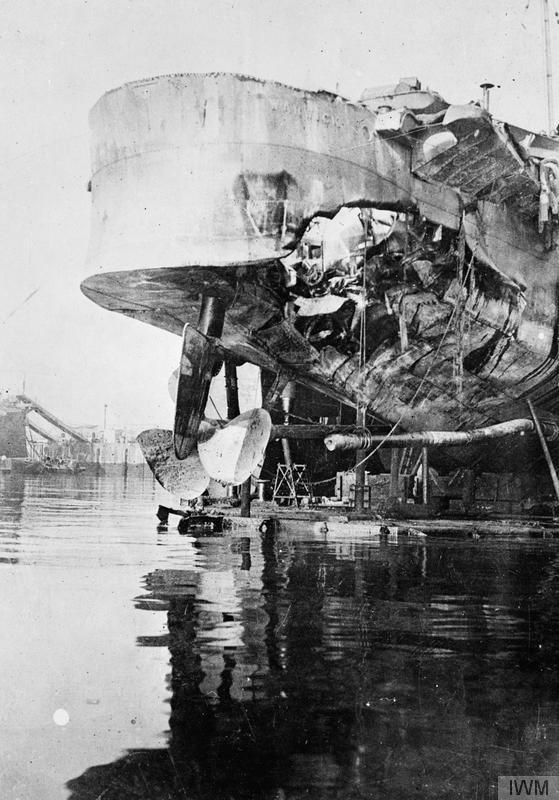
In dock after striking a mine following the second attempt to block the ship canal channel during the second raid on Ostend, 10 May 1918

Warwick commissioned on 21 February 1918, joining the Sixth Destroyer Flotilla, part of the Dover Patrol, seeing action in the last months of the First World War. She took part in the raid on Zeebrugge on the night of 22/23 April, the attempt by the RN to blockade Germany's U-boat force stationed in Flanders, acting as flagship of Vice-Admiral Roger Keyes. Warwick help to lay smoke screens to cover the assault forces, and then covered the withdrawal of the small craft carrying the survivors of the crews of the block ships. She also participated in the second raid on Ostend on 10 May, again serving as Keyes' flagship. As the force withdrew, Warwick came alongside the badly damaged Motor Launch ML254, packed with survivors of the blockship Vindictive and took off the survivors from the blockship and the crew of ML 245, before scuttling the Motor Launch. As Warwick set a course away from Ostend, she struck a German mine and was heavily damaged, breaking her back, and had to be towed back to Dover by Velox and Whirlwind.

Warwick was present at Scapa Flow in November 1918 when the Grand Fleet received the surrender of the German High Seas Fleet at the end of the war.

=== Inter-war years ===
Following the completion of repairs from mine damage, Warwick recommissioned into the 14th Destroyer Flotilla on 12 January 1919. In March 1919, the Royal Navy's destroyer forces were reorganised, with Warwick joining the new First Destroyer Flotilla, operating as part of the Atlantic Fleet. From 25 June to 18 August 1919, Warwick was deployed to the Baltic Sea as part of the British Baltic campaign during the Russian Civil War, and returned again from 7 November to 30 December 1919. In 1921, the destroyer forces of the Royal Navy were again reorganised, changing from flotillas of a leader and 16 destroyers to flotillas of one leader and eight destroyers, as the 17-ship flotillas were too large to easily manage. Warwick remained part of the new, smaller First Destroyer flotilla. In June 1922, Warwick carried out patrols on Lough Foyle, between Northern Ireland and the Republic of Ireland, stopping a steamer, the Cragbue, on passage from Moville to Londonderry Port, so that police could search the ship and her passengers. On 26 September 1922, as the Chanak Crisis threatened war between Britain and Turkey, the First Destroyer Flotilla, including Warwick, left England for the Mediterranean, arriving at Çanakkale on 4 October, remaining there until March 1923. On 26 June 1924, Warwick took part in the Fleet Review at Spithead by King George V, leading the First Destroyer Flotilla in the absence of the normal leader Wallace.

In January 1926, Warwick recommissioned into the 5th Destroyer Flotilla. On 6 January 1927, Warwick along with the destroyers Velox, Vancouver and Vortigern, escorted the battlecruiser Renown carrying The Duke and Duchess of York at the start of the Royal couple's tour of Australia and New Zealand. In June–July 1929, the 5th Destroyer Flotilla, including Warwick accompanied the 2nd Cruiser Squadron on a tour of the Baltic. In November 1930, Warwick was relieved in the 5th Flotilla by Vesper, with Warwick going into reserve at Chatham. In January 1931, Warwick was ordered to replace Valhalla in the 6th Destroyer Flotilla, but on 30 March 1931, she re-entered reserve at Sheerness, and underwent a refit during which her boilers were retubed from August 1931 to January 1932. After this refit, Warwick recommissioned into the 5th Destroyer Flotilla. On 31 January 1934, Warwick was in collision with the destroyer Vortigern off Gibraltar, with both ships slightly damaged. In October 1934, (Note: July according to English.) Warwick was replaced in the 5th Flotilla by the newly completed destroyer Echo, and after being refitted at Devonport between 22 October and 9 November that year, went into reserve at Devonport. Warwick was re-commissioned into the reserve fleet on 14 July 1939.

=== Second World War ===
By the time of the Second World War, it was recognised that the V- and W-class destroyers were unsuitable for front-line fleet operations and they were deployed on anti-submarine and convoy escort duties. In September 1939 Warwick was allocated to the 11th Destroyer Flotilla, based at Devonport and part of Western Approaches Command. On 16 September 1939, Warwick rescued 11 survivors from the steamer Aviemore, which had been sunk by the German submarine U-31. In February 1940 she was deployed to the Western Approaches Escort Force for Atlantic convoy defence. In this role she was engaged in all the duties performed by escort ships; protecting convoys, searching for and attacking U-boats which attacked ships in convoy, and rescuing survivors.

In May 1940, Warwick was deployed for operations off the Norwegian coast during the Norwegian campaign, before returning to convoy duties based out of Liverpool at the end of the month. On 15–16 June 1940, Warwick and the destroyer Witch reinforced the escort of the convoy US.3, consisting of the troopships Andes, Aquitania, Empress of Britain, Empress of Canada, Mauretania and Queen Mary, carrying 14,000 Australian and New Zealand troops on the last part of the convoy's voyage to Britain. On 30 August 1940, Warwick stood by the liner Volendam after the liner, carrying 321 British children being evacuated to Canada, had been torpedoed by U-60. In November 1940, with the formation of distinct escort groups, she joined 7 EG. On 23 December 1940, Warwick was mined in the Mersey Channel and badly damaged, having to be beached. Repairs were slow, and she did not leave Liverpool until April 1942.

In May 1942, Warwick was deployed to the West Indies for operations in the Caribbean, operating from Curaçao and Trinidad until August, and then operated out of New York until December that year.

In December Warwick returned to Britain. From 26 January to 21 June 1943, she was converted to a long-range escort at Dundee. One of the ship's boilers was removed to allow extra fuel capacity, thus sacrificing speed for endurance and range and extra accommodation. A heavy depth charge armament was fitted, with 96 charges carried, which could be dropped in 14-charge patterns and a Hedgehog anti submarine mortar fitter, with two 4-inch guns removed in compensation. A Type 271 radar was fitted above the ship's bridge.

In July 1943 Warwick was on anti-submarine duties in the Bay of Biscay, supporting Operation Musketry, the Royal Air Force Coastal Command's Bay offensive. In late September to early November 1943, the destroyer took Operation Alacrity, the establishment and supply of Allied air bases in the Azores which served to close the Mid-Atlantic gap, with Warwick escorting convoys carrying airmen and supplies to set up the air bases. From 25 November 1943 to 13 January 1944, Warwick was refitted at a commercial yard in Grimsby.

In January 1944, having returned to Britain, Warwick was assigned to lead an escort group operating in the Southwest Approaches, guarding against attacks by German S-boats and submarines. On 19 February 1944, Warwick, under the command of Commander Denys Rayner, and the destroyer Scimitar were ordered from Devonport to hunt a submarine that had been reported near Trevose Head. On 20 February, Warwick was hit on the stern by a torpedo fired by the German submarine U-413, (Note: Warwick was hit by an acoustic torpedo according to Roskill, and a pattern-running circling torpedo according to Blair.) 20 nmi (23 mi; 37 km) southwest of Trevose Head. Warwick sank in minutes, after her after engine room bulkhead collapsed. Sixty-seven of Warwick's crew were killed, with 93 survivors being rescued. (Note: There were 94 survivors according to English.)

== Bibliography ==
- Blair, Clay (2000). Hitler's U-Boat War: The Hunters, 1939–1942. London: Cassell & Co. ISBN 0-304-35260-8.
- Blair, Clay (2000). Hitler's U-Boat War: The Hunted, 1942–1945. New York: Modern Library. ISBN 0-679-64033-9.
- Campbell, John (1985). Naval Weapons of World War II. Annapolis, Maryland: Naval Institute Press. ISBN 0-87021-459-4.
- Chesneau, Roger, ed. (1980). Conway's All the World's Fighting Ships 1922–1946. Greenwich, UK: Conway Maritime Press. ISBN 0-85177-146-7.
- Colledge, J. J.; Warlow, Ben (2006) [1969]. Ships of the Royal Navy: The Complete Record of All Fighting Ships of the Royal Navy from the 15th Century to the Present (3rd Rev ed.). London: Chatham Publishing. ISBN 978-1-86176-281-8. OCLC 67375475.
- Cocker, Maurice (1981). Destroyers of the Royal Navy, 1893–1981. Ian Allan. ISBN 0-7110-1075-7.
- English, John (2019). Grand Fleet Destroyers: Part I: Flotilla Leaders and 'V/W' Class Destroyers. Windsor, UK: World Ship Society. ISBN 978-0-9650769-8-4.
- Friedman, Norman (2009). British Destroyers From Earliest Days to the Second World War. Annapolis, Maryland: Naval Institute Press. ISBN 978-1-59114-081-8.
- Gardiner, Robert & Gray, Randal, eds. (1985). Conway's All the World's Fighting Ships 1906–1921. Annapolis, Maryland: Naval Institute Press. ISBN 0-85177-245-5.
- Halpern, Paul, ed. (2011). The Mediterranean Fleet, 1919–1929. Publications of the Naval Record Society. Vol. 158. Farnham, UK: Ashgate Publishing Limited. ISBN 9781409427568.
- Kemp, Paul (1999). The Admiralty Regrets: British Warship Losses of the 20th Century. Stroud, UK: Sutton Publishing. ISBN 0-7509-1567-6.
- Lenton, H. T. (1998). British & Empire Warships of the Second World War. Annapolis, Maryland: Naval Institute Press. ISBN 1-55750-048-7.
- Lenton, H. T. (1970). British Fleet and Escort Destroyers: Volume One. London: Macdonald & Co. ISBN 0-356-02950-6.
- March, Edgar J. (1966). British Destroyers: A History of Development, 1892–1953; Drawn by Admiralty Permission From Official Records & Returns, Ships' Covers & Building Plans. London: Seeley Service. OCLC 164893555.
- Miller, William H.; Hutchings, David F. (1985). Transatlantic Liners at War: The Story of the Queens. Newton Abbot, UK: David & Charles. ISBN 0-7153-8511-9.
- Newbolt, Henry (1931). Naval Operations: Vol. V. History of the Great War Based on Official Documents. London: Longmans, Green and Co.
- Preston, Antony (1971). 'V & W' Class Destroyers 1917–1945. London: Macdonald. OCLC 464542895.
- Raven, Alan & Roberts, John (1979). 'V' and 'W' Class Destroyers. Man o'War. Vol. 2. London: Arms & Armour. ISBN 0-85368-233-X.
- Rayner, Denys (1955). Escort: The Battle of the Atlantic (Second ed.). London: William Kimber.
- Rohwer, Jürgen; Hümmelchen, Gerhard (1992). Chronology of the War at Sea 1939–1945: The Naval History of World War Two. London: Greenhill Books. ISBN 1-85367-117-7.
- Rohwer, Jürgen (2005). Chronology of the War at Sea 1939–1945: The Naval History of World War Two (Third Revised ed.). Annapolis, Maryland: Naval Institute Press. ISBN 1-59114-119-2.
- Roskill, S.W. (1960). The War at Sea, Volume III Part I. London: Her Majesty's Stationery Office.
- Smith, Peter C. (2021). Naval Warfare in the English Channel 1939–1945. Barnsley, UK: Pen & Sword Maritime. ISBN 978-1-52679-189-4.
- Terry, C. Sanford, ed. (1919). Ostend and Zeebrugge 23 April – 19 May 1918: the Dispatches of Vice-Admiral Sir Roger Keyes and Other Narratives of the Operations. Oxford University Press. OCLC 543493.
- Whinney, Bob (2000). The U-boat Peril: A Fight for Survival. Cassell. ISBN 0-304-35132-6.
- Whitley, M. J. (1988). Destroyers of World War 2. Annapolis, Maryland: Naval Institute Press. ISBN 0-87021-326-1.
- Winser, John de D. (1999). B.E.F. Ships Before, At and After Dunkirk. Gravesend, Kent: World Ship Society. ISBN 0-905617-91-6.
