= HMS Walrus (D24) =

Destroyer of the Royal Navy

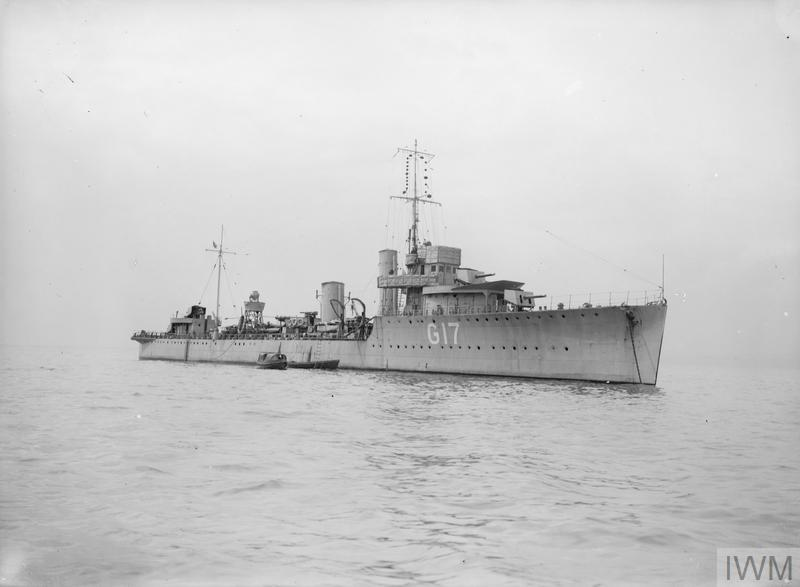
- HMS Walrus during the First World War

History

United Kingdom
- Name: HMS Walrus
- Namesake: The walrus
- Ordered: December 1916
- Builder: Fairfield Shipbuilding and Engineering Company, Govan
- Laid down: February 1917
- Launched: 27 December 1917
- Completed: 1918
- Commissioned: 8 March 1918
- Decommissioned: 30 November 1932
- Fate: Wrecked 12 February 1938; Sold 5 March 1938 for scrapping; Scrapped October 1938

General characteristics
- Displacement: 1,100 tons
- Length: 300 ft (91 m) o/a, 312 ft (95 m)p/p
- Beam: 26.75 ft (8.15 m)
- Draught: 9 ft (2.7 m) standard, 11.25 ft (3.43 m) in deep
- Propulsion: 3 Yarrow type Water-tube boilers; Brown-Curtis steam turbines; 2 shafts; 27,000 shp (20,000 kW)
- Speed: 34 knots (63 km/h; 39 mph)
- Range: 320-370 tons oil, 3,500 nmi (6,500 km) at 15 knots (28 km/h; 17 mph), 900 nmi (1,700 km) at 32 knots (59 km/h; 37 mph)
- Complement: 110
- Armament: 4 × QF 4 in Mk.V (102mm L/45), mount P Mk.I; 2 × QF 2 pdr Mk.II "pom-pom" (40 mm L/39) or; 1 × QF 3 inch 20 cwt (76 mm), mount HA Mk.II; 6 (2x3) tubes for 21 in torpedoes

The first HMS Walrus (D24) was a W-class destroyer of the British Royal Navy that saw service in the final months of World War I.

== Construction and commissioning ==
Walrus was ordered in December 1916 and was laid down by the Fairfield Shipbuilding and Engineering Company at Govan, Scotland, in February 1917. She was launched on 27 December 1917 and commissioned on 8 March 1918. She was assigned the pennant number G17 in April 1918, but it was changed to D24 during the interwar period.

== Service history ==
All of the V- and W-class destroyers, Walrus among them, were assigned to the Grand Fleet or Harwich Force for the rest of World War I, which ended with the armistice with Germany on 11 November 1918.

Walrus was assigned to the Atlantic Fleet in 1921 as part of the 5th Destroyer Flotilla, which also included the destroyer leader Malcolm and destroyers Vanity, Vendetta, Vivacious, Voyager, Waterhen, Wrestler, and Wryneck.

On 6 June 1924, Walrus was recommissioned at Devonport for service in the Mediterranean Fleet along with the rest of the 5th Destroyer Flotilla, which in 1925 was redesignated the 1st Destroyer Flotilla. She entered dockyard hands at Sheerness in England on 15 November 1926 for a refit, and recommissioned on 5 April 1927 to resume duty with the 1st Destroyer Flotilla in the Mediterranean. She re-commissioned at Devonport on 11 June 1929 for continued service with the 1st Destroyer Flotilla in the Mediterranean.

Walrus was recommissioned in reserve on 30 November 1932 and transferred to the Reserve Fleet, and placed in reserve at Devonport. In 1934 she was moved to Rosyth, Scotland, where she remained in reserve.

== Loss ==
The Royal Navy decided to convert Walrus into an antiaircraft escort, and in February 1938 a tug took her under tow from Rosyth with a skeleton crew of four men aboard bound for Chatham Dockyard, where she was to undergo the conversion. During the voyage, however, a powerful storm struck the North Sea, and on 12 February 1938 her towline broke in high winds and heavy seas and she was driven ashore on the Mascus Rocks in North Bay off Scarborough, England. The four men aboard Walrus made it to shore safely in one of her boats.

== Final disposition ==
Deemed beyond economical repair, Walrus was sold to Round Brothers of Sunderland, England, on 5 March 1938 for scrapping. She was refloated on 29 March 1938 and scrapped in October 1938.

== Bibliography ==
- Campbell, John (1985). Naval Weapons of World War II. Annapolis, Maryland: Naval Institute Press. ISBN 0-87021-459-4.
- Chesneau, Roger, ed. (1980). Conway's All the World's Fighting Ships 1922–1946. Greenwich, UK: Conway Maritime Press. ISBN 0-85177-146-7.
- Colledge, J. J.; Warlow, Ben (2006) [1969]. Ships of the Royal Navy: The Complete Record of All Fighting Ships of the Royal Navy from the 15th Century to the Present (3rd Rev ed.). London: Chatham Publishing. ISBN 978-1-86176-281-8. OCLC 67375475.
- Cocker, Maurice. Destroyers of the Royal Navy, 1893–1981. Ian Allan. ISBN 0-7110-1075-7.
- Friedman, Norman (2009). British Destroyers From Earliest Days to the Second World War. Annapolis, Maryland: Naval Institute Press. ISBN 978-1-59114-081-8.
- Gardiner, Robert & Gray, Randal, eds. (1985). Conway's All the World's Fighting Ships 1906–1921. Annapolis, Maryland: Naval Institute Press. ISBN 0-85177-245-5.
- Lenton, H. T. (1998). British & Empire Warships of the Second World War. Annapolis, Maryland: Naval Institute Press. ISBN 1-55750-048-7.
- March, Edgar J. (1966). British Destroyers: A History of Development, 1892–1953; Drawn by Admiralty Permission From Official Records & Returns, Ships' Covers & Building Plans. London: Seeley Service. OCLC 164893555.
- Preston, Antony (1971). 'V & W' Class Destroyers 1917–1945. London: Macdonald. OCLC 464542895.
- Raven, Alan & Roberts, John (1979). 'V' and 'W' Class Destroyers. Man o'War. Vol. 2. London: Arms & Armour. ISBN 0-85368-233-X.
- Rohwer, Jürgen (2005). Chronology of the War at Sea 1939–1945: The Naval History of World War Two (Third Revised ed.). Annapolis, Maryland: Naval Institute Press. ISBN 1-59114-119-2.
- Whinney, Bob (2000). The U-boat Peril: A Fight for Survival. Cassell. ISBN 0-304-35132-6.
- Whitley, M. J. (1988). Destroyers of World War 2. Annapolis, Maryland: Naval Institute Press. ISBN 0-87021-326-1.
- Winser, John de D. (1999). B.E.F. Ships Before, At and After Dunkirk. Gravesend, Kent: World Ship Society. ISBN 0-905617-91-6.
