= HMS Witch =

Destroyer of the Royal Navy

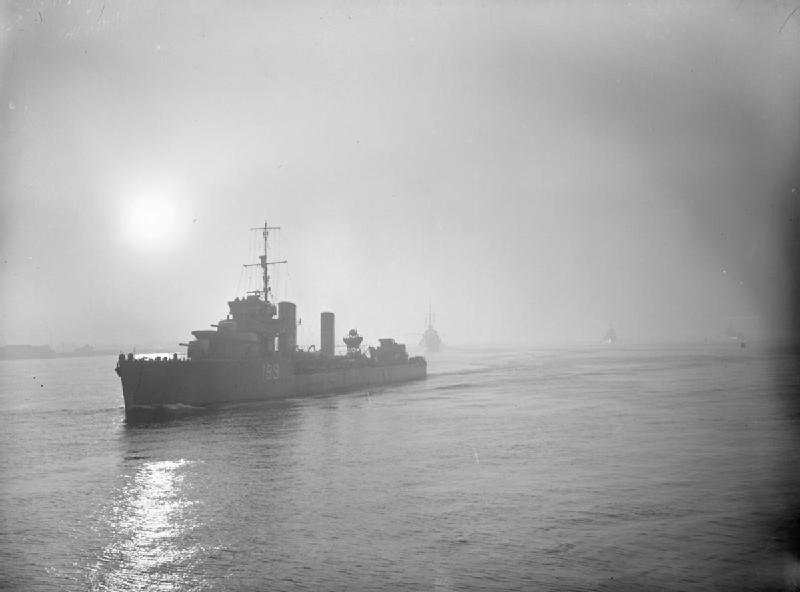
- At dawn off Plymouth, England, HMS Witch (foreground) leads other destroyers during World War II.

History

United Kingdom
- Name: HMS Witch
- Ordered: January 1918
- Builder: John I. Thornycroft & Company, Woolston, Hampshire, Hampshire; Devonport Dockyard, Devonport, Devon
- Laid down: 13 June 1918
- Launched: 11 November 1919
- Completed: March 1924
- Commissioned: March 1924
- Decommissioned: 1920s
- Recommissioned: 1939
- Decommissioned: soon after 15 August 1945
- Motto: I'll do and I'll do
- Honours and awards: Battle honours for: Atlantic 1940-1943; Norway 1940; North Sea 1944
- Fate: Sold for scrapping 12 July 1946
- Badge: A black cat affronte cantant before a silver crescent moon on a blue field

General characteristics
- Displacement: 1,140 tons standard, 1,550 tons full
- Length: 300 ft o/a, 312 ft p/p
- Beam: 30 ft
- Draught: 10 ft 11 in
- Propulsion: 3 Yarrow type Water-tube boilers, Brown-Curtis steam turbines, 2 shafts, 27,000 shp
- Speed: 34 kt; Reduced to 25 kt 1943
- Range: 320-370 tons oil; 3,500 nmi at 15 kt; 900 nmi at 32 kt
- Complement: 134
- Sensors & processing systems: Type 271 surface warning radar fitted 1942
- Armament: 4 × BL 4.7 in (120-mm) Mk.I guns mount P Mk.I; 2 × QF 2 pdr Mk.II "pom-pom" (40 mm L/39); 6 × 21-inch Torpedo Tubes
- Notes: Pennant number D89

HMS Witch (D89) was a Modified W-class destroyer of the British Royal Navy that saw service in World War II.

== Construction and commissioning ==
Witch, the first Royal Navy ship of the name, was ordered in January 1918 as part of the 13th Order of the 1918–1919 Naval Programme, and was laid down on 13 June 1918 by John I. Thornycroft & Company at Woolston, Hampshire. The pace of her construction slowed greatly after the Armistice with Germany brought World War I to an end on 11 November 1918, and she was not launched until 11 November 1919. She then was towed to Devonport Dockyard at Devonport, Devon, where her fitting-out took place slowly, and she was not completed until March 1924.

== Service history ==
=== Interwar ===
Upon completion, Witch was commissioned in March 1924. She saw little service and soon was decommissioned and placed in reserve at Rosyth, Scotland.

In 1939, Witch was recommissioned for the Royal Review of the Reserve Fleet by King George VI.

=== World War II ===
==== 1939−1940 ====
Witch remained in commission after the United Kingdom entered World War II in September 1939, and on 3 September 1939 she was assigned to the 15th Destroyer Flotilla at Rosyth for the defence of convoys in the North Sea steaming along the east coast of Great Britain. In October 1939 she was transferred to the Western Approaches Command for convoy escort duty in the Western Approaches and North Atlantic Ocean. gala On 11 January 1940, Witch and the destroyers Wanderer and Warwick reinforced the escort of the Gibraltar-to-Liverpool-bound Convoy HG 14F, which previously had consisted only of the sloops Aberdeen, Bideford, and Leith, while it transited the Southwestern Approaches, staying with the convoy until it arrived at Liverpool on 13 January 1940. On 7 March 1940 she and the destroyer Whirlwind relieved the escort of Convoy HG 21F in the Southwestern Approaches during the final leg of its voyage from Gibraltar to Liverpool, where it arrived on 10 March 1940. On 19 March 1940, Witch and the destroyers Vortigern and Watchman relieved the destroyer Vanquisher of escorting Convoy HG 22F on the final segment of its Gibraltar-to-Liverpool voyage, returning to base at Liverpool after detaching from the convoy on 21 March 1940.

On 8 April 1940, Witch, the destroyers Vimy and Viscount, and the sloop Rochester joined Convoy HG 25F to escort it on the final leg of its voyage from Gibraltar to Liverpool, but the following day Witch and Vimy were detached from the convoy with orders to proceed to Scapa Flow in the Orkney Islands for service with the Home Fleet in Operation Rupert, escorting convoys carrying Allied troops to Norway to oppose the German invasion of the country. On 22 April 1940, Witch joined the light cruisers Galatea, Glasgow, and Sheffield, and the destroyers Campbell, Icarus, Impulsive, Ivanhoe, and Vansittart in Operation Sickle, in which the ships transported troops from Rosyth to Molde, Norway, to reinforce Allied forces at Andalsnes, with each destroyer carrying 60 troops; the ships arrived at Molde on 23 April 1940. On 11 May 1940, Witch joined the light cruisers Calcutta and Coventry and the destroyers Campbell, Isis, and Zulu in escorting the damaged light cruiser Penelope to Greenock, Scotland. Witch soon was released from operations related to the Norwegian campaign and rejoined the 15th Destroyer Flotilla at Rosyth, returning to convoy escort operations in the North Sea along the east coast of Great Britain and patrol duties in the North Sea.

==== 1941 ====
In August 1941, Witch was transferred to the 10th Destroyer Flotilla for convoy escort duties in the Western Approaches. On 5 August 1941, she and the light cruiser Cairo, the destroyers Whitehall and Winchester, the Royal Netherlands Navy destroyer HNLMS Isaac Sweers, and the Polish Navy destroyer ORP Piorun deployed as local escort for the military Convoy WS 10 during the first leg of its voyage from the United Kingdom to Freetown in Sierra Leone; the ships detached from the convoy on 7 August 1941 and returned to the River Clyde. On 9 August 1941, Witch joined the escort of Convoy WS 8C, a military convoy which steamed from the Clyde to Scapa Flow as part of the build-up for a planned occupation of the Azores which later was cancelled; she returned to the Clyde on 10 August 1941. From 15 to 17 August 1941 Witch, Whitehall, and the Royal Netherlands Navy light cruiser HNLMS Jacob van Heemskerck escorted Convoy WS 10X from Liverpool to the Clyde.

From 17 to 26 September 1941, Witch, Whitehall, Issac Sweers, Piorun, the destroyers Blankney, Laforey, Lightning, and Oribi, and the Polish Navy destroyer ORP Garland escorted Convoy WS 11X from the Clyde to Gibraltar in one of the preliminary moves of Operation Halberd, an effort to steam a resupply convoy through the Mediterranean Sea to Malta. After the convoy arrived at Gibraltar on 26 September, Witch steamed back to the United Kingdom.

Witch repeated this pattern as 1941 wore on. From 1 to 4 October 1941 she formed part of the local escort of Convoy WS 12 during its passage through the Western Approaches along with Cairo, Blankney, Whitehall, the destroyers Badsworth, Bradford, Brighton, Lancaster, Newark, Stanley, and Verity, and the Royal Canadian Navy destroyers Assiniboine and Saguenay, returning to the Clyde with those ships after detaching from the convoy. From 13 to 16 November 1941, Witch, Badsworth, Verity, Whitehall, and the destroyers Exmoor, Maori, and Vanquisher were the local escort for Convoy WS 12Z as it transited the Western Approaches, the ships returning to the Clyde after detaching from the convoy. From 13 to 15 December 1941, Witch, Badsworth, Vanquisher and the destroyers Beaufort and Volunteer provided the local escort for Convoy WS 14 in the Western Approaches, as usual returning to the Clyde upon completion of this duty.

==== 1942–1945 ====
Witch continued her convoy escort duties in the North Atlantic into 1942 and was "adopted" by the civil community of Northwich, Cheshire, in March 1942 as a result of a Warship Week National Savings campaign. In 1942, she underwent conversion into a short-range escort. Upon completion of this conversion and post-conversion trials and work-ups, she returned to convoy escort duty in September 1942 as part of the escort of Convoy ON 127. She continued North Atlantic convoy work until December 1942, when she deployed as part of the 5th Escort Group to the Caribbean for convoy duty. In January 1943, she escorted the tanker convoy Convoy TM 1 from the West Indies to Gibraltar; the convoy came under attack by German submarines during its voyage.

In early February 1943, Witch was part of the escort of Convoy ON 168 from the United Kingdom to Halifax, Nova Scotia, Canada. She then deployed with the 2nd Escort Group to oppose the German Pfeil ("Arrow") submarine group, which was threatening Convoy SC 118 on its voyage from North America to the Clyde, and on 4 February 1943 Witch, Vimy, the destroyers Beverley and Vanessa, the corvettes Abelia and Mignonette, and the Free French Naval Forces corvette FFL Lobelia conducted antisubmarine warfare operations targeting the Pfeil group. The following day, Witch joined the escort of SC 118, remaining with the convoy until detaching to refuel, after which she returned to her duties with the 2nd Escort Group.

Later in February 1943, the Royal Navy selected Witch for transfer to Freetown, Sierra Leone, for service with local escort forces there. Accordingly, she and the destroyer leader Malcolm, and the destroyers Quadrant and Wolverine escorted Convoy WS 28 from 16 to 27 March 1943 during its voyage from the United Kingdom to Freetown, detaching on the latter date when the convoy arrived there and remaining there in her new role. In April 1943, she and Wolverine rescued 53 survivors of the British merchant ship Empire Whimbrel, which the German submarine U-181 had sunk on 11 April 1943 420 nautical miles (778 km) southwest of Freetown at position 02°31′00″N 015°55′00″W. From 26 to 28 April 1943, she joined Malcolm and Wolverine in serving as local escort for Convoy WS 29 during the final leg of its voyage to Freetown. Witch, Malcolm, Wolverine, and the destroyers Boreas and Rapid departed Freetown on 6 May 1943 as local escort for Convoy WS 29, detaching on 8 May 1943 to return to Freetown, and on 3 June 1943 Witch, Rapid, Wolverine, and the destroyer Boadicea departed Freetown as the local escort for Convoy WS 30, remaining with it until 9 June 1943, when Quadrant, the destroyer Redoubt, and the Royal Australian Navy destroyer Norman relieved them and they detached to return to Freetown. From 10 to 12 July 1943, Witch and the corvette Armeria escorted Convoy WS 31 during a leg of its voyage from Freetown to the Cape of Good Hope, detaching to return to Freetown when relieved by Rapid.

Witch continued her duties at Freetown through December 1943, when she was selected for transfer to convoy escort duties in the North Sea. During the early months of 1944, she steamed back to the United Kingdom, and by May 1944 she had begun operations in the North Sea, which she continued – taking no part in operations related to the Allied invasion of Normandy during the summer of 1944 – until the surrender of Germany in early May 1945. After that, she served on local port duties and in support of reoccupation forces during the summer of 1945.

== Decommissioning and disposal ==
Selected for reduction to reserve status during the summer of 1945, Witch was decommissioned and placed in reserve after the 15 August 1945 armistice with Japan. She was sold to BISCO on 12 July 1946 for scrapping by G. Brunton, and later was scrapped in Scotland at Granton on the River Forth.

== Bibliography ==
- Campbell, John (1985). Naval Weapons of World War II. Annapolis, Maryland: Naval Institute Press. ISBN 0-87021-459-4.
- Chesneau, Roger, ed. (1980). Conway's All the World's Fighting Ships 1922–1946. Greenwich, UK: Conway Maritime Press. ISBN 0-85177-146-7.
- Colledge, J. J.; Warlow, Ben (2006) [1969]. Ships of the Royal Navy: The Complete Record of All Fighting Ships of the Royal Navy from the 15th Century to the Present (3rd Rev ed.). London: Chatham Publishing. ISBN 978-1-86176-281-8. OCLC 67375475.
- Cocker, Maurice. Destroyers of the Royal Navy, 1893–1981. Ian Allan. ISBN 0-7110-1075-7.
- Friedman, Norman (2009). British Destroyers From Earliest Days to the Second World War. Annapolis, Maryland: Naval Institute Press. ISBN 978-1-59114-081-8.
- Gardiner, Robert & Gray, Randal, eds. (1985). Conway's All the World's Fighting Ships 1906–1921. Annapolis, Maryland: Naval Institute Press. ISBN 0-85177-245-5.
- Lenton, H. T. (1998). British & Empire Warships of the Second World War. Annapolis, Maryland: Naval Institute Press. ISBN 1-55750-048-7.
- March, Edgar J. (1966). British Destroyers: A History of Development, 1892–1953; Drawn by Admiralty Permission From Official Records & Returns, Ships' Covers & Building Plans. London: Seeley Service. OCLC 164893555.
- Preston, Antony (1971). 'V & W' Class Destroyers 1917–1945. London: Macdonald. OCLC 464542895.
- Raven, Alan & Roberts, John (1979). 'V' and 'W' Class Destroyers. Man o'War. Vol. 2. London: Arms & Armour. ISBN 0-85368-233-X.
- Rohwer, Jürgen (2005). Chronology of the War at Sea 1939–1945: The Naval History of World War Two (Third Revised ed.). Annapolis, Maryland: Naval Institute Press. ISBN 1-59114-119-2.
- Whinney, Bob (2000). The U-boat Peril: A Fight for Survival. Cassell. ISBN 0-304-35132-6.
- Whitley, M. J. (1988). Destroyers of World War 2. Annapolis, Maryland: Naval Institute Press. ISBN 0-87021-326-1.
- Winser, John de D. (1999). B.E.F. Ships Before, At and After Dunkirk. Gravesend, Kent: World Ship Society. ISBN 0-905617-91-6.

== Notes ==
- HMS WITCH (D 89) - V & W-class Destroyer
- uboat.net HMS Witch (D 89)
