= V and W-class destroyer =

Class of Royal Navy destroyers built late in World War I

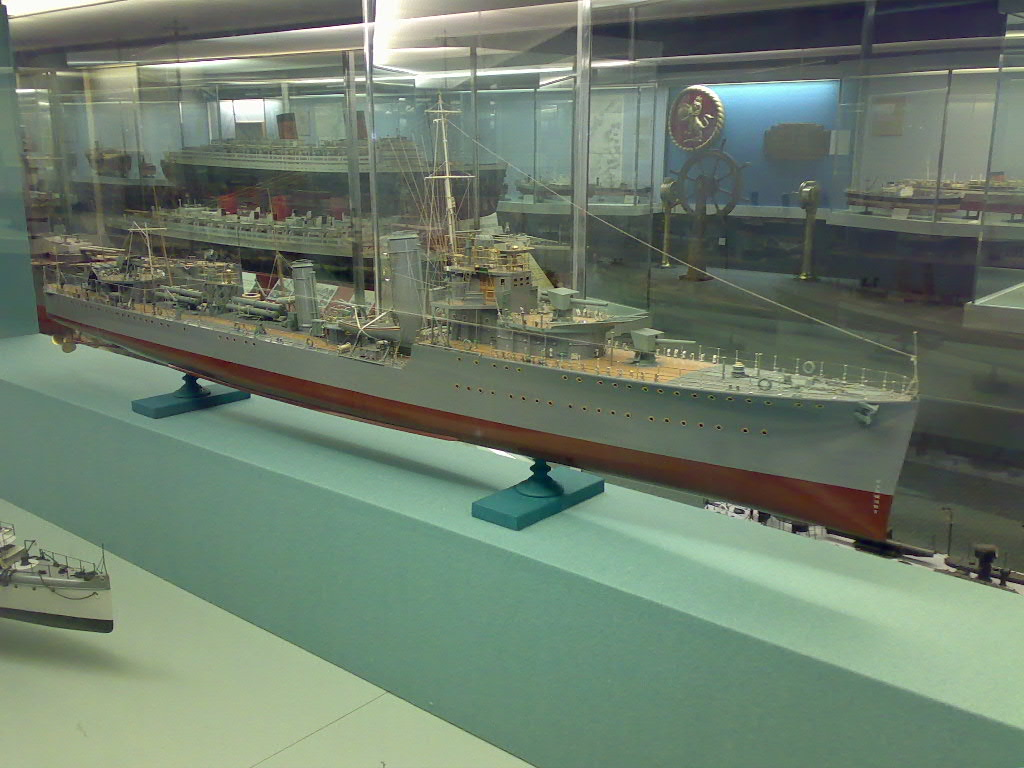
- Model of HMS Veteran, an Admiralty modified W ship, in the Glasgow Museum of Transport

Class overview
- Name: V and W
- Operators: Royal Navy; Royal Australian Navy
- Preceded by: S class; Parker class
- Succeeded by: Thornycroft type destroyer leader; Ambuscade; Amazon
- Subclasses: Admiralty V-class leader; Admiralty V class; Admiralty W class; Thornycroft V and W class; Thornycroft modified W class; Admiralty modified W class
- Built: 1916–1924
- In service: 1917–1945
- Planned: 107
- Completed: 67
- Cancelled: 40

General characteristics (see below)
- Type: Destroyer

The V and W class was an amalgam of six similar classes of destroyer built for the Royal Navy under the 9th, 10th, 13th and 14th of fourteen War Emergency Programmes during the First World War and generally treated as one class. For their time they were among the most powerful and advanced ships of their type in the world, and set the trend for future British designs.

They arrived in time to see service in the First World War. During the interwar period these ships formed the backbone of the Royal Navy's destroyer flotillas until gradually replaced by new construction; by the mid-1930s most had been displaced to the reserve fleet. Most ships survived to make an extensive contribution to the Second World War effort, in the vital role of convoy escort, freeing up more modern ships for fleet action.

== History ==
HMS Vidette (Admiralty V class), showing the typical inter-war layout of a V and W-class destroyer. She is wearing the 1939-pattern funnel bands of the 16th Destroyer Flotilla based at Portsmouth; one red over one white.

The V and W class were the ultimate evolution of British destroyer design in the First World War, embodying the improvements of their predecessors as well as new technological advances. Their lineage can be traced to the River or E class of 1902 that had introduced the classic raised forecastle into the Royal Navy. The Tribal class of 1905 introduced oil-firing and the resultant economies in size, consumption and crew. The Parker-class flotilla leader of 1915 had introduced a raised shelter deck forwards, allowing two guns to be carried in the classic superfiring (i.e. one gun fires over the top of the one below and in front of it) "A" and "B" positions. The Yarrow Later M class, also of 1915, introduced a three-boiler, two-funnel layout allowing for a more compact hull and giving increased deckspace and the R class introduced geared turbines giving 30,000 shaft horsepower (22,000 kW) on two shafts.

== Design ==
The new design, originally known as the Admiralty V-class leader, incorporated all these improvements, and also a more sensible layout of the main armament, the amidships gun between the funnels being removed to the aft shelter deck, superfiring over the gun on the quarterdeck. This introduced the ubiquitous "A", "B", "X", "Y" layout for the main armament. New developments, such as director firing for the main armament, triple torpedo tubes and a heavier armament were introduced either from the outset, or as they became available. Ships with triple tubes became the Admiralty W class and those with their armament upgraded to the BL 4.7 in gun became Admiralty Modified W-class ships.

== Admiralty V-class leaders ==
General characteristics (as built)
- Displacement: 1,188 long tons (1,207 t)
- Length: 312 ft (95.1 m) (o/a)
- Beam: 29 ft 6 in (9.0 m)
- Draught: 11 ft 9 in (3.6 m) deep
- Installed power: 27,000 shp (20,134 kW); 3 × Water-tube boilers
- Propulsion: 2 × shafts, 2 × steam turbines
- Speed: 34 knots (63 km/h; 39 mph)
- Range: 3,500 nmi (6,500 km; 4,000 mi) at 15 knots (28 km/h; 17 mph)
- Complement: 134
- Armament: 4 × single QF 4 in (102 mm) Mk V guns; 1 × single QF 3-inch (76 mm) 20 cwt (Note: "Cwt" is the abbreviation for hundredweight, 20 cwt referring to the weight of the gun.) anti-aircraft gun; 2 × twin 21-inch (533 mm) torpedo tubes

The Admiralty V-class leaders were the initial five V-class ships ordered in April 1916 and were designed and built as flotilla leaders. These ships were necessary as the 36 knot speed of the new S class meant that existing flotilla leaders would no longer be able to keep pace with their charges. To speed construction time, these new vessels were based on the three-boiler, two-funnel machinery of the R class and as they were inevitably larger, a slight decrease in speed was accepted. The fore funnel was tall and narrow and the after one was shorter and wider.

They differed from the later Admiralty and the Thornycroft V classes in that they had a larger bridge structure, taller foremast, mainmast mounted further aft to accommodate an enlarged spread of wireless aerials, extra boats abreast the after funnel and the searchlight platform between the torpedo tubes was enlarged to accommodate an extra compass. Vampire trialled triple mounts for her torpedoes and as a result had a total of six tubes.

=== Ships ===
- HMS Valentine – built by Cammell Laird & Co, Birkenhead, laid down 8 August 1916, launched 24 March 1917, completed 27 June 1917, damaged by German aircraft, beached and abandoned off Terneuzen 15 May 1940, salvaged 1953 and broken up.
- HMS Valhalla – built by Cammell Laird, laid down 8 August 1916, launched 22 May 1917, completed 31 July 1917, sold for breaking up 17 December 1931.
- HMS Valkyrie – built by William Denny and Brothers, Dumbarton, laid down 25 May 1916, launched 12 March 1917, completed 16 June 1917, sold for breaking up 24 August 1936.
- Valorous – built by Denny, laid down 25 May 1916, launched 5 August 1917, completed 21 August 1917, sold for breaking up 4 March 1947.
- HMS Vampire – built by J. Samuel White & Co, Cowes, laid down 10 October 1916, launched 21 May 1917, completed 22 September 1917, transferred to Royal Australian Navy in October 1933, bombed and sunk by Japanese aircraft in the Bay of Bengal 9 April 1942.

== Admiralty V class ==
General characteristics (as built, where different)
- Displacement: 1,090 long tons (1,110 t)
- Armament: 4 × single QF 4-inch Mk V guns; 1 × single QF 3-inch 20 cwt or 1 × QF 2 pdr (40 mm) Mk II "pom-pom" anti-aircraft gun; 2 × twin 21-inch torpedo tubes

The 23 vessels comprising the Admiralty V class were ordered in July 1916 under the 9th War Programme as repeats of the Admiralty V-class leaders (ordered three months earlier) to counter the threat posed by reports of a new class of powerful German destroyers (see SMS S113). They omitted the flotilla leader function and as such differed in detail from the leader predecessor.

While all 23 ships were completed with two twin torpedo tubes (Voyager, which was completed with triple tubes, was an Admiralty W-class unit ordered in December 1916), in 1921 all Admiralty V class had their forward bank replaced by a triple bank, for a total of five torpedoes; and from 1923 onwards most ships had their aft bank (twin tubes) replaced by a triple bank, for a total of six torpedoes, except in Vimy, Vanoc, Velox, Versatile and Vortigern in which only the forward bank was replaced.

Vanquisher, Vanoc, Velox, Vehement, Venturous, Versatile, Vimiera, Vittoria and Vortigern were built with the ability to be converted into minelayers within 24 hours. For this purpose they would land their torpedo tubes and "Y" gun on the quarterdeck and have screens fitted to protect the mines, of which up to sixty could be carried. They could be distinguished by the permanent mine chutes at the stern.

=== Ships ===
- Vancouver – built by William Beardmore and Company, Dalmuir, laid down 15 March 1917, launched 28 December 1917, completed 9 March 1918. Renamed HMS Vimy on 1 April 1928 to release the name Vancouver for another destroyer acquired by the Royal Canadian Navy. Sold for breaking up 4 March 1947.
- Vanessa – built by Beardmore, laid down 16 May 1917, launched 16 March 1918, completed 27 April 1918. Given pennant number G18. Sold for breaking up 4 March 1947.
- Vanity – built by Beardmore, laid down 28 July 1917, launched 3 May 1918, completed 21 June 1918, sold for breaking up 4 March 1947.
- Vanoc – built by John Brown & Company, Clydebank, laid down 20 September 1916, launched 14 June 1917, completed 15 August 1917, sold for breaking up 26 July 1945, wrecked off Penryn en route to breakers in June 1946, later salved and scrapped at Falmouth.
- Vanquisher – built by John Brown, laid down 27 September 1916, launched 18 August 1917, completed 2 October 1917. Given pennant number D54, sold for breaking up 4 March 1947.
- Vectis – built by J. Samuel White & Company, Cowes, laid down 7 December 1916, launched 4 September 1917, completed 5 December 1917, sold for breaking up 25 August 1936.
- Vega – built by William Doxford & Sons Ltd, Pallion, laid down 11 December 1916, launched 1 September 1917, completed 14 December 1917, sold for breaking up 4 March 1947.
- Vehement – built by William Denny and Brothers, Dumbarton, laid down 25 September 1916, launched 6 July 1917, completed 1917, mined and sunk in North Sea 1 August 1918.
- Velox – built by Doxford, laid down January 1917, launched 17 November 1917, completed 1 April 1918, sold for breaking up 18 February 1947.
- Vendetta – built by Fairfield Shipbuilding and Engineering Company, Govan, laid down November 1916, launched 3 September 1917, completed 17 October 1917, transferred to Royal Australian Navy October 1933, scuttled off Sydney 2 July 1948.
- Venetia – built by Fairfield, laid down 2 February 1917, launched 29 October 1917, completed 19 December 1917, mined and sunk in Thames estuary 19 October 1940.
- Venturous – built by Denny, laid down 9 October 1916, launched 21 September 1917, completed 29 November 1917, sold for breaking up 24 August 1936.
- Verdun – built by R. & W. Hawthorn, Leslie and Company, Hebburn, laid down 13 January 1917, launched 21 August 1917, completed 3 November 1917, sold for breaking up March 1946.
- Versatile – built by Hawthorn Leslie, laid down 31 January 1917, launched 21 August 1917, completed 3 November 1917, sold for scrapping 1946
- Verulam – built by Hawthorn Leslie, laid down 1917, launched 3 October 1917, mined and sunk off Seiskari in Gulf of Finland on night of 3/4 September 1919.
- Vesper – built by Alexander Stephen and Sons, Linthouse, laid down 7 December 1916, launched 15 December 1917, completed 20 February 1918, sold for breaking up 4 March 1947.
- Vidette – built by Alexander Stephen, laid down 1 February 1917, launched 28 February 1918, completed 27 April 1918, sold for breaking up 4 March 1947.
- Vimiera – built by Swan, Hunter & Wigham Richardson, Wallsend, laid down October 1916, launched 22 June 1917, completed 19 September 1917, mined and sunk in Thames estuary 9 January 1942.
- Violent – built by Swan Hunter, launched 1 September 1917, sold for breaking up 8 March 1937.
- Vittoria – built by Swan Hunter, 29 October 1917, torpedoed and sunk by Bolshevik submarine Pantera off Seiskari in the Gulf of Finland 1 September 1919.
- Vivacious – built by Yarrow & Company, laid down July 1916, launched 13 November 1917, completed 29 December 1917, sold for breaking up 4 March 1947.
- HMS Vivien – built by Yarrow, laid down July 1916, launched 16 February 1918, completed 28 May 1918, sold for breaking up 18 February 1947.
- Vortigern – built by White, laid down 17 January 1917, launched 15 October 1917, completed 25 January 1918, torpedoed and sunk by German E-boat off Cromer 15 March 1942.

== Admiralty W class ==
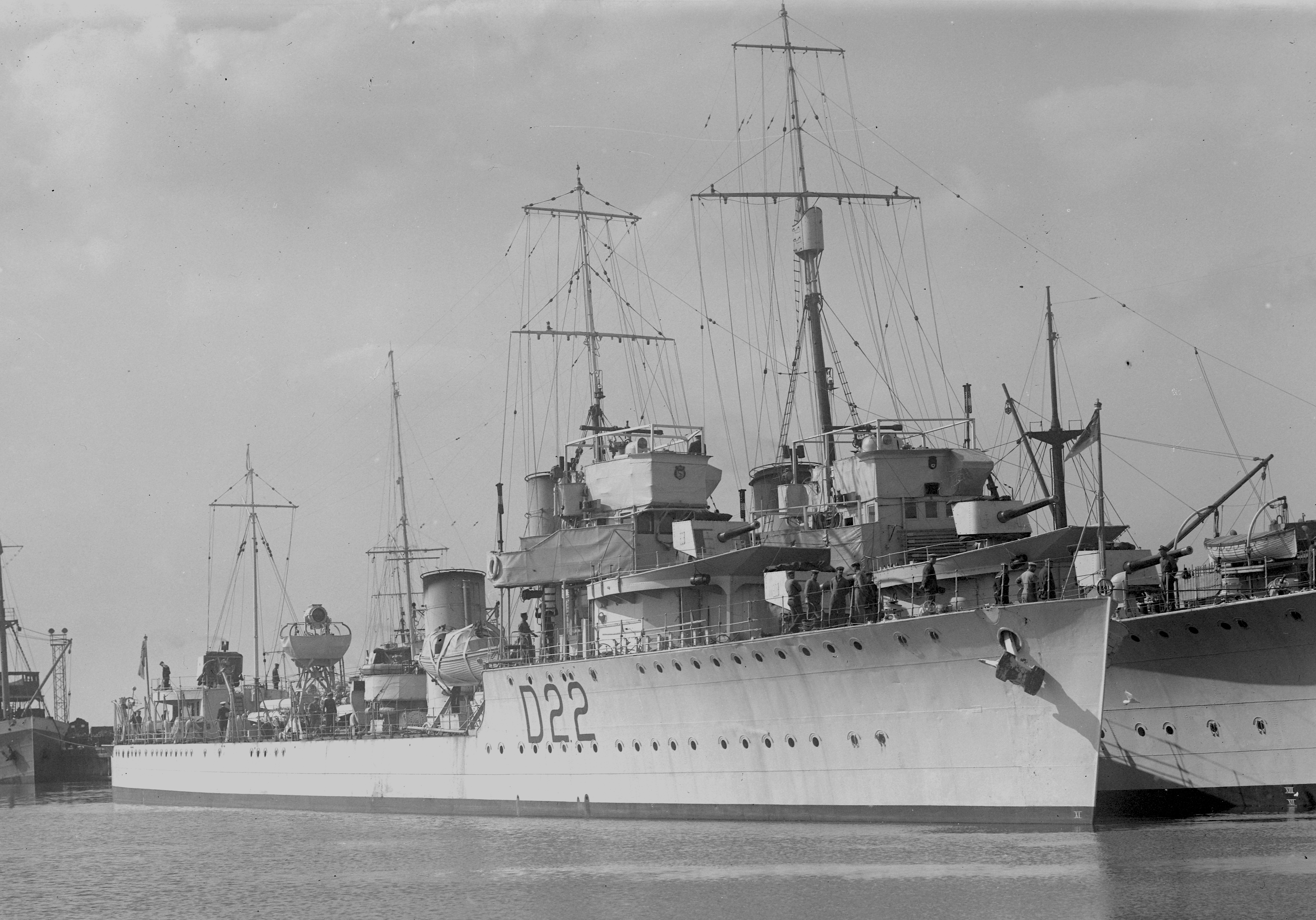
- HMAS Waterhen (D22)

General characteristics (Admiralty W class)
- Displacement: 1,100 tons
- Draught: 9 ft standard, 11 ft 3 in deep
- Propulsion: 3 Yarrow type Water-tube boilers (White-Forster type in Winchelsea, Winchester), Brown-Curtis steam turbines (Parsons in Waterhen, Wrestler, Wryneck), 2 shafts, 27,000 shp
- Complement: 110
- Armament: 4 × QF 4 in Mk.V (102mm L/45) guns; 2 × QF 2 pdr Mk.II "pom-pom" (40 mm L/39) anti-aircraft guns or; 1 × QF 3-inch 20 cwt anti-aircraft gun; 6 (2x3) tubes for 21-inch (530 mm) torpedoes
- Notes: Other characteristics as per Admiralty V leader

The Admiralty W class comprised 21 vessels, all ordered in December 1916 under the 10th War Programme, although the two ships ordered from Yarrow were cancelled in April 1917 and replaced by the orders for two Yarrow S class (Tomahawk and Torch). The Admiralty W-class ships were a follow on from the Admiralty V class, with minimal changes, primarily in that the triple torpedo tube mounting was now ready and all these vessels shipped two of these mountings from new. They also had a taller mainmast.

=== Ships ===
- Voyager – built by Alexander Stephen and Sons, Linthouse, laid down 17 May 1917, launched 8 May 1918, completed 24 June 1918, transferred to Royal Australian Navy in October 1933, bombed by Japanese aircraft and beached on Timor, 23 September 1942.
- Wakeful – built by John Brown & Company, Clydebank, laid down 17 January 1917, launched 6 October 1917, completed 16 November 1917, torpedoed and sunk by German E-boat S30 off Nieuwpoort 29 May 1940.
- Walker – built by William Denny and Brothers, Dumbarton, laid down 26 March 1917, launched 29 November 1917, completed 2 February 1918, sold for breaking up 15 March 1946.
- Walpole – built by William Doxford & Sons, Pallion, laid down May 1917, launched 12 February 1918, completed 7 August 1918, mined in North Sea 6 January 1945 and written off as constructive total loss, sold for breaking up 8 February 1945.
- Walrus – built by Fairfield Shipbuilding and Engineering Company, Govan, laid down 1917, launched 27 December 1917, completed 8 March 1918, stranded in Scarborough North Bay 12 February 1938 and written off as constructive total loss, sold for breaking up 5 March 1938.
- Warwick – built by R. & W. Hawthorn, Leslie and Company, Hebburn, laid down 10 March 1917, launched 28 December 1917, completed 18 March 1918, torpedoed and sunk by German submarine U-413 off Trevose Head 20 February 1944.
- Watchman – built by John Brown, laid down 17 January 1917, launched 2 November 1917, completed 26 January 1918, sold for breaking up 23 July 1945.
- Waterhen – built by Palmers Shipbuilding and Iron Company, Jarrow, laid down July 1917, launched 26 March 1918, completed 17 April 1918, transferred to Royal Australian Navy in October 1933, bombed and sunk off of Libya by German and Italian aircraft 30 June 1941.
- Wessex – built by Hawthorn Leslie, laid down 23 May 1917, launched 12 March 1918, completed 11 May 1918, bombed by German aircraft off Calais 24 May 1940.
- Westcott – built by Denny, laid down 30 March 1917, launched 14 February 1918, completed 12 March 1918, sold for breaking up 8 January 1946. Notable as first vessel to be fitted with the Hedgehog depth charge mortar in August 1941.
- Westminster – built by Scotts Shipbuilding and Engineering Company, Greenock, laid down April 1917, launched 25 February 1917, completed 18 April 1918, sold for breaking up 4 March 1947.
- Whirlwind – built by Swan Hunter & Wigham Richardson, Wallsend laid down May 1917, launched 15 December 1917, completed 15 March 1918, torpedoed by German submarine U-34 southwest of Ireland, 5 July 1940.
- Whitley (ex-Whitby) – built by Doxford, laid down June 1917, launched 13 April 1918, completed 14 October 1918, bombed by German aircraft and beached off Ostend 19 May 1940.
- Winchelsea – built by J. Samuel White, Cowes, laid down 25 May 1917, launched 15 December 1917, completed 15 March 1918, sold for breaking up 20 March 1945.
- Winchester – built by White, laid down 12 June 1917, launched 1 February 1918, completed 29 April 1918, sold for breaking up 5 March 1946.
- Windsor – built by Scotts, laid down April 1917, launched 21 June 1918, completed 28 August 1918, sold for breaking up 4 March 1947.
- Wolfhound – built by Fairfield, laid down April 1917, launched 14 March 1918, completed 27 April 1918, sold for breaking up 18 February 1948.
- Wrestler – built by Swan Hunter, laid down April 1917, launched 25 February 1918, completed 15 May 1918, mined off Juno Beach 6 June 1944 and written off as constructive total loss, sold for breaking up 20 July 1944.
- Wryneck – built by Palmers, laid down April 1917, launched 13 May 1918, completed 11 November 1918, bombed by German aircraft off Morea, Greece 27 April 1941.
- Wayfarer – ordered from Yarrow but not laid down, order cancelled April 1917.
- Woodpecker – ordered from Yarrow but not laid down, order cancelled April 1917.

== Thornycroft V and W class ==
General characteristics (Thornycroft V and W class)
- Displacement: 1,120 tons standard
- Beam: 30 ft 6 in
- Draught: 10 ft 6 in
- Propulsion: 3 Yarrow type Water-tube boilers, Brown-Curtis steam turbines, 2 shafts, 30,000 shp
- Complement: 134
- Armament: 4 × QF 4 in Mk.V (102mm L/45) guns; 1 × QF 3-inch 20 cwt anti-aircraft gun; 4/6 (2/3x2 – see text) tubes for 21-inch (530 mm) torpedoes
- Notes: Other characteristics as per Admiralty V leader

The Thornycroft V and W class were two V class and two W class specials built by John I. Thornycroft & Company to Admiralty specifications. They were ordered in pairs six months apart, on 30 July 1916 and 9 December 1916, respectively. They could be recognised by a higher freeboard and shorter mainmast than the Admiralty type and the flat-sided funnels typical of Thornycroft. The large boiler room (two units) was aft with the single unit forward, the fore funnel therefore being narrower. This arrangement was transposed in the Thornycroft Modified W class. The V-class ships had twin torpedo tubes and those of the W-class triple units. The second pair had slightly more displacement and a guaranteed (by contract) speed of 36 knots compared with the 35 knots guaranteed for the first pair. Early in their careers the specified anti-aircraft gun, the QF 2 pounder, was replaced by a single QF 12 pdr 20 cwt Mark I weapon, on a platform between the after funnel and the forward torpedo tubes.

All except Viscount, which became a long range escort, were modified to WAIR type fast anti-aircraft escorts. Their conversions were non-standard in that they carried a pair of QF 2 pdr Mark VIII guns on platforms amidships – en echelon in Woolston only – and that Viceroy retained a bank of torpedoes for some time.

=== Ships ===
- Viceroy, built by John I. Thornycroft & Company, Woolston, laid down 15 December 1916, launched 17 November 1917, completed 5 February 1918, sold for breaking up June 1948.
- Viscount, built by Thornycroft, laid down 20 December 1916, launched 29 December 1917, completed 25 March 1918, sold for breaking up 20 March 1945 but actually broken up in May 1947.
- Wolsey, built by Thornycroft, laid down 28 March 1917, launched 16 March 1918, completed 1 May 1918, sold for breaking up 4 March 1947.
- Woolston, built by Thornycroft, laid down 25 April 1917, launched 27 April 1918, completed 28 June 1918, sold for breaking up 18 February 1947.

== Thornycroft modified W class ==
General characteristics (Thornycroft modified W class)
- Displacement: 1,140 tons standard, 1,550 tons full
- Beam: 30 ft
- Draught: 10 ft 11 in
- Propulsion: 3 Thornycroft type Water-tube boilers, Brown-Curtis steam turbines, 2 shafts, 30,000 shp
- Speed: 32 kn
- Range: 320-370 tons oil, 3,500 nmi at 15 kn, 900 nmi at 32 kn
- Complement: 134
- Armament: 4 × BL 4.7 in (120mm) Mk.I L/45 guns, mount P Mk.I; 2 × QF 2 pdr Mk.II "pom-pom" (40 mm L/39) anti-aircraft guns; 6 (2x3) tubes for 21-inch (530 mm) torpedoes
- Notes: Other characteristics as per Admiralty V leader

The Thornycroft Modified W class were a private design by Thornycroft based on the Thornycroft V and W class to Admiralty specifications. These two ships were ordered in January 1918, at the same time as the first batch of Modified W class. In these two ships, the position of the boiler rooms was reversed, with the two-boiler room forward and the single unit aft. As a result, the funnel arrangements were transposed, with the thick funnel forwards and the narrow funnel aft. In common with other Thornycroft designs, they had characteristic broad, flat-sided funnels. Like the Admiralty modified ships, the Thornycrofts were up-gunned with the BL 4.7 inch Mark I weapon, and they received triple banks of torpedo tubes from the outset. Another feature of recognition was that the QF 2 pdr guns were mounted en echelon amidships, between the funnels.

The completion of Witch was delayed by the end of the war, and she was eventually towed to Devonport and completed there at HM Dockyard. Both were converted to the Short Range Escort type during World War II.

=== Ships ===
- Wishart – built by John I. Thornycroft & Company, Woolston, laid down 18 May 1918, launched 18 July 1919, completed June 1920, sold for breaking up 20 March 1945.
- Witch – built by Thornycroft, laid down 13 June 1918, launched 11 November 1919, completed March 1924, sold for breaking up July 1946.

== Admiralty modified W class ==
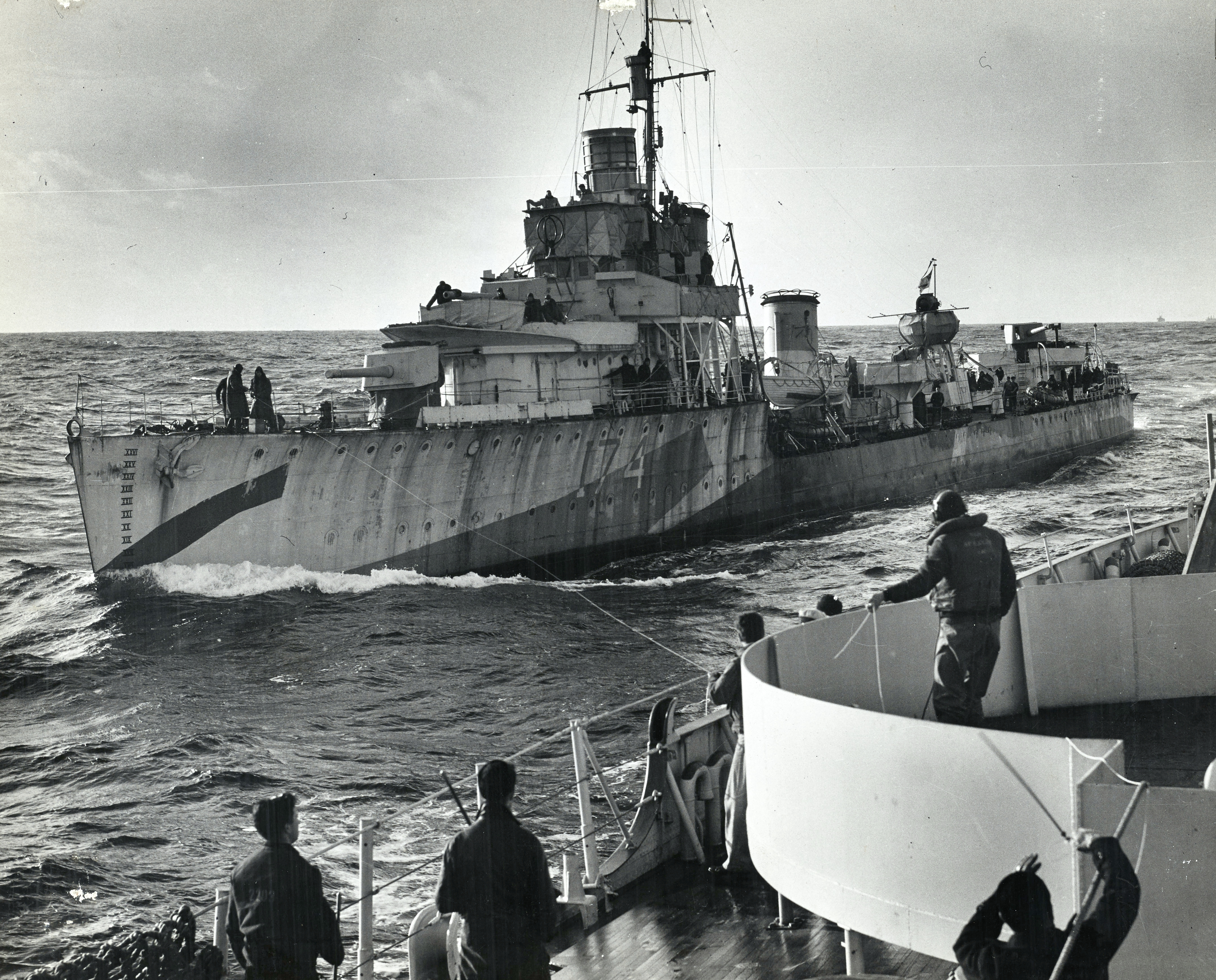
- HMS Wanderer (D74/I74) in 1942

General characteristics (Admiralty modified W class)
- Displacement: 1,140 tons standard, 1,550 tons full
- Beam: 30 ft
- Draught: 10 ft 11 in
- Propulsion: 3 Yarrow type Water-tube boilers, Brown-Curtis steam turbines, 2 shafts, 30,000 shp
- Speed: 32 kn
- Range: 320-370 tons oil, 3,500 nmi at 15 kn, 900 nmi at 32 kn
- Complement: 134
- Notes: Other characteristics as per Thornycroft modified W class

The two batches of orders placed in 1918 introduced the new BL 4.7 inch Mark I gun, as well as providing triple torpedo tubes as standard.

=== Ships ===
Fourteen vessels were ordered to this revised design in January 1918 under the 13th War Programme (as well as the two Thornycroft ships to a variant design), of which seven were subsequently cancelled.

- Vansittart – built by William Beardmore and Company, Dalmuir, laid down 1 July 1918, launched 17 April 1919, completed 5 November 1919, sold for scrapping 25 February 1946.
- Vantage – also from Beardmore, renamed Vimy 1918, laid down 16 September 1918, order cancelled 26 November 1918.
- Venomous (ex-Venom) – built by John Brown & Company, Clydebank, laid down 31 May 1918, launched 21 December 1918, completed 24 August 1919, sold for breaking up 4 March 1947.
- Verity – built by John Brown, laid down 17 May 1918, launched 19 March 1919, completed 17 September 1919, sold for breaking up 4 March 1947.
- Volunteer – built by William Denny and Brothers, Dumbarton, laid down 16 April 1918, launched 17 April 1919, completed 7 November 1919, sold for breaking up 4 March 1947.
- Votary – also from Denny, laid down 18 June 1918, order cancelled 12 April 1919.
- Wanderer – built by Fairfield Shipbuilding and Engineering Company, Govan, laid down 7 August 1918, launched 1 May 1919, completed 18 September 1919, sold for breaking up 31 January 1946.
- Warren – also from Fairfield, order moved to Chatham Dockyard then cancelled September 1919.
- Welcome – built by R. & W. Hawthorn, Leslie and Company, Hebburn, laid down 9 April 1918, order cancelled 12 April 1919.
- Welfare – also from Hawthorn Leslie, laid down 22 June 1918, order cancelled 12 April 1919.
- Whitehall – built by Swan Hunter and Wigham Richardson, Wallsend, laid down June 1918, launched 11 September 1919, completed by HM Dockyard Chatham 9 July 1924, sold for breaking up October 1945.
- Whitehead – also by Swan Hunter, order cancelled 12 April 1919.
- Wren – built by Yarrow & Company, laid down June 1918, launched 11 November 1919, completed by HM Dockyard Pembroke Dock 27 January 1923, bombed and sunk by German aircraft off of Aldeburgh 27 July 1940.
- Wye – also by Yarrow, laid down January 1918, order cancelled September 1919.

A further thirty-eight vessels were ordered to this design in April 1918 under the 14th War Programme, of which thirty-one were subsequently cancelled and only seven completed. These ships had a thick fore funnel and a thin after funnel.

- Vashon – built by William Beardmore and Company, Dalmuir, order cancelled 26 November 1918.
- Vengeful – also from Beardmore, order cancelled 26 November 1918.
- Veteran – built by John Brown, laid down 30 August 1918, launched 26 April 1919, completed 13 November 1919, torpedoed and sunk by German submarine U-404 in Western Atlantic 26 September 1942.
- Vigo – also from John Brown, order cancelled 26 November 1918.
- Vigorous – also from John Brown, renamed Wistful June 1918, order cancelled 26 November 1918.
- Virulent – also from John Brown, order cancelled 26 November 1918.
- Volage – also from John Brown, order cancelled 26 November 1918.
- Volcano – also from John Brown, order cancelled 26 November 1918.
- Wager – built by Denny, laid down 2 August 1918, order cancelled 12 April 1919.
- Wake – also from Denny, laid down 14 October 1918, order cancelled 26 November 1918.
- Waldegrave – also from Denny, order cancelled 26 November 1918.
- Walton – also from Denny, order cancelled 26 November 1918.
- Whitaker – also from Denny, order cancelled 26 November 1918.
- Watson – ordered from Fairfield, order transferred to Devonport Dockyard where laid down 1918, order cancelled September 1919.
- Wave – also from Fairfield, order cancelled 26 November 1918.
- Weazel – also from Fairfield, order cancelled 26 November 1918.
- White Bear – also from Fairfield, order cancelled 26 November 1918.
- Wellesley – built by Hawthorn Leslie, laid down 30 August 1918, order cancelled 26 November 1918.
- Wheeler – built by Scotts, laid down July 1918, order cancelled 12 April 1919.
- Whip – also from Scotts, order cancelled 26 November 1918.
- Whippet – also from Scotts, order cancelled 26 November 1918.
- Whelp – also from Scotts, order transferred to Pembroke Dockyard, order cancelled September 1918.
- Whitshed – built by Swan Hunter, laid down 3 June 1918, launched 31 January 1919, completed 11 July 1919, sold for breaking up 18 February 1947.
- Wild Swan – built by Swan Hunter, laid down July 1918, launched 17 May 1919, completed 14 November 1919, bombed and damaged by German aircraft and collided with a Spanish trawler 100 miles off of France, lost on 17 June 1942.
- Willoughby – also from Swan Hunter, order cancelled 26 November 1918.
- Winter – also from Swan Hunter, order cancelled 26 November 1918.
- Witherington – built by J. Samuel White & Company, laid down 27 September 1918, launched 16 January 1919, completed 10 October 1919, sold for breaking up 20 March 1947, wrecked while en route Charlestown 29 April 1947.
- Wivern – built by White, laid down 19 August 1918, launched 16 April 1919, completed 23 December 1919, sold for breaking up 18 February 1947.
- Wolverine – built by White, laid down 8 October 1918, launched 17 July 1919, completed 27 February 1920, sold for breaking up January 1946.
- Worcester – built by White, laid down 20 December 1918, launched 24 October 1919, completed by HM Dockyard Portsmouth 20 September 1922, mined and damaged in North Sea 23 December 1943, written off as constructive total loss and used as accommodation hulk Yeoman, broken up September 1946.
- Wrangler – ordered from Yarrow, order later transferred to White, laid down 3 February 1919, order cancelled September 1919.
- Werewolf – ordered from Swan Hunter but transferred to White, launched 17 July 1919 but not completed, order cancelled September 1919.
- Westphal – ordered from Swan Hunter but transferred to White, order cancelled 12 April 1919.
- Westward Ho – ordered from Swan Hunter but transferred to White, order cancelled 12 April 1919.
- Yeoman – ordered from Yarrow, order cancelled 12 April 1919.

- Zealous – also from Yarrow, order cancelled 12 April 1919.
- Zebra – also from Yarrow, order cancelled 12 April 1919.
- Zodiac – also from Yarrow, order cancelled 12 April 1919.

== Australian ships ==
Four of the above ships along with destroyer leader Stuart were transferred to the Royal Australian Navy in October 1933. The ships all served in World War II with three being sunk or scuttled during 1941 and 1942. During their war service in the Mediterranean the five transferred ships made up a group that became famous as the Scrap Iron Flotilla.

- Vampire (Admiralty V class leader)
- Vendetta (Admiralty V class)
- Voyager (Admiralty W class)
- Waterhen (Admiralty W class)

== Conversions for the Second World War ==
From 1937 the disposal of elderly V and W class ships ceased, and most survivors were converted to fast escort vessels. The onset of World War II put a stop to lengthy conversions, but many ships were converted for convoy escort duty.

=== Long-range escort ===
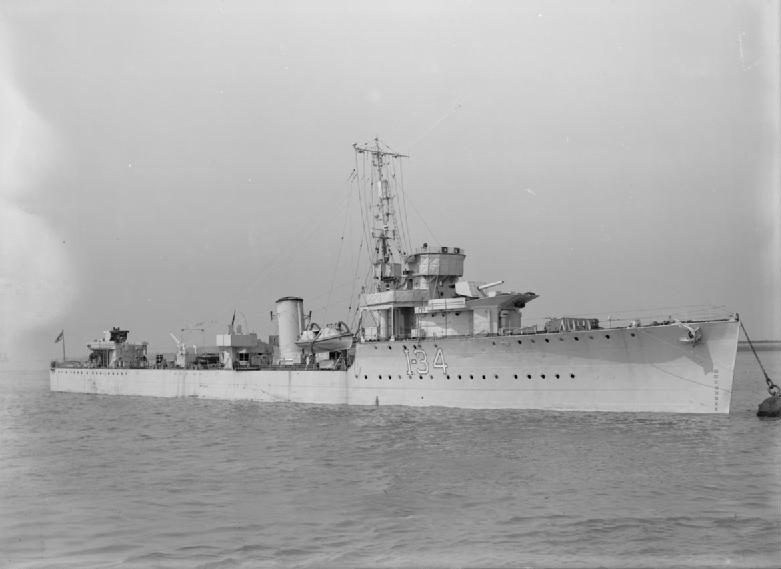
HMS Velox in 1944 after conversion to a long range escort (LRE).

The V and W class were designed to support the Grand Fleet in its actions in the North Sea, for which they were required to make fairly short, high speed dashes. Thus, they were unsuitable for the Mid-Ocean Escort Force role to which they found themselves allocated in the Second World War, where speeds over 20 knots were of limited value (as ASDIC rapidly lost efficiency) and endurance was desirable over firepower.

To remedy such shortcomings, a number of V and W class were modified into long-range escorts to suit them to this sort of warfare. The small, single-unit boiler room was struck and the resulting space divided into fuel tanks (lower) and accommodation (upper). Not only did this both lower fuel consumption and increase bunkerage, but it provided much needed space for ballooning wartime crews. 'A' and 'Y' guns were landed and replaced with a Hedgehog ahead-throwing weapon and depth charge stowage and launchers, respectively. The torpedo tubes were replaced with a QF 12 pdr anti-aircraft gun and platforms for a pair of 20 mm Oerlikon guns amidships, with a further pair in the bridge wings. Type 271 target indication radar was added in its distinctive "lantern" dome on the bridge and Type 291 air warning radar was added at the masthead, with High Frequency Direction Finding (HF/DF) fitted in some ships. The maximum speed of the conversions was around 24.5 kn (45.4 km/h; 28.2 mph).

Converted long-range escorts were (in order of date):

- Vimy (Jan – April 1941)
- Viscount (Jul – Nov 1941)
- Vanessa (Sep 1941 – Jun 1942)
- Winchelsea (Feb – Mar 1942)
- Whitehall (Jun – Jul 1942)
- Volunteer (Aug – Dec 1942)
- Vidette (Oct – Dec 1942)
- Vanquisher (Nov 1942 – Mar 1943)
- Wrestler (Jan – Apr 1943)
- Westcott (Jan – Jun 1943)
- Vesper (Jan – Jul 1943)
- Walker (Feb – Apr 1943)
- Warwick (Feb – Apr 1943)
- Wanderer (Feb – Apr 1943)
- Vansittart (Feb – May 1943)
- Versatile (Feb – Aug 1943)
- Watchman (May – Jul 1943)
- Verity (May – Sep 1943)
- Vanoc (May – Oct 1943)
- Velox (Jan – Apr 1944)

=== WAIR ===
The WAIR type conversion supplemented the construction of Hunt and Black Swan-class escorts with their emphasis on anti-aircraft capabilities for east coast service (the exact meaning of 'WAIR' has fallen into obscurity; it is often capitalised suggesting an abbreviation or acronym, but it is most likely derived from W-class anti-AIRcraft). The Thornycroft type leader Wallace was also given a WAIR conversion, but as a larger ship she also received a quadruple QF 2 pdr Mark VII mounting.

Converted ships were cleared to the main deck level, leaving only the funnels and after shelter deckhouse. The armament was replaced with four QF 4 inch L/45 Mark XVI guns in two twin mountings HA/LA Mark XIX, shipped on the fore and aft main decks. The armament was controlled by a Mark II(W) rangefinder - director, fitted with Type 285 radar for target ranging as soon as it became available. A new tower bridge, reminiscent of the Hunt class, was built and the metric Radar Type 286 air warning was added at the foremast head, replaced by Type 291 radar as it became available. The armament was completed by a pair of quadruple 0.5 inch Vickers machine guns on a platform amidships, although sometimes single QF 2 pdr Mark VIII were carried in lieu. These guns were generally sided, but a number of ships had them arranged en echelon to allow cross-deck fire. These light weapons proved to be generally ineffective and were replaced by the 20 mm Oerlikon gun as it became available, although other ships took priority and the older weapons were carried well into 1942 in some cases. Two racks and throwers for depth charges were carried aft, principally for self-defence purposes, although Viceroy sank U-1274 off the east coast of Scotland on 16 April 1945.

Ships were allocated new L-series (escort) pennant numbers upon re-commissioning

- Vanity (L38)
- Valentine (L69)
- Valorous (L00)
- Vega (L41)
- Verdun (L93)
- Vimiera (L29)
- Vivien (L33)
- Viceroy (L21)
- Westminster (L40)
- Whitley (L23)
- Winchester (L55)
- Wolfhound (L56)
- Wolsey (L02)
- Woolston (L49)
- Wryneck (L04)

=== Short-range escort ===
The remaining V and W class were not given either of the former conversions as they were either early war losses, had the valuable BL 4.7 inch main gun or had the modified boiler arrangements of the Thornycroft and Admiralty modified designs with the small room aft. This latter feature proved unsuitable for the long-range escort conversion. Thus, these ships were known as Short-range escorts.

The conversion was generally limited to adding more role-specific armaments and new technology as it became available. Additions were made piecemeal, and ships were often lost with only some, or even none, of the following modifications. In common with most elderly destroyers allocated to escort duties in World War II, the after bank of torpedo tubes was removed early in the war and replaced with a single QF 12 pdr A/A gun. They also landed 'Y' gun to receive additional space for depth charge gear and stowage. Generally, two 20 mm Oerlikons were added in the bridge wings and (when available) replaced the old 2 pounder guns amidships, 'A' gun was replaced by a Hedgehog weapon and Radar Type 271 target indication was added on the bridge, with Type 286 or 291 air warning fitted at the masthead as and when available. Walpole, Windsor, Witshed and Wivern received an army-pattern semi-automatic twin QF 6 pounder 10 cwt gun in 'A' position for East Coast anti-E boat work.

The following vessels were short range escorts (one vessel was allocated a new pennant number in the L – escort – series):

- Venomous
- Vivacious
- Vortigern
- Walpole
- Windsor (L94)
- Veteran
- Whitshed
- Wild Swan
- Wishart
- Witch
- Witherington
- Wivern
- Wolverine

== V and W class in fiction ==
HMS Wolverine (Admiralty Modified W class) as modified into a "short range escort". She retains both boiler rooms and funnels, but has "Y" gun replaced by depth charges, the after torpedo tubes replaced by a 12-pounder anti-aircraft gun, centimetric Radar Type 271 has been added on the bridge and (not visible) "A" gun has been replaced by a hedgehog weapon.

- HMS Viperous is the name of a fictional V and W-class destroyer in the novel The Cruel Sea by Nicholas Monsarrat, the leader of an escort group including Compass Rose, the focus of the first part of the story.
- HMS Warlock is the name of the leader of a flotilla of eight fictional destroyers in the 1974 novel The Destroyers by Douglas Reeman. Seven of these are V and W-class destroyers (HMS Ventnor, HMS Victor, HMS Warden, HMS Warlock, HMS Waxwing, HMS Whiplash and HMS Whirlpool); the eighth, HMS Lomond, is explicitly described as being a somewhat larger, newer and better armed flotilla leader.
- HMS Vagabond is the name of an apparently fictional V and W-class destroyer in the 1989 novel The Fighting Spirit by Charles Giddey (Wheeler) published by William Collins. In this book's fictionalised account of the 1940 Dunkirk evacuation at least 15 actual V and W class ships are mentioned.
- HMS Virtue and HMS Vagrant are the names of two fictional V and W-class destroyers in Ronald Bassett's 1977 novel The Tinfish Run.
- HMS Viking and HMS Vectra are two of the escorts of the 14th Aircraft Carrier Squadron in Alistair MacLean's novel HMS Ulysses.
- HMS Vortex is the name of a fictional destroyer participating in the 1918 Zeebrügge raid in the 1963 novel The Admiral by Warren Tute.
- HMS Whippet is the name of a fictional (the real one was canceled) W-class destroyer converted for escort work in the British Commando War Stories in Pictures comic #669, titled Destroyer!, published in 1972.

== Bibliography ==
- Campbell, John (1985). Naval Weapons of World War II. Annapolis, MD: Naval Institute Press. ISBN 0-87021-459-4.
- Chesneau, Roger, ed. (1980). Conway's All the World's Fighting Ships 1922–1946. Greenwich: Conway Maritime Press. ISBN 0-85177-146-7.
- Cocker, Maurice (1981). Destroyers of the Royal Navy, 1893–1981. London: Ian Allan. ISBN 0-7110-1075-7.
- Colledge, J. J.; Warlow, Ben (2006) [1969]. Ships of the Royal Navy: The Complete Record of All Fighting Ships of the Royal Navy from the 15th Century to the Present (3rd Rev ed.). London: Chatham Publishing. ISBN 978-1-86176-281-8. OCLC 67375475.
- Friedman, Norman (2009). British Destroyers From Earliest Days to the Second World War. Annapolis, MD: Naval Institute Press. ISBN 978-1-59114-081-8.
- Gardiner, Robert & Gray, Randal, eds. (1985). Conway's All the World's Fighting Ships 1906–1921. Annapolis, MD: Naval Institute Press. ISBN 0-85177-245-5.
- Lenton, HT (1998). British & Empire Warships of the Second World War. Annapolis, MD: Naval Institute Press. ISBN 1-55750-048-7.
- March, Edgar J (1966). British Destroyers: A History of Development, 1892–1953; Drawn by Admiralty Permission From Official Records & Returns, Ships' Covers & Building Plans. London: Seeley Service. OCLC 164893555.
- Preston, Antony (1971). 'V & W' Class Destroyers 1917–1945. London: Macdonald. OCLC 464542895.
- Raven, Alan & Roberts, John (1979). 'V' and 'W' Class Destroyers. Man o'War. Vol. 2. London: Arms & Armour. ISBN 0-85368-233-X.
- Rohwer, Jürgen (2005). Chronology of the War at Sea 1939–1945: The Naval History of World War Two (Third Revised ed.). Annapolis, MD: Naval Institute Press. ISBN 1-59114-119-2.
- Whinney, Bob (2000). The U-boat Peril: A Fight for Survival. London: Cassell. ISBN 0-304-35132-6.
- Whitley, MJ (1988). Destroyers of World War 2. Annapolis, MD: Naval Institute Press. ISBN 0-87021-326-1.
- Winser, John de D (1999). B.E.F. Ships Before, at and After Dunkirk. Gravesend: World Ship Society. ISBN 0-905617-91-6.
