= HMS Watchman =

Destroyer of the Royal Navy

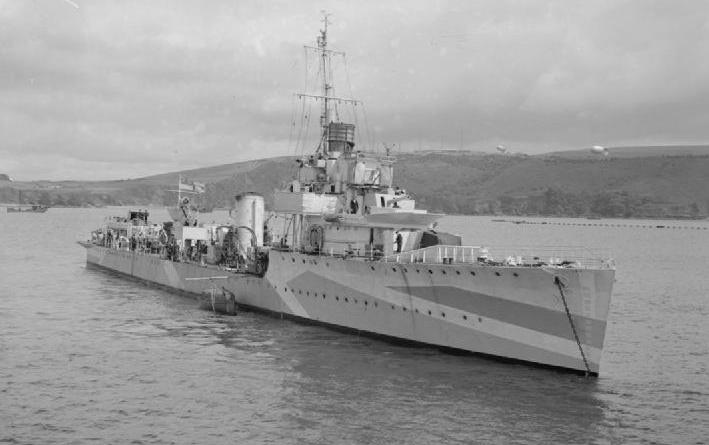
- HMS Watchman at anchor in Plymouth Sound during World War II.

History

United Kingdom
- Name: HMS Watchman
- Namesake: watchman
- Ordered: 9 December 1916
- Builder: John Brown & Company, Clydebank
- Laid down: 17 January 1917
- Launched: 2 December 1917
- Completed: 26 January 1918
- Commissioned: 26 January 1918
- Decommissioned: 1920s/1930s
- Recommissioned: 1939
- Decommissioned: May 1945
- Identification: Pennant number: G23 (January 1918); G09 (April 1918); D26 (interwar); I26 (May 1940)
- Motto: Securitas ("Safety")
- Honours and awards: Battle honours for: Atlantic 1940-1941; Normandy 1944; Arctic 1944; English Channel 1944-1945
- Fate: Sold 23 July 1945 for scrapping
- Badge: A gold lanthom (i.e, ship's lantern) with red panes on a black field

General characteristics
- Class & type: Admiralty W-class destroyer
- Displacement: 1,100 tons
- Length: 300 ft (91 m) o/a, 312 ft (95 m)p/p
- Beam: 26.75 ft (8.15 m)
- Draught: 9 ft (2.7 m) standard, 11.25 ft (3.43 m) in deep
- Propulsion: 3 Yarrow type Water-tube boilers; Brown-Curtis steam turbines; 2 shafts; 27,000 shp (20,000 kW)
- Speed: 34 knots (63 km/h; 39 mph)
- Range: 320-370 tons oil, 3,500 nmi (6,500 km) at 15 knots (28 km/h; 17 mph), 900 nmi (1,700 km) at 32 knots (59 km/h; 37 mph)
- Complement: 110
- Armament: 4 × QF 4 in Mk.V (102mm L/45), mount P Mk.I; 2 × QF 2 pdr Mk.II "pom-pom" (40 mm L/39) or; 1 × QF 3 inch 20 cwt (76 mm), mount HA Mk.II; 6 (2x3) tubes for 21 in torpedoes

HMS Watchman was a W-class destroyer of the British Royal Navy that saw service in the final months of World War I, in the Russian Civil War, and in World War II.

== Construction and commissioning ==
Watchman was ordered on 9 December 1916 and was laid down by John Brown & Company at Clydebank, Scotland, on 17 January 1917. Launched on 2 December 1917, she was completed on 26 January 1918 and commissioned the same day. She was assigned the pennant number G23 in January 1918; it was changed to G09 in April 1918, and to D26 during the interwar period.

== Service history ==
=== World War I ===
Upon completion, Watchman was assigned to the Grand Fleet, based at Scapa Flow in the Orkney Islands, in which she served for the rest of World War I.

=== Interwar ===
Watchman and the destroyer Velox were dispatched from Scapa Flow in late March 1919 to take part in the Freedom of the City celebration at Liverpool in honor of the Grand Fleet's commander, Admiral Sir David Beatty, proceeding then for a five-day visit in early April 1919 to Preston, Lancashire, to acknowledge the work of the Vegetable Products Committee in providing fresh fruit and vegetables to the Royal Navy during World War I; 50,000 people visited the ships while they were at Preston. The two destroyers then returned to Scapa Flow. Watchman later took part in the British campaign against Bolshevik forces in the Baltic Sea during 1919, seeing action against Russian warships.

Watchman was part of the 1st Destroyer Flotilla in the Atlantic Fleet from 1921. On 12 July 1921, Watchman was part of the Royal Squadron – which also included the light cruiser Cleopatra, the destroyer Wryneck, the Royal Yacht Alexandra, the French Navy battleship Provence, and two French destroyers – that accompanied King George V and his consort Queen Mary as they visited Jersey aboard the Royal Yacht Victoria and Albert.

During the Irish Civil War, Watchman patrolled off the coast of Ireland in 1922, at one point joining the light cruiser Danae in carrying Irish Protestant children from an orphanage to safety after the Irish Republican Army burned down their building at Clifden in County Galway.

Watchman was decommissioned, transferred to the Reserve Fleet, and placed in reserve later in the interwar period.

In 1939, Watchman was recommissioned as the fleet mobilised in the face of rising tensions between the United Kingdom and Nazi Germany.

=== World War II ===
==== 1939-1940 ====
When the United Kingdom entered World War II in early September 1939, Watchman was assigned to contraband control duty with the 17th Destroyer Flotilla at Gibraltar. With the start of the war, she began convoy defence and patrol duties from Gibraltar, which she continued into 1940. From 8 to 10 January 1940, she escorted Convoy HG 12 during the first leg of its voyage from Gibraltar to Liverpool, detaching to return to Gibraltar. Similarly, she and the destroyer Vortigern joined Convoy HG 22 on its voyage from Gibraltar to Liverpool on 12 March, and the two destroyers dropped depth charges on a submarine contact on 19 March; Watchman detached from HG 22 to return to Gibraltar on 20 March when relieved by the local escort in the Southwestern Approaches. She rendezvoused with Convoy OG 24F upon its formation in the Southwestern Approaches on 29 March 1940 and escorted it until its arrival at Gibraltar on 4 April 1940. From 5 to 7 April 1940, she joined the sloops Bideford and Fowey of Convoy HG 25 during the first two days of its voyage from Gibraltar to the United Kingdom.

In May 1940, Watchman's pennant number was changed to I26. On 12 June 1940, she attacked an Italian Royal Navy submarine – either Comandante Cappellini or Giuseppe Finzi (sources differ) – off Gibraltar and, although the submarine survived, the Royal Navy later assessed that Watchman had inflicted severe damage on her. After France surrendered to Germany on 22 June 1940, the Royal Navy feared that warships of the French Navy would fall into German hands, and Watchman was sent from Gibraltar to Casablanca, French Morocco, to keep an eye on the French battleship Jean Bart, with orders to shadow Jean Bart if she left port. Ordered out of port by the French naval commander on 23 June 1940, Watchman patrolled off Casablanca for the next several days to detect any movements by Jean Bart until relieved by Velox.

On 26 June 1940, the Royal Navy placed the 13th Destroyer Flotilla at the disposal of Force H, which had just been formed at Gibraltar. Watchman and Vortigern took part in an operation with Force H when they departed Gibraltar as part of a force which also included the aircraft carrier Ark Royal, the battleships Resolution and Valiant, the battlecruiser Hood, the light cruisers Arethusa and Enterprise, and the destroyers Douglas, Escort, Faulknor, Fearless, Foxhound, Keppel, and Wishart to test Italian naval and air responses in the Central Mediterranean Sea and as a diversion from two convoys attempting to reinforce and resupply Malta from Alexandria, Egypt, under cover of the British Mediterranean Fleet. The force came under attack by Italian Royal Air Force bombers off Sardinia on 9 July 1940; although the Italians scored no hits, Force H opted to return to Gibraltar rather than take any further risks, and arrived at Gibraltar on 11 July, but not before the Guglielmo Marconi fatally damaged Escort with a torpedo on the morning of 11 July. The operation succeeded in keeping the Italian Air Force from interfering in the convoy operation or in the Battle of Calabria that the Mediterranean Fleet fought against the heavy forces of the Italian Royal Navy in defense of the convoys.

Later in July 1940, the Royal Navy selected Watchman for transfer to the United Kingdom. Accordingly, she departed Gibraltar and began convoy escort and patrol duties in the Western Approaches in August 1940. From 5 to 7 August, she, Vortigern, and the destroyers Fortune, Fury, Harvester, Havelock, Highlander, and Hurricane provided the local escort for the military convoy WS 2 during the first two days of its voyage as it transited the Southwestern Approaches, returning to the River Clyde after detaching from the convoy.

Watchman was transferred to the 6th Escort Group at Liverpool in September 1940. In October she deployed with the Rosyth Escort Force at Rosyth, Scotland, and on 1 November 1940 came under attack by German aircraft while escorting a convoy in the North Sea with the destroyer Verdun and the corvette Pintail. In December 1940, she returned to duty with the 6th Escort Group in the Western Approaches.

==== 1941 ====
From 12 to 16 January 1941, Watchman joined Fearless, Harvester, Highlander, the destroyers Beagle, Jackal, Leamington, Lincoln, and Vansittart, and the Free French Naval Forces destroyer FFL Léopard as escort for the military convoy WS 5b during the first four days of its voyage from the Clyde, detaching to return to the Clyde. She continued on North Atlantic convoy defence duties with the 6th Escort Group until July 1941, when she transferred to the 8th Escort Group for continued North Atlantic convoy escort operations. With her new group, she was part of the escort for Convoy HX 143 in August 1941. On 4 September 1941, when the United States Navy destroyer USS Greer, operating on the Neutrality Patrol, detected and came under attack by the German submarine U-652, Watchman was the first Royal Navy ship to arrive on the scene to take over operations against the submarine, but U-652 escaped. With the 8th Escort Group, Watchman provided the escort for Convoy ONS 23 and Convoy ON 30 in October 1941, for Convoy HX 160 in November 1941 – the month in which the civil community of Brierley Hill, then in Staffordshire, "adopted" her in a Warship Week National Savings campaign – and for Convoy ON 51 in December 1941.

==== 1942 ====
Watchman continued operations with the 8th Escort Group until April 1942, when she transferred to the 1st Escort Group with Hurricane, the destroyer Rockingham, and the corvettes Anchusa, Borage, Dahlia, Meadowsweet, Monkshood, and Wallflower. She operated with her new group on North Atlantic convoy operations until August 1942, when she had a special assignment to carry out trials of the prototype Radar Plan Display (PPI), later known as Outfit JE. By September she was back in action with the 8th Escort Group in the North Atlantic.

==== 1943 ====
After continuing her convoy defence duties in the early months of 1943, Watchman entered a commercial shipyard at Liverpool to undergo conversion into a Long-Range Escort. She underwent post-conversion acceptance trials and pre-deployment work-ups in August 1943 before joining the 1st Escort Group to defend convoys steaming between the United Kingdom and Gibraltar.

In November 1943, Watchman transferred to the Gibraltar Escort Force. On 18 November, she and the destroyer Winchelsea departed Gibraltar to reinforce the escort of the merged convoys MKS 30 and SL 139, which were under heavy attack by German submarines of the Schill group. Watchman and Winchelsea rendezvoused with the convoys on 19 November. They assisted in the antiaircraft defence of the convoys on 21 November when they came under attack by German Henschel Hs 293 radio-controlled glide bombs launched by Heinkel He 111 aircraft. The escorts succeeded in driving off the attack, but not before the glide bombs sank one merchant ship and damaged another.

Watchman continued convoy duty with the Gibraltar escort force through the end of 1943. She and Hurricane were among the escorts of Convoy OS 62/KMS 36 on the evening of 24 December 1943 when a G7es – known to the Allies as "GNAT" – acoustic torpedo fired by the German submarine U-415 homed in on Hurricane's propeller noises and blew off 30 feet (9.1 m) of her stern, rendering her unable to move. After Hurricane's crew had been taken off, Watchman torpedoed and sank Hurricane at 45°10′00″N 22°05′00″W on the morning of 25 December 1943.

==== 1944-1945 ====
In January 1944, Watchman transferred to the Home Fleet to support and defend Arctic convoys during their voyage between the United Kingdom and the Soviet Union. In February 1944 she, the destroyer Wanderer, and the frigates Byron and Strule escorted the escort aircraft carrier Chaser as the ships steamed to join the escort of Convoy JW 57, with which they rendezvoused on 22 February 1944. Low on fuel, Watchman and the other destroyers in her group detached from JW 57 on 26 February 1944 and headed for the Faroe Islands but were caught in a force 12 gale and as she approached the fjord Watchman became entangled in the anti-submarine boom where she remained until the following day. She soon returned to convoy escort duties in the North Atlantic, which she continued until May 1944.

In May 1944, the Royal Navy assigned Watchman to escort convoys during Operation Neptune, the assault phase of the upcoming Allied invasion of Normandy scheduled for early June 1944. She joined the trawlers Ganilly and Scalpay and the Royal Canadian Navy corvette Lindsay to form Escort Group 138 for the operation. In early June 1944, the group moved to Milford Haven, Wales, to meet Convoy ECB 3, which consisted of 11 coasters operating as stores ships, three empty MT ships, two armament stores carriers, and a water tanker. The convoy's departure was delayed when the invasion was postponed from 5 to 6 June due to bad weather, but on 6 June ECB 3 and its escorts got underway and proceeded to the Solent. On 8 June, the third day of the invasion, the convoy proceeded to the invasion beaches, with Watchman and the other escorts driving off an attack by German motor torpedo boats – S-boats, known to the Allies as "E-boats" – along the way. After ECB 3 arrived off the beachhead, Watchman detached on 11 June and returned to Milford Haven. On 13 June, she began escort duty in support of convoys carrying reinforcements and supplies to the beachhead, continuing until she was released from Neptune later in June.

In late June 1944, Watchman was assigned to the defence of coastal convoys and patrol duties in the English Channel. On 21 August 1944, she, the destroyer Forester, and the escort destroyer Melbreak drove off a German motor torpedo boat attack while escorting a convoy off Beachy Head. She was escorting the military convoy VWP 16 on 6 April 1945 when the German submarine U-1195 attacked it. Watchman counterattacked with her Hedgehog anti-submarine mortar, sinking U-1195 on 7 April at 50°33′17″N 000°56′09″W. U-1195 suffered 32 dead, but 14 of her crew survived.

After the surrender of Germany in early May 1945, the Royal Navy quickly decommissioned Watchman and placed her in reserve.

== Decommissioning and disposal ==
Watchman was placed on the disposal list in June 1945. She was sold on 23 July 1945 to Thos. W. Ward for scrapping and by August 1945 was awaiting demolition. After the surrender of Japan on 15 August 1945, she was towed to Inverkeithing, Scotland, for scrapping.

== Bibliography ==
- Campbell, John (1985). Naval Weapons of World War II. Annapolis, Maryland: Naval Institute Press. ISBN 0-87021-459-4.
- Chesneau, Roger, ed. (1980). Conway's All the World's Fighting Ships 1922–1946. Greenwich, UK: Conway Maritime Press. ISBN 0-85177-146-7.
- Colledge, J. J.; Warlow, Ben (2006) [1969]. Ships of the Royal Navy: The Complete Record of All Fighting Ships of the Royal Navy from the 15th Century to the Present (3rd Rev ed.). London: Chatham Publishing. ISBN 978-1-86176-281-8. OCLC 67375475.
- Cocker, Maurice. Destroyers of the Royal Navy, 1893–1981. Ian Allan. ISBN 0-7110-1075-7.
- Friedman, Norman (2009). British Destroyers From Earliest Days to the Second World War. Annapolis, Maryland: Naval Institute Press. ISBN 978-1-59114-081-8.
- Gardiner, Robert & Gray, Randal, eds. (1985). Conway's All the World's Fighting Ships 1906–1921. Annapolis, Maryland: Naval Institute Press. ISBN 0-85177-245-5.
- Lenton, H. T. (1998). British & Empire Warships of the Second World War. Annapolis, Maryland: Naval Institute Press. ISBN 1-55750-048-7.
- March, Edgar J. (1966). British Destroyers: A History of Development, 1892–1953; Drawn by Admiralty Permission From Official Records & Returns, Ships' Covers & Building Plans. London: Seeley Service. OCLC 164893555.
- Preston, Antony (1971). 'V & W' Class Destroyers 1917–1945. London: Macdonald. OCLC 464542895.
- Raven, Alan & Roberts, John (1979). 'V' and 'W' Class Destroyers. Man o'War. Vol. 2. London: Arms & Armour. ISBN 0-85368-233-X.
- Rohwer, Jürgen (2005). Chronology of the War at Sea 1939–1945: The Naval History of World War Two (Third Revised ed.). Annapolis, Maryland: Naval Institute Press. ISBN 1-59114-119-2.
- Whinney, Bob (2000). The U-boat Peril: A Fight for Survival. Cassell. ISBN 0-304-35132-6.
- Whitley, M. J. (1988). Destroyers of World War 2. Annapolis, Maryland: Naval Institute Press. ISBN 0-87021-326-1.
- Winser, John de D. (1999). B.E.F. Ships Before, At and After Dunkirk. Gravesend, Kent: World Ship Society. ISBN 0-905617-91-6.
