= HMS Valhalla =

Destroyer of the Royal Navy

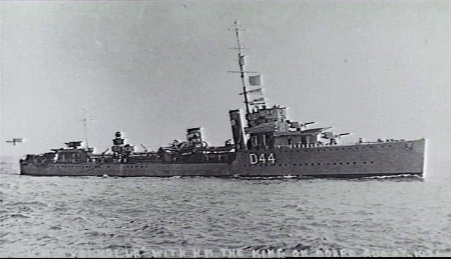
- Valhalla in 1921

History

United Kingdom
- Name: Valhalla
- Namesake: Valhalla
- Owner: Royal Navy
- Ordered: July 1916
- Builder: Cammell Laird & Company
- Laid down: 8 August 1916
- Launched: 22 May 1917
- Commissioned: 31 July 1917
- Stricken: 1931
- Fate: Sold for scrap, 17 December 1931

General characteristics
- Class & type: Admiralty V-class flotilla leader
- Displacement: 1339 tons
- Length: 312 ft (95 m)
- Beam: 29.5 ft (9.0 m)
- Draught: 9 ft (2.7 m), 11.25 ft (3.43 m) under full load
- Installed power: 27,000 shp (20,000 kW)
- Propulsion: 3 Yarrow-type water tube boilers; 2 Parsons geared steam turbines; 2 shafts
- Speed: 34 knots
- Range: 3500 nautical miles at 15 knots
- Complement: 115
- Armament: 4 × QF 4-inch (101.6 mm) Mk V L/45 guns; 1 QF 3-inch (76.20 mm)20 cwt anti-aircraft gun; 4 × 21-inch torpedo tubes

HMS Valhalla was an Admiralty V-class flotilla leader built for the Royal Navy. She was named after the home of the Norse gods. She was one of 2 destroyers ordered in July 1916 from Cammell Laird shipyard in Birkenhead under the 9th Order for Destroyers of the Emergency War Program of 1916–17.

== Construction ==
Valhalla's keel was laid on 8 August 1916 at the Cammell Laird Shipyard in Birkenhead. She was launched on 22 May 1917. She was 312 feet overall, with a beam of 29.5 feet. Her mean draught was 9 feet and would reach 11.25 feet under full load. She had a displacement of 1,339 tons.

She was propelled by three Yarrow-type water tube boilers powering Parsons geared steam turbines developing 27,000 shaft horsepower (20,000 kW) and driving two screws for a maximum designed speed of 34 knots. She was oil-fired and had a bunkerage of 320 to 370 tons. This gave a range of 3,500 nautical miles at 15 knots.

She was armed with 4 QF 4-inch (101.6 mm) Mk V L/45 guns in four single centre-line turrets. The turrets were disposed of as two forward and two aft in superimposed firing positions. She also carried one QF 3-inch (76 mm) 20 cwt anti-aircraft gun aft of the second funnel. Aft of the 3-inch gun, she carried four 21-inch torpedo tubes mounted in pairs on the centre line.

== History ==
Valhalla was commissioned into the Royal Navy on 31 July 1917. She was deployed in home waters until the end of World War I. In reorganising the Royal Navy, she was assigned to the 6th Destroyer Flotilla assigned to the Atlantic Fleet and given the pennant number D44. In the late 1920s, she was placed in reserve at Rosyth.

== Disposition ==
In 1931 she was stricken from the active list and scrapped.

== Bibliography ==
- Campbell, N.J.M. (1980). "Great Britain". In Chesneau, Roger (ed.). Conway's All the World's Fighting Ships 1922–1946. New York: Mayflower Books. pp. 2–85. ISBN 0-8317-0303-2.
- Colledge, J. J.; Warlow, Ben (2006) [1969]. Ships of the Royal Navy: The Complete Record of All Fighting Ships of the Royal Navy from the 15th Century to the Present (3rd Rev ed.). London: Chatham Publishing. ISBN 978-1-86176-281-8. OCLC 67375475.
- Cocker, Maurice (1981). Destroyers of the Royal Navy, 1893–1981. Ian Allan. ISBN 0-7110-1075-7.
- Friedman, Norman (2009). British Destroyers From Earliest Days to the Second World War. Annapolis, Maryland: Naval Institute Press. ISBN 978-1-59114-081-8.
- March, Edgar J. (1966). British Destroyers: A History of Development, 1892–1953; Drawn by Admiralty Permission From Official Records & Returns, Ships' Covers & Building Plans. London: Seeley Service. OCLC 164893555.
- Preston, Antony (1985). "Great Britain and Empire Forces". In Gray, Randal (ed.). Conway's All the World's Fighting Ships 1906–1921. Annapolis, Maryland: Naval Institute Press. pp. 1–104. ISBN 0-85177-245-5.
- Preston, Antony (1971). 'V & W' Class Destroyers 1917–1945. London: Macdonald. OCLC 464542895.
- Raven, Alan & Roberts, John (1979). 'V' and 'W' Class Destroyers. Man o'War. Vol. 2. London: Arms & Armour. ISBN 0-85368-233-X.
