= HMS Vanity (D28) =

Destroyer of the Royal Navy

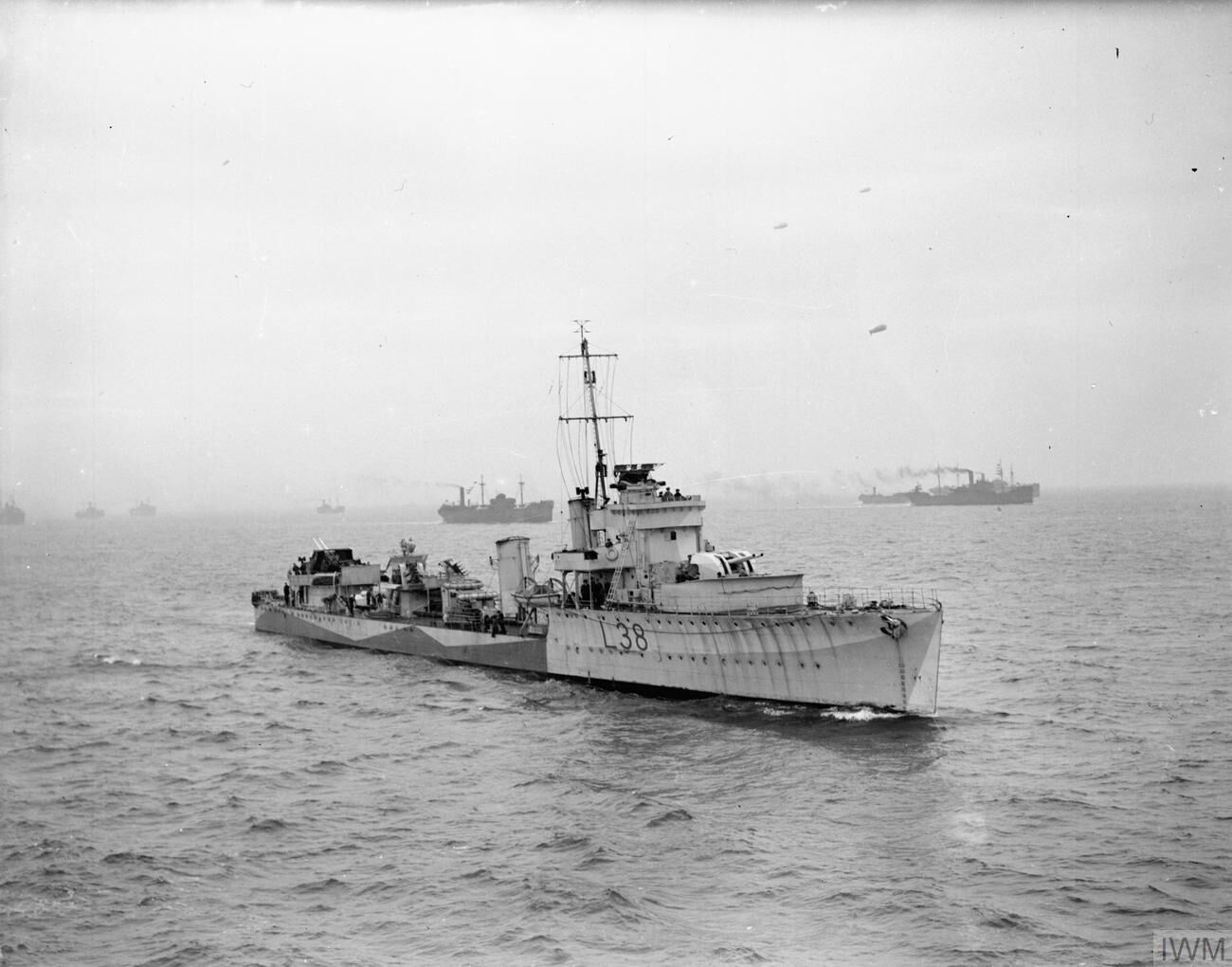
- Vanity in October 1941

History

United Kingdom
- Name: Vanity
- Ordered: 30 June 1916
- Builder: William Beardmore and Company, Dalmuir
- Laid down: 28 July 1917
- Launched: 3 May 1918
- Commissioned: 21 June 1918
- Decommissioned: 1930s
- Identification: Pennant number: D28 (1918–1940); L38 (1940–1945)
- Recommissioned: August 1939
- Decommissioned: 1945
- Motto: Vanitas vanitatum ("Vanity of Vanities")
- Fate: For disposal 1946; Sold for scrapping 4 March 1947
- Badge: A gold, blue, and green peacock's feather on a black field

General characteristics (as built)
- Class & type: Admiralty V-class destroyer
- Displacement: 1,100 long tons (1,100 t) (light)
- Length: 312 ft (95.1 m) (o/a)
- Beam: 26 ft 9 in (8.2 m)
- Draught: 10 ft 6 in (3.2 m)
- Installed power: 3 Yarrow boilers; 27,000 shp (20,000 kW)
- Propulsion: 2 shafts, 2 steam turbines
- Speed: 34 kn (63 km/h; 39 mph)
- Range: 3,500 nmi (6,500 km; 4,000 mi) at 15 kn (28 km/h; 17 mph)
- Complement: 110
- Armament: 4 × single 4 in (102 mm) guns; 2 × single 2 pdr (40 mm) AA guns; 2 × twin 21 in (533 mm) torpedo tubes

The second HMS Vanity was a V-class destroyer built for the Royal Navy during World War I that saw service in World War II.

== Description ==
The V-class destroyers were improved versions of the Admiralty V-class flotilla leaders built because the Admiralty had received reports that the Imperial German Navy was building large destroyers. They displaced 1,100 long tons (1,100 t) at light load and 1,490 long tons (1,510 t) at deep load. The ships had an overall length of 312 feet (95.1 m), a beam of 29 feet 6 inches (9.0 m) and a draught of 10 feet 6 inches (3.2 m). Vanity was powered by two Brown-Curtis geared steam turbines, each driving one shaft using steam provided by three Yarrow boilers. The turbines developed a total of 27,000 shaft horsepower (20,000 kW) and gave a maximum speed of 34 knots (63 km/h; 39 mph). The ships carried enough fuel oil to give them a range of 2,600 nautical miles (4,800 km; 3,000 mi) at 15 knots (28 km/h; 17 mph). Their complement was 134 officers and ratings.

The main gun armament of the V class was four quick-firing (QF) QF 4-inch (102 mm) Mk V guns, with two mounts forward and two aft of the superstructure in superfiring pairs. Anti-aircraft armament consisted of a single QF 3-inch (76 mm) 20 cwt gun, which was preferred to the 2-pounder (1.6 in (41 mm)) guns fitted to the earlier leaders, while torpedo armament consisted of two rotating twin mounts for 21-inch (533 mm) torpedo tubes amidships. The upper deck was reinforced to take the weight of triple mounts although the mounts were not yet available.

== Construction and career ==
Vanity was ordered on 30 June 1916 as part of the 9th Order of the 1916–17 Naval Programme. She was laid down on 28 July 1917 by William Beardmore and Company at Dalmuir, Scotland, and launched on 3 May 1918. the ship was commissioned on 21 June 1918. Vanity saw service in the last months of World War I, which ended with the Armistice with Germany on 11 November 1918. She took part in the Baltic campaigns of the Allied intervention in the Russian Civil War. The ship remained in service until the 1930s, when she was decommissioned and placed in reserve.

=== World War II ===
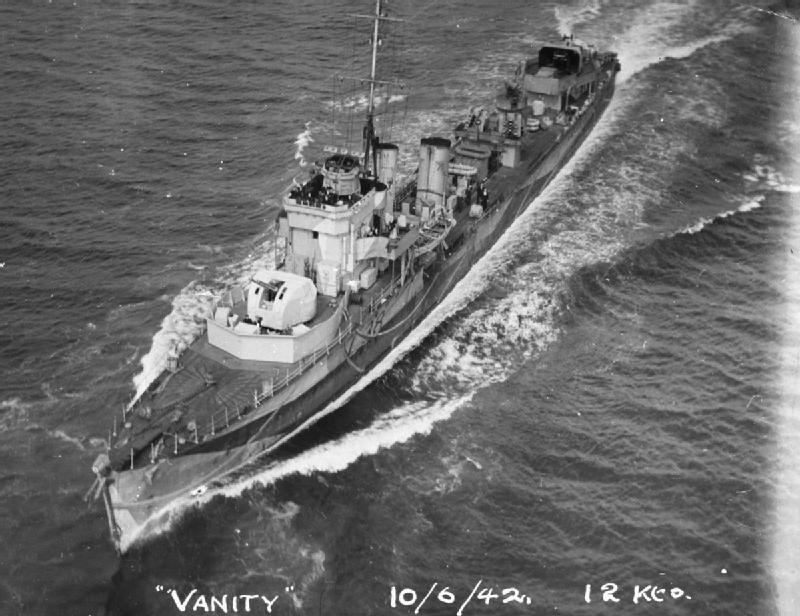
Vanity in June 1942, clearly showing the twin 4-inch Mk XVI guns installed in 1940 as part of her conversion to an anti-aircraft escort

Vanity was recommissioned in August 1939 for the Royal Review of the Reserve Fleet by King George VI. After the United Kingdom entered World War II in September 1939, Vanity was assigned to the 15th Destroyer Flotilla at Rosyth, Scotland, for convoy escort and patrol duties in the North Sea. Later in the month she was selected for conversion into an anti-aircraft escort, and underwent conversion from October 1939 to June 1940. In July 1940 she underwent post-conversion acceptance trials, and was accepted for service on 12 August 1940. She then returned to convoy escort duty in the North Sea. In December 1941, she was "adopted" by the village of Winteringham (Lincolnshire), in a Warship Week National Savings campaign.

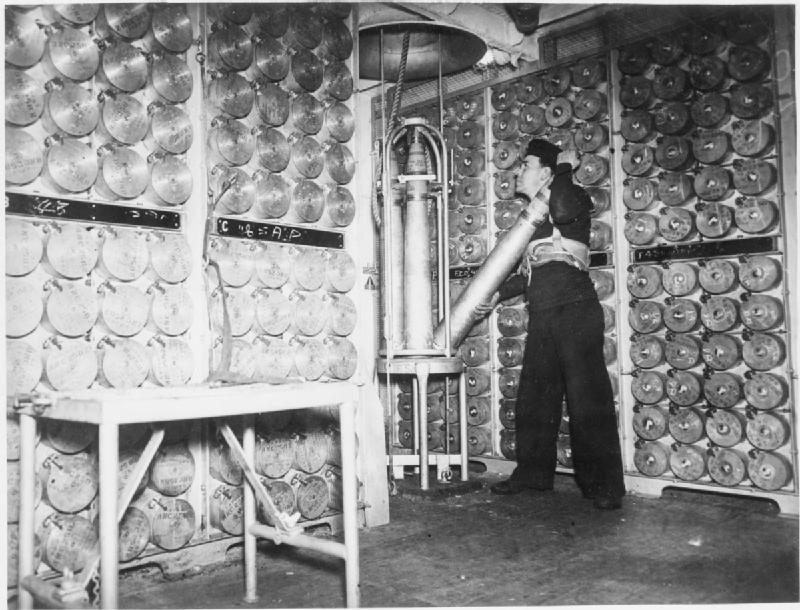
Inside Vanity's 4-inch Mk XVI shell room, October 1940

Vanity interrupted her regular duties in January 1942 to take part in Operation Performance, steaming to Scapa Flow in the Orkney Islands to deploy with the Home Fleet to cover the break-out of merchant ships from Sweden into the North Sea via the Danish Straits. In February 1942, she returned to her convoy escort and patrol duties in the North Sea, which she carried out until February 1945. She did not take part in operations related to the Allied invasion of Normandy in the summer of 1944.

In February 1945, Vanity was reassigned to convoy escort and patrol duty in the English Channel, where North Atlantic convoys had been rerouted after the threat of German air attacks from France had abated, to reinforce convoy defences in the face of increased activity by German snorkel-equipped submarines in the area. She continued these operations until the surrender of Germany in early May 1945.

Vanity was decommissioned soon after Germany's surrender – she no longer was carried on the Royal Navy's active list as of July 1945 – and was placed in reserve. Placed on the disposal list in 1946, she was sold on 4 March 1947 for scrapping at Grangemouth, Scotland.

== Bibliography ==
- Campbell, N. J. M. (1980). "Great Britain (including Empire Forces)". In Chesneau, Roger (ed.). Conway's All the World's Fighting Ships 1922–1946. Greenwich, UK: Conway Maritime Press. pp. 2–85. ISBN 0-85177-146-7.
- Colledge, J. J.; Warlow, Ben (2006) [1969]. Ships of the Royal Navy: The Complete Record of All Fighting Ships of the Royal Navy from the 15th Century to the Present (3rd Rev ed.). London: Chatham Publishing. ISBN 978-1-86176-281-8. OCLC 67375475.
- Cocker, Maurice. Destroyers of the Royal Navy, 1893–1981. Ian Allan. ISBN 0-7110-1075-7.
- Friedman, Norman (2009). British Destroyers From Earliest Days to the Second World War. Annapolis, Maryland: Naval Institute Press. ISBN 978-1-59114-081-8.
- Lenton, H. T. (1998). British & Empire Warships of the Second World War. Annapolis, Maryland: Naval Institute Press. ISBN 1-55750-048-7.
- March, Edgar J. (1966). British Destroyers: A History of Development, 1892–1953; Drawn by Admiralty Permission From Official Records & Returns, Ships' Covers & Building Plans. London: Seeley Service. OCLC 164893555.
- Preston, Antony (1985). "Great Britain and Empire Forces". In Gray, Randal (ed.). Conway's All the World's Fighting Ships 1906–1921. Annapolis, Maryland: Naval Institute Press. pp. 1–104. ISBN 0-85177-245-5.
- Preston, Antony (1971). 'V & W' Class Destroyers 1917–1945. London: Macdonald. OCLC 464542895.
- Raven, Alan & Roberts, John (1979). 'V' and 'W' Class Destroyers. Man o'War. Vol. 2. London: Arms & Armour. ISBN 0-85368-233-X.
- Rohwer, Jürgen (2005). Chronology of the War at Sea 1939–1945: The Naval History of World War Two (Third Revised ed.). Annapolis, Maryland: Naval Institute Press. ISBN 1-59114-119-2.
- Whinney, Bob (2000). The U-boat Peril: A Fight for Survival. Cassell. ISBN 0-304-35132-6.
- Whitley, M. J. (2000). Destroyers of World War Two: An International Encyclopedia. London: Cassell & Co. ISBN 1-85409-521-8.
