= HMS Wessex (D43) =

Destroyer of the Royal Navy

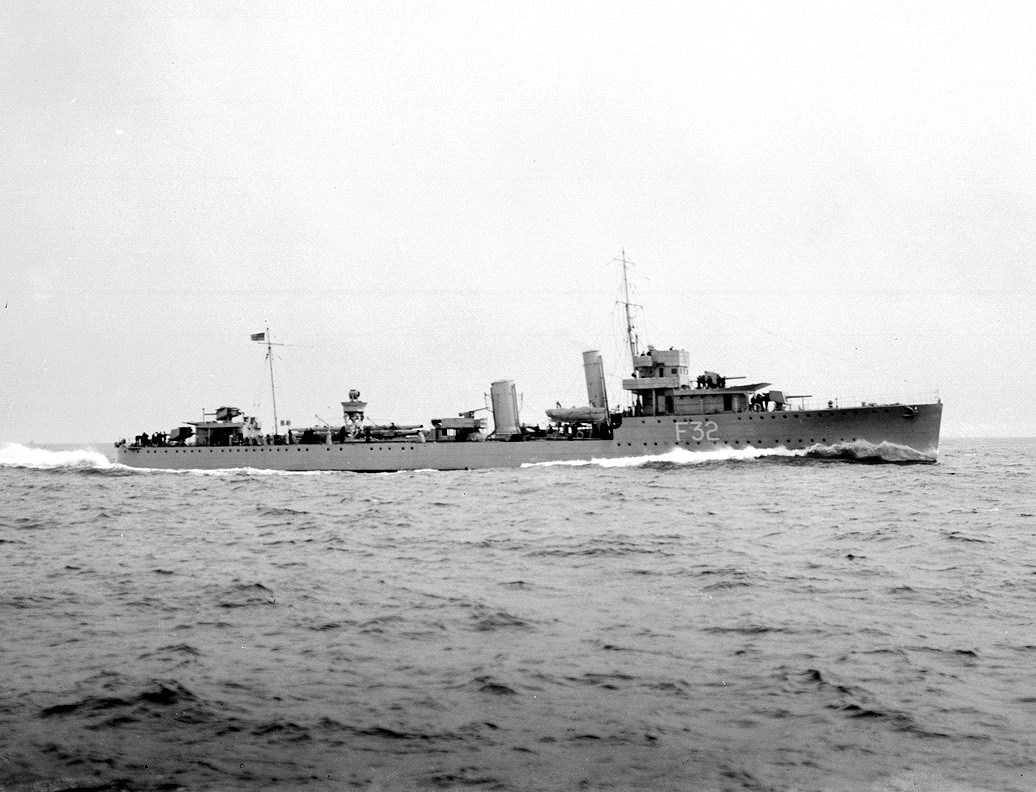

History

United Kingdom
- Name: HMS Wessex
- Ordered: 9 December 1916
- Builder: Hawthorn Leslie and Company, Tyneside
- Laid down: 25 May 1917
- Launched: 12 March 1918
- Completed: 11 May 1918
- Commissioned: 11 May 1918
- Identification: Pennant number: F32 (June 1918); D43 (interwar)
- Motto: Proles militum ("Offspring of soldiers")
- Honours and awards: Battle honour for Atlantic 1939-1940
- Fate: Sunk 24 May 1940
- Badge: The Dragon of Egbert in red on a gold field

General characteristics
- Class & type: Admiralty W-class destroyer
- Displacement: 1,100 tons
- Length: 300 ft (91 m) o/a, 312 ft (95 m)p/p
- Beam: 26.75 ft (8.15 m)
- Draught: 9 ft (2.7 m) standard, 11.25 ft (3.43 m) in deep
- Propulsion: 3 Yarrow type Water-tube boilers; Brown-Curtis steam turbines; 2 shafts; 27,000 shp (20,000 kW)
- Speed: 34 knots (63 km/h; 39 mph)
- Range: 320-370 tons oil, 3,500 nmi (6,500 km) at 15 knots (28 km/h; 17 mph), 900 nmi (1,700 km) at 32 knots (59 km/h; 37 mph)
- Complement: 110
- Armament: 4 × QF 4 in Mk.V (102mm L/45), mount P Mk.I; 2 × QF 2 pdr Mk.II "pom-pom" (40 mm L/39) or; 1 × QF 3 inch 20 cwt (76 mm), mount HA Mk.II; 6 (2x3) tubes for 21 in torpedoes

The first HMS Wessex (D43) was a W-class destroyer of the British Royal Navy that saw service in the final months of World War I and the early months of World War II.

== Construction and commissioning ==
Wessex was ordered on 9 December 1916 as part of the 10th Destroyer Order of the 1916–1917 Naval Programme and was laid down by Hawthorn Leslie and Company at Tyneside, England, on 25 May 1917. She was launched on 12 March 1918, completed on 11 May 1918, and commissioned the same day. She was assigned the pennant number F32 in June 1918; it was changed to D43 during the interwar period.

== Service history ==
=== World War I ===
Wessex served in the Grand Fleet for the rest of World War I, and was in attendance at the surrender of the Imperial German Navy's High Seas Fleet in November 1918.

=== Interwar ===
During the interwar period, Wessex served in the 6th Destroyer Flotilla in the Atlantic Fleet, and was one of four W-class destroyers (Wessex, Westcott, Westminster and Windsor) taken out of reserve in 1923 and fitted with a prototype Sonar installation as the 11th Division of the 6th Flotilla. She later was assigned to duty with the Royal Navy's torpedo school at Portsmouth, HMS Vernon.

=== World War II ===
When the United Kingdom entered World War II in early September 1939, Wessex and the destroyers Keppel, Vanessa, Vesper, Viscount, Vivacious, Vortigern, and Wakeful were assigned to the 17th Destroyer Flotilla at Plymouth for convoy defence and patrol duties in the English Channel and Southwestern Approaches. She continued in this role until April 1940.

In April 1940, Wessex was reassigned under the Commander-in-Chief, The Nore for the support of the operations of Allied forces in France. After the successful German invasion of the Netherlands, Belgium, Luxembourg, and France began in May 1940, Wessex evacuated the British naval attaché Admiral Gerald Charles Dickens to the Netherlands from the Hook of Holland on 14 May 1940 and transported him to the United Kingdom. She then was reassigned under the Commander-in-Chief, Dover to support Allied forces opposing the German advance in Belgium and France.

On 24 May 1940, Wessex, the destroyers Vimiera and Wolfhound, and the Polish Navy destroyer ORP Burza were ordered to bombard German Army forces in France advancing on Calais. They opened fire on a German armored column west of Calais at Sangatte Hill at 16:20 hours and received return fire from German artillery ashore. At 16:30 hours, 27 German Junkers Ju 87 Stuka dive bombers attacked the destroyers, hitting Wessex with three bombs. Wessex quickly sank in 115 feet (35 meters) of water at 51°00′54″N 001°45′50″E. Vimiera rescued her survivors but had to withdraw with damage from six near misses. The German aircraft then concentrated their attack on Burza, which suffered heavy damage from two bomb hits and three near misses but managed to limp back to Dover with Vimiera. The ships shot down one German aircraft during the action.

== Bibliography ==
- Campbell, John (1985). Naval Weapons of World War II. Annapolis, Maryland: Naval Institute Press. ISBN 0-87021-459-4.
- Chesneau, Roger, ed. (1980). Conway's All the World's Fighting Ships 1922–1946. Greenwich, UK: Conway Maritime Press. ISBN 0-85177-146-7.
- Colledge, J. J.; Warlow, Ben (2006) [1969]. Ships of the Royal Navy: The Complete Record of All Fighting Ships of the Royal Navy from the 15th Century to the Present (3rd Rev ed.). London: Chatham Publishing. ISBN 978-1-86176-281-8. OCLC 67375475.
- Cocker, Maurice. Destroyers of the Royal Navy, 1893–1981. Ian Allan. ISBN 0-7110-1075-7.
- Friedman, Norman (2009). British Destroyers From Earliest Days to the Second World War. Annapolis, Maryland: Naval Institute Press. ISBN 978-1-59114-081-8.
- Gardiner, Robert & Gray, Randal, eds. (1985). Conway's All the World's Fighting Ships 1906–1921. Annapolis, Maryland: Naval Institute Press. ISBN 0-85177-245-5.
- Lenton, H. T. (1998). British & Empire Warships of the Second World War. Annapolis, Maryland: Naval Institute Press. ISBN 1-55750-048-7.
- March, Edgar J. (1966). British Destroyers: A History of Development, 1892–1953; Drawn by Admiralty Permission From Official Records & Returns, Ships' Covers & Building Plans. London: Seeley Service. OCLC 164893555.
- Preston, Antony (1971). 'V & W' Class Destroyers 1917–1945. London: Macdonald. OCLC 464542895.
- Raven, Alan & Roberts, John (1979). 'V' and 'W' Class Destroyers. Man o'War. Vol. 2. London: Arms & Armour. ISBN 0-85368-233-X.
- Rohwer, Jürgen (2005). Chronology of the War at Sea 1939–1945: The Naval History of World War Two (Third Revised ed.). Annapolis, Maryland: Naval Institute Press. ISBN 1-59114-119-2.
- Whinney, Bob (2000). The U-boat Peril: A Fight for Survival. Cassell. ISBN 0-304-35132-6.
- Whitley, M. J. (1988). Destroyers of World War 2. Annapolis, Maryland: Naval Institute Press. ISBN 0-87021-326-1.
- Winser, John de D. (1999). B.E.F. Ships Before, At and After Dunkirk. Gravesend, Kent: World Ship Society. ISBN 0-905617-91-6.
