= HMS Velox (D34) =

Destroyer of the Royal Navy

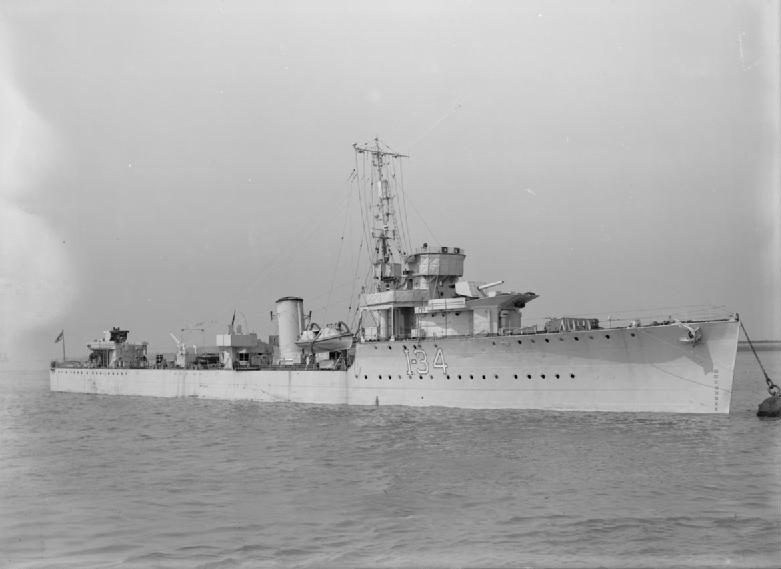
- HMS Velox, 1944

History

United Kingdom
- Name: HMS Velox
- Builder: Doxford, Pallion
- Laid down: January 1917
- Launched: 17 November 1917
- Commissioned: 1 April 1918
- Fate: Broken up 1947

General characteristics
- Class & type: Admiralty V-class destroyer
- Displacement: 1,272 tons
- Length: 300 ft (91.4 m)
- Beam: 26.9 ft (8.2 m)
- Draught: 9 ft (2.7 m)
- Propulsion: 3 Yarrow type Water-tube boilers, Brown-Curtis steam turbines, 2 shafts, 27,000 shp (20,000 kW)
- Speed: 34 knots (63 km/h)
- Complement: 110
- Armament: 4 × QF 4-inch (101.6 mm) L/45 Mark V guns, mounting P Mk. I; 2 × QF 2 pdr pom-pom Mk. II; 2 × twin tubes for 21" torpedoes. Later converted to one twin and one triple tube

HMS Velox (D34) was a V-class destroyer built in 1918. She served in the last year of the First World War and was engaged in the Second Ostend Raid. During the interwar period she underwent a refit and continued serving during the Second World War as a long range convoy escort in the battle of the Atlantic. Post-war Velox was broken up in the reduction of the fleet. Sailors of the ship took part in the Royal Navy mutiny of 1919.

== Bibliography ==
Notes

References

- Carew, Anthony (1981). The Lower Deck of the Royal Navy 1900-39: The Invergordon Mutiny in Perspective. Manchester University Press. ISBN 9780719008412.
- Campbell, John (1985). Naval Weapons of World War II. Annapolis, Maryland: Naval Institute Press. ISBN 0-87021-459-4.
- Chesneau, Roger, ed. (1980). Conway's All the World's Fighting Ships 1922–1946. Greenwich, UK: Conway Maritime Press. ISBN 0-85177-146-7.
- Colledge, J. J.; Warlow, Ben (2006) [1969]. Ships of the Royal Navy: The Complete Record of All Fighting Ships of the Royal Navy from the 15th Century to the Present (3rd Rev ed.). London: Chatham Publishing. ISBN 978-1-86176-281-8. OCLC 67375475.
- Cocker, Maurice. Destroyers of the Royal Navy, 1893–1981. Ian Allan. ISBN 0-7110-1075-7.
- Friedman, Norman (2009). British Destroyers From Earliest Days to the Second World War. Annapolis, Maryland: Naval Institute Press. ISBN 978-1-59114-081-8.
- Gardiner, Robert & Gray, Randal, eds. (1985). Conway's All the World's Fighting Ships 1906–1921. Annapolis, Maryland: Naval Institute Press. ISBN 0-85177-245-5.
- Lenton, H. T. (1998). British & Empire Warships of the Second World War. Annapolis, Maryland: Naval Institute Press. ISBN 1-55750-048-7.
- March, Edgar J. (1966). British Destroyers: A History of Development, 1892–1953; Drawn by Admiralty Permission From Official Records & Returns, Ships' Covers & Building Plans. London: Seeley Service. OCLC 164893555.
- Preston, Antony (1971). 'V & W' Class Destroyers 1917–1945. London: Macdonald. OCLC 464542895.
- Raven, Alan & Roberts, John (1979). 'V' and 'W' Class Destroyers. Man o'War. Vol. 2. London: Arms & Armour. ISBN 0-85368-233-X.
- Rohwer, Jürgen (2005). Chronology of the War at Sea 1939–1945: The Naval History of World War Two (Third Revised ed.). Annapolis, Maryland: Naval Institute Press. ISBN 1-59114-119-2.
- Whinney, Bob (2000). The U-boat Peril: A Fight for Survival. Cassell. ISBN 0-304-35132-6.
- Whitley, M. J. (1988). Destroyers of World War 2. Annapolis, Maryland: Naval Institute Press. ISBN 0-87021-326-1.
- Winser, John de D. (1999). B.E.F. Ships Before, At and After Dunkirk. Gravesend, Kent: World Ship Society. ISBN 0-905617-91-6.
