= List of ships involved in the Dunkirk evacuation =

This list consists of all major (Note: Attempts have been made to list all commercial vessels over 100 GRT according to Lloyd's Register, and corresponding naval ships, who were present in the Dunkirk area during Operation Dynamo. Vessels were exposed to the same risks: air attack, shore artillery, mines, collisions with wrecks, and grounding in the crowded channels. Therefore, those who supported the operation in other ways, such as landing supplies of water, food, and ammunition for the troops, carrying out anti-submarine patrols, minesweeping, assisting crippled vessels, or picking up survivors from the water, have been included regardless of whether they were reported to have transported troops.) naval and merchant ships involved in Operation Dynamo, the evacuation of Allied troops from the Dunkirk area from 26 May to 4 June 1940. The operation was administered by the British Admiralty with the Royal Navy providing the bulk of large vessels. They were accompanied by several other vessels of Allied navies, most notably the French, as well as many merchant ships, some previously requisitioned and converted for naval use, and others called into service from their civilian roles due to the urgency of the situation. Hundreds of small privately owned craft, known as the Little Ships of Dunkirk, not listed here, were crucial in ferrying from the beaches to these larger vessels, whilst the majority of troops embarked directly at Dunkirk harbour.

== List ==
Ships are listed in alphabetical order, disregarding any ship prefixes, which are not used by the French or Belgians. Pennant numbers are provided in brackets where known. These were generally displayed on the ship's hull, though not on destroyer leaders such as HMS Montrose pennant D1. In May–June 1940, the Royal Navy was in the process of re-allocating the pennant numbers of many of its destroyers; in most cases, the number remained the same whilst the initial letter (known as the flag superior) changed, with "D" and "F" becoming "I" and "G" respectively.

The ensign is that which was flown by each vessel to indicate its nationality. The civil ensigns of France and Belgium, as well as the naval ensign of France, are the same as their national flag, although with differing dimensions. The United Kingdom uses the White Ensign for all commissioned naval vessels and the Red Ensign for civilian vessels (collectively known as the Merchant Navy). The Blue Ensign was used for non-naval vessels in Government service, for example hospital ships and troopships. There is some evidence they flew the Admiralty Ensign, now known as the Government Service Ensign.

Different measures are commonly used for the size of commercial and naval vessels: Gross register tonnage (GRT) is the total internal volume of commercial vessels, including those requisitioned and converted for naval use, whilst displacement is the weight of water displaced by the hull, used for naval vessels such as destroyers, minesweepers and sloops. These are therefore not comparable.

Name (Pennant number)	Flag	Description	Built	Tonnage	Commanding officer	Trips to Dunkirk	Troops landed	Notes
A5	Belgian Naval Corps	Naval trawler	1917	326	Lt. J d'Hauwer	1	229	
HMS Abel Tasman	Royal Navy	Dutch coaster	1937	314	Lt. Cdr. Trevor G P Crick, RN (wounded 28 May); Lt. Charles E S B St. G Beal, RN (from HMS Kaap Falga)	1	264	
Aden	France	Cargo ship	1918	8,033		1	0	Sunk 27 May
Adjader	France	Dredger	1900	414		1	0	
HMY Adventuress	Royal Navy	Armed yacht	1898	322		1	85	
HMS Aegir	Royal Navy	Dutch coaster	1939	277	Lt. William Whitworth, RN	3	952	
Aidie	Merchant Navy	Sailing barge	1925	144	Skipper H Potter	1	0	Sunk
Aïn el Turk	France	Cargo ship	1925	2,508		1	0	Sunk
HMS Albury (N41)	Royal Navy	Fleet minesweeper	1919	710	Lt. Cdr. Colin Henry Corbet-Singleton, RN	6	1,851	
HMD Alcmaria (FY1525)	Royal Navy	Naval drifter	1916	148	Skr. Arthur Offord, RNR	1	32	
HMS Alice	Royal Navy	Dutch coaster	1939	291	Lt. Hubert Slater, RN	1	0	Sunk
HMS Amazone	Royal Navy	Dutch coaster	1939	250	Lt. Cdr. Lawrence Henry Phillips, RN (retd)	3	639	
André Louis (AD29)	French Navy	Naval trawler	1907	284	L.V. Aubert	2	549	
Angèle Marie (AD71)	French Navy	Naval trawler	1929	238		2	199	
HMS Anthony (H40)	Royal Navy	Destroyer	1930	1,350	Lt. Cdr. Norman Thew, RN (relieved 29–30 May); Lt. Ronald de Leighton Brooke, RN (the First Lieutenant)	4	3,054	Damaged by air attack in the Channel on 30 May; left Dynamo for repair
HMS Antje	Royal Navy	Dutch coaster	1912	157	Lt. Malcolm Buist, RN	2	593	
SS Archangel	United Kingdom	Troopship	1910	2,448		0	0	With Royal Daffodil transported 30th Brigade to defend Calais.
HMT Arctic Pioneer (FY164)	Royal Navy	Naval Trawler	1937	501	Lt. Robert Cambridge, RNR	0	0	
HMT Argyllshire	Royal Navy	Naval trawler	1938	540	S/Lt. John Sturdee Weddle, RNR	0	0	Sunk
HMT Arley (FY620)	Royal Navy	Naval trawler	1914	304	Skr. Lt. George Robinson, RNR	1	45	
HMY Aronia	Royal Navy	Armed yacht	1929	193	T/S/Lt. John Llewellyn, RNVR	1	42	
Arras (A05)	French Navy	Sloop	1918	850		1	542	
HMS Atlantic	Royal Navy	Dutch coaster	1930	221	Lt. Cdr. Leonard Fordham, RNR	2	311	
SS Autocarrier	Merchant Navy	Passenger ship	1931	822	Capt. C M Masters, Master	2	712	
Barbara Jean	Merchant Navy	Sailing barge	1925	144	Skipper C Webb	1	0	Sunk
HMS Bart	Royal Navy	Dutch coaster	1938	435	Lt. Cdr. Edward Ball, RN (retd)	1	0	
HMS Basilisk (H11)	Royal Navy	Destroyer	1931	1,360	Cdr Maxwell Richmond, RN	3	695	Sunk by air attack off La Panne on 1 June
MV Beal	United Kingdom	Storeship	1936	504	Capt. J W Liley, Master	1	364	
Beatrice Maud	Merchant Navy	Sailing barge	1910	102	Skipper L Horlock	1	313	
Belfort (Q74)	French Navy	Sloop	1920	850	C.C. L Viel	1	0	
SS Ben-my-Chree	United Kingdom	Troopship	1927	2,586	Capt. George Woods, Master	3	3,845	Left Dynamo after damaged in collision off Folkestone on 3 June
Bernadette (AD90)	French Navy	Naval trawler	1914	302	M.P. P Stohlberger	1	0	
SS Biarritz	United Kingdom	Troopship	1915	2,388	Capt. William Hay Baker, Master	0	0	
HMS Bideford (L43)	Royal Navy	Sloop	1931	1,105	Lt. Cdr. John Hugh Lewes, RN	1	436	Damaged by air attack off Bray on 29 May; left Dynamo for repair
HMT Blackburn Rovers (FY116)	Royal Navy	Naval trawler	1934	422	Skr. William Martin, RNR; Cdr. R W English, RN (retd)	0	0	Sunk
ORP Błyskawica (H34)	Polish Navy	Destroyer	1937	2,043	Kmdr ppor. Stanisław Michal Nahorski	1	0	On anti-submarine patrol 28–31 May
HMS Bornrif	Royal Navy	Dutch coaster	1939	336	Lt. Arthur Norman Blundell, RNR	2	146	
Bouclier (T141)	French Navy	Torpedo boat	1938	610	C.F. (T) de la Fournière	6	1,437	
Bourrasque (T41)	French Navy	Destroyer (Note: torpilleur in French classification)	1926	1,320	C.F. (D) R Fouque	1	0	Sunk
HMS Brandaris	Royal Navy	Dutch coaster	1938	249	Cdr. Charles Euman, RN (retd)	2	330	
Branlebas (T113)	French Navy	Torpedo boat (Note: Effectively a 600 ton displacement destroyer)	1938	610	C.C. de Cacqueray	3	1,180	
HMS Brighton Belle (J117)	Royal Navy	Paddle minesweeper	1900	396	T/Lt. Leonard Perrin, RNVR	1	0	Sunk
HMS Brighton Queen (J28)	Royal Navy	Paddle minesweeper	1905	807	T/Lt. Archie Stubbs, RNR	1	160	Sunk
HMT Brock (FY621)	Royal Navy	Naval trawler	1914	304	Skr. Joseph Jappy, RNR; P/S/Lt. Kenneth H G Roberts, RNVR	1	6	
MV Bullfinch	Merchant Navy	Coaster	1936	433	Capt. H Buxton	1	713	
HMT C9	Royal Navy	Harbour tug	1919	138	C or J Treleaven, Master	1	23	
HMS Calcutta (I82)	Royal Navy	Anti-aircraft cruiser	1919	4,200	Capt. Dennis Lees, RN	2	1,856	On anti-aircraft patrol 1–2 June
HMY Caleta	Royal Navy	Armed yacht	1930	138	T/Lt. James Dunning, RNVR	1	43	
HMT Calvi	Royal Navy	Naval trawler	1930	363	T/Skr. Bertie David Spindler, RNR	1	0	Sunk
SS Canterbury	United Kingdom	Troopship	1929	2,910	Capt. Charles Hancock, Master	4	4,369	
Cap d'Antifer (AD69)	French Navy	Naval trawler	1912	294		1	291	
Cap Tafelnah	France	Cargo ship	1920	2,299				Sunk
HMT Cape Argona (FY190)	Royal Navy	Naval trawler	1936	494	T/Lt. Kenneth Lee, RNVR	0	0	
Caporal Peugeot (AD9)	French Navy	Naval drifter	1923	102	M. Josselin	1	105	
HMS Caribia	Royal Navy	Dutch coaster	1936	312	Lt. Donald Swift, RN	2	583	
HMT Cayton Wyke (FY191)	Royal Navy	Naval trawler	1932	373	Cdr. R H B Hammond-Chambers, RN (retd)	1	277	
Cérès	France	Cargo ship	1918	3,073		1	0	
Cérons (P21)	French Navy	Naval cargo ship	1923	1,049				
ST Cervia	Merchant Navy	Harbour tug	1925	157	W H Simmons, Master	1	30	
ST Challenge	Merchant Navy	Harbour tug	1931	212		1	0	
HMY Christabel II	Royal Navy	Armed yacht	1928	111	T/Lt. Hubert Edward Wigfull, RNVR	1	33	
Ciel de France (C5598)	France	Trawler				2	108	
SS City of Christchurch	United Kingdom	Transport ship	1915	6,009	Capt. A W Wooster, Master	1	0	
SS Clan Macalister	(United Kingdom) Merchant Navy	Transport ship	1930	6,787	Capt. R W Mackie, Master	1	0	Sunk (Note: SS Clan Macalister (1930), built as a heavy-lift cargo liner and requisitioned from Clan Line of Glasgow, was the largest merchant vessel used during the evacuation. It was sunk with loss of 18 crew by enemy aircraft off the beach on 29 May. As she sank, she happened to settle evenly to the bottom in shallow water with the decks above water, and thereafter served as an unintentional decoy target for German Junkers Ju 87 Stuka dive-bombers. The British Admiralty later estimated the ship saved over a million pounds (sterling) worth of shipping.)
HMT Clyth Ness (FY1596)	Royal Navy	Naval trawler	1920	276	P/Skr. Ernest George Catchpole, RNR	1	150	
HMS Codrington (D82)	Royal Navy	Destroyer	1930	1,540	Capt. (D) George Stevens-Guille, RN	8	5,450	
Commandant Delage (A12)	French Navy	Fleet minesweeper	1939	630	C.C. Froget	2	624	
Commandant Rivière (A32)	French Navy	Fleet minesweeper	1939	630		1	276	
ST Contest	Merchant Navy	Harbour tug	1933	213	H J Bates, Master	1	0	
Costaud	France	Harbour tug	1934	139		1	0	Sunk
Côte d'Argent	France	Passenger ship	1932	3,047		5	5,152	
Côte d'Azur	France	Passenger ship	1930	3,047		1	0	Sunk
Credo (DG924)	France	Trawler				1	53	
ST Crested Cock	Merchant Navy	Harbour tug	1935	177	T Hills, Master	1	0	
HMS Crested Eagle	Royal Navy	Anti-aircraft paddle steamer	1925	1,110	P/T/Lt. Cdr. Bernard Booth, RNR	1	0	Sunk
Cyclone (T61)	French Navy	Destroyer	1927	1,320	C.V. (D) U de Portzamparc	1	705	
HNLMS De Mok I	Royal Netherlands Navy	Armed yacht	1940	149		3	214	Sunk
HMS Delta	Royal Navy	Dutch coaster	1934	200	Lt. Cdr. D F Lawrence, RN (retd)	2	282	
HMS Deneb	Royal Navy	Dutch coaster	1927	199		1	100	
Denis Papin (AD48)	French Navy	Naval trawler	1917	309	L.V. J F Raquez (S.O.)	3	405	Sunk
HMS Despatch II	Royal Navy	Dutch coaster	1931	199	Capt. F E Wilmot-Sitwell, RN (retd)	2	428	
HMS Devonia (J113)	Royal Navy	Paddle minesweeper	1905	622	T/Lt. John Brotchie, RNVR	1	0	Sunk
Dhoon	Merchant Navy	Trawler	1915	323		1	130	
Dijonnais (AD33)	French Navy	Naval trawler	1934	389				
Diligente	French Navy	Gunboat	1915	315		1	346	
SS Dinard (28)	United Kingdom	Hospital carrier	1924	2,313	Capt. P Lewis, Master; Mr. John W A Jones, Chief Officer	2	361	
HMS Doggersbank	Royal Navy	Dutch coaster	1939	208	Lt. Donald McBarnet, RN	2	708	
HMT Doria	Royal Navy	Harbour tug	1909	150	A W Mastin, Master	1	90	
HMD Dorienta	Royal Navy	Naval drifter	1914	101	Skr. William Reynolds, RNR	1	65	
SS Dorrien Rose	United Kingdom	Storeship	1922	1,039	Capt. William Thompson, Master	2	1,541	
Douaisien	France	Cargo ship	1920	2,954		1	0	Sunk
HMS Duchess of Fife (J115)	Royal Navy	Paddle minesweeper	1903	336	T/Lt. John Anderson, RNR	4	1,633	
HMS Dundalk (N60)	Royal Navy	Fleet minesweeper	1919	710	Lt. Cdr. Frederick Arthur Ivone Kirkpatrick, RN (retd)	3	1,129	
Duperré	France	Trawler	1918	337		1	307	
Edmond-René (AD51)	French Navy	Naval trawler	1907	288		1	0	
SS Edv. Nissen	United Kingdom	Blockship	1921	2,062	Lt. Edward John King-Wood, RNR	1	n/a	Deliberately sunk
Edwina	Merchant Navy	Naval trawler	1915	267	Skipper P Bedford	1	120	
HMD Eileen Emma	Royal Navy	Naval drifter	1914	102	P/T/Skr. Barney Everite Sebert Smith, RNR	1	114	
Elbe	Belgium	Harbour tug	1904	150		1	0	Sunk
Emile Deschamps (AD20)	French Navy	Naval trawler	1922	349		1	0	Sunk
Emma (AD89)	French Navy	Naval trawler	1902	255		1	164	Sunk
HMS Emperor of India (J106)	Royal Navy	Paddle minesweeper	1906	482	T/Lt. Charles Pawley, RNR	3	644	
ST Empire Henchman	Merchant Navy	Rescue tug	1940	243	J or E Fisher, Master	3	0	
Épervier (X112)	French Navy	Large destroyer	1934	2,441		0	0	
HMS Esk (H15)	Royal Navy	Destroyer	1934	1,375	Lt. Cdr. Richard Hullis Couch, RN	6	3,100	Damaged by shore gunfire off Bray on 31 May; repaired after Dynamo
SS Eskburn	Merchant Navy	Coaster	1917	472		1	27	
Ethel Everard	Merchant Navy	Sailing barge	1926	190	T Willis, Master	1	0	Sunk
HMT Evelyn Rose (4.136)	Royal Navy	Naval trawler	1918	327	T/Skr. Arthur John Lewis, RNR	1	130	
HMS Express (H61)	Royal Navy	Destroyer	1934	1,375	Capt. (D) Jack Grant Bickford, RN	6	3,491	Damaged by air attack off Bray on 31 May; repaired after Dynamo
ST Fairplay One	Merchant Navy	Harbour tug	1911	162	S Wright; G Finch	3	0	
HMD Feasible	Royal Navy	Naval drifter	1912	103	Skr. Charles Carstairs Findlay, RNR	1	0	
SS Fenella	United Kingdom	Troopship	1937	2,376	Capt. W Gubbon, Master	1	0	Sunk
MV Fishbourne	Merchant Navy	Ferry	1927	136		1	0	
HMS Fitzroy (N03)	Royal Navy	Fleet minesweeper	1919	710	Lt. Cdr. Reginald Arthur Forbes, RN	4	814	Damaged by air attack off Malo on 1 June; left Dynamo for repair
SS Foam Queen	United Kingdom	Storeship	1922	811	Capt. A T Mastin, Master	1	98	
Foremost 101	Merchant Navy	Hopper barge	1939	833	W E Llewellyn, Master	1	70	
Foremost 102	Merchant Navy	Hopper barge	1940	833	W C Attwaters, Master	1	200	
HMT Foremost 22	Royal Navy	Harbour tug	1924	211	C Fieldgate, Master (sick); F M Holden, A/Master	2	91	
HMT Foremost 87	Royal Navy	Harbour tug	1935	163	Capt. James Fryer, Master	2	95	
ST Fossa	Merchant Navy	Harbour tug	1929	105	S/Lt. Martin Solomon, RNVR	1	0	Sunk
Foudroyant (T52)	French Navy	Destroyer	1930	1,380	C.C. Fontaine	3	1,250	Sunk
François Tixier	France	Cargo ship	1918	499		1	0	
HMS Fredanja	Royal Navy	Dutch coaster	1936	277	Lt. Cdr. Kenneth Stewart, RN (retd)	2	680	
HMS Friso	Royal Navy	Dutch coaster	1939	250	Lt. George Osborn Symonds, RN	2	495	
Fronsac	France	Cargo ship	1906	518		1	289	
HMT Fyldea (FY666)	Royal Navy	Naval trawler	1930	377	Skr. George Whamond, RNR; Lt. Robert Bill, RN; T/Lt. John K M Warde, RNVR (U.O.)	2	180	
HMS Gallant (H59)	Royal Navy	Destroyer	1936	1,335	Lt. Cdr. Cecil Powis Frobisher Brown, RN	3	1,466	Damaged by air attack off Dunkirk on 29 May; left Dynamo for repair
Gallions Reach	Merchant Navy	Hopper barge	1936	821	J F Mason, Master; S/Lt. Francis N F Johnston, RN	1	123	
Gaston Rivier	French Navy	Naval trawler	1918	315		1	120	
Gateshead	Merchant Navy	Cargo ship	1919	744	Capt. J R Linn, Master			
Gâtinais (AD43)	French Navy	Naval trawler	1933	389		1	159	
HMT Gava	Royal Navy	Naval trawler	1920	257	Skr. Day, RNR; P/T/Lt. Francis Joseph Jordan, RNR	1	160	
Georges-Edouard	Belgium	Trawler	1937	217	Capt. M Coppin, Master	1	401	
HMD Gervais Rentoul	Royal Navy	Naval drifter	1917	100	P/T/Skr. John Henry Burgess, RNR	3	187	
HMD Girl Gladys	Royal Navy	Naval drifter	1917	110	T/Skr. Frank Francis Lewis Strowger, RNR	4	311	
HMS Glen Avon (J104)	Royal Navy	Paddle minesweeper	1912	509	T/Lt. Bertie Horace Loyns, RNR	2	885	
HMS Glen Gower (J16)	Royal Navy	Paddle minesweeper	1922	553	A/Cdr. Michael Anthony Ormus Biddulph, RN (S.O.)	2	1,235	
SS Glengarriff	Merchant Navy	Coaster	1936	868		1	64	
Glenway	Merchant Navy	Sailing barge	1913	110	W H Easton, Master	1	213	
HMS Golden Eagle	Royal Navy	Anti-aircraft paddle steamer	1909	793	C.O. ______? (relieved 30 May); P/T/Lt. James C Newman, RNVR and P/T/Lt. William L Lucas, RNR; Cdr. Edward C Cordeaux, RN (retd) (S.O.) (from 1 June)	3	1,751	
Goliath	Belgium	Rescue tug	1921	354		1	183	
HMS Gorecht	Royal Navy	Dutch coaster	1927	187	P/S/Lt. David Edwards, RNR	1	47	
HMS Gossamer (N63)	Royal Navy	Fleet minesweeper	1938	875	Cdr. Richard Cyril Vesey Ross, RN (S.O.)	6	2,940	Swept the Channel with HMS Ross on 29 May
SS Gourko	United Kingdom	Blockship	1911	1,975	Cdr. Arthur Hemming, RN (retd)	1	n/a	Hit mine on 3/4 June and sank before blocking harbour
HMS Gracie Fields (J100)	Royal Navy	Paddle minesweeper	1936	393	T/Lt. N Larkin, RNR; T/Lt. Alfred C Weeks, RNVR	1	281	
HMS Grafton (H89)	Royal Navy	Destroyer	1936	1,335	Cdr. Cecil Robinson, RN (killed 29 May); Lt. Hugh McRea, RN (the First Lieutenant)	2	277	Sunk by E-boat torpedo in the Channel on 29 May
HMS Grenade (H86)	Royal Navy	Destroyer	1936	1,335	Cdr. Richard Courtnay Boyle, RN	2	871	Sunk by air attack in Dunkirk harbour on 29 May
HMS Greyhound (H05)	Royal Navy	Destroyer	1936	1,335	Cdr. Walter Marshall-A'Deane, RN	3	1,349	Damaged by air attack off La Panne on 29 May; left Dynamo for repair
HMT Grimsby Town (FY125)	Royal Navy	Naval trawler	1934	419	Lt. William Riley, RNVR	0	0	
HMY Grive	Royal Navy	Armed yacht	1905	816	Capt. The Hon. Lionel John Oliver Lambert, RN (retd)	3	1,110	Sunk
HMS Guillemot (L89)	Royal Navy	Sloop	1939	580	Lt. Cdr. Henry Maxwell Darell-Brown, RN	1	460	Acted as baseship at Margate on 29 May-2 June
HMY Gulzar	Royal Navy	Armed yacht	1934	201	T/Lt. Cedric Brammall, RNR	4	563	
HMS Halcyon (N42)	Royal Navy	Fleet minesweeper	1934	815	Lt. Cdr. John Mark Symonds Cox, RN (relieved 28 May); Cdr. Eric Perceval Hinton, RN	7	2,003	
HMS Harvester (H19)	Royal Navy	Destroyer	1940	1,400	Lt. Cdr. Mark Thornton, RN	4	2,189	Only commissioned on 23 May, cut short trials to join Dynamo
HMS Havant (H32)	Royal Navy	Destroyer	1939	1,400	Lt. Cdr. Anthony Frank Burnell-Nugent, RN	4	2,105	Sunk by air attack off Dunkirk on 1 June
Hebe	France	Cargo ship	1920	1,684		1	0	
HMS Hebe (N24)	Royal Navy	Fleet minesweeper	1937	835	Lt. Cdr. John Bruce Goodenough Temple, RN	3	1,064	Damaged by air attack off Dunkirk on 31 May; left Dynamo for repair
HMS Hebe II	Royal Navy	Dutch coaster	1932	176		2	337	
Henri Louis (AD397)	French Navy	Naval trawler				1	98	
Henriette	France	Trawler	1906	261		1	0	
HMS Hilda	Royal Navy	Dutch coaster	1939	250	Lt. Archibald Gray, RN	2	883	
MV Hird	Norway	Cargo ship	1924	4,950	Capt. Ansgar M Fredhjem, Master	1	2,850	
SS Holland	United Kingdom	Blockship	1919	1,251	Lt. Cdr. Ernest Colin Coats, RN	1	n/a	Sunk on 3 June before could be used
HMS Hondsrug	Royal Navy	Dutch coaster	1937	227	Lt. Frederick Thomas Renny, RNR	4	1,442	
HMS Horst	Royal Navy	Dutch coaster	1939	400	Lt. Cdr. George E Fardell, RN (and entire crew relieved 31 May); Lt. Thomas E Sargent, RNR (from HMS Guillemot with volunteer crew)	2	1,150	
SS Hythe	Merchant Navy	Cargo ship	1925	688	Capt. R W Morford, Master	1	749	
HMS Icarus (D03)	Royal Navy	Destroyer	1937	1,370	Lt Cdr Colin Maud, RN	6	4,396	Damaged by air attack off Bray on 29 May; left Dynamo for repair on 2 June
HMS Impulsive (D11)	Royal Navy	Destroyer	1938	1,370	Lt. Cdr. William Thomas, RN	5	2,917	Damaged by grounding on a wreck off Malo on 31 May; left Dynamo for repair
HMS Intrepid (D10)	Royal Navy	Destroyer	1937	1,370	Cdr. Roderick Cosmo Gordon, RN	2	668	Damaged by air attack off La Panne on 29 May; left Dynamo for repair
HMT Inverforth (FY729)	Royal Navy	Naval trawler	1914	248	Lt. Cdr. Alister Angus Martin, RNR (G.O.)	1	0	
SS Isle of Guernsey (26)	United Kingdom	Hospital carrier	1930	2,143	Capt. Ernest Leonard Hill, Master; Capt. Hodges	2	836	
SS Isle of Thanet (22)	United Kingdom	Hospital carrier	1925	2,701	Capt. A J Hammond, Master	1	0	
HMS Ivanhoe (D16)	Royal Navy	Destroyer	1937	1,370	Cdr. Philip Henry Hadow, RN	4	2,220	Damaged by air attack off Dunkirk on 1 June; left Dynamo for repair
HMS Jaba	Royal Navy	Dutch coaster	1937	200		3	668	
HMT Jacinta (4.138)	Royal Navy	Naval trawler	1915	289		1	0	
HMS Jackal (F22)	Royal Navy	Destroyer	1939	1,720	Cdr. Trevylyan Michael Napier, RN	0	0	On anti-submarine patrol from 31 May
Jacobsen	France	Cargo ship	1923	523		1	181	
HMS Jaguar (F34)	Royal Navy	Destroyer	1939	1,720	Lt. Cdr. John Franklin William Hine, RN	2	370	Damaged by air attack off Dunkirk on 29 May; left Dynamo for repair
HMT Jasper (T14)	Royal Navy	Naval trawler	1932	381	Lt. Arthur Johnson, RNVR	0	0	
ST Java	Merchant Navy	Harbour tug	1905	128	W Jones, Master	1	270	
HMS Javelin (F61)	Royal Navy	Destroyer	1939	1,720	Cdr Tony Pugsley, RN	2	1,253	Left Dynamo on 2 June due to not being degaussed
Jean Bart (VP2)	French Navy	Naval trawler			Doublecourt, Skipper	2	188	
Jean Ribault (AD81)	French Navy	Naval drifter	1933	153	P.M. Dupiénois	1	97	
Jeanne Antoine	France	Trawler				1	53	
Jésus Flagelle (B1853)	France	Trawler				1	89	
Jeune France (Di1213)	France	Trawler				1	186	
HMT John Cattling (FY536)	Royal Navy	Naval trawler	1918	276	T/Skr. George W Aldan, RNR; T/Lt. Guy St C Rideal, RNVR	1	77	
Jolie Mascotte (C1347)	France	Trawler				1	60	
Jolie Rose Effeuillée	France	Trawler				1	0	
HMS Jutland	Royal Navy	Dutch coaster	1937	357	Lt. Cdr. George L Barwell, RN (retd) (relieved 30–31 May); Cdr. W R T Clements, RNR (retd)	2	520	
HMS Kaap Falga	Royal Navy	Dutch coaster	1938	378	Lt. Charles E S B St G Beal, RN (transferred 28 May); Lt. Herbert R Wykeham-Martin, RN	1	5	
HMS Keith (D06)	Royal Navy	Destroyer	1931	1,400	Capt. (D) Edward Lyon Berthon, RN	2	992	Sunk by air attack off Bray on 1 June
HMS Kellett (N05)	Royal Navy	Fleet minesweeper	1919	710	Cdr. Reginald Cecil Haskett-Smith, RN	5	1,446	
Kerkena	France	Cargo ship	1922	1,579		1	247	
SS Killarney	Merchant Navy	Passenger ship	1893	2,081	Capt. Richard Hughes, Master	1	656	
HMD Kindred Star	Royal Navy	Naval drifter	1930	115	T/Skr. Thomas W Sheridan, RNR; T/Skr. George Corney, RNR; Lt. Alexander J Dunbar, RNVR (U.O.)	1	0	
TS King George V	United Kingdom	Troopship	1926	801	Capt. Robert McCallum McLean, Master	5	4,263	
HMS King Orry	Royal Navy	Armed boarding vessel	1913	1,877	Cdr. Jeffery Elliott, RNR	1	1,139	Sunk
HMS Kingfisher (L70)	Royal Navy	Sloop	1935	510	Lt. Cdr. George Anthony Mayhew Vaughan Harrison, RN	5	638	Damaged by collision with Edmond-René (AD51) off Dunkirk on 3 June; left Dynamo for repair
HMT Kingston Alalite (FY136)	Royal Navy	Naval trawler	1933	412	Ch. Skr. Albert Henry Foster, RNR	0	0	
HMT Kingston Andalusite (FY160)	Royal Navy	Naval trawler	1934	415	A/Skr. John Bruce, RNR	0	0	
HMT Kingston Galena (FY145)	Royal Navy	Naval trawler	1934	415	P/S/Lt. James Lindsay Pringle, RNVR	0	0	
HMT Kingston Olivine (FY193)	Royal Navy	Naval trawler	1930	378	Lt. George Windsor Gregorie, RNR	0	0	
L'Impétueuse (A35)	French Navy	Fleet minesweeper	1940	630	C.C. Bachy	2	1,231	
La Boudeuse (A18)	French Navy	Fleet minesweeper	1940	630		1	281	
La Colombe (C1322)	France	Trawler				2	111	
La Flore (T143)	French Navy	Torpedo boat	1937	610	C.C. Roussel de Courcy	4	1,371	
La Nantaise (P135)	French Navy	Naval trawler	1933	403	L.V. Jaume	1		
HMT Lady Brassey	Royal Navy	Rescue tug	1913	362	Frederick John Hopgood, Master	3	0	
SS Lady of Mann	United Kingdom	Troopship	1930	3,104	Capt. Thomas C Woods, Master	4	2,906	
HMT Lady Philomena (FY148)	Royal Navy	Naval trawler	1936	417	Skr. Joseph Hodson, RNR	1	172	
Lady Rosebery	Merchant Navy	Sailing barge	1917	109	W F Ellis, Master	1	0	Sunk
MV Lady Sheila	Merchant Navy	Coaster	1935	216	G H E Brooks, Master	1	185	
Lady Southborough	Merchant Navy	Hopper barge	1923	704	Capt. A M Poole, Master	1	478	
Le Chasse Marée (AD94)	French Navy	Naval trawler	1920	251	L.V. Y Drogou	4	947	
Le Moussaillon (AD79)	French Navy	Naval trawler	1932	183		2	307	
Le Puissant	France	Harbour tug	1938	245		1	0	Sunk
Le Robuste	France	Harbour tug	1939	250		1	0	Sunk
HMS Leda (N93)	Royal Navy	Fleet minesweeper	1938	875	Lt. Cdr. Harold Unwin, RN	7	2,857	Damaged by collision with Marechal Foch off the English coast on 4 June; left Dynamo for repair
HMS Lena	Royal Navy	Dutch coaster	1938	383	Lt. Cdr. R P C Hawkins, RN (retd)	3	1,003	
Léopard (X22)	French Navy	Large destroyer	1927	2,126	C.F. C Loisel	0	19	
SS Levenwood	Merchant Navy	Coaster	1924	803	Capt. William Oswald Young, Master	1	51	
L'Incomprise (T112)	French Navy	Torpedo boat	1938	610	C.C. Gras	4	636	
SS Lochgarry	Merchant Navy	Passenger ship	1898	1,670	Capt. Ewen Mackinnon, Master	1	1,001	
HMS Locust (T28)	Royal Navy	Gunboat	1940	585	Lt. Ackroyd Norman Palliser Costobadie, RN	5	2,036	Towed damaged HMS Bideford to Dover for over 30 hours on 30–31 May
HMD Lord Collingwood	Royal Navy	Naval drifter	1930	116	(Lt) Geoffrey Thrippleton Marr RNR	1	315	
HMT Lord Grey (FY1593)	Royal Navy	Naval trawler	1928	346	T/Skr. William J Tiller; T/Lt. John A Simson, RNVR	1	123	
HMT Lord Inchcape (FY1611)	Royal Navy	Naval trawler	1924	338	T/S/Lt. Serlo Jack Longsdon, RNVR (U.O.)	1	240	
HMD Lord Keith	Royal Navy	Naval drifter	1930	116	R Pye, Master	1	315	
HMT Lord Melchett (FY672)	Royal Navy	Naval trawler	1929	347	Skr. Robert C Taylor, RNR; Lt. William H Ward, RNVR (G.O.)	0	0	
HMD Lord Rodney	Royal Navy	Naval drifter	1928	104	Robert Durrant, Master	1	0	
HMD Lord St Vincent	Royal Navy	Naval drifter	1929	115		1	150	
SS Lorina	United Kingdom	Troopship	1918	1,578	Capt. A Light, Master	1	0	Sunk
HMS Lormont	Royal Navy	Naval cargo ship	1927	1,561	Lt. Cdr. Walter Stuart Smithies, RN (retd)	1	1,084	
Louise et Marie (AD2)	French Navy	Naval trawler	1916	265		1	78	
Lucien Gougy (AD28)	French Navy	Naval drifter	1935	150	L.V. Foignet	2	283	
Lutteur	French Navy	Rescue tug	1919	150		2	287	
HMS Lydd (N44)	Royal Navy	Fleet minesweeper	1919	710	Lt. Cdr. Rodolph Cecil Drummond Haig, RN	5	1,356	Left Dynamo on 2 June due to no longer being degaussed
HMS Mackay (D70)	Royal Navy	Destroyer	1919	1,530	Cdr. Graham Henry Stokes, RN	2	581	Damaged by grounding off Bray on 29 May; left Dynamo for repair
SS Maid of Orleans	United Kingdom	Troopship	1918	2,386	Capt. A E Larkins, Master (sick); Capt. Gordon Dyer Walker, Master	4	5,503	
HMS Malcolm (D19)	Royal Navy	Destroyer	1919	1,530	Capt (D) (Note: "Captain Destroyers" - the commander of a destroyer flotilla) Thomas Halsey, RN	8	5,991	Damaged by collisions with Dunkirk pier on 30 May and French trawler off Dover on 1 June; repaired after Dynamo
SS Malines	Merchant Navy	Passenger ship	1921	2,980	Capt. G H Mallory, Master (quitted 2 June)	2	1,469	
HMS Mallard (L42)	Royal Navy	Sloop	1936	510	Cdr. The Hon. Valentine Maurice Wyndham-Quin, RN (retd)	0	0	On anti-submarine patrol 28–29 May; escorted HMS Calcutta 1–2 June
SS Manxman	United Kingdom	Troopship	1904	2,030	Capt. Philip Basil Cowley, Master (disembarked 2 June)	3	2,298	
Margaux	France	Cargo ship	1912	1,463		1	1,369	
Marguerite Rose (AD23)	French Navy	Naval trawler	1931	409				Sunk
Maria Eléna (AD54)	French Navy	Naval drifter	1932	146	E.V. Fatout	1	120	
HMS Marmion (J114)	Royal Navy	Paddle minesweeper	1906	409	T/Lt. Harry Cecil Gaffney, RNVR	3	745	
Mars	France	Cargo ship	1918	721		1	0	Sunk
Max	Belgium	Harbour tug	1911	177		1	0	Sunk
HMS Medway Queen (J48)	Royal Navy	Paddle minesweeper	1924	316	T/Lt. Alfred Thomas Cook, RNR	7	2,914	
Mistral (T63)	French Navy	Destroyer	1927	1,320	C.C. Lavene; L.V. Guillanton	1	37	
HMD Monarda	Royal Navy	Naval drifter	1916	108	T/Lt. Pearce Trewhella Lovelock, RNVR	1	110	
HMS Mona's Isle	Royal Navy	Armed boarding vessel	1905	1,688	Cdr. John Charles Keith Dowding, RNR	2	2,491	
SS Mona's Queen	United Kingdom	Troopship	1934	2,756	Capt. Radcliffe Duggan, Master; Capt. A Holkham, Master	1	1,312	Sunk
Monique-Camille (AD25)	French Navy	Naval trawler	1934	277		1	302	
Monique Schiaffino	France	Cargo ship	1929	3,236		1	0	Sunk
HMS Montrose (D01)	Royal Navy	Destroyer	1918	1,530	Cdr. Cecil Parry, RN	2	925	Damaged by collision with ST Sun V off Calais on 29 May; left Dynamo for repair
HMS Mosquito (T94)	Royal Navy	Gunboat	1940	585	Lt. Denis Harold Palmer Gardiner, RN	3	1,173	Sunk by air attack off Dunkirk on 1 June
Mouette (C1441)	France	Trawler	1906	303		1	58	
SS Moyle	United Kingdom	Blockship	1907	1,761	Lt. Cdr. Robert Henry Douglas Lane, RN	1	n/a	Deliberately scuttled 4 June
SS Nephrite	United Kingdom	Storeship	1927	927	Capt. Cyril Gilford West, Master	1	504	
MV New Prince of Wales	Merchant Navy	Ferry	1923	137	S/Lt. Peter Harry Edward Bennett, RN	1	0	Sunk
Newhaven	France	Passenger ship	1911	1,888	_____, Master; Lt. Cdr. Lionel H Phillips, RN (from HMS Amazone)	3	1,781	
MV Ngaroma	Merchant Navy	Coaster	1931	503	Capt. John William Dickinson, Master	1	30	
HMS Niger (N73)	Royal Navy	Fleet minesweeper	1936	815	Cdr. St John Cronyn, RN	4	1,108	
SS Normannia	United Kingdom	Troopship	1911	1,567	Capt. M C Whiting, Master	1	0	Sunk
Normanville	France	Cargo ship	1921	1,803		1	438	
Notre Dame Des Miracles (Di1194)	France	Trawler				1	85	
Noune (DG694)	France	Trawler				1	66	
HMD Ocean Breeze	Royal Navy	Naval drifter	1927	112	Skipper Bailey, ?; Lt. Victor Alexander C H G De Mauny, RN (retd)	2	144	
ST Ocean Cock	Merchant Navy	Harbour tug	1932	182	A V Mastin, Master	1	0	
HMT Olvina (FY154)	Royal Navy	Naval trawler	1934	425	T/S/Lt. John Handley Cooper, RNVR (U.O.)	1	244	
HMS Oranje	Royal Navy	Dutch coaster	1937	231	Lt. Hugh Trevor Crispin, RN	3	606	
HMS Oriole (J110)	Royal Navy	Paddle minesweeper	1910	441	T/Lt. Edwin L Davies, RNVR (relieved with entire crew 3 June); T/Lt. Geoffrey P Baker, RNVR (and crew from HMS Plinlimmon)	5	2,587	
HMT Our Bairns (FY1566)	Royal Navy	Naval trawler	1917	275	Skr. James Henry Miller, RNR	1	200	
HMS Pacific	Royal Navy	Dutch coaster	1938	362	Lt. Cdr. Charles John Skrine, RN (retd)	3	994	
SS Pacifico	United Kingdom	Blockship	1905	687	Lt. Cdr. Garth Henry Fyson Owles, RN	1	n/a	Deliberately sunk
SS Palmston	Merchant Navy	Cargo ship	1907	430			0	
HMS Pangbourne (N37)	Royal Navy	Fleet minesweeper	1918	710	A/Cdr. Francis Douglas-Watson, RN	3	633	Damaged by air attack off Bray on 29 May; repaired after Dynamo
SS Paris (32)	United Kingdom	Hospital carrier	1913	1,790	Capt. E A Biles, Master	2	630	Sunk
HMS Pascholl	Royal Navy	Dutch coaster	1931	257	Lt. T Johnson, RN (transferred 2 June); T/Lt. Jack N Wise, RNVR; Cdr. Charles E Hamond, RN (retd) (G.O.)	3	695	
HMS Patria	Royal Navy	Dutch coaster	1937	343	Lt. Cdr. N L J Pisani, RN (retd)	2	1,400	
Patrie (P36)	French Navy	Naval trawler	1920	754		3	771	
ST Persia	Merchant Navy	Harbour tug	1932	165	H Aldrich, Master	2	27	
Pierre & Marie	France	Trawler	1897	166	E.V. Royer (i/c convoy)	1	293	
HMS Plinlimmon (J66)	Royal Navy	Paddle minesweeper	1895	436	T/Lt. Geoffrey Percival Baker, RNVR	1	900	
HMT Polly Johnson	Royal Navy	Naval trawler	1919	290	Skr. Lt. L Lake, RNR (retd)	1	0	Sunk
PS Portsdown	Merchant Navy	Paddle steamer	1928	342	P/T/S/Lt. Richard Hepworth Church, RNR	1	618	
SS Prague	United Kingdom	Troopship	1930	4,220	Capt. Clifford Rowland Baxter, Master	2	2,891	
Président Briand (AD108)	French Navy	Naval trawler	1932	227	L.V.(?) Le Talaer	2	283	
HMS Princess Elizabeth (J111)	Royal Navy	Paddle minesweeper	1927	388	T/Lt. Cecil John Carp, RNVR	4	1,673	
PS Princess Helena	Merchant Navy	Paddle steamer	1883	246			0	
TSS Princess Maud	United Kingdom	Troopship	1934	2,883	Capt. Henry Clarke, Master	1	1,270	
HMS Queen of Thanet (J30)	Royal Navy	Paddle minesweeper	1916	792	A/T/Cdr. Sidney Peck Herival, RNVR (S.O.)	3	2,500	
MV Queen of the Channel	United Kingdom	Troopship	1935	1,162	Capt. W J O'Dell, Master	1	0	Sunk
Queen's Channel	Merchant Navy	Hopper barge	1911	583	J L Bunt, Master	1	52	
ST Racia	Merchant Navy	Harbour tug	1930	163	A C Addison, Master	3	373	
HMS Reiger	Royal Navy	Dutch coaster	1920	168	Lt. Alexander Tyson, RN	3	592	
Reine des Flots (P39)	French Navy	Naval trawler	1923	608	E.V. Le Bitoux	1	62	
HMD Renascent	Royal Navy	Naval drifter	1926	100	Skr. Richard Edward Hannaford, RNR	2	136	
Rennes	France	Cargo ship	1925	771				Sunk
HMS Rian	Royal Navy	Dutch coaster	1934	232	Lt. Cdr. John Isdale Miller, RNR	1	257	
HMS Rika	Royal Navy	Dutch coaster	1935	197	Lt. Cdr. Joseph John Youngs, RNR	2	495	
Rockall	Belgium	Fishing vessel	1930	114		1	150	
SS Roebuck	Merchant Navy	Cargo ship	1925	776	Capt. Wilfred Yvon Larbalestier, Master	1	689	
MV Roselyne	Merchant Navy	Coaster	1918	138			0	
HMS Ross (N45)	Royal Navy	Fleet minesweeper	1919	710	Cdr. John Pollington Apps, RN (retd) (wounded 31 May); Lt. Kenneth Arthur Gadd, RNR (the First Lieutenant)	4	1,096	Damaged by air attack off Dunkirk on 1 June; left Dynamo for repair
Rouen	France	Passenger ship	1912	1,882		3	2,404	
MV Royal Daffodil	United Kingdom	Troopship	1939	2,060	Capt. George Johnson, Master	5	7,461	
HMS Royal Eagle	Royal Navy	Anti-aircraft paddle steamer	1932	1,539	T/Lt. Cdr. Edward F A Farrow, RNR; Cdr. Edward C Cordeaux, RN (retd) (S.O.)	4	4,015	
MV Royal Sovereign	United Kingdom	Troopship	1937	1,527	Capt. Thomas Aldis, Master	6	6,370	
Royalty	Merchant Navy	Sailing barge		101	H Miller, Master	1	0	Sunk
HMS Ruja	Royal Navy	Dutch coaster	1926	175	Lt. Harold Roger Webber, RN	1	217	
SS Rye	Merchant Navy	Cargo ship	1924	1,048		0		
HMS Sabre (H18)	Royal Navy	Destroyer	1918	905	Cdr. Brian Dean, RN (retd)	10	3,912	Damaged by shore gunfire off Calais on 30 May; repaired after Dynamo
Saint Camille	France	Cargo ship	1920	3,274				Sunk
Saint Octave	France	Cargo ship	1922	5,099		1	0	Sunk
HMS Saladin (H54)	Royal Navy	Destroyer	1919	905	Lt. Cdr. Laurence James Dover, RN	1	0	Damaged by air attack off Bray on 29 May; left Dynamo for repair
HMS Salamander (N86)	Royal Navy	Fleet minesweeper	1936	815	Lt. Cdr. Lionel James Spencer Ede, RN	3	1,193	Damaged by air attack off Bray on 1 June; left Dynamo for repair
Salomé	France	Tanker	1940	13,400		1	0	Sunk
HMS Saltash (N62)	Royal Navy	Fleet minesweeper	1918	710	Lt. Cdr. Thomas Randall Fowke, RN	3	750	Left Dynamo on 3 June due to minor damage and crew exhaustion
HMS San Antonio	Royal Navy	Dutch coaster	1909	410	Lt. Cdr. George Victor Legassick, RNR	2	431	
HMS Sandown (J20)	Royal Navy	Paddle minesweeper	1934	684	A/Cdr. Kenneth Morland Greig, RN (retd) (S.O.)	2	695	
HMT Saon (FY159)	Royal Navy	Naval trawler	1933	386	Lt. Cdr. Arthur Geoffrey Gascoyne Webb, RN (retd)	1	31	
HMT Sarah Hide (FY968)	Royal Navy	Naval trawler	1921	162		1	90	
HMY Sargasso (FY053)	Royal Navy	Armed yacht	1926	216	T/Lt. Charles C L Gaussen, RNVR	3	455	
Sassa	French Navy	Tanker	1936	750		1	0	Sunk
Sauternes (P22)	French Navy	Naval cargo ship	1922	1,049		2	870	
Savorgnan de Brazza (A03)	French Navy	Sloop	1932	1,969		1	5	
HMS Scimitar (H21)	Royal Navy	Destroyer	1918	905	Lt. Robert Denys Franks, RN	5	2,716	Seriously damaged by collision with HMS Icarus off Dunkirk on 31 May returned to Dover; left Dynamo for repair on 2 June
TSS Scotia	United Kingdom	Troopship	1921	3,454	Capt. William Henry Hughes, Master	1	2,430	Sunk
MV Scottish Co-operator	United Kingdom	Storeship	1939	513	Capt. T S Robertson, Master	1	525	
MV Seine	Merchant Navy	Coaster	1926	179	Mr. C V Cogger, Master; Lt. Cdr. P M Filleul, RN (retd)	2	543	
MV Sequacity	United Kingdom	Storeship	1937	870	Capt. J Macdonald	0	0	Sunk
HMS Sharpshooter (N68)	Royal Navy	Fleet minesweeper	1937	835	Lt. Andrew Edward Doran, RN	3	342	Damaged by collision with SS St Helier on 30 May; left Dynamo for repair
HMS Shearwater (L39)	Royal Navy	Sloop	1939	580	Lt. Cdr. Philip Frederick Powlett, RN	0	250	On anti-submarine patrol 28–29 May; escorted HMS Calcutta 1–2 June; troops transferred from SS Prague off English coast
HMS Sheldrake (L06)	Royal Navy	Sloop	1937	530	Lt. Cdr. Arthur Edward Tolfrey Christie, RN	1	0	On anti-submarine patrol 28–1 June; demolished wrecks of HMS Wakeful on 30 May and Basilisk on 2–3 June
Sherfield	Merchant Navy	Motor barge	1917	145	A/S/Lt. John David Farquharson Kealey, RN	1	74	
HMS Shikari (D85)	Royal Navy	Destroyer	1924	905	Lt. Cdr. Hugh Nicholas Aubyn Richardson, RN	7	3,349	Last Allied ship to leave Dunkirk, on 4 June
Siroco (T62)	French Navy	Destroyer	1927	1,320	C.C. de Toulouse-Lautrec-Montfa	1	509	
HMS Skipjack (N38)	Royal Navy	Fleet minesweeper	1935	815	Lt. Cdr. Francis Babington Proudfoot, RN (retd)	4	959	Sunk by air attack off Malo on 1 June
HMS Snaefell (J118)	Royal Navy	Paddle minesweeper	1907	466	T/Lt. Frank Brett, RNVR	2	981	
MV Southend Britannia	Merchant Navy	Ferry	1924	147	T/Lt. Gordon Little Norton, RNVR	1	0	
HMS Speedwell (N87)	Royal Navy	Fleet minesweeper	1935	815	Lt. Cdr. Frederick Richard Guy Maunsell, RN (retd)	3	1,502	
HMT Sphene (FY249)	Royal Navy	Naval trawler	1934	412	Skr. Charles Pennington, RNR	0	0	
HMT Spurs (FY168)	Royal Navy	Naval trawler	1933	399	Skr. Herbert Henry Jarvis, RNR	0	0	
HMT St Abbs (W02)	Royal Navy	Rescue tug	1918	465	Lt. T E Brooker, RN (retd)	2	0	Sunk
HMT St Achilleus (FY152)	Royal Navy	Naval trawler	1934	484	T/Lt. Harry Alfred Gellett, RNVR (S.O.)	0	0	Sunk
SS St Andrew (24)	United Kingdom	Hospital carrier	1932	2,702	Capt. Herbert Cecil Bond, Master	1	122	
HMT St Clears (W06)	Royal Navy	Rescue tug	1919	468	William Josiah Penny, Master	1	70	
SS St David (27)	United Kingdom	Hospital carrier	1932	2,702	Capt. C Joy, Master (sick); Capt. B H Mendus, Master	1	118	
HMT St Fagan (W74)	Royal Navy	Rescue tug	1919	420	Lt. Cdr. George Henry Warren, RN	2	0	Sunk
SS St Helier	United Kingdom	Troopship	1925	1,952	Capt. Reginald Richard Pitman, Master	4	4,233	
SS St Julien (29)	United Kingdom	Hospital carrier	1925	1,952	Capt. L T Richardson, Master	1	247	
HMT St Olaves (W40)	Royal Navy	Rescue tug	1919	468	T/Skr. Henry Forester, RNR	2	200	
SS St Seiriol	United Kingdom	Troopship	1931	1,586	Capt. R D Dobb, Master; Mr. J McNamee, Chief Officer; T/Lt. Alan Raymond MacKewn, RNR	2	672	
HMT Stella Dorado (FY131)	Royal Navy	Naval trawler	1935	416	P/Skr. Walter Harcourt Burgess, RNR	1	22	Sunk
HMT Stella Rigel (FY657)	Royal Navy	Naval trawler	1926	358	Skr. Lewis P Keable, RNR; P/T/S/Lt. James W Wykeham, RNVR (U.O.)	0	0	
HMT Strathelliot	Royal Navy	Naval trawler	1915	211	P/T/S/Lt. Walter Edward Mercer, RNVR	2	335	
HMD Strive	Royal Navy	Naval drifter	1912	102	T/Skr. Henry Arthur Catchpole, RNR	1	243	
ST Sun	Merchant Navy	Harbour tug	1906	130	Cdr. Edward Kirby LeMesurier, RN	1	173	
HMT Sun III	Royal Navy	Harbour tug	1909	197	F W Russell, Master	1	148	
ST Sun IV	Merchant Navy	Harbour tug	1915	200	Mr. C G Alexander, Master; Lt. John E L Martin, RN	3	239	
ST Sun V	Merchant Navy	Harbour tug	1915	200	W H Mastin, Master	0	0	
HMT Sun VII	Royal Navy	Harbour tug	1917	202	G Cawsey, Master	1	0	
HMT Sun VIII	Royal Navy	Harbour tug	1919	196	S Smith, Master	1	120	
ST Sun X	Merchant Navy	Harbour tug	1920	196	W A Fothergill, Master	1	211	
ST Sun XI	Merchant Navy	Harbour tug	1925	183	J R Lukes, Master	2	188	
ST Sun XII	Merchant Navy	Harbour tug	1925	183	A V Mee, Master	1	0	
ST Sun XV	Merchant Navy	Harbour tug	1925	183	J J Belton, Master; Cdr. Jeffery Elliott, RNR (from sunk HMS King Orry)	2	106	
HMS Sursum Corda	Royal Navy	Dutch coaster	1933	199	Lt. Christopher Phillpotts, RN	1	277	
HMS Sutton (N78)	Royal Navy	Fleet minesweeper	1918	710	A/Cdr. Grenville Mathias Temple, RN (retd) (S.O.)	4	1,100	
ST Tanga	Merchant Navy	Harbour tug	1931	203	Harry Philip Gouge, Master	3	367	
HMY Taransay (FY057)	Royal Navy	Armed yacht	1930	175		1	162	
Thames	Belgium	Harbour tug	1904	144		1	0	Sunk
HMT Thomas Bartlett (FY553)	Royal Navy	Naval trawler	1918	290	T/Skr. John Jeffrey Tomlinson, RNR	1	0	Sunk
HMT Thrifty (FY1523)	Royal Navy	Naval trawler	1916	139		1	0	
HMT Thuringia (FY106)	Royal Navy	Naval trawler	1933	396	Ch. Skr. David William Leon Simpson, RNR		0	Sunk
HMS Tilly	Royal Navy	Dutch coaster	1939	381	Cdr. W R T Clements, RNR; Lt. Cdr. Clement M Ramus, RNR (retd)	3	588	
HMS Tiny	Royal Navy	Dutch coaster	1939	351	Lt. Cdr. Jack M D Hunter, RN (retd); Lt. Martin, RN	1	261	
HMT Topaze (T40)	Royal Navy	Naval trawler	1935	421	Lt. Cdr. John Nicholas Hambly, RN (S.O.)	1	118	
HMS Twente	Royal Navy	Dutch coaster	1937	239	Lt. Cdr. Humphry Gilbert Boys-Smith, RNR (to 30 May); Lt. A W McMullan, RNR (retd)	3	900	
SS Tynwald	United Kingdom	Troopship	1937	2,376	Capt. W A Qualtrough, Master (relieved 2 June); Mr. John H Whiteway, Chief Officer; Lt. Cdr. William C Bushell, RN (both from 2 June)	5	6,880	
HMS Vanquisher (D54)	Royal Navy	Destroyer	1917	1,090	Lt. Cdr. Conrad Alers-Hankey, RN (relieved 30 May-2 June); Lt. Cdr. William Charles Bushell, RN	7	2,704	Damaged by grounding on debris at Dunkirk; repaired after Dynamo
HMS Vega (L41)	Royal Navy	Destroyer	1917	1,090	Cdr. Cyril Ivan Horton, RN	0	34	On anti-submarine patrol 28–31 May; picked up survivors from a boat
HMT Velia	Royal Navy	Naval trawler	1914	290	Skr. J Clarkson, RNR	1	0	
HMS Venomous (D75)	Royal Navy	Destroyer	1919	1,120	Lt. Cdr. John Edwin Home McBeath, RN	5	3,128	Damaged by air attack in Dunkirk harbour on 31 May; repaired after Dynamo
Vénus (AD76)	French Navy	Naval trawler	1906	264	E.V. de R Rosec	2	207	
HMS Verity (D63)	Royal Navy	Destroyer	1919	1,120	Lt. Cdr. Arthur Black, RN (wounded 27 May); Lt. Eric Lister Jones, RN (the First Lieutenant)	3	367	Damaged by shellfire off Calais 27 May. Left Dynamo on 30 May due to crew morale
HMS Vimy (D33)	Royal Navy	Destroyer	1918	1,090	Lt. Cdr. Richard Knowling (missing 28 May); Lt. Adrian Northey, RN (the First Lieutenant); Lt. Cdr. Michael Wentworth Ewart-Wentworth, RN (retd) (from 29 May)	7	2,987	Damaged by collision with HMY Amulree off the English coast on 1 June; left Dynamo for repair
ST Vincia	Merchant Navy	Harbour tug	1909	150	A V Hoiles, Master	1	24	
HMS Vivacious (D36)	Royal Navy	Destroyer	1917	1,090	Lt. Cdr. Frank Reginald Woodbine Parish, RN (relieved 30 May); Cdr Emile Dechaineux, RAN	5	1,649	Damaged by shore gunfire off Bray on 31 May; repaired after Dynamo
HMT Viviana (FY238)	Royal Navy	Naval trawler	1936	452	Skr. Gunnar Lie Olesen, RNR		0	
HMS Vrede	Royal Navy	Dutch coaster	1932	400	Lt. Cdr. Robert Tindle Lampard, RN	1	473	
Vulcain	Belgium	Harbour tug	1903	200		1	0	Sunk
W.24	Merchant Navy	Hopper barge	1938	870	H F Boyce, Master	2	1,060	
W.26	Merchant Navy	Hopper barge	1938		W J Allen, Master	1	296	
HMS Wakeful (L91)	Royal Navy	Destroyer	1917	1,100	Cdr. Ralph Lindsay Fisher, RN	2	631	Sunk by E-boat torpedo in the Channel on 29 May
HMS Waverley (J51)	Royal Navy	Paddle minesweeper	1899	537	T/Lt. Sydney Frederick Harmer-Elliott, RNVR (A/S.O.)	1	0	Sunk by E-boat torpedo in the Channel on 29 May
HMS Wega	Royal Navy	Dutch coaster	1927	192			0	
SS Westcove	United Kingdom	Blockship	1912	2,734	Lt. Cdr. Alec Murray McKillop, RN	1	n/a	Deliberately sunk
HMT Westella (FY161)	Royal Navy	Naval trawler	1934	413	Ch. Skr. Andrew Gove, RNR	0	0	Sunk
HMS Westward Ho (J43)	Royal Navy	Paddle minesweeper	1894	460	T/Lt. A L U Braithwaite, RNVR	3	1,686	
PS Whippingham	Merchant Navy	Paddle steamer	1930	825	T/Lt. Eric Reed, RNR	1	2,500	
HMS Whitehall (D94)	Royal Navy	Destroyer	1924	1,120	Lt. Cdr. Archibald Boyd Russell, RN	5	2,762	Damaged by collision with HMY Grive off Dunkirk on 31 May; repaired after Dynamo
HMS Whitshed (D77)	Royal Navy	Destroyer	1919	1,120	Cdr. Edward Reignier Conder, RN	3	1,038	Damaged by collisions with a Dutch coaster at Dover on 2 June and a paddle minesweeper off Dunkirk on 3 June; repaired after Dynamo
SS Whitstable	Merchant Navy	Cargo ship	1925	688	Capt. W Baxter, Master	1	14	
HMS Widgeon (L62)	Royal Navy	Sloop	1938	530	Lt. Cdr. Roger Frederick, RN	0	151	On anti-submarine patrol 28–31 May; picked up survivors from sunken Siroco mid-Channel on 31 May
HMS Wild Swan (D62)	Royal Navy	Destroyer	1919	1,120	Lt. Cdr. John Leslie Younghusband, RN	1	21	Damaged by air attack off Dunkirk on 26 May; left Dynamo for repair
HMS Winchelsea (D46)	Royal Navy	Destroyer	1918	1,100	Lt. Cdr. William Alan Frank Hawkins, RN	6	4,017	Damaged by grounding off Bray on 31 May; repaired after Dynamo
HMS Windsor (L94)	Royal Navy	Destroyer	1918	1,100	Lt Cdr Peter Pelly, RN	6	3,991	Damaged by air attack off the English coast on 28 May; repaired after Dynamo
HMS Wolfhound (D56)	Royal Navy	Destroyer	1918	1,100	Lt. Cdr. John Wentworth McCoy, RN	1	142	Damaged by grounding in Dunkirk harbour on 27 May; left Dynamo for repair
HMS Wolsey (L02)	Royal Navy	Destroyer	1918	1,120	Lt. Cdr. Colin Henry Campbell, RN	6	3,056	Damaged by collision with SS Roebuck off Dunkirk on 31 May; left Dynamo for repair
HMT Wolves (FY158)	Royal Navy	Naval trawler	1934	422	Skr. John D Fowler, RNR; Skr. Wilfred S Flowers, RNR	1	50	
MV Wootton	Merchant Navy	Ferry	1928	154			0	
HMS Worcester (D96)	Royal Navy	Destroyer	1922	1,120	Cdr. John Hamilton Allison, RN	6	4,661	Damaged by air attack off Dunkirk on 1 June; left Dynamo for repair
SS Worthing (30)	United Kingdom	Hospital carrier	1928	2,294	Capt. C G G Munton, Master	2	600	
SS Worthtown	United Kingdom	Storeship	1939	868			0	
X.95	Royal Navy	Motor lighter	1915	124		1	0	
X.149	Royal Navy	Motor lighter	1915	124		1	0	
X.209	Royal Navy	Motor lighter	1916	120	R G Banks, A/Master; A/S/Lt. William R Williams, RN	1	67	
X.213	Royal Navy	Motor lighter	1916	120		1	0	
X.217	Royal Navy	Motor lighter	1916	120	S/Lt. Richard Anthony West Pool, RN	1	250	
SS Yewdale	United Kingdom	Storeship	1929	823	Capt. E Jones	1	940	
HMD Yorkshire Lass	Royal Navy	Naval drifter	1920	111	T/Lt. Edward H G Hope, RNVR; T/S/Lt. Michael A A Chodzko, RNVR	4	391	
HMS Zeus	Royal Navy	Dutch coaster	1927	200	Lt. Cdr. Cecil Brooke Hoggan, RNR	2	601	
MS Batory	Polish Navy	Polish ocean liner	1936	14,287		1	2500	Later she carried as many as 6,000 people in one evacuation.

== See also ==
- Little ships of Dunkirk
