= HMS Wivern (D66) =

Destroyer of the Royal Navy

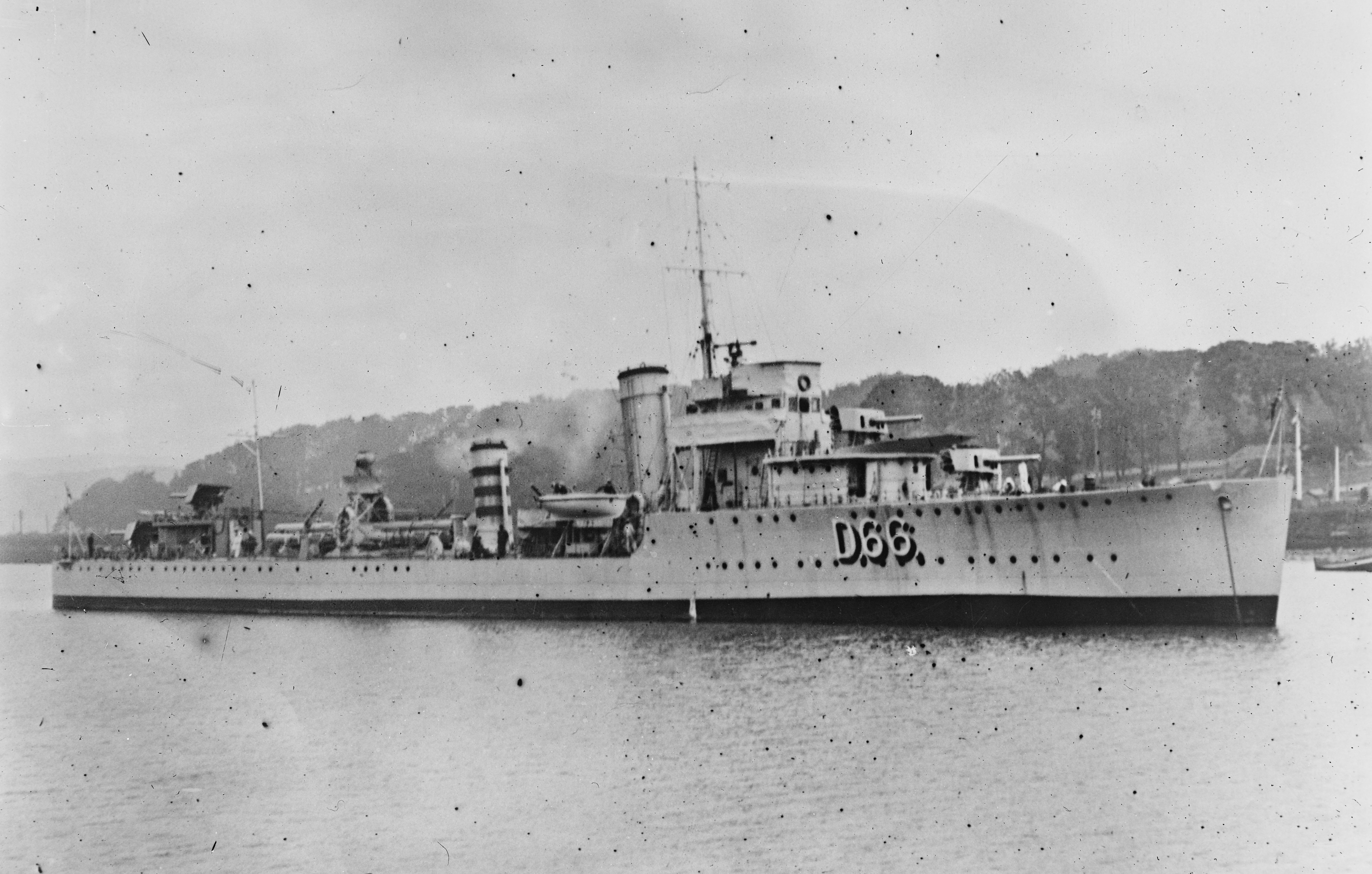
- HMS Wivern in Londonderry Port in 1920

History

United Kingdom
- Name: HMS Wivern
- Namesake: Variant spelling of wyvern
- Ordered: April 1918
- Builder: J. Samuel White, Cowes, Isle of Wight
- Laid down: 19 August 1918
- Launched: 16 April 1919
- Completed: 23 December 1919
- Commissioned: 23 December 1919
- Decommissioned: 1920s or 1930s
- Recommissioned: 1939
- Decommissioned: April 1943
- Recommissioned: September 1944
- Decommissioned: summer 1945
- Motto: Beware
- Nickname(s): "Tiddly Wiv"
- Honours and awards: Battle honours for: Atlantic 1939-1943; North Africa 1942-1943; North Sea 1944-1945
- Fate: Sold for scrapping 18 February 1947
- Badge: A gold wyvern on a green field

General characteristics
- Class & type: Admiralty Modified W-class destroyer
- Displacement: 1,140 tons standard, 1,550 tons full
- Length: 300 feet (91 m) o/a, 312 feet (95 m) p/p
- Beam: 29.5 feet (9.0 m)
- Draught: 9 feet (2.7 m), 11.25 feet (3.43 m) under full load
- Propulsion: Yarrow type Water-tube boilers, Brown-Curtis geared steam turbines, 2 shafts, 27,000 shp
- Speed: 34 knots (63 km/h)
- Range: 320–370 tons oil; 3,500 nautical miles (6,500 km) at 15 knots (28 km/h); 900 nautical miles (1,700 km) at 32 knots (59 km/h)
- Complement: 127
- Sensors & processing systems: Type 286M Air Warning Radar fitted 1940; Type 271 Surface Warning Radar fitted 1940
- Armament: As built 1920: 4 × BL 4.7 in (120-mm) Mk.I guns, mount P Mk.I; 2 × QF 2 pdr Mk.II "pom-pom" (40 mm L/39); 6 × 21-inch Torpedo Tubes; 1940 SRE conversion: 3 × BL 4.7 in (120mm) Mk.I L/45 guns; 1 × 3 in (76 mm) AA gun; 2 × QF 2 pdr Mk.II "pom-pom" (40 mm L/39); 3 × 21-inch torpedo tubes (one triple mount); 2 × depth charge racks; twin QF 6 pounder 10 cwt gun (1942 – replaced 'A' gun)

The second HMS Wivern (D66, later I66), was a Modified W-class destroyer of the British Royal Navy that saw service in World War II.

== Building and commissioning ==
Wivern was ordered in April 1918 as part of the 13th Order of the 1917-1918 Naval Programme. She was laid down on 19 August 1918 by J. Samuel White at Cowes, Isle of Wight, and launched on 16 April 1919. She was completed on 23 December 1919 and was commissioned into service the same day with the pennant number D66.

== Service history ==
=== Before World War II ===
After entering service with the fleet in 1919, Wivern was assigned to the 3rd Destroyer Flotilla, serving with that flotilla in the Atlantic Fleet and Mediterranean Fleet before being decommissioned, transferred to the Reserve Fleet, and placed in reserve.

In 1939, Wivern was recommissioned as the fleet mobilised because of deteriorating diplomatic relations between the United Kingdom and Nazi Germany and was selected for assignment to the 16th Destroyer Flotilla based at Portsmouth in the event of war breaking out.

=== World War II ===
==== 1939 ====
After the United Kingdom entered World War II on 3 September 1939, Wivern's assignment at Portsmouth was cancelled, and instead she was assigned to Western Approaches Command for convoy defence operations in the Western Approaches. On 5 September, she escorted Convoy GC 1 from the River Clyde in Scotland with the destroyers HMS Vanessa, Vivacious, and Wakeful. On 9 September she joined the destroyers HMS Walker and Winchelsea in escorting Convoy OB 2.

In October 1939, Wivern was transferred to the 16th Destroyer Flotilla under Commander-in-Chief, The Nore at Harwich for convoy escort and patrol duty in the North Sea. After the destroyer HMS Gipsy detonated a magnetic mine off Harwich and sank at 51°57′00″N 001°19′00″E on the evening of 21 November 1939, Wivern steamed through the area at high speed on 22 November in an attempt to detonate any other mines in the area and clear the area for ship traffic.

Wivern continued her North Sea operations without further major incident through the end of 1939 and into 1940.

==== 1940 ====
Wivern remained on convoy and patrol duty in the North Sea until May 1940, the month in which her pennant number was changed to I66. On 10 May, as the German invasion of the Netherlands, Belgium, Luxembourg, and France began, she was ordered to join the destroyer HMS Wild Swan in Operation XD, consisting of demolition operations at Hook of Holland to prevent German forces from capturing important installations there intact. Accordingly, Wivern and Wild Swan went to Hook of Holland on 11 May, where Wivern took aboard the British diplomatic mission to the Netherlands for passage to Vlissingen. On 13 May, Wivern took part in Operation Ordnance, the evacuation of Allied personnel from Hook of Holland as German ground forces advanced through the Netherlands, suffering damage on 14 May during the operation. She then entered a dockyard in the United Kingdom for repairs.

After completion of repairs, Wivern returned to service with her flotilla at Harwich in July 1940 to continue her convoy and patrol duties in the North Sea. On 11 July 1940 she was attacked by German aircraft off Suffolk while escorting Convoy FN 19 near Aldeburgh Light, but she avoided damage by manoeuvering. As the threat of a German invasion of the United Kingdom grew, her duties included anti-invasion patrols, and on 3 August 1940 Wivern, Wild Swan, the light cruiser HMS Cardiff, the destroyers Venomous and Verity, and the patrol vessels Puffin, Shearwater, and Sheldrake patrolled together. On 7 September 1940 Wivern and Wild Swan took part in Operation Rival, screening Cardiff and the light cruiser HMS Aurora as they patrolled off the coast of the Netherlands.

After Operation Rival, Wivern was transferred to Western Approaches Command with Wild Swan, the destroyer leader HMS Malcolm, and the destroyer HMS Veteran to serve in the 5th Escort Group, based at Liverpool, for convoy escort work in the North Atlantic Ocean. She carried out these duties for the rest of 1940 without major incident.

==== 1941 ====
Wivern remained on convoy escort duty in the North Atlantic through the early weeks of 1941. On 26 February 1941, she deployed to escort ships of the 20th Destroyer Flotilla during Operation JH, a minelaying operation in the English Channel off Cape D'Antifer, France. She returned to her convoy duties after the conclusion of the operation.

In May 1941, Wivern, Wild Swan, and the destroyer HMS Vansittart deployed to Portsmouth. On 12 May, Wivern, Wild Swan, and the escort destroyers HMS Berkeley and Blencathra escorted the heavy cruiser HMS Berwick, which was undergoing a refit, and was moved from Portsmouth to Rosyth, Scotland, to avoid German air raids. On 14 May Wivern and Wild Swan escorted the Free French Forces Surcouf on the first leg of Surcouf's transatlantic voyage, separating from the submarine to return to the United Kingdom on reaching 49°54′00″N 004°27′00″W.

On 17 May 1941 the Royal Navy assigned Wivern to escort the military convoy WS 8X from the Clyde to Freetown, Sierra Leone, and to remain at Freetown after arrival to conduct convoy escort operations from there, but after the German battleship Bismarck sank the British battlecruiser HMS Hood in the Battle of the Denmark Strait on 24 May and broke out into the open Atlantic accompanied by the German cruiser Prinz Eugen, the convoy's departure and Wivern's reassignment were postponed. Wivern instead was retained for duty in the Western Approaches pending developments related to the hunt for Bismarck and took passage with Vansittart and Wild Swan to Portsmouth to await further orders. Heavy units of the Home Fleet sank Bismarck in the North Atlantic on 27 May, and on 30 May the three destroyers returned to the Clyde. On 31 May, they set out from the Clyde as escorts for WS 8X along with the rest of the convoy's local escort, which also included the destroyers HMS Brighton, Legion, St. Marys and Sherwood, and the Royal Canadian Navy destroyer HMCS Saguenay. On 3 June 1941, Wivern and the other ships of the local escort detached from WS 8X to return to the Clyde, leaving the convoy's protection to its ocean escort, which consisted of the aircraft carrier HMS Victorious, the heavy cruiser HMS Norfolk, the light cruiser HMS Neptune, and the armed merchant cruiser HMS Esperance Bay.

On 18 June 1941, Wivern once again was assigned to convoy escort duty at Freetown along with Vansittart and Wild Swan, and the three destroyers steamed there that month to report for duty. From 10 to 13 July 1941, Wivern, Wild Swan, the destroyer Brilliant, and the corvette Asphodel reinforced the ocean escort – made up of the light cruiser HMS Galatea and armed merchant cruiser HMS Moreton Bay – of the military convoy WS 9B during the final leg of its voyage to Freetown.

On 3 August 1941, Wivern departed Freetown bound for Gibraltar, where she entered the Royal Navy Dockyard for a refit. Upon its completion in September 1941, she was based at Gibraltar for Atlantic convoy escort operations, which she continued for the rest of 1941 without major incident.

==== 1942 ====
Wivern remained on Atlantic convoy duty based at Gibraltar until 9 February 1942, when she departed Gibraltar with Wild Swan, the destroyers HMS Boreas, Bradford, Vidette and Wishart, and the sloops Folkestone, Rochester, Scarborough, Wellington and Weston as the escort of Convoy SL 100 for its voyage to Freetown. Upon arriving at Freetown, she continued convoy escort duty based there.

In March 1942, the civil community of West Hartlepool in County Durham "adopted" Wivern in a Warship Week national savings campaign. On 3 May 1942, she departed Freetown with Boreas, the heavy cruiser Frobisher, the light cruiser Gambia, the seaplane carrier Albatross, the escort destroyer Tetcott, and the Royal Netherlands Navy destroyer HNLMS Van Galen as the escort for Convoy WS 18, detaching with Boreas on 4 May to return to Freetown. On 30 June 1942, Wivern, Boreas, and the destroyer HMS Velox joined Convoy WS 20 at sea to reinforce its escort – consisting of Brilliant, the destroyer HMS Vimy, and the escort destroyer HMS Blackmore – and remained with the convoy until it arrived at Freetown on 2 July 1942.

Wivern remained on escort duty at Freetown until October 1942, when she proceeded to Gibraltar with orders to support Operation Torch, the upcoming Allied amphibious landings in French Morocco and French Algeria scheduled for November 1942. In November, she began escorting convoys in the western Mediterranean, and on 10 November 1942 she was escorting Convoy TE 3 when she took part with Verity, the destroyer Westcott, and the corvettes Lotus and Starwort in a depth-charge attack on the German submarine U-660 in the Mediterranean off Oran, Algeria, after U-660 attacked the convoy; Lotus and Starwort were credited with sinking the submarine on 12 November 1942 at 36°07′00″N 001°00′00″W.

Wivern continued on convoy escort duty based at Gibraltar through the end of 1942 and into 1943.

==== 1943 ====
Wivern was still based at Gibraltar on western Mediterranean convoy escort duty on 22 February 1943, when she came to the assistance of the Royal Canadian Navy corvette HMCS Weyburn, which had struck a German mine and was sinking east of Gibraltar off Cape Espartel and was sinking at 35°46′00″N 006°02′00″W with the loss of her commanding officer and 12 other members of her crew. While rescuing Weyburn's survivors, Wivern suffered severe structural damage either from the detonation of another mine or when depth charges aboard Weyburn exploded as she sank.

In March 1943, Wivern was towed to the United Kingdom for repairs, and in April 1943 she was decommissioned at Plymouth and entered the Royal Navy Dockyard there for extensive repairs – including to her propulsion plant, which the explosion had lifted off its mountings – and a refit that included the replacement of her forward 4.7-inch (120-mm) with a twin 6-pounder British Army gun for use against motor torpedo boats. She was in dockyard hands for the next 20 months.

==== 1944-1945 ====
With her repairs and refit finally complete, Wivern underwent post-refit acceptance trials in September 1944 and recommissioned that month for assignment back to the Nore for service with the Harwich Escort Force. In October 1944, she took up her duties at Harwich, which were focused on nightly patrols to counter the operations of German motor torpedo boats – S-boats, known to the Allies as "E-boats" – in the North Sea. In November 1944, she began escort duty for North Sea convoys during their voyages between the Thames Estuary and Rosyth.

In January 1945, Wivern was escorting a convoy when she suffered structural damage during a Force 12 gale. She underwent repairs at the Royal Navy Dockyard at Rosyth and returned to duty in February 1945.

Wivern was part of the escort of Convoy FS 56 on its voyage from Rosyth to the Thames Estuary on 14 March 1945 when the German submarine U-714 attacked, torpedoing and sinking the Danish cargo ship Magne off St. Abbs, Scotland, near the Firth of Forth. As Wivern rescued Magne's survivors, the South African Navy frigate HMSAS Natal, a new ship that had left the River Tyne only four hours earlier bound for Scapa Flow in the Orkney Islands and then for antisubmarine warfare training at Tobermory on the Isle of Mull, arrived on the scene to assist. Natal detected a submerged submarine with her ASDIC equipment, which was more modern and advanced than that on Wivern. Natal attacked, firing two Squid anti-submarine mortar salvos of six depth bombs each. After the second attack, Natal lost ASDIC contact with U-714 and oil and a metal tank rose to the surface at 55°57′00″N 001°57′00″W. Natal then proceeded to Scapa Flow.

A Royal Navy antisubmarine hunter-killer group led by the frigate HMS Ascension arrived and depth-charged the position, bringing more flotsam from the submarine to the surface. Wivern, however, claimed a share of the kill after depth-charging an oil slick 10 nautical miles (19 km) to the south under the assumption that it was oil from U-714, which Wivern's crew believed had been only been damaged by Natal and was attempting to escape. Although some controversy surrounds credit for the sinking, naval authorities determined that Natal had sunk U-714 with the loss of the submarine's entire crew of 50 men and gave Natal sole credit.

Wivern continued her convoy escort duties in the North Sea until the surrender of Germany in early May 1945. She then deployed to support Allied reoccupation forces in Norway and to transport Allied personnel.

== Decommissioning and disposal ==
Wivern was decommissioned and laid up at Rosyth later in the summer of 1945, and by October 1945 she no longer appeared on the Royal Navy's active list. Later placed on the disposal list, she was sold to Metal Industries on 18 February 1947 for scrapping. She was towed to the breaker's yard at Charlestown, Fife, Scotland, in October 1948.

== Bibliography ==
- Campbell, John (1985). Naval Weapons of World War II. Annapolis, Maryland: Naval Institute Press. ISBN 0-87021-459-4.
- Chesneau, Roger, ed. (1980). Conway's All the World's Fighting Ships 1922–1946. Greenwich, UK: Conway Maritime Press. ISBN 0-85177-146-7.
- Colledge, J. J.; Warlow, Ben (2006) [1969]. Ships of the Royal Navy: The Complete Record of All Fighting Ships of the Royal Navy from the 15th Century to the Present (3rd Rev ed.). London: Chatham Publishing. ISBN 978-1-86176-281-8. OCLC 67375475.
- Cocker, Maurice. Destroyers of the Royal Navy, 1893–1981. Ian Allan. ISBN 0-7110-1075-7.
- Friedman, Norman (2009). British Destroyers From Earliest Days to the Second World War. Annapolis, Maryland: Naval Institute Press. ISBN 978-1-59114-081-8.
- Gardiner, Robert & Gray, Randal, eds. (1985). Conway's All the World's Fighting Ships 1906–1921. Annapolis, Maryland: Naval Institute Press. ISBN 0-85177-245-5.
- Lenton, H. T. (1998). British & Empire Warships of the Second World War. Annapolis, Maryland: Naval Institute Press. ISBN 1-55750-048-7.
- March, Edgar J. (1966). British Destroyers: A History of Development, 1892–1953; Drawn by Admiralty Permission From Official Records & Returns, Ships' Covers & Building Plans. London: Seeley Service. OCLC 164893555.
- Preston, Antony (1971). 'V & W' Class Destroyers 1917–1945. London: Macdonald. OCLC 464542895.
- Raven, Alan & Roberts, John (1979). 'V' and 'W' Class Destroyers. Man o'War. Vol. 2. London: Arms & Armour. ISBN 0-85368-233-X.
- Rohwer, Jürgen (2005). Chronology of the War at Sea 1939–1945: The Naval History of World War Two (Third Revised ed.). Annapolis, Maryland: Naval Institute Press. ISBN 1-59114-119-2.
- Whinney, Bob (2000). The U-boat Peril: A Fight for Survival. Cassell. ISBN 0-304-35132-6.
- Whitley, M. J. (1988). Destroyers of World War 2. Annapolis, Maryland: Naval Institute Press. ISBN 0-87021-326-1.
- Winser, John de D. (1999). B.E.F. Ships Before, At and After Dunkirk. Gravesend, Kent: World Ship Society. ISBN 0-905617-91-6.
