= List of ship launches in 1936 =

The list of ship launches in 1936 includes a chronological list of some ships launched in 1936.

| Date | Ship | Class | Builder | Location | Country | Notes |
|---|---|---|---|---|---|---|
| 9 January | Eulota | Tanker | Wilton-Fijenoord | Schiedam | Netherlands | For Bataafsche Petroleum Maatschappij 9,100 tons capacity |
| 9 January | Ramdas | Passenger steamer | Harland and Wolff | Belfast | United Kingdom | For Indian Co-operative Navigation and Trading Company Ltd. |
| 9 January | Standella | Tanker | Harland & Wolff | Belfast | United Kingdom | For Anglo-Saxon Petroleum Co. |
| 11 January | Sydney Star | Refrigerated cargo ship | Harland & Wolff | Belfast | United Kingdom | For Blue Star Line. |
| 22 January | Hopestar | Cargo ship | Swan Hunter & Wigham Richardson | Newcastle upon Tyne | United Kingdom | For Wallsend Shipping Co Ltd. |
| 22 January | Aberdeen | Grimsby-class sloop | Devonport Dockyard | Plymouth | United Kingdom | |
| 24 January | Hostile | H-class destroyer | Scotts Shipbuilding & Engineering Company | Greenock, Scotland | United Kingdom | |
| 25 January | Dunnottar Castle | Passenger ship | Harland and Wolff | Belfast | United Kingdom | For Union-Castle Line |
| January | CNCS Narval | Tank barge | Alabama Drydock and Shipbuilding Company | Mobile, Alabama | United States | For CN San Cristobal SA. |
| 20 February | Simnia | Tanker | Harland & Wolff | Belfast | United Kingdom | For Anglo-Saxon Petroleum Co. |
| 21 February | Yamakaze | Shiratsuyu-class destroyer | Uraga Dock Company | Uraga | Japan | For Imperial Japanese Navy. |
| 25 February | Hunter | H-class destroyer | Swan Hunter | Wallsend | United Kingdom | |
| 10 March | Hereward | H-class destroyer | Vickers Armstrong | Walker, Newcastle-on-Tyne | United Kingdom | |
| 10 March | Hero | H-class destroyer | Vickers Armstrong | Walker, Newcastle-on-Tyne | United Kingdom | |
| 10 March | Royal Ulsterman | Ferry | Harland & Wolff | Belfast | United Kingdom | For Burns & Laird Line. |
| 11 March | Royal Scotsman | Ferry | Harland & Wolff | Belfast | United Kingdom | For Burns & Laird Line. |
| 23 March | Hotspur | H-class destroyer | Scotts | Greenock | United Kingdom | |
| 24 March | Stockholm | Göteborg-class destroyer | Karlskrona dockyard | Karlskrona | Sweden | |
| 24 March | Paul Jacobi | Type 1934A-class destroyer | Deschimag | Bremen | Germany | |
| 24 March | Fleetwood | Grimsby-class sloop | Devonport Dockyard | Plymouth | United Kingdom | |
| 26 March | Drayton | Mahan-class destroyer | Bath Iron Works | Bath, Maine | United States | |
| 26 March | Dunvegan Castle | Passenger ship | Harland & Wolff | Belfast | United Kingdom | For Union-Castle Line. |
| 26 March | Mallard | Kingfisher-class sloop | Alexander Stephen and Sons | Linthouse, Glasgow | United Kingdom | |
| 27 March | Wolfgang Zenker | Type 1934A-class destroyer | Germaniawerft | Kiel | Germany | |
| 28 March | Swan | Grimsby-class sloop | Cockatoo Island Dockyard | Sydney | Australia | |
| 4 April | Yorktown | Yorktown-class aircraft carrier | Newport News Shipbuilding | Newport News, Virginia | United States | |
| 7 April | Hardy | H-class destroyer | Cammell Laird | Birkenhead | United Kingdom | |
| 8 April | Hyperion | H-class destroyer | Swan Hunter | Wallsend | United Kingdom | |
| 22 April | Theodor Riedel | Type 1934A-class destroyer | Deschimag | Bremen | Germany | |
| 24 April | Miralda | Tanker | Nederlandse Scheepsbouw Maatschappij. | Amsterdam | Netherlands | For N.V. Petroleum Maatschappij La Corona. |
| 25 April | Elusa | Tanker | Wilton-Fijenoord | Schiedam | Netherlands | For Bataafsche Petroleum Maatschappij 9,100 tons capacity |
| 5 May | Adelong | Cargo ship | Harland & Wolff | Belfast | United Kingdom | For Huddart Parker. |
| 5 May | Hasty | H-class destroyer | Denny | Dumbarton | United Kingdom | |
| 5 May | Puffin | Kingfisher-class sloop | Alexander Stephen and Sons | Linthouse, Glasgow | United Kingdom | |
| 7 May | Sleipner | Sleipner-class destroyer | Royal Norwegian Navy Yard | Horten | Norway | |
| 13 May | Leonora | Tug | Harland & Wolff | Belfast | United Kingdom | For McKie & Baxter Ltd. |
| 14 May | Hans Lody | Type 1934A-class destroyer | Germaniawerft | Kiel | Germany | |
| 21 May | Vincennes | New Orleans-class cruiser | Fore River Shipyard | Quincy, Massachusetts | United States | |
| 22 May | Ostmark | Light seaplane tender | Howaldtswerke | Kiel | Germany | For civilian use, later taken over by the military |
| 27 May | Charles Maciver | Trawler | Harland & Wolff | Belfast | United Kingdom | For Lancashire Sea Fisheries. |
| 3 June | Campbell | Treasury-class cutter | Philadelphia Naval Shipyard | Philadelphia, Pennsylvania | United States | |
| 3 June | Duane | Treasury-class cutter | Philadelphia Naval Shipyard | Philadelphia, Pennsylvania | United States | |
| 3 June | Ingham | Treasury-class cutter | Philadelphia Naval Shipyard | Philadelphia, Pennsylvania | United States | |
| 3 June | Roger B. Taney | Treasury-class cutter | Philadelphia Naval Shipyard | Philadelphia, Pennsylvania | United States | |
| 13 June | Horst Wessel | Gorch Fock-class barque | Blohm & Voss | Hamburg | Germany | For Reichsmarine |
| 17 June | Lamson | Mahan-class destroyer | Bath Iron Works | Bath, Maine | United States | |
| 21 June | Yūdachi | Shiratsuyu-class destroyer | Sasebo Naval Arsenal | Sasebo | Japan | For Imperial Japanese Navy. |
| 27 June | Jupiter | Fishing trawler | Schulte & Bruns | Emden | Germany | For Dollart Heringfischerei AG. |
| 29 June | Oldenburg | Cargo ship | Deutsche Werft | Hamburg | Germany | For Oldenburg Portugiesische Dampschiffs Rhederei. |
| June | Iroquois | Tank barge | Alabama Drydock and Shipbuilding Company | Mobile, Alabama | United States | For Gulf Oil Corp. |
| June | Onondaga | Tank barge | Alabama Drydock and Shipbuilding Company | Mobile, Alabama | United States | For Gulf Oil Corp. |
| 7 July | Havock | H-class destroyer | Denny | Dumbarton | United Kingdom | |
| 8 July | Bernd von Arnim | Type 1934A-class destroyer | Germaniawerft | Kiel | Germany | |
| 14 July | Dipavati | Ferry | Harland & Wolff | Belfast | United Kingdom | For Bombay Steam Navigation Co. |
| 16 July | Hermann Schoemann | Type 1934A-class destroyer | Deschimag | Bremen | Germany | |
| 16 July | Pretoria | Ocean liner | Blohm & Voss | Hamburg | Germany | For Deutsche Ost-Afrika Linie |
| 21 July | Lairdswood | Livestock carrier | Harland & Wolff | Belfast | United Kingdom | For Burns & Laird Line. |
| 6 August | Lairdscrest | Livestock carrier | Harland & Wolff | Belfast | United Kingdom | For Burns & Laird Line. |
| 22 August | Dr. Adolf Spilker | Fishing vessel | Schiffbau-Gesellschaft Unterweser AG | Wesermünde | Germany | For F. Busse |
| 25 August | Duchess of Abercorn | Ferry | Harland & Wolff | Belfast | United Kingdom | For Belfast Harbour Commissioners. |
| 25 August | Æger | Sleipner-class destroyer | Royal Norwegian Navy Yard | Horten | Norway | |
| 3 September | Lairdsbank | Livestock carrier | Harland & Wolff | Belfast | United Kingdom | For Burns & Laird Line. |
| 15 September | Bruno Heinemann | Type 1934A-class destroyer | Deschimag | Bremen | Germany | |
| 16 September | British Power | Tanker | Harland & Wolff | Govan | United Kingdom | For British Tanker Company. |
| 17 September | Walmer Castle | Cargo ship | Harland & Wolff | Belfast | United Kingdom | For Union-Castle Line. |
| 24 September | Erich Steinbrinck | Type 1934A-class destroyer | Blohm & Voss | Hamburg | Germany | |
| September | CNSC 262 | Tank barge | Alabama Drydock and Shipbuilding Company | Mobile, Alabama | United States | For CN San Cristobal SA. |
| September | CNSC 263 | Tank barge | Alabama Drydock and Shipbuilding Company | Mobile, Alabama | United States | For CN San Cristobal SA. |
| September | CNSC 264 | Tank barge | Alabama Drydock and Shipbuilding Company | Mobile, Alabama | United States | For CN San Cristobal SA. |
| September | CNSC 265 | Tank barge | Alabama Drydock and Shipbuilding Company | Mobile, Alabama | United States | For CN San Cristobal SA. |
| September | CNSC 266 | Tank barge | Alabama Drydock and Shipbuilding Company | Mobile, Alabama | United States | For CN San Cristobal SA. |
| September | CNSC 267 | Tank barge | Alabama Drydock and Shipbuilding Company | Mobile, Alabama | United States | For CN San Cristobal SA. |
| 3 October | Scharnhorst | Scharnhorst-class battleship | Kriegsmarinewerft | Wilhelmshaven | Germany | |
| 3 October | Enterprise | Yorktown-class aircraft carrier | Newport News Shipbuilding | Newport News, Virginia | United States | |
| 6 October | Crossgar | Collier | Harland & Wolff | Belfast | United Kingdom | For John Kelly Ltd. |
| 15 October | Inglefield | I-class destroyer | Cammell Laird | Birkenhead | United Kingdom | |
| 30 October | Imogen | I-class destroyer | Hawthorn Leslie | Tyneside | United Kingdom | |
| 1 November | Kawakaze | Shiratsuyu-class destroyer | Fujinagata Shipyard | Osaka | Japan | For Imperial Japanese Navy. |
| 3 November | British Destiny | Tanker | Harland & Wolff | Govan | United Kingdom | For British Tanker Company. |
| 7 November | Eulima | Tanker | Wilton-Fijenoord | Schiedam | Netherlands | For Bataafsche Petroleum Maatschappij 9,100 tons capacity |
| 12 November | Isis | I-class destroyer | Yarrow | Glasgow | United Kingdom | |
| 17 November | Ernebank | Cargo ship | Harland & Wolff | Belfast | United Kingdom | For Bank Line. |
| 17 November | Philadelphia | Brooklyn-class cruiser | Philadelphia Navy Yard | Philadelphia, Pennsylvania | United States | |
| 23 November | Hans Loh | Fishing trawler | Deutsche Schiff- und Maschinenbau | Wesermünde | Germany | For Grundmann & Gröschel |
| 26 November | Volta | Mogador-class destroyer | At. & Ch. de Bretagne | Nantes | France | For French Navy. |
| 26 November | Icarus | I-class destroyer | John Brown & Company | Clydebank | United Kingdom | |
| 27 November | Umikaze | Shiratsuyu-class destroyer | Maizuru Naval Arsenal | Maizuru | Japan | For Imperial Japanese Navy. |
| 30 November | Kittiwake | Kingfisher-class sloop | John I. Thornycroft & Company | Woolston, Southampton | United Kingdom | |
| 30 November | Brooklyn | Brooklyn-class cruiser | New York Navy Yard | Brooklyn, New York | United States | |
| 2 December | Cameo | Coaster | Harland & Wolff | Belfast | United Kingdom | For William Robertson Ltd. |
| 3 December | Boise | Brooklyn-class cruiser | Newport News Shipbuilding & Dry Dock Company | Newport News, Virginia | United States | |
| 8 December | Gneisenau | Scharnhorst-class battleship | Deutsche Werke | Kiel | Germany | |
| 11 December | Imperial | I-class destroyer | Hawthorn Leslie | Tyneside | United Kingdom | |
| 12 December | Strasbourg | Dunkerque-class battleship | Ateliers et Chantiers de la Loire | Saint-Nazaire | France | |
| 17 December | Intrepid | I-class destroyer | J. Samuel White | Cowes | United Kingdom | |
| 19 December | Sama | Cargo ship | Lindholmens Varv | Gothenburg | Sweden | For Chr. Gundersen & Co. |
| 29 December | Sitala | Tanker | Harland & Wolff | Belfast | United Kingdom | For Anglo-Saxon Petroleum Co. |
| Date unknown | A.G.T. No. 28 | Tank barge | Alabama Drydock and Shipbuilding Company | Mobile, Alabama | United States | For A. G. Thomas. |
| Date unknown | A.G.T. No. 30 | Tank barge | Alabama Drydock and Shipbuilding Company | Mobile, Alabama | United States | For A. G. Thomas. |
| Date unknown | Chester | Towboat | Alabama Drydock and Shipbuilding Company | Mobile, Alabama | United States | For United States Army Corps of Engineers. |
| December | CNSC Ballena | Tank barge | Alabama Drydock and Shipbuilding Company | Mobile, Alabama | United States | For CN San Cristobal SA. |
| December | CNSC Bonito | Tank barge | Alabama Drydock and Shipbuilding Company | Mobile, Alabama | United States | For CN San Cristobal SA. |
| Date unknown | CNSC 260 | Tank barge | Alabama Drydock and Shipbuilding Company | Mobile, Alabama | United States | For CN San Cristobal SA. |
| Date unknown | CNSC 261 | Tank barge | Alabama Drydock and Shipbuilding Company | Mobile, Alabama | United States | For CN San Cristobal SA. |
| Date unknown | Dr Colijn | Coaster | Noord Nederland Scheepsmakkerij | Groningen | Netherlands | For M Oosterhuis |
| Date unknown | Eilbek | Cargo ship | Lübecker Maschinenbau Gesellschaft | Lübeck | Germany | For Knohr & Burchard. |
| Date unknown | Heinrich Schmidt | Cargo ship | Flensburger Schiffbau-Gesellschaft | Flensburg | Germany | For Flensburger Schiffsparten-Vereinigung AG |
| Date unknown | Hempstead No. 2 | Tank barge | Alabama Drydock and Shipbuilding Company | Mobile, Alabama | United States | For Warrior Mobile Gulf Towing. |
| Date unknown | Icemaid | Icemaid type collier | S. P. Austin & Sons Ltd. | Sunderland | United Kingdom | For the Gas, Light & Coke Co. Ltd. |
| Date unknown | Hermann Anderson | Tanker | Lübecker Flenderwerke AG. | Lübeck | Germany | For C. Anderson. |
| Date unknown | Nordcoke | Cargo ship | Lübecker Flenderwerke AG | Lübeck | Germany | For F Krupp AG |
| Date unknown | Paul Harneit | tanker | F. Schichau. | Danzig | (Free City of Danzig) Danzig | For Deutsche-Amerikanische Petroleum. |
| Date unknown | Poel | Coastal tanker | Danziger Werft AG | Danzig | (Free City of Danzig) Danzig | For Kriegsmarine. |
| Date unknown | Seydlitz | Fishing trawler | Seebeckwerft | Bremerhaven | Germany | For F. A. Pust Hochseefischerei AG |
| Date unknown | Shepco 10 | Tank barge | Alabama Drydock and Shipbuilding Company | Mobile, Alabama | United States | For Shell Producers Co. |
| Date unknown | Skylark 10 | Motor vessel | J. Bolson & Son Ltd. | Poole | United Kingdom | For J. Bolson & Son Ltd. |
| Date unknown | Southern Pride | Whaler | Smith's Dock Co. Ltd. | Middlesbrough | United Kingdom | For Southern Whaling & Sealing Co. Ltd. |
| Date unknown | Thalia | Cargo ship | Nordseewerke | Emden | Germany | For Dampfschiffahrts-Gesellschaft Neptun |
| Date unknown | Titlark | Motor vessel | J. Bolson & Son Ltd. | Poole | United Kingdom | For J. Bolson & Son Ltd. |
| Date unknown | Titlark I | Motor vessel | J. Bolson & Son Ltd. | Poole | United Kingdom | For J. Bolson & Son Ltd. |
| Date unknown | No. 54 | Barge | Alabama Drydock and Shipbuilding Company | Mobile, Alabama | United States | For United States Army Corps of Engineers. |
| Date unknown | No. 97 | Tank barge | Alabama Drydock and Shipbuilding Company | Mobile, Alabama | United States | For Q. D. Ainsley. |
| Date unknown | 3 unnamed vessels | Barges | Alabama Drydock and Shipbuilding Company | Mobile, Alabama | United States | For private owners. |
