= HMS Mallard =

Four ships of the Royal Navy have borne the name HMS Mallard, after the species of duck, the Mallard:

- HMS Mallard (1801) was a 12-gun gun-brig launched in 1801. The French captured her after she ran aground in 1804. The French Navy converted her to a gunboat in 1811, renamed her Favori in 1814, Mallard in 1815, and then Favori again later in 1815. She was struck at Brest in 1827, but was a service craft there on 17 September 1831.
- HMS Mallard (1875) was a Forester-class composite screw gunboat launched in 1875 and sold in 1889.
- HMS Mallard (1896) was a torpedo boat destroyer launched in 1896. She was reclassified as a D-class destroyer in 1913 and was sold in 1920.
- HMS Mallard (L42) was a Kingfisher-class sloop launched in 1936 and sold in 1947.
