= HMS Grafton (H89) =

British G-class destroyer

Coordinates: 51°24′N 2°49′E

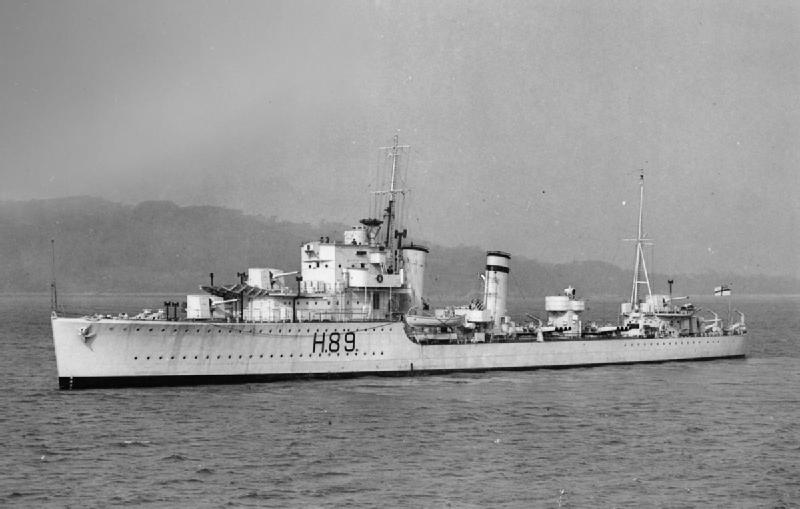
- Grafton

History

United Kingdom
- Name: Grafton
- Ordered: 5 March 1934
- Builder: John I. Thornycroft & Company, Woolston
- Laid down: 30 August 1934
- Launched: 18 September 1935
- Commissioned: 20 March 1936
- Identification: Pennant number: H89
- Motto: Decus pretutis pretium: 'Glory is the reward of valour'
- Fate: Torpedoed and scuttled, 29 May 1940
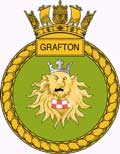
- Badge: On a Field Green, a Lion's mask Gold, crowned Silver, with collar red and silver

General characteristics (as built)
- Class & type: G-class destroyer
- Displacement: 1,350 long tons (1,370 t) (standard); 1,883 long tons (1,913 t) (deep load)
- Length: 323 ft (98.5 m)
- Beam: 33 ft (10.1 m)
- Draught: 12 ft 5 in (3.8 m)
- Installed power: 3 Admiralty 3-drum boilers; 34,000 shp (25,000 kW)
- Propulsion: 2 shafts, 2 geared steam turbines
- Speed: 36 knots (67 km/h; 41 mph)
- Range: 5,530 nmi (10,240 km; 6,360 mi) at 15 knots (28 km/h; 17 mph)
- Complement: 137 (peacetime), 146 (wartime)
- Armament: 4 × single 4.7 in (120 mm) guns; 2 × quadruple 0.5 in (12.7 mm) machine guns; 2 × quadruple 21 in (533 mm) torpedo tubes; 20 × depth charges, 1 rail and 2 throwers

HMS Grafton (H89) was a G-class destroyer built for the Royal Navy during the mid-1930s. During the Spanish Civil War of 1936–1939 the ship spent considerable time in Spanish waters, enforcing the non-intervention measures agreed by Britain and France. After the beginning of World War II she was transferred from the Mediterranean Fleet to Great Britain for escort and contraband inspection duties. Grafton was refitting when the Norwegian Campaign began in April 1940, but the ship escorted convoys to Norway once her refit was completed. She evacuated British troops from the Dunkirk bridgehead in May, but was sunk by a German submarine after she stopped to rescue survivors from another British destroyer.

== Description ==
Grafton displaced 1,350 long tons (1,370 t) at standard load and 1,883 long tons (1,913 t) at deep load. The ship had an overall length of 323 feet (98.5 m), a beam of 33 feet (10.1 m) and a draught of 12 feet 5 inches (3.8 m). She was powered by Parsons geared steam turbines, driving two shafts which developed a total of 34,000 shaft horsepower (25,000 kW) and gave a maximum speed of 36 knots (67 km/h; 41 mph). Steam for the turbines was provided by three Admiralty 3-drum boilers. Grafton carried a maximum of 470 long tons (480 t) of fuel oil that gave her a range of 5,530 nautical miles (10,240 km; 6,360 mi) at 15 knots (28 km/h; 17 mph). The ship's complement was 137 officers and ratings in peacetime, but in increased to 146 in wartime.

The ship mounted four 45-calibre 4.7-inch (120 mm) Mark IX guns in single mounts. For anti-aircraft defence Grafton had two quadruple Mark I mounts for the 0.5 inch (12.7 mm) Vickers Mark III machine gun. She was fitted with two above-water quadruple torpedo tube mounts for 21-inch (533 mm) torpedoes. One depth charge rail and two throwers were fitted; 20 depth charges were originally carried, but this increased to 35 shortly after the war began.

== Service ==
Grafton was laid down by John I. Thornycroft & Company, at Woolston, Hampshire on 30 August 1934, launched on 18 September 1935 and completed on 20 March 1936. Excluding government-furnished equipment like the armament, the ship cost £248,485. (Note: Adjusted for inflation to 2026 pounds, £15,375,926.) Aside from a brief period when she was assigned to the 20th Destroyer Flotilla after her commissioning, Grafton spent the prewar period assigned to the 1st Destroyer Flotilla with the Mediterranean Fleet. Between 10 August and 9 September 1936, together with Glowworm, she escorted the yacht Nahlin as King Edward VIII cruised the eastern Mediterranean. Afterwards Grafton patrolled Spanish waters during the Spanish Civil War enforcing the policies of the Non-Intervention Committee. The ship was refitting in Malta when World War II began in September 1939.

Grafton and three of her sisters were transferred to the Western Approaches Command at Plymouth in October. The following month, however, the ship was reassigned at the end of the month to the 22nd Destroyer Flotilla in Harwich of the Nore Command for patrol and escort duties. On 10 January 1940, she was transferred to the reconstituted 1st Destroyer Flotilla, also based at Harwich, where Grafton inspected ships travelling between German and Dutch ports for contraband. Between 26 March and 14 April the ship was given a brief overhaul in Hull in the shipyard of Brigham and Cowan. As the Norwegian Campaign had begun while Grafton was refitting, she was reassigned to the Home Fleet where she escorted convoys to Norway until 11 May.

=== Operation Dynamo ===
During the Siege of Calais, Grafton escorted the light cruisers Arethusa and Galatea as they provided naval gunfire support for the 30th Motor Brigade on 26 May. The following day she evacuated over 1,600 troops from the beaches of La Panne and Bray, northeast of Dunkirk. On the morning of 29 May, she stopped to rescue survivors from the destroyer Wakeful, which had been torpedoed and sunk earlier that morning by the German E-boat S-30. While rescuing survivors from Wakeful off Nieuwpoort, Belgium, Grafton was struck in the stern by a torpedo from the German submarine U-62. This seriously damaged the ship, and also triggered a secondary explosion which damaged the bridge, killing the captain and another officer. Thirteen ratings and the canteen manager were also killed. The ship's back was broken, but she remained afloat long enough for all survivors to be rescued by the destroyer Ivanhoe and the transport Malines. Ivanhoe sank Grafton with naval gunfire, as she was too badly damaged to be towed to safety.
