= HMS Kingfisher (L70) =

Sloop of the Royal Navy

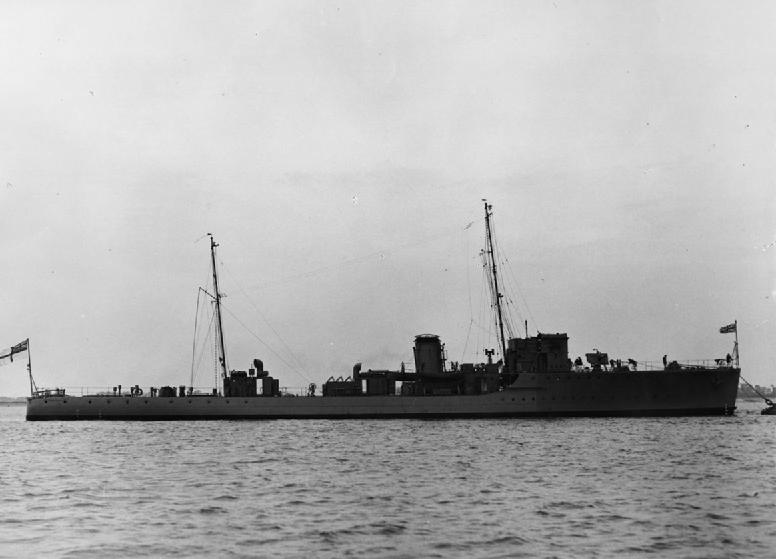

History

United Kingdom
- Name: Kingfisher
- Builder: Fairfield Shipbuilding and Engineering Company, Govan
- Laid down: 1 June 1934
- Launched: 14 February 1935
- Commissioned: 18 June 1935
- Fate: Sold, 21 April 1947

General characteristics
- Class & type: Kingfisher-class sloop
- Displacement: 510 long tons (518 t) standard; 680 long tons (691 t) full load
- Length: 234 ft (71 m) p/p; 243 ft 3 in (74.14 m) o/a
- Beam: 26 ft 6 in (8.08 m)
- Draught: 6 ft (1.8 m)
- Propulsion: 2 × Admiralty 3-drum water-tube boilers; Parsons geared steam turbines; 3,600 shp (2,685 kW); 2 shafts; 160 tons oil
- Speed: 20 knots (37 km/h; 23 mph)
- Complement: 60
- Armament: As designed; 1 × QF 4-inch (101.6 mm) Mark V gun, 40 Depth charges

HMS Kingfisher (L70) (later K70) was a Royal Navy patrol vessel and the lead ship of the Kingfisher-class sloops, laid down in 1934 and commissioned in 1935. She took part in the Dunkirk evacuation, and spent much of the Second World War as an experimental trials ship. She was sold for scrap in 1947.

== Construction and design ==
HMS Kingfisher was ordered by the British Admiralty on 15 December 1933, as the lead ship of a new class of Coastal Sloops. The Kingfishers were intended as coastal escorts, suitable for replacing the old ships used for fishery protection and anti-submarine warfare training in peacetime, while being suitable for mass production in wartime. Kingfisher was 234 feet 0 inches (71.32 m) long between perpendiculars and 243 feet 2 inches (74.12 m) overall, with a Beam of 26 feet 6 inches (8.08 m) and a draught of 7 feet 3 inches (2.21 m). Displacement was 510 long tons (518 t) standard and 740 long tons (752 t) full load. Two Admiralty 3-drum water-tube boilers fed Parsons geared steam turbines rated at 3,600 shaft horsepower (2,700 kW), giving a speed of 20 knots (37 km/h; 23 mph). Main gun armament was a single QF 4-inch (102 mm) Mk V gun on a low angle mount. This was considered adequate for dealing with a surfaced submarine. Eight Lewis guns comprised the ship's anti-aircraft armament. Anti-submarine armament was relatively heavy for the time, with a load of 40 depth charges, launched by two depth charge throwers and two depth charge chutes, with Type 124 Sonar fitted in a retracting dome. The ship had a crew of 60 officers and men.

Kingfisher was laid down at Fairfield's Govan shipyard on 1 June 1934 and was launched (without ceremony) on 14 February 1935. She was completed on 18 June 1935.

== Service ==
In 1939 Kingfisher, based at Portland Harbour as part of the 1st Anti-Submarine Flotilla, was fitted with an experimental depth-finding sonar. On 9 August 1939, the ship took part in a review of the Reserve Fleet at Weymouth by King George VI.

On 8 December 1939, Kingfisher and the old sloop PC-74 collided at Eglinton, Northern Ireland, with both ships sustaining slight damage, Kingfisher was back on duty on 10 December, investigating a possible submarine contact by the destroyer Forester. On 26 May 1940, Operation Dynamo, the evacuation of the trapped British Expeditionary Force from Dunkirk. Kingfisher made two evacuation runs on 31 May and two more on 1 June, when she was damaged by near misses from German bombing attacks. On the night of 3/4 June 1940, a final effort was made by all available ships to evacuate as many as possible of the remaining troops (by that time mainly French) at Dunkirk. Kingfisher took part in that final evacuation mission, but collided with the French trawler Edmund Rene outside Dunkirk harbour, tearing a hole in the sloop's bow. Kingfisher was under repair until July 1940, the experimental sonar installation being removed. Kingfisher was damaged again by German bombing in Portland harbour on 14 August 1940.

Kingfisher continued in use as an experimental anti-submarine ship, based on the Clyde and later at Ardrossan. In September 1944, Kingfisher carried out a series of Sonar trials against the submarine Seraph, which had been modified with a streamlined hull and higher power to give greater submerged speed, in order to simulate the behaviour of the German Type XXI or similar submarines. From December 1944 to April 1945, Kingfisher was used for trials of an experimental Beam forming sonar, that was eventually developed into the Type 170 attack sonar used to control the Limbo anti-submarine mortar.

In 1945 Kingfisher was replaced in the sonar development role by the frigate Helmsdale. She was sold for scrap on 21 April 1947.

In 1999, John Cockerill, a Redditch-based baker, made a 6 ft-long cake in the shape of the ship to celebrate a visit from Queen Elizabeth II to the Kingfisher Shopping Centre.

== Bibliography ==
- Brown, David K. (2007). Atlantic Escorts: Ships, Weapons & Tactics in World War II. Barnsley, UK: Seaforth Publishing. ISBN 978-1-84415-702-0.
- Campbell, N. J. M. (1980). "Great Britain (including Empire Forces)". In Chesneau, Roger (ed.). Conway's All the World's Fighting Ships 1922–1946. Greenwich, UK: Conway Maritime Press. pp. 2–85. ISBN 0-85177-146-7.
- Friedman, Norman (2008). British Destroyers & Frigates: The Second World War and After. Barnsley, UK: Seaforth Publishing. ISBN 978-1-84832-015-4.
- Lenton, H. T.; Colledge, J. J. (1973). Warships of World War II (Second ed.). Shepperton, UK: Ian Allan. ISBN 0-7110-0403-X.
- Llewellyn-Jones, Malcolm (2006). The Royal Navy and Anti-Submarine Warfare, 1917–49. Abingdon, UK: Routledge. ISBN 0-415-38532-6.
- Rohwer, Jürgen; Hümmelchen, Gerhard (1992). Chronology of the War at Sea 1939–1945. London: Greenhill Books. ISBN 1-85367-117-7.
- Winser, John de S. (1999). B.E.F. Ships before, at and after Dunkirk. Gravesend, UK: World Ship Society. ISBN 0-905617-91-6.
