= HMS Wakeful (H88) =

Destroyer of the Royal Navy

Coordinates: 51.3789°N 2.7228°E

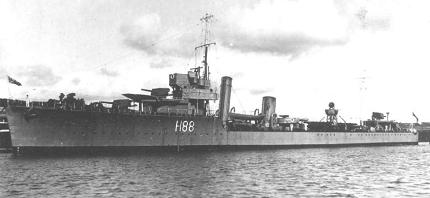

History

United Kingdom
- Name: HMS Wakeful
- Ordered: 9 December 1916
- Builder: John Brown & Company, Clydebank
- Laid down: 17 January 1917
- Launched: 6 October 1917
- Commissioned: 16 December 1917
- Identification: Pennant number: H88
- Motto: Si dormiam capiar; "If I sleep I may be caught"
- Fate: Sunk on 29 May 1940 by E-Boat S-30
- Badge: On a Black field an eye proper with rays ensuing therefore, Gold.

General characteristics
- Class & type: Admiralty W-class destroyer
- Displacement: 1,100 tons
- Length: 300 ft (91.4 m) o/a, 312 ft (95.1 m)p/p
- Beam: 26 ft 9 in (8.2 m)
- Draught: 9 ft (2.7 m) standard, 11 ft 3 in (3.4 m) in deep
- Propulsion: 3 Yarrow type Water-tube boilers; Brown-Curtis steam turbines; 2 shafts; 27,000 shp (20,000 kW)
- Speed: 34 knots (63 km/h; 39 mph)
- Range: 320-370 tons oil, 3,500 nmi (6,500 km) at 15 knots (28 km/h; 17 mph), 900 nmi (1,700 km) at 32 knots (59 km/h; 37 mph)
- Complement: 110
- Armament: 4 × QF 4 in Mk.V (102mm L/45), mount P Mk.I; 2 × QF 2 pdr Mk.II "pom-pom" (40 mm L/39) or; 1 × QF 3 inch 20 cwt (76 mm), mount HA Mk.II; 6 (2x3) tubes for 21 in torpedoes

HMS Wakeful was a W-class destroyer of the Royal Navy, built under the 1916–1917 Programme in the 10th Destroyer order. Wakeful was assigned to the Grand Fleet after completion, and served into the early years of the Second World War. Wakeful was torpedoed and sunk during Operation Dynamo by a German E-Boat on 29 May 1940.

== Career ==
=== First World War ===
Wakeful joined the Grand Fleet and was present at the surrender of the German High Seas Fleet in 1918. She then went into reserve.

=== Second World War ===
Just prior to the start of the war in August 1939 Wakeful was reactivated and recommissioned to attend the Royal Review of the Reserve Fleet in Weymouth Bay. At the outbreak of war Wakeful was assigned to convoy escort duty with the 17th Destroyer Flotilla, which was part of the Western Approaches Command.

=== Operation Dynamo ===
Wakeful was selected to support Operation Dynamo, the evacuation of allied troops from Dunkirk, on 26 May 1940. On 27 May 1940 Wakeful embarked 631 Allied troops. While returning them to Dover Wakeful came under air attack and received minor damage below the waterline. Despite the near miss Wakeful returned to Dunkirk to continue the evacuation, embarking 640 Allied troops on 28 May 1940. While carrying this out Wakeful was torpedoed by the German E-Boat S-30. The destroyer was struck by two torpedoes, one hitting the forward boiler room. Casualties were heavy, only five of the 640 Allied troops – Captain Brian Leslie Lynch Abdy Collins Royal Engineers, Sapper Michael Frazer of the Royal Engineers, Mr Stanley Patrick of the Royal Army Service Corps and Mr H.F.R. Ruddell of the Royal Army Service Corps and Mr James 'Jim' Kane of the Royal Tank Regiment plus 25 of Wakeful's crew survived. A number of ships stopped to pick up the survivors, but one of these, the destroyer Grafton, was then in turn sunk by a German U-boat.

== Wreck ==
The wreck is a designated War Grave, lying at a depth of 24 metres (79 ft) in busy waters along the approaches to Zeebrugge harbour at 51° 22'N, 2° 43'E. Permission is needed from Belgian Nautical Authority to dive on the site. In 2003, work was done to remove parts of the superstructure and funnel that were considered to be a potential danger to navigation; the recovered ship's crest and foot plate are now placed in the National Museum of the Royal Navy.

== Bibliography ==
- Campbell, John (1985). Naval Weapons of World War II. Annapolis, Maryland: Naval Institute Press. ISBN 0-87021-459-4.
- Chesneau, Roger, ed. (1980). Conway's All the World's Fighting Ships 1922–1946. Greenwich, UK: Conway Maritime Press. ISBN 0-85177-146-7.
- Colledge, J. J.; Warlow, Ben (2006) [1969]. Ships of the Royal Navy: The Complete Record of All Fighting Ships of the Royal Navy from the 15th Century to the Present (3rd Rev ed.). London: Chatham Publishing. ISBN 978-1-86176-281-8. OCLC 67375475.
- Cocker, Maurice (1981). Destroyers of the Royal Navy, 1893–1981. Ian Allan. ISBN 0-7110-1075-7.
- Friedman, Norman (2009). British Destroyers From Earliest Days to the Second World War. Annapolis, Maryland: Naval Institute Press. ISBN 978-1-59114-081-8.
- Gardiner, Robert & Gray, Randal, eds. (1985). Conway's All the World's Fighting Ships 1906–1921. Annapolis, Maryland: Naval Institute Press. ISBN 0-85177-245-5.
- Lenton, H. T. (1998). British & Empire Warships of the Second World War. Annapolis, Maryland: Naval Institute Press. ISBN 1-55750-048-7.
- March, Edgar J. (1966). British Destroyers: A History of Development, 1892–1953; Drawn by Admiralty Permission From Official Records & Returns, Ships' Covers & Building Plans. London: Seeley Service. OCLC 164893555.
- Preston, Antony (1971). 'V & W' Class Destroyers 1917–1945. London: Macdonald. OCLC 464542895.
- Raven, Alan & Roberts, John (1979). 'V' and 'W' Class Destroyers. Man o'War. Vol. 2. London: Arms & Armour. ISBN 0-85368-233-X.
- Rohwer, Jürgen (2005). Chronology of the War at Sea 1939–1945: The Naval History of World War Two (Third Revised ed.). Annapolis, Maryland: Naval Institute Press. ISBN 1-59114-119-2.
- Whinney, Bob (2000). The U-boat Peril: A Fight for Survival. Cassell. ISBN 0-304-35132-6.
- Whitley, M. J. (1988). Destroyers of World War 2. Annapolis, Maryland: Naval Institute Press. ISBN 0-87021-326-1.
- Winser, John de D. (1999). B.E.F. Ships Before, At and After Dunkirk. Gravesend, Kent: World Ship Society. ISBN 0-905617-91-6.
