= HMS Puffin =

Sloop of the Royal Navy

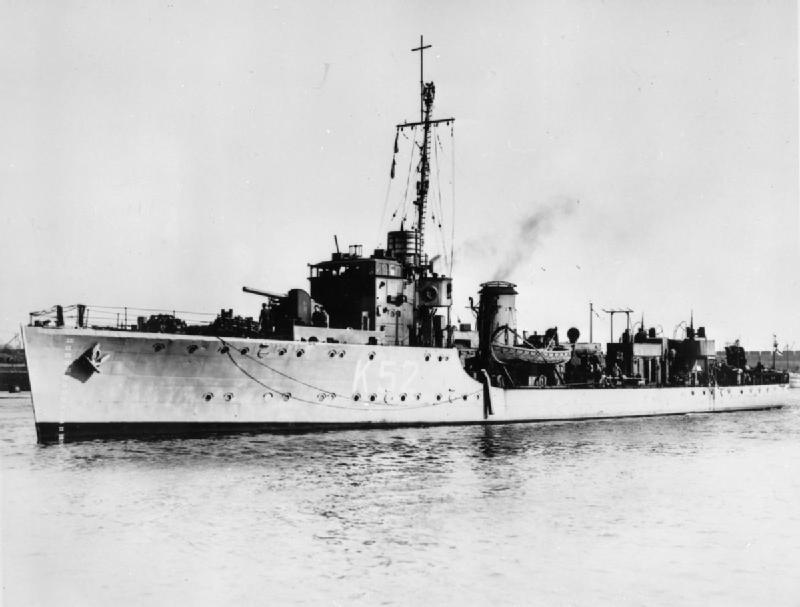
- Puffin in March 1943

History

United Kingdom
- Name: HMS Puffin (L52)
- Namesake: Atlantic puffin
- Builder: Alexander Stephens and Sons, Linthouse, Glasgow
- Laid down: 12 June 1935
- Launched: 5 May 1936
- Commissioned: 6 August 1936
- Decommissioned: 26 March 1945
- Fate: Sold for scrapping, 1947

General characteristics
- Class & type: Kingfisher-class sloop
- Displacement: 510 long tons (518 t) standard; 680 long tons (691 t) full
- Length: 234 ft (71 m) p/p; 243 ft 3 in (74.14 m) o/a
- Beam: 26 ft 6 in (8.08 m)
- Draught: 6 ft (1.8 m)
- Propulsion: 2 × Admiralty 3-drum water-tube boilers; Parsons geared steam turbines; 3,600 shp (2,685 kW); 2 shafts; 160 tons oil
- Speed: 20 knots (37 km/h; 23 mph)
- Complement: 60
- Armament: 1 × QF 4-inch (100 mm) Mark V L/45 gun, mount P Mk.I; Depth charges

HMS Puffin (L52) (later K52), was a Kingfisher-class sloop of the British Royal Navy, built in the 1930s, that saw service during World War II. The ship was laid down on 12 June 1935 by Alexander Stephens and Sons, based at Linthouse in Glasgow, launched on 5 May 1936, and commissioned on 6 August 1936.

== Armament ==
On the outbreak of war, Puffin, like the rest of her class, was rapidly up-gunned. First a multiple Vickers machine gun was mounted on the quarterdeck, and two single 20 mm Oerlikon guns, added as they became available, on single pedestal mounts on the deckhouse aft, with the machine gun being replaced later with a further pair of such weapons. As it became available the Centimetric Radar Type 271 was added - a target indication set capable of picking up the conning tower or even the periscope or snorkel of a submarine. Radar Type 286 air warning was added at the masthead.

== Service history ==
On 25 October 1939 the German submarine U-16 was sunk in the English Channel near Dover by depth charges from Puffin and the ASW trawler HMT Cayton Wyke.

On 19 May 1940 Puffin along with a group of six trawlers and two destroyers took part in "Operation Quixote", cutting commercial cables from the UK to Europe off the coast of Norfolk.

On 26 March 1945 Puffin under the command of Lt.Cdr. A.S. Miller, RNZNVR, rammed and sank a German Seehund midget submarine off Lowestoft. The impact caused the U-boat's torpedoes to explode and Puffin was so badly damaged that she was written off as constructive total loss, and finally sold for scrapping in 1947.

== Bibliography ==
- Campbell, N. J. M. (1980). "Great Britain (including Empire Forces)". In Chesneau, Roger (ed.). Conway's All the World's Fighting Ships 1922–1946. Greenwich, UK: Conway Maritime Press. pp. 2–85. ISBN 0-85177-146-7.
- Colledge, J. J.; Warlow, Ben & Bush, Steve (2020). Ships of the Royal Navy: The Complete Record of all Fighting Ships of the Royal Navy from the 15th Century to the Present (5th revised and updated ed.). Barnsley, UK: Seaforth Publishing. ISBN 978-1-5267-9327-0.
- Hague, Arnold (1993). Sloops: A History of the 71 Sloops Built in Britain and Australia for the British, Australian and Indian Navies 1926–1946. Kendal, UK: World Ship Society. ISBN 0-905617-67-3.
- Lenton, H. T. (1998). British & Empire Warships of the Second World War. Annapolis, Maryland: Naval Institute Press. ISBN 1-55750-048-7.
