= HMS Mallard (L42) =

Sloop of the Royal Navy

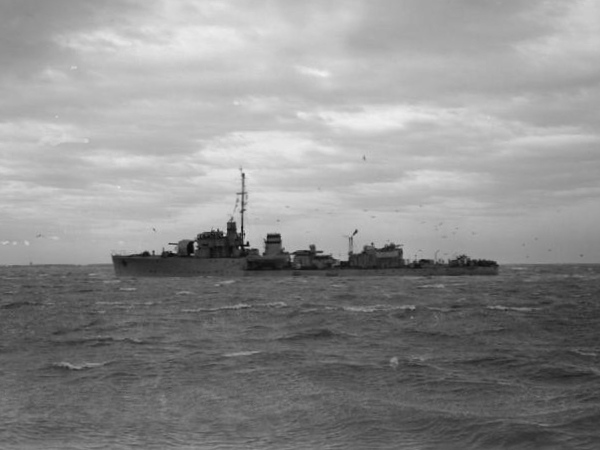
- HMS Mallard in 1944

History

United Kingdom
- Name: HMS Mallard
- Ordered: 21 March 1935
- Builder: Alexander Stephen and Sons, Linthouse
- Laid down: 12 June 1935
- Launched: 26 March 1936
- Commissioned: 15 July 1936
- Fate: Sold for scrap on 21 April 1947

General characteristics
- Class & type: Kingfisher-class sloop
- Displacement: 510 long tons (518 t) standard; 680 long tons (691 t) full load
- Length: 234 ft (71 m) p/p; 243 ft 3 in (74.14 m) o/a
- Beam: 26 ft 6 in (8.08 m)
- Draught: 6 ft (1.8 m)
- Propulsion: 2 × Admiralty 3-drum water-tube boilers; Parsons geared steam turbines; 3,600 shp (2,685 kW); 2 shafts; 160 tons oil
- Speed: 20 knots (37 km/h; 23 mph)
- Complement: 60
- Armament: As designed; 1 × QF 4-inch (101.6 mm) Mark V gun, 40 Depth charges

HMS Mallard was a Kingfisher-class sloop of the British Royal Navy. Completed in 1936, Mallard served through the Second World War, carrying out convoy escort operations off the east coast of the British Isles. She was sold for scrap in 1947.

== Construction and design ==
HMS Mallard was one of two Kingfisher-class sloops ordered by the British Admiralty on 21 March 1935. The Kingfishers were intended as coastal escorts, suitable for replacing the old ships used for fishery protection and anti-submarine warfare training in peacetime, while being suitable for mass production in wartime. Mallard was 234 feet 0 inches (71.32 m) long between perpendiculars and 243 feet 2 inches (74.12 m) overall, with a Beam of 26 feet 6 inches (8.08 m) and a draught of 7 feet 3 inches (2.21 m). Displacement was 510 long tons (518 t) standard and 740 long tons (752 t) full load. Two Admiralty 3-drum water-tube boilers fed Parsons geared steam turbines rated at 3,600 shaft horsepower (2,700 kW), giving a speed of 20 knots (37 km/h; 23 mph).

Main gun armament was a single QF 4-inch (102 mm) Mk V gun on a low angle mount. This was considered adequate for dealing with a surfaced submarine. Eight Lewis guns comprised the ship's anti-aircraft armament. Anti-submarine armament was relatively heavy for the time, with a load of 40 depth charges, launched by two depth charge throwers and two depth charge chutes, with Type 124 sonar fitted in a retracting dome. The ship had a crew of 60 officers and men.

Mallard was laid down at Alexander Stephen and Sons' Linthouse, Glasgow shipyard on 12 June 1935, was launched on 26 March 1936, and commissioned at Devonport on 15 July 1936.

== Service ==
In 1939 Mallard was based at Portland Harbour as part of the 1st Anti-Submarine Flotilla, On 9 August 1939, the ship took part in a review of the Reserve Fleet at Weymouth by King George VI. On the outbreak of the Second World War in September 1939, she joined Western Approaches Command, operating out of Milford Haven, but soon transferred to the Nore Command for operations out of Dover. In November 1939, Mallard joined the First Anti-Submarine Striking Force, based in Belfast, and on 4 December she made an unsuccessful attack on a suspected German submarine in Liverpool Bay.

In January 1940, the First Anti-Submarine Striking Force, including Mallard, transferred to Harwich, carrying out anti-submarine patrols in the North Sea. On 7 February Mallard collided with sister ship Pintail off Harwich, and was under repair at Lowestoft until 22 February. On 6 March she was attacked unsuccessfully by a German bomber, but the next day she was damaged in a collision of Harwich, and was under repair in London until 27 April. On the night of 24/25 May 1940 Mallard formed part of the escort for two blockships, Florentino and Transea, which were to be used to block Zeebrugge harbour. The attempt failed, with one blockship running aground and the other being scuttled in the wrong place, and so was repeated on the night of 26/27 May, again with Mallard as part of the escort. This time the two blockships, Atlantic Guide and Borodino, were scuttled in the correct place, blocking the entrance to Zeebrugge harbour. Operation Dynamo, the evacuation of British and Allied troops from Dunkirk had begun on 26 May, and on 28 May Mallard carried out anti-submarine patrols in support of the evacuation. She again operated off Dunkirk on 1–2 May, escorting the anti-aircraft cruiser Calcutta.

She became increasingly involved in escorting convoys on Britain's east coast, and on 3 August rescued the survivors from the merchant ship Wychwood which had been sunk by a mine. On the night of 22/23 September 1940, Mallard and sister ship Sheldrake were escorting the destroyers Intrepid, Icarus and Impulsive on a minelaying operation off the Dutch coast when the two sloops came under heavy attack by German E-boats, forcing the operation to be aborted, although it was successfully carried out the next night. On 30 September she was attacked by a low-flying bomber near the Kentish Knock lightship, with two bombs near missing her and one striking the ship's engine room, knocking out Mallard's engines and causing heavy flooding. She was out of action for nine months following this attack. (Note: Some sources state that Mallard was mined rather than bombed on 30 September 1940.)

On 15 September 1941, the tanker Pontfield struck a mine off East Anglia and broke in two. The bow section of the ship sank, while the stern section stayed afloat and was towed to Great Yarmouth for repair with Mallard acting as escort. On 7 December 1941, the cargo ship Welsh Prince was sunk by a mine off Spurn Point. Mallard rescued all 49 of Welsh Prince's crew. On 12 May 1943 Mallard claimed a German Dornier bomber shot down. On the night of 14/15 February 1944 Mallard and sister ship Shearwater engaged and pursued six E-boats that had laid mines off Great Yarmouth.

Mallard remained in full service, operating on patrols in the North Sea through the rest of the war in Europe, going into reserve at Harwich in June 1945. She was sold for scrap on 21 April 1947.

== Pennant numbers ==
Pennant number	From	To
L42	1936	1940
K42	1940	1945

== Bibliography ==
- Brown, David K. (2007). Atlantic Escorts: Ships, Weapons & Tactics in World War II. Barnsley, UK: Seaforth Publishing. ISBN 978-1-84415-702-0.
- Campbell, N. J. M. (1980). "Great Britain (including Empire Forces)". In Chesneau, Roger (ed.). Conway's All the World's Fighting Ships 1922–1946. Greenwich, UK: Conway Maritime Press. pp. 2–85. ISBN 0-85177-146-7.
- Elliot, Peter (1977). Allied Escort Ships of World War II: A Complete Survey. London: Macdonald & Jane's. ISBN 0-356-08401-9.
- Friedman, Norman (2008). British Destroyers & Frigates: The Second World War and After. Barnsley, UK: Seaforth Publishing. ISBN 978-1-84832-015-4.
- H.M. Ships Damaged or Sunk by Enemy Action: 3rd. SEPT. 1939 to 2nd. SEPT. 1945 (PDF). Admiralty. 1952. Archived from the original (PDF) on 10 June 2016.
- Lenton, H. T.; Colledge, J. J. (1973). Warships of World War II. Shepperton, UK: Ian Allan. ISBN 0-7110-0403-X.
- Rohwer, Jürgen; Hümmelchen, Gerhard (1992). Chronology of the War at Sea 1939–1945. London: Greenhill Books. ISBN 1-85367-117-7.
- Winser, John de S. (1999). B.E.F. Ships before, at and after Dunkirk. Gravesend, UK: World Ship Society. ISBN 0-905617-91-6.
