= Kingfisher-class sloop =

1935 class of British sloops-of-war

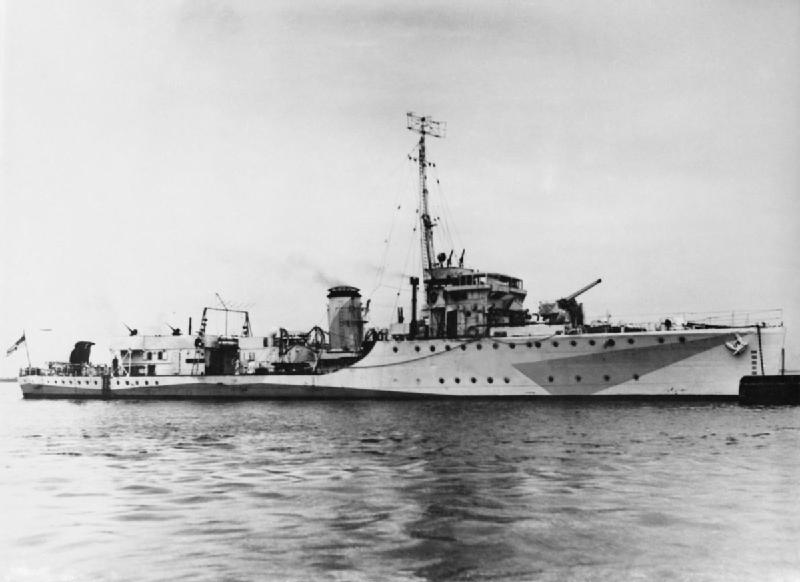
- Shearwater

Class overview
- Operators: Royal Navy
- Preceded by: Grimsby class
- Succeeded by: Bittern class
- Built: 1934–1939
- In commission: 1935–1950
- Completed: 9
- Lost: 1

General characteristics
- Type: Sloop-of-war
- Displacement: Kingfisher group; 510 long tons (518 t) (standard); Kittiwake group; 530 long tons (539 t) (standard); Shearwater group; 580 long tons (589 t) (standard)
- Length: 243 ft 3 in (74.1 m) o/a
- Beam: 26 ft 6 in (8.1 m)
- Draught: Kingfisher group; 6 ft (1.8 m); Kittiwake group; 6 ft 3 in (1.9 m); Shearwater group; 6 ft 6 in (2.0 m)
- Installed power: 2 shafts; 2 geared steam turbines
- Propulsion: 2 × Admiralty 3-drum boilers; 3,600 shp (2,685 kW)
- Speed: 20 knots (37 km/h; 23 mph)
- Complement: 60
- Sensors & processing systems: ASDIC
- Armament: As designed; Kingfisher group; 1 × single 4 in (102 mm) gun; Depth charges; Kittiwake group; 1 × single 4 in gun; Depth charges; Shearwater group; 1 × single 4 in gun; 1 × quadruple 0.5 in (12.7-mm) machine guns; Depth charges

The Kingfisher class was a class of nine patrol sloops of the British Royal Navy built in three groups of three each during the 1930s, that saw service during World War II, mainly on East Coast convoys in the North Sea.

== Design ==
The Kingfisher class was an attempt to build a patrol vessel under 600 tons, due to the lack of clauses on vessels this size in the London Naval Treaty of 1930. It was intended it would escort coastal shipping in wartime. Its small size and short range that this entailed (it was based on a scaled-down destroyer) rendered it unsuitable for open ocean work. The design had a number of shortcomings. Constructed to full naval warship specifications and powered by geared steam turbine engines, it was designed to too high a standard and were unsuitable for mass production. The ships were armed with one 4-inch gun forward and depth charges aft, which severely limited their ability to defend themselves, let alone their charges.

=== Wartime modifications ===
The woeful lack of defensive armament was addressed early in the war by adding a multiple Vickers machine gun on the quarterdeck in the Kingfisher and Kittiwake groups, as per the Shearwaters. As they became available, two 20 mm Oerlikon cannons were added, on pedestal mounts on the deckhouse aft. Two additional 20 mm cannons were added later to replace the multiple machine gun.

Centimetric Radar Type 271 was added on the roof of the bridge as it became available, this was a target indication set capable of picking up the conning tower or even the periscope or snorkel of a submarine. Radar Type 286 air warning was added at the masthead on most ships. The ships that had the Mark V gun on the open mounting HA Mark III had a shield added to give the gun crews a measure of protection on the exposed fo'c'sle.

== Ships ==
The first ship, Kingfisher, was ordered under the 1933 Programme on 15 December 1933 and built by the Fairfield Shipbuilding and Engineering Company. The next pair of ships were part of the six sloops of the 1934 Programme and ordered from Alexander Stephen and Sons on 21 March 1935. Kittiwake and Sheldrake were ordered on 21 January 1936 from John I. Thornycroft & Company under the 1935 Programme while Widgeon was ordered on 13 January 1937 from Yarrow Shipbuilders. A further three ships were ordered on 6 April 1938 with Shearwater built by J. Samuel White and Company and the other two built by William Denny and Brothers. Unlike the earlier vessels, these three ships were built with a quadruple 0.5-inch machine gun and featured a high-angle 4 inch gun capable of attacking aircraft.

Name	Builder	Laid down	Launched	Commissioned	Fate	Refs
Kingfisher group
Kingfisher	Fairfield, Govan	1 June 1934	14 February 1935	18 June 1935	Sold for scrapping 21 April 1947	
Mallard	Stephens, Linthouse	12 June 1935	26 March 1936	15 July 1936	Sold for scrapping 21 April 1947	
Puffin	Stephens, Linthouse	12 June 1935	5 May 1935	26 August 1936	Damaged after ramming and sinking a German Seehund midget submarine on 26 March 1945 and declared a total loss. Sold for scrapping 16 January 1947	
Kittiwake group
Kittiwake	Thornycroft, Woolston	7 April 1936	30 November 1936	24 April 1937	Sold into mercantile service as Tuch Shing on 30 September 1946	
Sheldrake	Thornycroft, Woolston	21 June 1936	28 January 1937	1 July 1937	Sold into mercantile service as Tuch Loon on 12 August 1946	
Widgeon	Yarrow, Scotstoun	8 March 1937	2 February 1938	16 June 1938	Sold for scrapping on 21 April 1947	
Shearwater group
Shearwater	Whites, Cowes	15 August 1938	18 April 1939	7 September 1939	Sold for scrapping on 21 April 1947	
Guillemot	Denny, Dumbarton	22 August 1938	6 July 1939	28 October 1939	Sold for scrapping on 6 June 1950	
Pintail	Denny, Dumbarton	23 August 1938	18 August 1939	28 November 1939	Sunk off the Humber by an acoustic mine on 10 June 1941	

== In fiction ==
Nicholas Monsarrat, the author of The Cruel Sea, served in two Kingfisher-class sloops: HMS Guillemot in 1942 as First Lieutenant, and HMS Shearwater in 1943 as Captain, after they had been reclassified as corvettes. HMS Dipper and HMS Winger were the fictional names he gave to these Kingfisher class corvettes in his stories East Coast Corvette (1943) and Corvette Command (1944), written during the war when security included ship's names.

== Bibliography ==
- Campbell, N. J. M. (1980). "Great Britain (including Empire Forces)". In Chesneau, Roger (ed.). Conway's All the World's Fighting Ships 1922–1946. Conway Maritime Press. pp. 2–85. ISBN 0-85177-146-7.
- Friedman, Norman (2008). British Destroyers & Frigates: The Second World War and After. Seaforth Publishing. ISBN 978-1-84832-015-4.
- Hague, Arnold (1993). Sloops: A History of the 71 Sloops Built in Britain and Australia for the British, Australian and Indian Navies 1926–1946. World Ship Society. ISBN 0-905617-67-3.
- Lenton, H. T. (1998). British & Empire Warships of the Second World War. Naval Institute Press. ISBN 1-55750-048-7.
