= HMS Shearwater (L39) =

Sloop of the Royal Navy

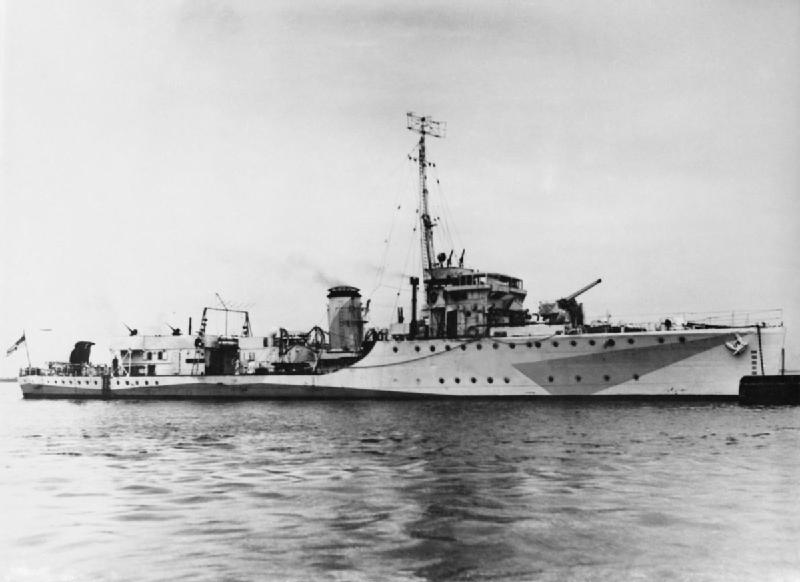
- HMS Shearwater

History

United Kingdom
- Name: Shearwater
- Builder: J. Samuel White, Cowes
- Laid down: 15 August 1938
- Launched: 18 April 1939
- Commissioned: 7 September 1939
- Identification: Pennant number L39 (later K39)
- Fate: Sold for scrapping on 21 April 1947

General characteristics
- Class & type: Kingfisher-class sloop
- Displacement: 580 long tons (590 t); 750 long tons (760 t) (full)
- Length: 234 ft (71 m)
- Beam: 26 ft 6 in (8.08 m)
- Draught: 6 ft 6 in (1.98 m)
- Propulsion: 2 × Admiralty 3-drum water-tube boilers; Parsons geared steam turbines; Two shafts; 3,600 shp (2,700 kW)
- Speed: 20 knots (37 km/h; 23 mph)
- Range: 160 long tons (160 t) oil
- Complement: 60
- Armament: 1 × QF 4-inch (100 mm) Mark V L/45 gun; 4 × QF .5 in Mark III Vickers machine guns

HMS Shearwater was a Kingfisher-class sloop of the Royal Navy. Shearwater was laid down at J. Samuel White, Cowes on 15 August 1938. She was launched on 18 April 1939 and commissioned on 7 September 1939. She served during the Second World War and was adopted by Farnborough Urban District Council during Warship Week in 1942. Her anti-aircraft armament was augmented during the war, with the addition of two single 20mm Oerlikon cannon atop the aft shelter. She survived the war and sold for scrapping on 21 April 1947. She was broken up by Stockton Ship & Salvage Company.

She was the fictional HMS Winger in Nicholas Monsarrat's book 'Corvette Command' of the Three Corvettes series. This vessel was also the first sloop to be commanded by an RNVR officer from June 1944 until July 1945, Desmond Henry Cope, DSC(1943).

== Bibliography ==
- Colledge, J. J.; Warlow, Ben & Bush, Steve (2020). Ships of the Royal Navy: The Complete Record of all Fighting Ships of the Royal Navy from the 15th Century to the Present (5th revised ed.). Barnsley: Seaforth Publishing. ISBN 978-1-5267-9327-0.
- Hague, Arnold (1993). Sloops: A History of the 71 Sloops Built in Britain and Australia for the British, Australian and Indian Navies 1926–1946. Kendal: World Ship Society. ISBN 0-905617-67-3.
- Lenton, H. T. (1998). British & Empire Warships of the Second World War. Annapolis, Maryland: Naval Institute Press. ISBN 1-55750-048-7.
- Monsarrat, Nicholas (1944). Corvette Command. London: Cassell. OCLC 1221423663.
- Rohwer, Jürgen (2005). Chronology of the War at Sea 1939–1945: The Naval History of World War Two (Third Revised ed.). Annapolis, Maryland: Naval Institute Press. ISBN 1-59114-119-2.
