= List of shipwrecks in June 1941 =

The list of shipwrecks in June 1941 includes ships sunk, foundered, grounded, or otherwise lost during June 1941.

== 1 June ==
List of shipwrecks: 1 June 1941
Ship	State	Description
Alfred Jones	United Kingdom	World War II: The cargo ship (5,013 GRT) on a trip from Liverpool for Freetown with a cargo of planes and trucks, was torpedoed and sunk in the Atlantic Ocean 140 nautical miles (260 km) west south west of Freetown, Sierra Leone (approximately 8°N 15°W) by U-107 (Kriegsmarine) with the loss of fourteen crew. The 62 survivors were rescued by HMS Marguerite (Royal Navy).
HMS Calcutta	Royal Navy	World War II: The C-class cruiser was bombed and sunk in the Mediterranean Sea 100 nautical miles (190 km) off Alexandria, Egypt by Junkers Ju 88 aircraft of the Luftwaffe.
Exportador I	Portugal	World War II: The fishing trawler (318 GRT) was shelled and sunk in the Atlantic Ocean 137 nautical miles (254 km) south west of Cape St. Vincent (35°40′N 10°30′W) by Guglielmo Marconi (Regia Marina) with the loss of two of her 22 crew.
Scottish Monarch	United Kingdom	World War II: The cargo ship (4,719 GRT) on a trip from Tyne for Freetown with a cargo of coal, was torpedoed and sunk in the Atlantic Ocean southwest of the Cape Verde Islands (12°58′N 27°20′W by U-105 (Kriegsmarine) with the loss of one of her 45 crew. Survivors were rescued by Alphard (Netherlands) and Christine Marie (United Kingdom).
San Marco	Italy	World War II: The cargo ship (3,076 GRT) was torpedoed and sunk in the Mediterranean Sea 5 nautical miles (9.3 km) due east of Cabo Carbonara, Sardinia by HMS Clyde (Royal Navy). Eight crew were killed and seven wounded.

== 2 June ==
List of shipwrecks: 2 June 1941
Ship	State	Description
Beaumanoir	United Kingdom	World War II: The 2,328 GRT cargo ship on a trip from Blyth for London with a cargo of coal, was bombed and sunk off Robin Hood's Bay by Junkers Ju 88 bomber of 506 Küstenfliegergruppe, Luftwaffe. Her 30 crew survived.
Kastelholm	Finland	World War II: The cargo ship struck a mine and sank in the Atlantic Ocean with the loss of one of her 38 crew.
HMT Kos XXII	Royal Navy	World War II: The requisitioned 353 GRT whaler was bombed and sunk in the eastern Mediterranean Sea south of Crete, Greece, by Luftwaffe Junkers Ju 87 bombers.
HMS LCT 16	Royal Navy	World War II: The landing craft tank was bombed and sunk by Luftwaffe aircraft off Cania, Crete.
Michael E	United Kingdom	World War II: The CAM ship was torpedoed and sunk in the North Atlantic by U-108 (Kriegsmarine) with the loss of four of her 51 crew. Survivors were rescued by Alcinous (Netherlands). Michael E was on her maiden voyage.
Prince Rupert City	United Kingdom	World War II: Convoy EC26: The cargo ship (4,749 GRT) on a passage from Hull for Nova Scotia in ballast, was bombed and damaged during the night in the Atlantic Ocean (58°46′30″N 4°41′30″W) by Luftwaffe aircraft with the loss of four crew. 43 crew and the 2 passengers were saved. She continued to drift and sank during the day about 5 miles north east of Cape Wrath.
U-147	Kriegsmarine	World War II: The Type IID submarine was sunk in the Atlantic Ocean off the coast of Ireland (56°38′N 10°24′W) by HMS Periwinkle and HMS Wanderer (both Royal Navy) with the loss of all 26 crew.

== 3 June ==
List of shipwrecks: 3 June 1941
Ship	State	Description
Arsia	Italy	World War II: The cargo ship (736 GRT) was torpedoed and cut in two in the port of Lampedusa by HMS Unique (Royal Navy). Her eleven crew survived, but the ship was a total loss.
Beatrice C.	Italy	World War II: The cargo ship (6,132 GRT) was bombed and set on fire in the Mediterranean Sea 20 nautical miles (37 km) north east of the Kerkennah Islands, Tunisia by Bristol Blenheim aircraft of the Royal Air Force. Her whole crew abandonned ship and survived. She was then sunk by gunfire of Italian destroyer Camicia Nera (Regia Marina).
Belchen	Germany	World War II: The tanker was shelled and sunk in the Davis Strait (approximately 59°N 17°W) by HMS Aurora and HMS Kenya (both Royal Navy) with the loss of five of the 54 people on board. Survivors were rescued by U-93 (Kriegsmarine).
Eibergen	Netherlands	World War II: The cargo ship was torpedoed and sunk in the Atlantic Ocean (48°02′N 25°06′W) by U-75 (Kriegsmarine) with the loss of four of her 39 crew. Survivors were rescued by HMS Cairo (Royal Navy).
Iki Kardeshler	Turkey	World War II: The auxiliary schooner was torpedoed and sunk in the Mediterranean Sea (35°36′N 32°52′E) by HM MTB 215 (Royal Navy).
Inversuir	United Kingdom	World War II: The tanker was torpedoed, shelled and damaged in the Atlantic Ocean (48°28′N 28°20′W) by U-48 (Kriegsmarine). She was later torpedoed and sunk by U-75 (Kriegsmarine). Her 45 crew were rescued by Para (Norway), HMS Wanderer (Royal Navy) and another ship.
John	Belgium	World War II: The fishing trawler (197 GRT) was bombed and sunk by Luftwaffe aircraft in the Atlantic Ocean 90 miles NW of St. Kilda. There were no casualties. All 11 crew were rescued by Thorshavet (Norway).
HMS Mamari	Royal Navy	World War II: The decoy ship struck the wreck of Ahamo (Hong Kong) in the North Sea (53°22′N 0°59′E) and remained fast on the wreck. She was attacked the next day by Kriegsmarine schnellboots, but the torpedo struck Ahamo. Her crew were rescued by Sabine (United Kingdom). The wreck was subsequently dispersed by explosives.
Montello	Italy	World War II: The cargo ship (6,117 GRT) was bombed and sunk in the Mediterranean Sea 20 nautical miles (37 km) north east of the Kerkennah Islands (35°25′N 11°57′E) by Bristol Blenheim aircraft of the Royal Air Force with the loss of all 43 hands.
Royal Fusilier	United Kingdom	World War II: The cargo ship was bombed and damaged in the North Sea (55°22′N 1°21′W) by Luftwaffe aircraft. She sank 4 nautical miles (7.4 km) south west of the Isle of May, Fife. Her crew were rescued.

== 4 June ==
List of shipwrecks: 4 June 1941
Ship	State	Description
Esso Hamburg	Germany	World War II: The tanker was intercepted in the Atlantic Ocean (7°35′N 31°25′W) by HMS Brilliant and London (both Royal Navy) and was scuttled by her crew. All 87 were rescued.
Gonzenheim	Germany	World War II: The supply ship was intercepted in the Atlantic Ocean (43°29′N 24°04′W) by HMS Nelson and HMS Neptune (both Royal Navy) and was scuttled by her crew. Sixty-three survivors were rescued by HMS Neptune. Gonzenheim was shelled by HMS Esperance Bay (Royal Navy) and torpedoed by HMS Neptune.
Queensbury	United Kingdom	World War II: Convoy WN 36: The cargo ship was bombed and damaged in the Atlantic Ocean (56°47′30″N 2°09′00″W) by Luftwaffe aircraft with the loss of eleven of her 38 crew. She was scuttled by HMT Sturton (Royal Navy)
Robert Hughes	United Kingdom	World War II: The dredger struck a mine and sank at the mouth of the Ogun River, Lagos, Nigeria with the loss of fourteen of her 31 crew.
Trecarrell	United Kingdom	World War II: The cargo ship was torpedoed and sunk in the Atlantic Ocean (47°10′N 31°00′W) by U-101 (Kriegsmarine) with the loss of four of her 47 crew. Survivors were rescued by Corner Brook (United Kingdom).
HMS Van Meerlant	Royal Navy	World War II: The Douwe Aukes-class minelayer struck a mine and sank in the Thames Estuary off the Isle of Sheppey, Kent (51°28′N 00°52′E) with the loss of 42 of her crew.

== 5 June ==
List of shipwrecks: 5 June 1941
Ship	State	Description
HMT Ash	Royal Navy	World War II: The naval trawler struck a mine and sank in the Thames Estuary with the loss of two of her crew.
Egerland	Germany	World War II: The tanker was intercepted in the Atlantic Ocean (approximately 7°N 31°W) by HMS Brilliant and London (both Royal Navy) and was scuttled by her crew. All 94 were rescued.
Frieda	Italy	World War II: The coaster was torpedoed and sunk in the Mediterranean Sea (31°39′N 15°39′E) by HMS Triumph (Royal Navy) with the loss of one of her eight crew.
Himalaya	United Kingdom	World War II: The coal hulk was bombed and sunk at Portland, Dorset by Luftwaffe aircraft.
HMT Lavinia L.	Royal Navy	World War II: The barrage balloon drifter was bombed and sunk at Sheerness, Kent by Luftwaffe aircraft. A crew member was killed.
Trio Frassinetti	Italy	World War II: The coaster was torpedoed and sunk in the Mediterranean Sea (31°39′N 15°39′E) by HMS Triumph (Royal Navy). Her fifteen crew survived.
Valoroso	Regia Marina	World War II: The gunboat was torpedoed and sunk in the Mediterranean Sea (31°39′N 15°39′E) by HMS Triumph (Royal Navy) with the loss of two of her 38 crew.
Wellfield	United Kingdom	World War II: The tanker was torpedoed and sunk in the Atlantic Ocean (48°34′N 31°34′W) by U-48 (Kriegsmarine) with the loss of eight of her 42 crew. Survivors were rescued by Heina (Norway)

== 6 June ==
List of shipwrecks: 6 June 1941
Ship	State	Description
Alberta	France	World War II: The tanker was shelled and damaged in the Aegean Sea 8 nautical miles (15 km) north east of Cape Hellas, Greece by HMS Torbay (Royal Navy). An attempt by the tug Taxiarchis (Turkey) to take the ship in tow was repelled by HMS Torbay. Alberta was sunk by HMS Torbay on 10 June.
Baron Lovat	United Kingdom	World War II: Convoy OG 63: The cargo ship was torpedoed and sunk in the Atlantic Ocean (35°30′N 11°30′W) by Guglielmo Marconi (Regia Marina). Her 35 crew survived.
Elbe	Germany	World War II: The cargo liner was torpedoed and sunk in the Atlantic Ocean 900 nautical miles (1,700 km) north west of the Cape Verde Islands (23°30′N 36°09′W) by five Fairey Swordfish aircraft of 824 Squadron, Fleet Air Arm based on HMS Eagle (Royal Navy) with the loss of two of her 21 crew. Survivors were rescued by HMS Hilary (Royal Navy).
Glen Head	United Kingdom	World War II: The cargo ship was bombed and sunk in the Atlantic Ocean south west of Cape St. Vincent, Portugal (35°40′N 10°30′W) by Focke-Wulf Fw 200 aircraft of I Staffeln, Kampfgeschwader 40, Luftwaffe with the loss of 27 of her crew.
Sacramento Valley	United Kingdom	World War II: The cargo ship was torpedoed and sunk in the Atlantic Ocean (17°10′N 30°10′W) by U-106 (Kriegsmarine) with the loss of three of her 49 crew. Survivors were rescued by Caithness (United Kingdom) and Stanvac Calcutta (Panama).
Taberg	Sweden	World War II: Convoy OG 63: The cargo ship was torpedoed and sunk in the Atlantic Ocean (35°36′N 11°12′W) by Guglielmo Marconi (Regia Marina) with the loss of fifteen of her crew.
Taurus	Norway	World War II: The cargo ship was bombed and sunk in the North Sea (56°47′N 2°15′W) by Luftwaffe aircraft. Her 37 crew were rescued by HMT Chrysolite (Royal Navy) and the fishing vessel Elizabeth (United Kingdom).
Tregarthen	United Kingdom	World War II: The cargo ship was torpedoed and sunk in the Atlantic Ocean (46°17′N 36°20′W) by U-48 (Kriegsmarine) with the loss of all 45 crew.
Yselhaven	Netherlands	World War II: The 4,802 GRT cargo ship on a passage from Liverpool for St. Lawrence River ports in ballast, was torpedoed and sunk in the Atlantic Ocean (49°25′N 40°54′W) by U-43 (Kriegsmarine) with the loss of 24 of her 34 crew. Survivors were rescued by Hammarland (Finland).

== 7 June ==
List of shipwrecks: 7 June 1941
Ship	State	Description
Delaware	Denmark	World War II: The cargo ship was attacked by Royal Air Force aircraft off the coast of South Holland, Netherlands and was damaged. She was subsequently repaired and returned to service.
Kingston Hill	United Kingdom	World War II: The cargo ship was torpedoed and sunk in the Atlantic Ocean south west of the Cape Verde Islands (9°35′N 29°00′W) by U-38) (Kriegsmarine) with the loss of fourteen of her 46 crew. Kingston Hill was on a voyage from Cardiff, Glamorgan to Alexandria, Egypt.
No. 10	Royal Navy	World War II: The examination vessel a former pilot boat, struck a mine and sank at Milford Haven, Pembrokeshire.

== 8 June ==
List of shipwrecks: 8 June 1941
Ship	State	Description
Adda	United Kingdom	World War II: The ocean liner was torpedoed and sunk in the Atlantic Ocean 82 nautical miles (152 km) west of Freetown, Sierra Leone (8°30′N 14°39′W) by U-107 (Kriegsmarine) with the loss of ten of the 425 people on board. Survivors were rescued by HMS Cyclamen (Royal Navy).
Baron Nairn	United Kingdom	World War II: The cargo ship was torpedoed and sunk in the Atlantic Ocean (47°35′N 39°02′W) by U-108 (Kriegsmarine) with the loss of one of her 40 crew. Eighteen survivors were rescued by HMCS Chambly (Royal Canadian Navy).
HMT Cor Jesu	Royal Navy	World War II: The naval trawler was bombed and sunk in the North Sea off Alnmouth, Northumberland (55°29′N 1°27′W) by Luftwaffe aircraft. Her crew were rescued.
Dirphys	Greece	World War II: The cargo ship was torpedoed and sunk in the Atlantic Ocean (47°44′N 39°02′W) by U-108 (Kriegsmarine) with the loss of six of her 25 crew.
Elmdene	United Kingdom	World War II: The cargo ship was torpedoed and sunk in the Atlantic Ocean 200 nautical miles (370 km) west south west of Freetown, Sierra Leone (8°16′N 16°50′W) by U-103 (Kriegsmarine). Her 36 crew were rescued by Carlton (United States). Elmdene was on a voyage from the River Tyne to Alexandria, Egypt.
Hopton	United Kingdom	World War II: The fishing trawler struck a mine and sank in the Atlantic Ocean off the coast of Iceland (62°56′N 12°30′W) with the loss of eleven of her crew.
Kingston Hill	United Kingdom	World War II: The cargo ship was torpedoed and sunk in the Atlantic Ocean south west of the Cape Verde Islands, Portugal (9°35′N 29°40′W) by U-38 (Kriegsmarine) with the loss of fourteen of her 62 crew. Survivors were rescued by HMS Achates (Royal Navy) and Alabama (United States).
Pendrecht	Netherlands	World War II: The 10,746 GRT tanker on a passage from Holyhead for New York in ballast, was torpedoed and sunk in the Atlantic Ocean (45°18′N 36°40′W) by U-48 (Kriegsmarine). Her 36 crew were rescued by Alresford (United Kingdom), Excalibur (United States) and HMS Pandora (Royal Navy).
Sturla	Italy	World War II: The 1,195 GRT cargo ship was shelled and sunk in the Mediterranean Sea 5 nautical miles (9.3 km) off Maratea by HMS Clyde (Royal Navy) with the loss of ten of her fifteen crew.

== 9 June ==
List of shipwrecks: 9 June 1941
Ship	State	Description
Dagmar	United Kingdom	World War II: Convoy HG 53: The coaster was bombed and sunk off St Alban's Head, Dorset (50°29′40″N 2°00′30″W) by Focke-Wulf Fw 200 aircraft of the Luftwaffe with the loss of three of her eighteen crew.
Diana	United Kingdom	World War II: The coaster was bombed and sunk in the Atlantic Ocean (62°04′N 13°40′W) by Focke-Wulf Fw 200 aircraft of I Staffeln, Kampfgeschwader 40, Luftwaffe with the loss of a crew member. Survivors were rescued by HMT Cape Portland (Royal Navy).
Fenix	Finland	World War II: The cargo ship was bombed and sunk in the Atlantic Ocean (61°56′N 12°14′W) by Focke-Wulf Fw 200 aircraft of I Staffeln, Kampfgeschwader 40, Luftwaffe with the loss of a crew member.
Persier	Belgium	After being stranded on the coast of Iceland in February 1941 and refloated in April 1941, the cargo ship broke her back when she was taken to the Kleppsvik Strand and was beached. She was later repaired and returned to service.
Phidias	United Kingdom	World War II: Convoy OB 330: The cargo ship was torpedoed, shelled and sunk in the Atlantic Ocean (48°25′N 26°12′W) by U-46 (Kriegsmarine) with the loss of eight of her 51 crew. Survivors were rescued by Embassage (United Kingdom).
Remagio	United Kingdom	World War II: The fishing trawler was bombed and damaged in the North Sea off Bamburgh, Northumberland (48°46′N 29°14′W) by Luftwaffe aircraft and was abandoned, coming ashore north of Bamburgh. Her ten crew survived. She was refloated on 26 June and taken to Lindisfarne.
Sabina	Spain	World War II: The cargo ship struck a mine and sank in the Mediterranean Sea 40 nautical miles (74 km) off Genoa, Italy (36°05′N 5°12′W). Her crew were rescued.
Trevarrack	United Kingdom	World War II: The cargo ship was torpedoed and sunk in the Atlantic Ocean (46°45′N 38°00′W) by U-101 (Kriegsmarine) with the loss of all 45 crew.

== 10 June ==
List of shipwrecks: 10 June 1941
Ship	State	Description
Ainderby	United Kingdom	World War II: The 4,860 GRT cargo ship on a trip from Santos for Tyne with a cargo of iron ore, was torpedoed and sunk in the Atlantic Ocean 130 nautical miles (240 km) west by north of Bloody Foreland, County Donegal, Ireland (55°30′N 12°10′W) by U-552 (Kriegsmarine) with the loss of twelve of her 41 crew. Survivors were rescued by HMS Veteran (Royal Navy).
Christian Krohg	Norway	World War II: Convoy OB 328: The 1,992 GRT cargo ship on a passage from Oban for St. Lawrence in ballast, was torpedoed and sunk in the Atlantic Ocean (45°00′N 36°30′W) by U-108 (Kriegsmarine) with the loss of all 23 crew.
Giuseppina Ghirardi	Italy	World War II: The 3,319 GRT tanker was in Bulgaria when Italy entered the war. She was torpedoed and sunk in the Aegean Sea 8 nautical miles (15 km) east of Cape Helles, Turkey by HMS Torbay (Royal Navy) while on her way for Piraeus.
India	Italy	World War II: The cargo ship was scuttled at Assab, Italian Eritrea. She was refloated in 1949 and scrapped.
Mercier	Belgium	World War II: The 7,886 GRT cargo ship on a passage from Liverpool for Montreal in ballast, was torpedoed and sunk in the Atlantic Ocean (48°30′N 41°30′W) by U-204 (Kriegsmarine) with the loss of seven of her 68 crew.
Pagao	Italy	World War II: The cargo ship was scuttled at Algeciras, Spain. She was refloated in 1944, fitted with a new bow section and entered Spanish service in 1945 as Zaragoza.
Piave	Italy	World War II: The cargo ship was scuttled at Assab. She was refloated in 1950 and scrapped in 1951.
HMS Pintail	Royal Navy	World War II: Convoy FN 477: The Kingfisher-class sloop struck a mine in the Humber Estuary and sank with the loss of 53 of her 75 crew. Survivors were rescued by HMS Quantock (Royal Navy) and another vessel.
Royal Scot	United Kingdom	World War II: The cargo ship struck a mine and sank in the North Sea off the mouth of the Humber with the loss of eleven of her crew.

== 11 June ==
List of shipwrecks: 11 June 1941
Ship	State	Description
Baron Carnegie	United Kingdom	World War II: The cargo ship was bombed and damaged in the North Sea (51°55′N 5°34′W) by Luftwaffe aircraft. She was taken in tow by Seine (United Kingdom) but sank at 52°04′N 5°01′W with the loss of 25 of her 39 crew.
Cirene	Regia Marina	World War II: The naval trawler was bombed and sunk at Benghazi, Libya by British aircraft.
Havtor	Norway	World War II: The cargo ship was torpedoed, shelled and sunk in the Atlantic Ocean (63°35′N 28°05′W) by U-79 (Kriegsmarine) with the loss of six of her 20 crew.
Mario Bianco	Regia Marina	World War II: The naval trawler was sunk at Benghazi by British aircraft.
Moorwood	United Kingdom	World War II: The cargo ship was torpedoed and sunk in the North Sea off Hartlepool, County Durham by Luftwaffe aircraft. Her crew were rescued. She was on a voyage from London to Blyth, Northumberland.
Tilly L. M. Russ	Germany	World War II: The cargo ship was torpedoed and sunk at Benghazi by HMS Taku (Royal Navy).

== 12 June ==
List of shipwrecks: 12 June 1941
Ship	State	Description
Carloforte	Regia Marina	World War II: The requisitioned 143 GRT motor schooner (V. 121) was shelled and sunk in the Mediterranean Sea 36 nautical miles (67 km) west of Gorgona by HNLMS O-24 (Royal Netherlands Navy).
Chinese Prince	United Kingdom	World War II: The cargo ship was torpedoed and sunk in the Atlantic Ocean south of Rockall, Inverness-shire (56°12′N 14°18′W) by U-552 (Kriegsmarine) with the loss of 45 of her 63 crew. Survivors were rescued by HMS Arbutus and HMS Pimpernel (both Royal Navy).
Empire Dew	United Kingdom	World War II: The cargo ship was torpedoed and sunk in the Atlantic Ocean north of the Azores, Portugal (51°09′N 30°16′W by U-48 (Kriegsmarine) with the loss of 23 of her 42 crew. Survivors were rescued by HNoMS St. Albans (Royal Norwegian Navy).
Fianona	Italy	World War II: The 6,660 GRT cargo ship, on a passage from Genoa for Bagnoli, was shelled, torpedoed and sunk in the Mediterranean Sea off San Vincenzo (43°08′N 10°30′E) by HNLMS O-24 (Royal Netherlands Navy).
Friedrich Breme	Kriegsmarine	World War II: The tanker was shelled and sunk in the Atlantic Ocean (49°48′N 24°00′W) by HMS Sheffield (Royal Navy) with the loss of at least two of her crew. Eighty-six survivors were rescued.
Gesù e Maria	Regia Marina	World War II: The requisitioned 238 GRT motor schooner (V. 165) on a trip from Piraeus for Mudros, was shelled and sunk in the Aegean Sea off Skiros, Greece (39°10′N 25°20′E) by HMS Torbay (Royal Navy).
Iowan	United States	The cargo ship ran aground on a reef a few hundred yards off Government Point, near Point Conception, California. Salvage operations took about two weeks, after which she was towed to Los Angeles, California, for repairs. She was later returned to service.
Ranella	Norway	World War II: Convoy OG 64: The tanker was torpedoed and sunk in the Atlantic Ocean (43°39′N 28°00′W) by U-553 (Kriegsmarine). Her 29 crew survived.
Silvio Scaroni	Italy	World War II: The cargo ship was torpedoed and sunk in the Mediterranean Sea 70 nautical miles (130 km) west of Benghazi, Libya (32°27′N 18°42′E) by HMS Taku (Royal Navy).
Silverpalm	United Kingdom	World War II: The cargo ship was torpedoed and sunk in the Atlantic Ocean by U-371 (Kriegsmarine) with the loss of all 68 crew.
Susan Mærsk	United Kingdom	World War II: The cargo ship was torpedoed and sunk in the Atlantic Ocean 370 nautical miles (690 km) north north east of the Azores (44°45′N 25°15′W) by U-553 (Kriegsmarine) with the loss of all 24 crew.

== 13 June ==
For the loss of the Norwegian coaster Ala on this day, see the entry for 17 May 1941

List of shipwrecks: 13 June 1941
Ship	State	Description
Djurdjura	United Kingdom	World War II: Convoy SL 75: The cargo ship was torpedoed and sunk in the Atlantic Ocean (38°53′N 23°11′W) by Brin (Regia Marina) with the loss of 33 of her 38 crew.
Eirini Kyriakidou	Greece	World War II: Convoy SL 75: The cargo ship was torpedoed and sunk in the Atlantic Ocean (38°53′N 23°11′W) by Brin (Regia Marina) with the loss of all three of her crew.
HMT King Henry	Royal Navy	World War II: The naval trawler was bombed and sunk at Lowestoft, Suffolk by Luftwaffe aircraft.
Kingstown	United Kingdom	World War II: The coaster was bombed and damaged in the Bristol Channel 9 nautical miles (17 km) north west of the South Bishop Lighthouse by Luftwaffe aircraft. She was taken in tow by a fishing trawler but sank 6 nautical miles (11 km) off St. Ann's Head, Pembrokeshire. Her crew were rescued.
Pandias	Greece	World War II: The cargo ship was torpedoed and sunk in the Atlantic Ocean (7°49′N 23°38′W) by U-107 (Kriegsmarine) with the loss of eleven of her 34 crew.
St. Patrick	United Kingdom	World War II: The ferry was bombed and sunk in the Irish Sea (52°04′N 5°25′W) with the loss of 31 of the 89 people on board.
Tresillian	United Kingdom	World War II: The cargo ship was torpedoed and sunk in the Atlantic Ocean (44°40′N 45°30′W) by U-77 (Kriegsmarine). Her 46 crew were rescued by USCGC Duane ( United States Coast Guard).

== 14 June ==
List of shipwrecks: 14 June 1941
Ship	State	Description
Luciano Bottiglieri	Regia Marina	World War II: The auxiliary patrol vessl (331 GRT) was shelled and sunk in the Mediterranean Sea about twenty miles south of Cape Spartivento, Sardinia by HMS Clyde (Royal Navy). Seven crew were killed. The seven survivors, four being wounded, were captured by the British submarine.
St. Lindsay	United Kingdom	World War II: Convoy OG 64: The cargo ship was torpedoed and sunk in the Atlantic Ocean (approximately 51°N 30°W) by U-751 (Kriegsmarine) with the loss of all 43 crew.

== 15 June ==
List of shipwrecks: 15 June 1941
Ship	State	Description
Audacious	United Kingdom	World War II: The fishing boat (7 GRT) struck a mine and sank in the North Sea (51°28′N 0°51′E) with the loss two of her three crew.
G R F	United States	With no one on board, the scow was wrecked on the beach at Karluk, Territory of Alaska.
Hans Broge	Denmark	World War II: The cargo ship was bombed and sunk in the North Sea 15 nautical miles (28 km) west south west of Texel, North Holland, Netherlands by Royal Air Force aircraft. The wreck was subsequently raised and employed as a target ship.

== 16 June ==
List of shipwrecks: 16 June 1941
Ship	State	Description
Chevalier Paul	(France) Vichy French Navy	World War II:Operation Exporter: The Vauquelin-class destroyer was torpedoed and sunk in the Mediterranean Sea off Latakia, Syria by Fairey Swordfish aircraft of 815 Squadron, Fleet Air Arm with the loss of six of her crew. Survivors were rescued by Valmy and Guépard (both (France) Vichy French Navy).
V 5706 Ostmark	Kriegsmarine	The vorpostenboot ran aground and sank off Vågsøy, Norway.

== 17 June ==
List of shipwrecks: 17 June 1941
Ship	State	Description
Cathrine	United Kingdom	World War II: Convoy SL 76: The cargo ship was torpedoed and sunk in the Atlantic Ocean (49°30′N 16°00′W) by U-43 (Kriegsmarine) with the loss of 24 of her 27 crew. Survivors were rescued by the trawler Boreas (United Kingdom).
Charlottetown	Canada	The ferry ran aground off Port Mouton, Nova Scotia. She sank the next day at 43°51′N 64°45′W.
Tottenham	United Kingdom	World War II: The cargo ship was torpedoed and sunk in the Atlantic Ocean (7°38′S 19°12′W) by Atlantis (Kriegsmarine). Her 43 crew survived, but 26 of them were taken as prisoners of war. Tottenham was on a voyage from the River Tyne to the Middle East.

== 18 June ==
List of shipwrecks: 18 June 1941
Ship	State	Description
Doris II	United Kingdom	World War II: The fishing vessel struck a mine and sank in the Thames Estuary off Sheerness, Kent with the loss of both crew.
Norfolk	United Kingdom	World War II: The cargo ship was torpedoed and sunk in the Atlantic Ocean 150 nautical miles (280 km) north west of Malin Head, County Donegal, Ireland (57°17′N 11°14′W) by U-552 (Kriegsmarine) with the loss of one of her 71 crew. Survivors were rescued by HMS Skate (Royal Navy).
U-138	Kriegsmarine	World War II: The Type IID submarine was depth charged and sunk in the Atlantic Ocean off Cape Trafalgar, Spain (36°04′N 7°29′W) by HMS Faulknor, Fearless, Forester, Foresight and Foxhound (all Royal Navy). Her 27 crew were rescued by HMS Fearless and taken as prisoners of war.

== 19 June ==
List of shipwrecks: 19 June 1941
Ship	State	Description
Empire Warrior	United Kingdom	World War II: The cargo ship was bombed and sunk in the Atlantic Ocean off Vila Real de Santo António, Portugal (37°06′N 7°24′W) by Regia Aeronautica aircraft and Focke-Wulf Fw 200 aircraft of I Staffeln, Kampfgeschwader 40, Luftwaffe. Her 25 crew were rescued by an Armada Portuguesa destroyer.
Gunda	Sweden	World War II: The cargo ship was bombed and sunk in the Atlantic Ocean (37°36′N 9°53′W) by Focke-Wulf Fw 200 aircraft of I Staffeln, Kampfgeschwader 40, Luftwaffe. Her 21 crew were rescued by HMT Imperialist (Royal Navy) and Peterel (United Kingdom).

== 20 June ==
List of shipwrecks: 20 June 1941
Ship	State	Description
Buccari	Italy	World War II: The 4,543 GRT cargo ship on a passage from Messina for Taranto, struck mines, broke in two, and sank off Ginosa.
Enossis	Greece	World War II: The cargo ship was bombed and sunk in Suda Bay, Crete by Luftwaffe aircraft. (Note: The date may more likely be 20 May, a month before, when Germans attacked Crete; by 20 June the island was firmly under German control and there was no fighting to speak of.)
Ganda	Portugal	World War II: The cargo liner was torpedoed and sunk in the Atlantic Ocean off Casablanca, Morocco (34°10′N 11°40′W) by U-123 (Kriegsmarine) with the loss of five of the 66 people on board.
Ilse	United Kingdom	World War II: The cargo ship struck a mine and was damaged in the North Sea off Hartlepool, County Durham. Her back was broken, and the bow section was beyond salvage. She was repaired at Middlesbrough, Yorkshire, where a new bow section was constructed.
Inverarder	United Kingdom	World War II: The tanker was bombed and damaged in the English Channel off the Isle of Wight by Luftwaffe aircraft and was beached in the Solent. She was later refloated, repaired and returned to service.
USS O-9	United States Navy	Sonar image of the wreck of USS O-9 The O-class submarine sank in 430 feet (130 m) of water in the Atlantic Ocean 15 nautical miles (28 km; 17 mi) off Portsmouth, New Hampshire, and 17 nautical miles (31 km; 20 mi) east of the Isles of Shoals at either 42°59′N 70°27′W or 42°59′N 70°27′W (according to different sources) with the loss of her 33 crew when her hull was crushed during a test dive.
Refah	Turkey	World War II: Refah tragedy: The cargo liner was torpedoed and sunk in the Mediterranean Sea 40 nautical miles (74 km) south of Mersin by Ondina (Regia Marina) with the loss of 168 lives.
HMT Resmilo	Royal Navy	World War II: The naval trawler was bombed and sunk in the North Sea off Peterhead, Aberdeenshire by Luftwaffe aircraft. Her 24 crew were rescued.
Schieland	Netherlands	World War II: Convoy FS 520: The cargo ship was bombed and sunk in the North Sea (53°18′N 1°01′E) by Luftwaffe aircraft. Eight survivors were rescued by HMS Mendip (Royal Navy).

== 21 June ==
List of shipwrecks: 21 June 1941
Ship	State	Description
Babitonga	Kriegsmarine	World War II: The supply ship was intercepted in the Atlantic Ocean (2°05′N 27°42′W or 2°05′S 27°42′W) by HMS London (Royal Navy) and was scuttled by her crew.
Criton	United Kingdom	World War II: Convoy SL 78: The captured French cargo ship left the convoy to return to Freetown, Sierra Leone. She was intercepted in the Atlantic Ocean by Air France IV ( Vichy French Navy) which ordered her to divert to Conakry, French Guinea. She was shelled and sunk when she reported this by radio; with the loss of ten of her 34 crew. Survivors were rescued and made prisoners of war.
Gasfire	United Kingdom	World War II: The cargo ship struck a mine and sank in the North Sea 10 nautical miles (19 km) east of Southwold, Suffolk (52°19′N 1°59′E).
Kenneth Hawksfield	United Kingdom	World War II: The cargo ship struck a mine and sank in the North Sea 10 nautical miles (19 km) east of Southwold (52°18′N 1°59′E) with the loss of a crew member.

== 22 June ==
List of shipwrecks: 22 June 1941
Ship	State	Description
Arakaka	United Kingdom	World War II: The weather ship was torpedoed and sunk in the Atlantic Ocean (47°00′N 41°40′W) by U-77 (Kriegsmarine) with the loss of all 40 crew.
Balzac	United Kingdom	World War II: The cargo ship was shelled and sunk in the Atlantic Ocean (15°16′S 27°43′W) by Atlantis (Kriegsmarine) with the loss of three of her 48 crew.
HMT Beech	Royal Navy	World War II: The naval trawler was bombed and sunk at Scrabster, Caithness by Luftwaffe aircraft with the loss of eleven of her crew.
Calabria	Sweden	World War II: Convoy SL 76: The 1,277 GRT cargo ship on a trip from Port Harcourt for Hull with a cargo of palm kernels, straggled behind the convoy. She was torpedoed and sunk in the Atlantic Ocean 100 nautical miles (190 km) west of Inishtrahull Island, County Donegal, Ireland by U-141 (Kriegsmarine) with the loss of three of her 24 crew. Survivors were rescued by HMS Sikh (Royal Navy).
Claus Rickmers	Germany	World War II: The cargo ship was sunk at Ventspils, Latvia. She was later refloated and repaired.
Estonia	Estonia	World War II: The cargo ship was torpedoed and sunk in the Baltic Sea north west of Gotland, Sweden by S-28 (Kriegsmarine).
Gaisma	Soviet Union	World War II: The 3,077 GRT cargo ship on a trip from Riga for Lübeck with a cargo of lumber, was torpedoed in the Baltic Sea off Užava by S-59 and S-60 (both Kriegsmarine). Of her crew of 32, two were taken prisoner, six more were killed by machine gun fire, and the remaining 24 reached the Latvian shore in a lifeboat. Gaisma stayed afloat, with her decks partly awash, and begun drifting towards south-west. Days later, in mid July 1941, she ran aground in shallow water on the east coast of Gotland. She was found by Swedish military on 20 July 1941 and was declared a total loss.
Liisa	Soviet Union	World War II: The 782 GRT coaster on a trip from Liepāja for Paldiski with a cargo of cement and barbed wire, was shelled and sunk in the Baltic Sea off Hiiumaa, Finland by S-31 (Kriegsmarine). Her crew was taken prisoners and were interned in Finland.
Perkunas	Soviet Union	World War II: The Ice-class tug was sunk by Luftwaffe aircraft off Šventoji.
Pietro Querini	Italy	World War II: The 1,004 GRT cargo ship on a trip from Trapani for Tripoli was torpedoed and sunk in the Mediterranean Sea south of Pantelleria (36°11′N 12°00′E) by HMS Union (Royal Navy).
Ruhno	Soviet Navy	World War II: The requisitioned 498 GRT coaster (VT-587) struck a mine and sank while navigating in Leningrad Canal on approach to Petergof, with the loss of three lives. She was later raised, but was not repaired.
Shuka	Soviet Union	World War II: The fishing trawler was torpedoed and sunk in the Baltic Sea off Liepāja by S-31 (Kriegsmarine).
SP-12	Soviet Union	World War II: The sea-going tug struck an aerial mine laid by Luftwaffe aircraft in Quarantine Bay near Sevastopol and sank with a loss of 26 of her 31 crew.

== 23 June ==
List of shipwrecks: 23 June 1941
Ship	State	Description
Alf	Soviet Union	World War II: The cargo ship was sunk off Tallinn, Estonia by S-44 (Kriegsmarine).
Alstertor	Kriegsmarine	World War II: The supply and prison ship was intercepted in the Atlantic Ocean (41°12′N 13°10′W) by the 8th Destroyer Flotilla^{[Note 1]} and was scuttled by her crew. Over 200 British, Chinese, Indian and Malayan prisoners of war were rescued. These were the crews of Rabaul and Trafalgar (both United Kingdom).
Bystry	Soviet Navy	World War II: The Gnevny-class destroyer was bombed and sunk at Sevastopol by Luftwaffe aircraft. She was later salvaged.
Dnepr	Soviet Navy	World War II: The ship struck a mine and sank at Sevastopol.
Gnevnyi	Soviet Navy	World War II: The Gnevny-class destroyer struck a mine and sank in the Baltic Sea north of Hiiumaa, Estonia. There were 20 dead and 23 wounded.
Hull Trader	United Kingdom	World War II: The coaster struck a mine and sank in the North Sea off Cromer, Norfolk with the loss of eleven of her crew.
Khiumadal	Soviet Union	World War II: The lightship was sunk in the Baltic Sea by S-43 (Kriegsmarine).
M-78	Soviet Navy	World War II: The M-class submarine was torpedoed and sunk in the Baltic Sea west of Ventspils, Latvia (57°28′N 21°17′E) by U-144 (Kriegsmarine) with the loss of all fifteen crew.
HMT Nogi	Royal Navy	World War II: The naval trawler was bombed and damaged in the North Sea off Cromer (52°57′N 1°28′E) by Luftwaffe aircraft. She was taken in tow by HMT Contender and HMT Solon (both Royal Navy) but subsequently sank.
S-3	Soviet Navy	World War II: The S-class submarine was sunk in the Baltic Sea off Liepāja, Latvia by S-60 (Kriegsmarine) with a depth charge following a surface gun battle. Of the 100 people on board only three, nine, or twenty were rescued and made prisoners of war.
Trelissick	United Kingdom	World War II: The cargo ship was bombed and sunk in the North Sea off Cromer (53°07′01″N 1°24′09″E) by Luftwaffe aircraft with the loss of two of her 42 crew. The wreck was subsequently dispersed by explosives.

== 24 June ==
List of shipwrecks: 24 June 1941
Ship	State	Description
HMS Auckland	Royal Navy	World War II: The Egret-class sloop was bombed and sunk in the Mediterranean Sea 20 nautical miles (37 km) north east of Tobruk, Libya (32°15′N 24°30′E) by Junkers Ju 87 aircraft of II Staffeln, Sturzkampfgeschwader 2, Luftwaffe with the loss of 36 of her 198 crew. Survivors were rescued by HMAS Parramatta, HMAS Vendetta and HMAS Waterhen (all Royal Australian Navy).
Brockley Hill	United Kingdom	World War II: Convoy HX 133: The 5,297 GRT cargo ship on a trip from Montreal for London with a cargo of grain, straggled behind the convoy. She was torpedoed and sunk in the Atlantic Ocean (58°30′N 38°20′W) by U-651 (Kriegsmarine). Her 42 crew were rescued by Saugor (United Kingdom).
Kinross	United Kingdom	World War II: Convoy OB 336: The 4,956 GRT cargo ship on a passage from Dundee for Sydney in ballast, was torpedoed and sunk in the Atlantic Ocean south east of Cape Farewell, Greenland (55°23′N 38°49′W) by U-203 (Kriegsmarine). Her 37 crew were rescued by HMCS Orillia (Royal Canadian Navy).
Lenin	Soviet Navy	World War II: The Orfey-class destroyer was scuttled at Liepāja, Latvia.
M-71	Soviet Navy	World War II: The M-class submarine was scuttled at Liepāja.
M-80	Soviet Navy	World War II: The M-class submarine was scuttled at Liepāja.
Pass of Balmaha	United Kingdom	World War II: The 758 GRT tanker on a trip from Alexandria for Tobruk with a cargo of avgas, was bombed and damaged in the Mediterranean Sea by Junkers Ju 87 aircraft of II Staffeln, Sturzkampfgeschwader 2, Luftwaffe. She was towed to Tobruk, Libya by HMAS Waterhen (Royal Australian Navy) and repaired there, before returning to Alexandria on 30 June.
Ronis	Soviet Navy	World War II: The Ronis-class submarine was scuttled at Liepāja.
S-1	Soviet Navy	World War II: The S-class submarine was scuttled at Liepāja. She was salvaged by the Germans in October.
Silach	Soviet Union	World War II: The icebreaker (541 GRT) was scuttled at Liepāja by the Red Army. Raised by the Germans, towed to Danzig for repairs, and returned to service as Nordlicht. Returned to the USSR after the war.
Soløy	Norway	World War II: Convoy HX 133: The 4,402 GRT cargo ship on a trip from Buenos Aires for Hull with a cargo of wheat, was torpedoed and sunk in the Atlantic Ocean (54°39′N 39°43′W) by U-203 (Kriegsmarine). Her 32 crew were rescued by Traveller (United Kingdom).
Spidola	Soviet Navy	World War II: The Ronis-class submarine was scuttled at Liepāja.
T-208 Shkiv	Soviet Navy	World War II: The Fugas-class minesweeper hit a mine and sank at the exit from Hari Strait while accompanying damaged cruiser Maxim Gorky.
Tunguska	Soviet Navy	World War II: The auxiliary gunboat was scuttled at Liepāja.
Vigrid	Norway	World War II: Convoy HX 133: The 4,765 GRT cargo ship on a trip from New Orleans for Manchester with general cargo, straggled behind the convoy. She was torpedoed and sunk in the Atlantic Ocean (approximately 55°N 41°W) by U-371 (Kriegsmarine) with the loss of 28 of the 49 people on board. Survivors were rescued by USS Charles F. Hughes (United States Navy) and HMS Keppel (Royal Navy).

== 25 June ==
List of shipwrecks: 25 June 1941
Ship	State	Description
Anna Bulgaris	Greece	World War II: The 4,603 GRT cargo ship on a passage from Swansea for Montreal in ballast, was torpedoed and sunk in the Atlantic Ocean (49°30′N 44°00′W) by U-77 (Kriegsmarine) with the loss of all hands.
Dashwood	United Kingdom	World War II: The 2,154 GRT cargo ship on a passage from London for Sunderland in ballast, was bombed and sunk in the North Sea (52°59′N 1°52′E) by Luftwaffe aircraft. Her crew were rescued.
Ellinico	Greece	World War II: The 3,059 GRT cargo ship on a passage from Liverpool for Wabana in ballast, was torpedoed and sunk in the Atlantic Ocean (approximately 55°N 38°W) by U-108 (Kriegsmarine) with the loss of all hands.
Isle of Wight	United Kingdom	World War II: The 176 GRT fishing trawler was bombed and damaged in the North Sea off Scarborough, Yorkshire by Luftwaffe aircraft.
Nicolas Pateras	Greece	World War II: Convoy OB 336: The 4,362 GRT cargo ship on a passage from Liverpool for Pointe-au-Père in ballast, straggled behind the convoy. She was torpedoed and sunk in the Atlantic Ocean (approximately 55°N 38°W) by U-108 (Kriegsmarine) with the loss of all hands.
Schie	Netherlands	World War II: Convoy OB 336: The 1,967 GRT cargo ship on a passage from Aberdeen for Curaçao in ballast, straggled behind the convoy. She was torpedoed and sunk in the Atlantic Ocean (53°02′N 42°10′W) by U-75 (Kriegsmarine) with the loss of all 29 crew.
Souffleur	(France) Vichy French Navy	World War II: Operation Exporter: The submarine was torpedoed and sunk in the Mediterranean Sea off Beirut, Lebanon (33°49′N 35°26′E) by HMS Parthian (Royal Navy)

== 26 June ==
List of shipwrecks: 26 June 1941
Ship	State	Description
Enrico Costa	Italy	World War II: The cargo ship (4,080 GRT) was torpedoed and sunk in the Mediterranean Sea 4 nautical miles (7.4 km) off Cape Torado, Sicily (38°07′N 14°37′E) by HMS Utmost (Royal Navy). There were no casualties.
Mareeba	United Kingdom	World War II: The cargo ship (3,362 GRT) was shelled, stopped and sunk by scuttling charges in the Indian Ocean (8°15′N 88°06′E) by Kormoran (Kriegsmarine). All 48 crew were taken as prisoners of war but 25 died in the following months, most of them when the Spreewald was sunk.
Moskva	Soviet Navy	World War II: Raid on Constanța: The Leningrad-class destroyer was sunk by a Romanian minefield during a failed Soviet attack against the Romanian port of Constanța, which was defended by the destroyers NMS Mărăști, NMS Regina Maria, and the minelayer Amiral Murgescu (all Royal Romanian Navy).
Polinnia	Italy	World War II: The cargo ship (1,292 GRT) on a passage from Naples for Cagliari, was torpedoed, shelled and sunk in the Tyrrhenian Sea south east of Ischia (40°03′N 11°55′E) by HMS Severn (Royal Navy). There were no casualties and 19 survivors.
HMT Tranio	Royal Navy	World War II: The naval trawler (275 GRT) was bombed and sunk in the North Sea off Happisburgh, Norfolk by Luftwaffe aircraft. There were no casualties.
Velebit	Yugoslavia	World War II: The cargo ship was shelled and damaged in the Bay of Bengal by Kormoran (Kriegsmarine) with the loss of sixteen of her 28 crew. She came ashore 2 nautical miles (3.7 km) south west of North Reef Island, Andaman Islands and broke her back. She was a constructive total loss.

== 27 June ==
List of shipwrecks: 27 June 1941
Ship	State	Description
Empire Ability	United Kingdom	World War II: Convoy SL 78: The 7,603 GRT cargo ship on a trip from Port Louis for Liverpool with a cargo of sugar, was torpedoed and sunk in the Atlantic Ocean (23°50′N 21°10′W) by U-69 (Kriegsmarine), with the loss of two of the 107 people on board.
HMT Force	Royal Navy	World War II: The Mersey-class naval trawler was bombed, damaged and set on fire while anchored 6 miles (9.7 km) off Winterton Ness sinking in the North Sea off Great Yarmouth, Norfolk 52°48′55″N 001°47′48″E by Luftwaffe aircraft.
Glauco	Regia Marina	World War II: The Glauco-class submarine was shelled and sunk in the Atlantic Ocean west of Gibraltar (35°06′N 12°41′W) by HMS Wishart (Royal Navy). All 51 crew were rescued and taken as prisoners of war.
Knud Villemoes	Denmark	World War II: The cargo ship struck a mine and sank in the North Sea 3 nautical miles (5.6 km) north north east of Steingrun Prik, Heligoland, Germany.
Kongsgaard	Norway	World War II: Convoy HX 133: The tanker was torpedoed and damaged in the Atlantic Ocean (60°00′N 30°42′W) by U-564 (Kriegsmarine) and was abandoned by her crew. She was later reboarded, the fire extinguished and arrived at Belfast, County Antrim, United Kingdom on 2 July. She was later repaired and returned to service.
M-83	Soviet Navy	World War II: The damaged M-class submarine (161 GRT) was scuttled at Liepāja, Latvia, after having fired all her shells to support the defenders. The crew then tried to reach Soviet lines. Known losses in this attempt are two dead and six captured.
M-99	Soviet Navy	World War II: The M-class submarine was torpedoed and sunk in the Baltic Sea (59°20′N 21°12′E) by U-149 (Kriegsmarine) with the loss of all twenty crew.
Maasdam	Netherlands	World War II: Convoy HX 133: The 8,812 GRT cargo liner on a passage from Halifax for Liverpool, was torpedoed and sunk in the Atlantic Ocean off the coast of Greenland (60°00′N 30°35′W) by U-564 (Kriegsmarine) with the loss of two of the 80 people on board. Survivors were rescued by Havprins and another ship (both Norway)
Malaya II	United Kingdom	World War II: Convoy HX 133: The 8,651 GRT cargo ship on a passage from Montreal for Cardiff with a cargo of metal, wheat and dynamite, was torpedoed, exploded and sunk in the Atlantic Ocean off the coast of Greenland (59°56′N 30°35′W) by U-564 (Kriegsmarine) with the loss of 41 of her 49 crew. Survivors were rescued by HMCS Collingwood (Royal Canadian Navy).
Marijampole	Soviet Union	World War II: The 941 GRT coaster was sunk as a blockship by Soviet artillery in the Dvina estuary. Raised in August 1943, and towed to Wismar for repairs. Part of GDR fleet after the war.
Montferland	Netherlands	World War II: The 6,790 GRT cargo ship on a trip from Mackay for Oban with a cargo of steel and foodstuffs, was bombed and damaged in the North Sea (52°47′N 1°50′E) by Luftwaffe aircraft. She sank the next day (52°37′15″N 1°50′30″E). Her 43 crew were rescued. The wreck was subsequently dispersed by explosives.
Oberon	Netherlands	World War II: Convoy SL 78: The 1,996 GRT cargo ship on a trip from Douala for Hull with a cargo of palm kernels, was torpedoed and damaged in the Atlantic Ocean (25°43′N 22°47′W) by U-123 (Kriegsmarine). She sank the next day with the loss of six of her 34 crew. Survivors were rescued by a Royal Navy corvette.
P.L.M. 22	Free French Naval Forces	World War II: Convoy SL 78: The 5,646 GRT cargo ship on a trip from Pepel for Middlesbrough with a cargo of iron ore, was torpedoed and sunk in the Atlantic Ocean (25°43′N 22°47′W) by U-123 (Kriegsmarine) with the loss of 33 of her 44 crew. Survivors were rescued by HMS Armeria (Royal Navy).
River Lugar	United Kingdom	World War II: Convoy SL 78: The 5,423 GRT cargo ship on a trip from Pepel for Barry Roads with a cargo of iron ore, was torpedoed and sunk in the Atlantic Ocean (approximately 24°N 21°W) by U-69 (Kriegsmarine) with the loss of 41 of her 47 crew. Survivors were rescued by HMS Armeria and HMS Burdock (both Royal Navy).
S-10	Soviet Navy	World War II: The S-class submarine was torpedoed and sunk in the Irben Strait by S-59 and S-60 (both Kriegsmarine.
S-43	Kriegsmarine	World War II: The Type 1939/40 schnellboot struck a mine and sank in the Baltic Sea north of Hiiumaa, Estonia.
S-106	Kriegsmarine	World War II: The Type 1939/40 schnellboot struck a mine and sank in the Baltic Sea north of Hiiumaa (59°02′N 22°40′E) with the loss of six lives.
Salpa	Regia Marina	World War II: The submarine was torpedoed and sunk in the Mediterranean Sea off Mersa Matruh, Egypt (32°05′N 26°47′E) by HMS Triumph (Royal Navy).
TKA-27	Soviet Navy	World War II: The G-5-class motor torpedo boat, accompanying Vieniba, was sunk shortly after leaving port of Liepāja by two Luftwaffe bombers.
TKA-47	Soviet Navy	The G-5-class motor torpedo boat was heavily damaged during a fight against S-31, S-35, S-59 and S-60 (all Kriegsmarine) while covering the withdrawal of Vieniba. The boat ran out of fuel, drifted towards the shore and was abandoned by her crew of eight on 1 July. They were able to land near Ventspils where they were promptly detained by members of Aizsargi and transferred to German custody.
U-556	Kriegsmarine	World War II: The Type VIIC submarine was depth charged and sunk in the Atlantic Ocean southwest of Iceland (50°18′N 29°20′W) by HMS Celandine, HMS Gladiolus and HMS Nasturtium (all Royal Navy) with the loss of five of her 46 crew.
Vieniba	Soviet Union	World War II: The 288 GRT passenger-cargo vessel evacuating approximately 300 people from Liepāja, was bombed, machine-gunned and sunk by two Ju 87 bombers shortly after leaving port. There were only between 13 and 25 survivors.

== 28 June ==
List of shipwrecks: 28 June 1941
Ship	State	Description
Auris	United Kingdom	World War II: The 8,030 GRT tanker on a trip from Trinidad for Gibraltar with a cargo of fuel oil, was torpedoed and sunk in the Atlantic Ocean (34°27′N 11°57′W) by Leonardo da Vinci (Regia Marina) with the loss of 32 of her 59 crew. Survivors were rescued by HMS Farndale (Royal Navy).
Barrhill	United Kingdom	World War II: Convoy SC 33: The 4,972 GRT cargo ship on a voyage from New York for London with a cargo of grain, was bombed and sunk in the North Sea off Great Yarmouth (52°50′N 1°46′E) by Luftwaffe aircraft with the loss of five of her 40 crew.
Lauenburg	Kriegsmarine	Lauenburg World War II: North Atlantic weather war: The weather ship was captured and sunk off Jan Mayen, Norway by HMS Tartar (Royal Navy).
No. 204	Soviet Navy	World War II: The Project 1125-class gunboat was severely damaged by Romanian artillery on the Danube and ran aground. She was salvaged by the Romanians and put into service as NMB V12.
Pluto	Finland	World War II: The 3,496 GRT cargo ship on a trip from Buenos Aires for Petsamo with a cargo of grain, coal, and oil in drums, was detained by the British authorities on 20 June and redirected towards Reykjavík. After leaving Iceland, the ship was torpedoed and sunk in the Atlantic Ocean 100 nautical miles (190 km) north north west of the Butt of Lewis, Hebrides (59°39′N 8°20′W) by U-146 (Kriegsmarine) with the loss of twelve of her 30 crew. Survivors were rescued by HMT Northern Duke (Royal Navy).
Ugo Вassi	Regia Marina	World War II: The cargo ship (2,900 GRT) was torpedoed and sunk in the Gulf of Orosei 5 nautical miles (9.3 km) north east of Capo Monte Santi (40°07′N 9°50′E) by HMS Severn (Royal Navy). The whole crew was rescued but one died of his wounds by reaching land.

== 29 June ==
List of shipwrecks: 29 June 1941
Ship	State	Description
Cushendall	United Kingdom	World War II: The 626 GRT coaster on a trip from Southend for Methil and Clyde was bombed and sunk in the North Sea off Stonehaven (56°59.425′N 2°04.414′W) by Luftwaffe aircraft with the loss of two of her crew.
Don	United States	The excursion boat disappeared in fog in the Gulf of Maine during a day trip to Monhegan Island, Maine. She probably suffered an explosion and sank. All 34 people aboard perished. Her bow section was found in Casco Bay off Ragged Island.
Empire Meteor	United Kingdom	World War II: The cargo ship was bombed and damaged in the North Sea (53°05′N 1°30′E) by Luftwaffe aircraft. She was towed in to the Humber. She was subsequently repaired and returned to service.
Ernani	Italy	World War II: The blockade-running cargo ship, disguised as Enggano (Netherlands) was torpedoed and sunk in the Atlantic Ocean 450 nautical miles (830 km) west of Las Palmas, Canary Islands, Spain (27°52′N 26°17′W) by U-103 (Kriegsmarine).
George J. Goulandris	Greece	World War II: Convoy SL 78: The 4,345 GRT cargo ship on a trip from Mauritius for Leith Roads with a cargo of sugar, straggled behind the convoy. She was torpedoed and sunk in the Atlantic Ocean (29°05′N 25°10′W) by U-66 (Kriegsmarine). Her 28 crew survived.
Grayburn	United Kingdom	World War II: Convoy HX 133: The 6,342 GRT cargo ship on a trip from Baltimore for Swansea with a cargo of steel and trucks, was torpedoed and sunk in the Atlantic Ocean (59°30′N 18°07′W) by U-651 (Kriegsmarine) with the loss of 35 of her 53 crew. Survivors were rescued by HMS Arabis, HMT Northern Wave and HMS Violet (all Royal Navy).
Hekla	Iceland	World War II: The 1,215 GRT cargo ship on a passage from Reykjavík for New York in ballast, was torpedoed and sunk in the Atlantic Ocean (58°20′N 43°00′W) by U-564 (Kriegsmarine) with the loss of fourteen of her 20 crew. Survivors were rescued by HMS Candytuft (Royal Navy).
Kalypso Vergotti	Greece	World War II: Convoy SL 78: The 5,686 GRT cargo ship on a trip from Pepel for Glasgow with a cargo of iron ore, straggled behind the convoy. She was torpedoed and sunk in the Atlantic Ocean (29°00′N 25°00′W) by U-66 (Kriegsmarine) with the loss of all 36 crew.
Marta	Soviet Union	World War II: The 1,414 GRT cargo ship on a return trip from Kihelkonna for Tallinn was bombed and sunk in Soela Strait (58°36′N 22°27′E) by Luftwaffe aircraft.
Rio Azul	United Kingdom	World War II: Convoy SL 78: The 4,088 GRT cargo ship on a trip from Pepel for Middlesbrough with a cargo of iron ore, was torpedoed and sunk in the Atlantic Ocean (approximately 29°N 25°W) by U-123 (Kriegsmarine) with the loss of 33 of her 48 crew. Survivors were rescued by HMS Esperance Bay (Royal Navy).
U-651	Kriegsmarine	World War II: The Type VIIC submarine was depth charged and sunk in the Atlantic Ocean (59°52′N 18°36′W) by HMS Arabis, HMS Malcolm, HMS Scimitar, HMS Speedwell and HMS Violet (all Royal Navy). Her 45 crew were rescued.

== 30 June ==
List of shipwrecks: 30 June 1941
Ship	State	Description
Capacitas	Italy	World War II: The 5,371 GRT cargo ship on a trip from Genoa for Naples, was torpedoed and sunk in the Mediterranean Sea 7 nautical miles (13 km) northwest of San Vincenzo by HNLMS O 23 (Royal Netherlands Navy) with a loss of 5 men.
HMS Cricket	Royal Navy	World War II: The Insect-class gunboat was bombed and damaged in the Mediterranean Sea off the coast of Egypt by Junkers Ju 87 aircraft of I Staffeln, Sturzkampfgeschwader 2, Luftwaffe. She was towed to Alexandria, where she was declared a constructive total loss.
Empire Larch	United Kingdom	World War II: The Larch-class tug was bombed and damaged in the North Sea off Great Yarmouth, Norfolk by Luftwaffe aircraft. She was repaired and returned to service.
Krimulda	Soviet Union	World War II: The 1,970 GRT cargo ship, part of the Riga Evacuation Convoy, struck a mine at the exit from Väinameri, off Vormsi (59°08′N 22°58′E), and sunk with a loss of five of her crew.
MO-143	Soviet Navy	World War II: The MO-4-class patrol boat struck a mine and sank in the Baltic Sea off Mohni.
Orel	Soviet Navy	World War II: Soviet evacuation of Odessa: The requisitioned 5,152 GRT cargo ship, former Spanish vessel Mar Blanco, was scuttled as a blockship at Odessa by the Red Army. Raised in 1943 and towed to Constanta for repairs. Recaptured by the Soviets in August 1944.
Peter the Great	Soviet Navy	World War II: Soviet evacuation of Odessa: The requisitioned 5,750 GRT passenger-cargo ship undergoing repairs, was scuttled as a blockship at Odessa by the Red Army. Raised in 1942 and towed to Galatz for repairs. Recaptured by the Soviets in August 1944.
Plekhanov	Soviet Navy	World War II: Soviet evacuation of Odessa: The requisitioned 3,344 GRT cargo ship was scuttled as a blockship at Odessa by the Red Army. In 1942-43 raised and towed to Constanta for repairs. Recaptured by the Red Army in August 1944.
Pskov	Soviet Navy	World War II: Soviet evacuation of Odessa: The requisitioned 5,121 GRT cargo ship, former Spanish vessel Isla de Gran Canaria, was scuttled as a blockship at Odessa by the Red Army. Raised in 1943 and towed to Constanta for repairs. Recaptured by the Soviets in August 1944.
Saint Anselm	United Kingdom	World War II: Convoy SL 78: The cargo ship straggled behind the convoy. She was torpedoed and sunk in the Atlantic Ocean (approximately 31°N 26°W) by U-66 (Kriegsmarine) with the loss of 34 of her 67 crew. Survivors were rescued by HMS Moreton Bay (Royal Navy) and Tom (Spain).
Voikov	Soviet Union	World War II: Soviet evacuation of Odesa: The cargo ship was scuttled at Odesa by the Red Army.
HMAS Waterhen	Royal Australian Navy	World War II: While under tow by the destroyer HMS Defender (Royal Navy), the W-class destroyer capsized and sank in the Mediterranean Sea (32°15′N 25°20′E) due to bomb damage suffered the previous day during an attack by Junkers Ju 87 dive bombers of the Regia Aeronautica and Luftwaffe. She was the first Royal Australian Navy ship lost due to enemy action during World War II.

== Unknown date ==
List of shipwrecks: Unknown date 1941
Ship	State	Description
Ardena	Greece	World War II: The passenger ferry, a former Azalea-class sloop, was sunk by the Germans some time in June. She was raised, repaired and put into German service.
Unnamed patrol boat	Soviet Navy	World War II: The patrol boat, one of the six patrol boats of the Soviet Danube Flotilla, was shelled and sunk by the monitors NMS Basarabia and NMS Mihail Kogălniceanu (both Royal Romanian Navy) on 22 or 23 June.

== Notes ==
1. The 8th Destroyer Flotilla comprised HMS Faulknor, HMS Foresight, HMS Forester, HMS Foxhound and HMS Fury.
