= Convoy HX 133 =

World War II HX convoy

Convoy HX.133
- Part of World War II
Date	16 June 1941 – 3 July 1941
Location	North Atlantic
Result	German victory

Belligerents
(Nazi Germany) Germany	United Kingdom; Canada

Commanders and leaders
Admiral Karl Dönitz	

Strength
~4 U-boats	64 merchant ships 20 escorts

Casualties and losses
	6 ships sunk 7 damaged 107 killed

Convoy HX 133 was the 133rd of the numbered series of World War II HX convoys of merchant ships from HalifaX to Liverpool. The ships departed Halifax on 16 June 1941, and were found on 23 June by U-boats of the 1st U-boat Flotilla, operating out of Brest, France. U-boats sank six ships before the convoy reached Liverpool on 3 July. There was strong criticism of the RCN corvette's signalling capabilities as borne out by the number of collisions that occurred.

== Ships in the Convoy ==
Name	Flag	Tonnage (GRT)	Notes
Anadara (1935)	United Kingdom	8,009	Joined ex convoy BHX 133
HMCS Annapolis (I04)	(Canada) Royal Canadian Navy		Escort 16 Jun – 20 Jun
HMS Arabis (K73)	Royal Navy		Escort 27 Jun
Atlantic City (1941)	United Kingdom	5,133	
Baltara (1918)	United Kingdom	3,292	
Bello (1930)	Norway	6,125	Possibly via Convoy BB 41
British Progress (1927)	United Kingdom	4,581	
British Workman (1922)	United Kingdom	6,994	
Brockley Hill (1919)	United Kingdom	5,297	Sunk by U-651 SE of Cape Farewell, Greenland. All crew rescued.
HMS Celandine (K75)	Royal Navy		Escort 27 Jun – 30 Jun
Ceronia (1929)	United Kingdom	4,955	Joined ex convoy BHX 133
HMCS Chambly (K116)	(Canada) Royal Canadian Navy		Escort – 27 Jun; Corvette
City Of Oxford (1926)	United Kingdom	2,759	Joined ex convoy BHX 133, collision 19 Jun, returned
Cliona (1931)	United Kingdom	8,375	As station oiler at Reykjavík until April 1942
HMCS Collingwood (K180)	(Canada) Royal Canadian Navy		Escort 20 Jun – 27 Jun
Colytto (1926)	Netherlands	4,408	
Corbis (1931)	United Kingdom	8,132	Joined ex convoy BHX 133
Dalhousie (1940)	United Kingdom	7,072	
Debrett (1940)	United Kingdom	6,244	2 passengers
Dolabella (1939)	United Kingdom	8,142	Returned to Halifax after collision on 19 Jun
Dornoch (1939)	United Kingdom	5,186	
Emma Bakke (1929)	Norway	4,721	Returned
Empire Granite (1941)	Royal Navy	8,028	Joined ex convoy BHX 133
Empire Oil (1941)	United Kingdom	8,029	
Empire Salvage (1941)		10,746	Originally the Dutch Papendrecht, requisitioned by the Kriegsmarine in 1941 and renamed Lothringen to support naval operations by the German battleship Bismarck and cruiser Prinz Eugen in the Atlantic. Captured the Allies in June 1941 and renamed Empire Salvage.
Erviken (1921)	Norway	6,595	
Everleigh (1930)	United Kingdom	5,222	
HMS Fleetwood (U47)	Royal Navy		Escort 27 Jun – 27 Jun; Sloop
HMS Gladiolus (K34)	Royal Navy		Escort 27 Jun – 27 Jun; Corvette
Glenpark (1939)	United Kingdom	5,136	Capt R Gill CBE RD RNR (Commodore)
Grayburn (1938)	United Kingdom	6,342	Sunk by U-651 S of Iceland. 35 of her 53 crew lost. Survivors rescued by HMS Arabis, HMT Northern Wave and HMS Violet
Hartlebury (1934)	United Kingdom	5,082	
Havprins (1935)	Norway	8,066	Motor tanker
Henry Dundas (1937)	United Kingdom	10,448	Joined ex convoy BHX 133
HMS Icarus (D03)	Royal Navy		Escort. Destroyer
Inverilen (1938)	United Kingdom	9,456	3 passengers
Inverlee (1938)	United Kingdom	9,158	Joined ex convoy BHX 133. Bound for Scapa Flow
Kongsgaard (1937)	Norway	9,467	Torpedoed amidships by U-564 and caught fire on 27 Jun. The crew partially abandoned her, but the remaining crew were able to extinguish the fire and she arrived safely into Belfast on 2 Jul
Loch Ranza (1934)	United Kingdom	4,958	
Lowther Castle (1937)	United Kingdom	5,171	
Maasdam (1921)	Netherlands	8,812	Sunk by U-564 300 nautical miles (560 km) S of Iceland. 32 passengers. Only 2 people were lost of the 80 persons on board; rescued by Havprins
Malaya II (1921)	United Kingdom	8,651	Sunk by U-564 E of Cape Farewell, Greenland. 41 of 49 crew lost. Survivors rescued by HMS Collingwood
HMS Malcolm (D19)	Royal Navy		Escort 27 Jun – 30 Jun; Destroyer
HMS Maplin	Royal Navy		Escort
Mooncrest (1941)	United Kingdom	5,202	Vice Commodore
Nailsea Manor (1937)	United Kingdom	4,926	Returned to St John's, Newfoundland after collision
HMS Nasturtium (K107)	Royal Navy		Escort 27 Jun – 29 Jun; Corvette
HMS Niger (J73)	Royal Navy		Escort 27 Jun; Minesweeper
HMS Northern Gem (FY194)	Royal Navy		Escort; ASW trawler
HMS Northern Pride (FY105)	Royal Navy		Escort; ASW trawler
HMS Northern Wave (FY153)	Royal Navy		Escort; ASW trawler
Oakworth (1925)	United Kingdom	4,968	
HMCS Orillia (K119)	(Canada) Royal Canadian Navy		Escort 20 Jun – 27 Jun; Corvette
HMCS Ottawa (H60)	(Canada) Royal Canadian Navy		Escort 20 Jun – 27 Jun; Destroyer
HMS Polyanthus (K47)	Royal Navy		Escort 23 Jun – 27 Jun; Corvette
Primero (1925)	Norway	4,414	Joined ex convoy BHX 133, collision 19 Jun, returned
Randa (1930)	Canada	1,555	Straggled 27 Jun, to Reykjavík
HMS Ripley (G79)	Royal Navy		Escort 27 Jun – 29 Jun; Destroyer
Salamis (1939)	Norway	8,286	
San Delfino (1938)	United Kingdom	8,072	Joined ex convoy BHX 133
Saugor (1928)	United Kingdom	6,303	2 passengers
HMS Scimitar (H21)	Royal Navy		Escort 27 Jun – 30 Jun
Scottish Trader (1938)	United Kingdom	4,016	
Skeldergate (1930)	United Kingdom	4,251	Returned to Halifax after collision on 19 Jun
Soløy (1929)	Norway	4,402	Joined ex convoy BHX 133. Sunk by U-203. All 32 crew rescued by Traveller.
Southgate (1926)	United Kingdom	4,862	
HMS Speedwell (J87)	Royal Navy		Escort 27 Jun; Minesweeper
HMCS St. Croix (I81)	(Canada) Royal Canadian Navy		Escort 17 Jun – 20 Jun; Destroyer
St Rosario (1937)	United Kingdom	4,312	Joined ex convoy BHX 133
Stylianos Chandris (1919)	Greece	6,059	Returned
Tibia (1939)	Netherlands	10,356	Damaged by torpedo
Tornus (1936)	United Kingdom	8,054	Joined ex convoy BHX 133
Traveller (1922)	United Kingdom	3,963	
Trefusis (1918)	United Kingdom	5,299	
Treworlas (1922)	United Kingdom	4,692	
Tricula (1936)	United Kingdom	6,221	
Ulysses (1918)	Netherlands	2,666	
Vigrid (1923)	Norway	4,765	10 passengers. Straggler; Sunk by U-371 400 nautical miles (740 km) SE of Cape Farewell, Greenland. 28 of 49 people lost.
HMS Violet (K35)	Royal Navy		Escort 27 Jun – 30 Jun; Corvette
Voco (1925)	United Kingdom	5,090	
HMS Watchman (D26)	Royal Navy		Escort 27 Jun – 30 Jun; Destroyer
Winkleigh (1940)	United Kingdom	5,468	
Winsum (1921)	Netherlands	3,224	
HMS Wolfe (F37)	Royal Navy		Escort 16 Jun – 27 Jun
Zaafaran (1921)	United Kingdom	1,559	Rescue ship

== Bibliography ==
- Hague, Arnold (2000). The Allied Convoy System 1939–1945. ISBN 1-86176-147-3.
