= SS Brockley Hill =

SS Brockley Hill has been the name of two ships belonging to Counties Ship Management (CSM) of London, England:

- SS Brockley Hill (1918), completed in 1918, acquired by CSM and renamed Brockley Hill in 1939 and sunk by enemy action in 1941
- SS Brockley Hill (1943), completed in 1943, acquired by CSM and renamed Brockley Hill in 1947, sold and renamed again in 1950–51 and scrapped in 1966
