= SL convoys =

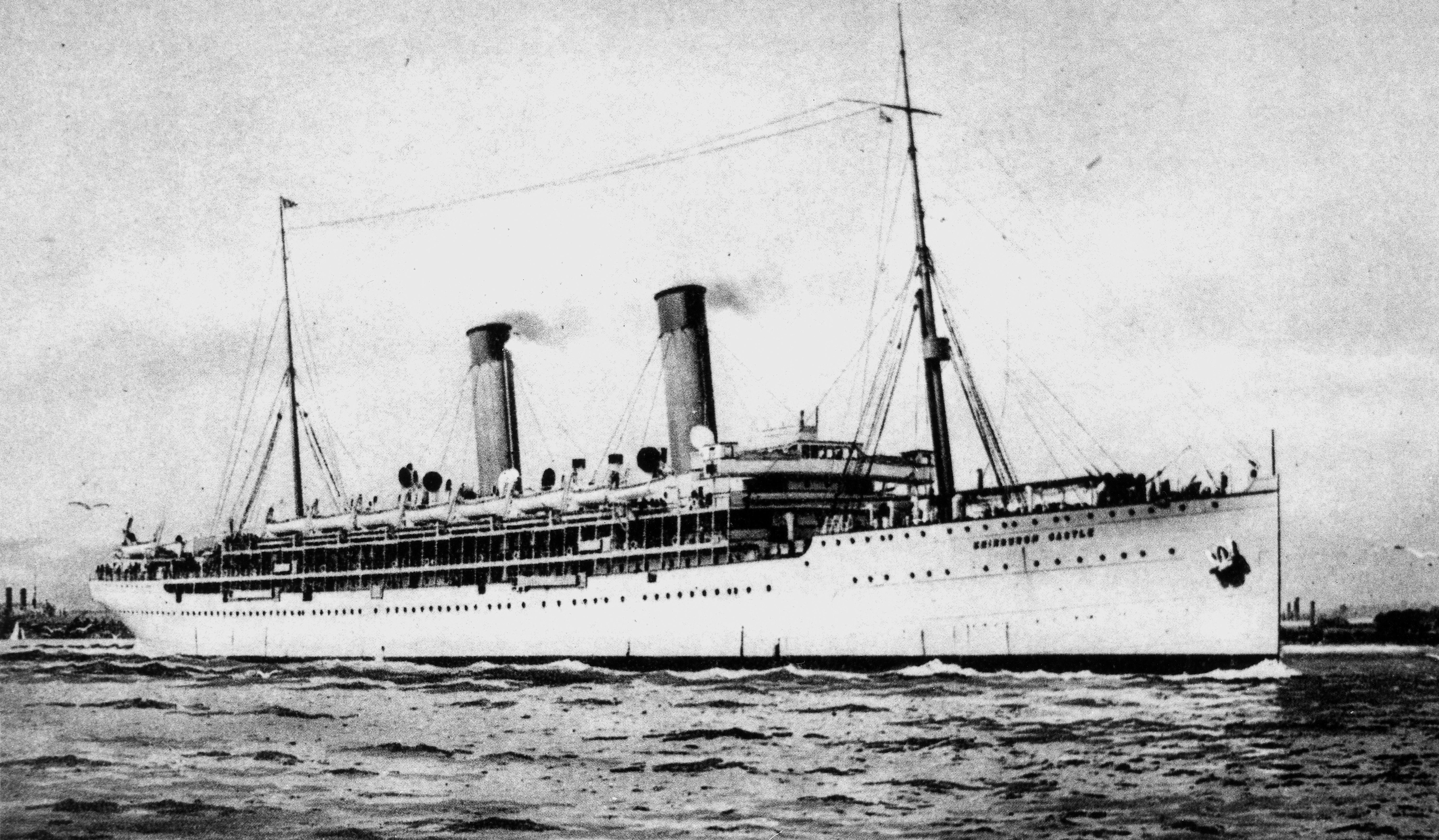
RMS Edinburgh Castle served as assembly headquarters for the SL convoys. She was not worth the cost of towing back to England, and was sunk as a target off Freetown in 1945.

SL convoys were a numbered series of North Atlantic trade convoys in the Second World War. Merchant ships carrying commodities bound to the British Isles from South America, Africa, and the Indian Ocean traveled independently to Freetown, Sierra Leone to be convoyed for the last leg of their voyage to Liverpool.

== History ==
Based on World War I experience, SL convoys were one of four trade convoy routes organized at the beginning of the Battle of the Atlantic. The other routes were HX convoys from North America, HG convoys from the Mediterranean, and a short-lived series of HN convoys from Norway. Eight ships sailed as convoy SL 1 on 14 September 1939 and three faster ships sailed six days later as a faster section -- sometimes designated SL(F) 1 or SL 1(F). The slower convoy was sometimes similarly suffixed with an (S). Early convoys were usually accompanied by an armed merchant cruiser or one of the South Atlantic Station cruisers based at Freetown; but no anti-submarine screen was provided until the slower and faster sections rendezvoused with a single Escort Group in the Southwest Approaches.

Freetown was little more than a protected anchorage, with no shore facilities. The town had been established as a resettlement area for freed slaves, with negligible European development. Convoy operations were coordinated by a naval staff aboard the elderly Union-Castle Liner Edinburgh Castle. Edinburgh Castle and a hospital ship anchored as far offshore as practicable to avoid the unhealthy conditions ashore. Tropical diseases were endemic in the oppressive heat and humidity. Local fresh water supplies were polluted. Refueling coal from the United Kingdom and oil from the West Indies was held and distributed afloat in detained merchant ships. Shore facilities were inadequate to support anti-submarine escorts for convoys until January 1941. Air cover was flown from Cornwall, Gibraltar, and Freetown when conditions allowed; but a northern Azores air gap and a southern Canaries air gap remained where U-boats and surface raiders could patrol the convoy routes unobserved. The northern gap was closed when air patrols began flying from the Azores in October 1943.

Convoy SL 125 sailed on 16 October 1942 before Operation Torch discontinued sailings from Freetown. Shipping was routed along the east coast of the Americas to Halifax until convoy SL 126 sailed from Freetown on 12 March 1943. Convoy SL 128 merged with convoy MKS 12 off Gibraltar in April 1943 to be designated SL 128/MKS 12 and all subsequent SL convoys had a similar joint designation format. The effective range of U-boats was decreased by Allied capture of French Atlantic seaports in 1944. The reduced threat of submarine attack off the African Atlantic coast allowed merchant ships to sail independently to Gibraltar after convoy SL 178/MKS 69 left Freetown on 25 November 1944.

== OS convoys ==
From 7 September 1939, OutBound OB convoys had sailed from Liverpool south through St George's Channel to the open Atlantic. OB convoys were escorted for about four days from Land's End before the convoy would disperse and individual ships proceed independently to their destinations. As U-boats found and sank increasing numbers of ships dispersed from OB convoys, OB convoys were replaced by ON convoys and by OS convoys formed of ships Outbound to the South Atlantic and escorted all the way to Freetown. Convoy OS 1 sailed from Liverpool on 24 July 1941, and reached Freetown on 10 August. An escort group would screen a southbound OS convoy and return with a northbound SL convoy. Convoy OS 40 reached Freetown on 27 September 1942, but following convoys OS 41 and OS 42 dispersed at sea; and OS convoys were suspended by Operation Torch until convoy OS 43 left Liverpool on 14 February 1943. Convoy OS 46 was combined with convoy KMS 13 of ships detaching off Gibraltar with the joint designation OS 46/MKS 13. Sailings from Liverpool continued under the joint designations until convoy OS 130/KMS 105 on 27 May 1945; but, as the Mediterranean route became safe for Indian Ocean destinations, convoy OS 92/KMS 66 was the last to proceed as far as Freetown on 4 November 1944.

== Convoy battles ==
- SL 7 lost Arlington Court torpedoed by U-43 on 16 November 1939.
- SL 8 lost Royston Grange torpedoed by U-28 on 25 November 1939.
- SL 34 lost two ships torpedoed by U-46 on 12 June 1940.
- SL 36 lost two ships torpedoed by U-43 on 30 June 1940 and by U-30 on 1 July.
- SL 43 lost Theodoros T. torpedoed by U-37 and the escort HMS Dunvegan Castle torpedoed by U-46 on 27 August 1940.
- SL 44 lost St. Glen bombed by aircraft on 6 September 1940.
- SL 45 lost Nailsea River bombed by aircraft on 15 September 1940.
- SL 52 lost Nalon bombed by aircraft on 6 November 1940.
- SL 53 lost Apapa bombed by aircraft on 15 November 1940.
- SL 64 lost seven ships sunk by the German cruiser Admiral Hipper on 12 February 1941.
- SL 67 lost five ships torpedoed by U-105 and U-124 on 8 March 1941 but presence of HMS Malaya prevented attack by German battleships Scharnhorst and Gneisenau.
- SL 68 lost six ships torpedoed by U-105 and U-106 in March 1941.
- SL 69 lost Swedru bombed by aircraft on 16 April 1941.
- SL 72 lost Somerset bombed by aircraft on 11 May 1941.
- SL 73 lost Starcross torpedoed by the Italian submarine Otaria on 20 May 1941.
- SL 76 lost two ships torpedoed by the Italian submarine Brin on 13 June 1941.
- SL 78 lost four ships torpedoed by U-69 and U-123 on 26 and 27 June 1941.
- OS 1 lost Botwey torpedoed by U-141 on 26 July 1941.
- SL 81 lost five ships torpedoed by three U-boats on 5 August 1941. Escorts sank U-401 and shot down a Focke-Wulf Fw 200 Condor.
- OS 4 lost four ships torpedoed by U-557 on 27 August 1941 and another torpedoed by U-558 the following day.
- SL 85 lost Daru bombed by aircraft on 15 September 1941.
- SL 87 lost seven ships torpedoed by four U-boats in September 1941.
- SL 89 lost two ships torpedoed by U-82 on 21 October 1941.
- OS 10 lost Bennekom torpedoed by U-96 on 31 October 1941. Lothar-Günther Buchheim was aboard U-96, and the battle provided inspiration for the film Das Boot.
- OS 12 lost Thornliebank torpedoed by U-43 on 29 November 1941.
- SL 97 escort sank U-93 on 15 January 1942.
- SL 98 U-105 sank escort HMS Culver on 31 January 1942.
- OS 18 escort vessels HMS Rochester and HMS Tamarisk sank U-82 on 6 February 1942.
- SL 109 lost Denpark torpedoed by U-128 on 12 May 1942.
- OS 28 lost two ships torpedoed by U-159 on 21 May 1942.
- OS 33 lost seven ships torpedoed by three U-boats, and escort sank U-136 on 12 July 1942.
- SL 115 escort sank the Italian submarine Pietro Calvi on 14 July 1942.
- OS 34 lost two ships torpedoed by U-564 on 19 July 1942.
- SL 118 lost four ships torpedoed by three U-boats in August 1942.
- SL 119 lost two ships torpedoed by U-566 on 28 August 1942.
- SL 125 was used as a tactical diversion to clear U-boats from the path of troopship convoys for Operation Torch. Twelve ships sunk with 426 dead in the final days of October, 1942, constituted the largest loss from any SL convoy.
- OS 44 lost four ships torpedoed by U-107 on 13 March 1943.
- SL 126 lost four ships torpedoed by U-404 and U-662 in March 1943.
- OS 45 lost two ships torpedoed by U-124 on 2 April 1943.
- SL 128/MKS 12 lost Laconikos torpedoed by U-89 on 7 May 1943.
- SL 129/MKS 13 lost Alpera bombed by aircraft on 22 May 1943.
- SL 131/MKS 15 lost two ships bombed by aircraft on 23 June 1943.
- OS 52/KMS 21 lost two ships bombed by aircraft on 26 and 27 July 1943.
- OS 58/KMS 32 lost Warfield bombed by aircraft on 15 August 1943.
- SL 135/MKS 22 escort sank U-634 on 30 August 1943.
- SL 138/MKS 28 lost Hallfried torpedoed by U-262 on 31 October 1943, and escorts sank U-306.
- SL 139/MKS 30 escorts sank three U-boats in November 1943, and U-boats shot down two bombers.
- SL 140/MKS 31 escorts sank three U-boats in November 1943, and U-boats shot down two bombers.
- OS 62/KMS 36 lost HMS Hurricane torpedoed by U-415 on 24 December 1944.
- OS 64/KMS 38 lost HMS Tweed torpedoed by U-305 on 3 January 1944, and U-270 shot down a bomber.
- OS 65/KMS 39 escort sank U-641 on 19 January 1944.
- SL 147/MKS 38 escorts sank five U-boats in January 1944.
- SL 149/MKS 40 lost LST-362 torpedoed by U-744 on 2 March 1944.
- SL 150/MKS 41 lost HMS Asphodel torpedoed by U-575 on 6 March 1944.
- OS 115/KMS 89 lost Lornaston torpedoed by U-275 on 8 March 1945.
