= German submarine U-651 =

German World War II submarine

Coordinates: 59°52′N 18°36′W

History

Nazi Germany
- Name: U-651
- Ordered: 9 October 1939
- Builder: Howaldtswerke Hamburg AG
- Yard number: 800
- Laid down: 16 January 1940
- Launched: 21 December 1940
- Commissioned: 12 February 1941
- Fate: Sunk on 29 June 1941

General characteristics
- Class & type: Type VIIC submarine
- Displacement: 769 tonnes (757 long tons) surfaced; 871 t (857 long tons) submerged
- Length: 67.10 m (220 ft 2 in) o/a; 50.50 m (165 ft 8 in) pressure hull
- Beam: 6.20 m (20 ft 4 in) o/a; 4.70 m (15 ft 5 in) pressure hull
- Height: 9.60 m (31 ft 6 in)
- Draught: 4.74 m (15 ft 7 in)
- Installed power: 2,800–3,200 PS (2,100–2,400 kW; 2,800–3,200 bhp) (diesels); 750 PS (550 kW; 740 shp) (electric)
- Propulsion: 2 shafts; 2 × diesel engines; 2 × electric motors
- Speed: 17.7 knots (32.8 km/h; 20.4 mph) surfaced; 7.6 knots (14.1 km/h; 8.7 mph) submerged
- Range: 8,500 nmi (15,700 km; 9,800 mi) at 10 knots (19 km/h; 12 mph) surfaced; 80 nmi (150 km; 92 mi) at 4 knots (7.4 km/h; 4.6 mph) submerged
- Test depth: 230 m (750 ft); Crush depth: 250–295 m (820–968 ft)
- Complement: 4 officers, 40–56 enlisted
- Armament: 4 × 53.3 cm (21 in) torpedo tubes in the bow; 14 × torpedoes or 26 TMA mines; 1 × 8.8 cm (3.46 in) deck gun (220 rounds); 1 x 2 cm (0.79 in) C/30 AA gun

Service record
- Part of: 1st U-boat Flotilla; 12 February – 29 June 1941
- Identification codes: M 35 647
- Commanders: Kptlt. Peter Lohmeyer; 12 February – 29 June 1941
- Operations: 1 patrol: 12 – 29 June 1941
- Victories: 2 merchant ships sunk (11,639 GRT)

German submarine U-651 was a German Type VIIC U-boat built for Nazi Germany's Kriegsmarine for service during World War II. She was ordered just after the war started in 1939, laid down on 16 January 1940, launched on 21 December that year and commissioned the following 21 February. She was commanded by Kapitänleutnant Peter Lohmeyer.

Her career was a short one. She took part in only one patrol and sank two ships in convoy Convoy HX 133: the merchantmen Brockley Hill and Grayburn. On 29 June 1941, she was sunk by the escort for the same convoy but 45 of her crew were rescued by the Royal Navy and interrogated by the Admiralty.

== Design ==
German Type VIIC submarines were preceded by the shorter Type VIIB submarines. U-651 had a displacement of 769 tonnes (757 long tons) when at the surface and 871 tonnes (857 long tons) while submerged. She had a total length of 67.10 m (220 ft 2 in), a pressure hull length of 50.50 m (165 ft 8 in), a beam of 6.20 m (20 ft 4 in), a height of 9.60 m (31 ft 6 in), and a draught of 4.74 m (15 ft 7 in). The submarine was powered by two Germaniawerft F46 four-stroke, six-cylinder supercharged diesel engines producing a total of 2,800 to 3,200 metric horsepower (2,060 to 2,350 kW; 2,760 to 3,160 shp) for use while surfaced, two Siemens-Schuckert GU 343/38-8 double-acting electric motors producing a total of 750 metric horsepower (550 kW; 740 shp) for use while submerged. She had two shafts and two 1.23 m (4 ft) propellers. The boat was capable of operating at depths of up to 230 metres (750 ft).

The submarine had a maximum surface speed of 17.7 knots (32.8 km/h; 20.4 mph) and a maximum submerged speed of 7.6 knots (14.1 km/h; 8.7 mph). When submerged, the boat could operate for 80 nautical miles (150 km; 92 mi) at 4 knots (7.4 km/h; 4.6 mph); when surfaced, she could travel 8,500 nautical miles (15,700 km; 9,800 mi) at 10 knots (19 km/h; 12 mph). U-651 was fitted with five 53.3 cm (21 in) torpedo tubes (four fitted at the bow and one at the stern), fourteen torpedoes, one 8.8 cm (3.46 in) SK C/35 naval gun, 220 rounds, and a 2 cm (0.79 in) C/30 anti-aircraft gun. The boat had a complement of between forty-four and sixty.

== Ships credited for the sinking of U-651 ==
Destroyers

- HMS Malcolm
- HMS Scimitar

Corvettes

- HMS Arabis
- HMS Violet

Minesweeper

- HMS Speedwell

== Summary of raiding history ==
Date	Ship Name	Nationality	Tonnage (GRT)	Fate
24 June 1941	Brockley Hill	United Kingdom	5,297	Sunk
29 June 1941	Grayburn	United Kingdom	6,342	Sunk

== Bibliography ==
- Busch, Rainer; Röll, Hans-Joachim (1999). German U-boat commanders of World War II : a biographical dictionary. Translated by Brooks, Geoffrey. London, Annapolis, Md: Greenhill Books, Naval Institute Press. ISBN 1-55750-186-6.
- Busch, Rainer; Röll, Hans-Joachim (1999). Der U-Boot-Krieg, 1939-1945: Deutsche U-Boot-Verluste von September 1939 bis Mai 1945 [German U-boat losses from September 1939 to May 1945] (in German). Vol. IV. Hamburg, Berlin, Bonn: Mittler. ISBN 3-8132-0514-2.
- Gröner, Eric; Jung, Dieter; Maass, Martin (1991). German Warships 1815-1945: U-boats and Mine Warfare Vessels. Vol. 2. Translated by Thomas, Keith; Magowan, Rachel. London: Conway Maritime Press. ISBN 0-85177-593-4.
