= Convoy SL 78 =

Convoy during naval battles of the Second World War

Convoy SL.78
- Part of World War II
Date	18 June 1941 – 12 July 1941
Location	North Atlantic

Belligerents
Germany	Royal Norwegian Navy; Royal Navy

Commanders and leaders
Admiral Karl Dönitz	Vice-Admiral G T C P Swabey CB DSO

Strength
~4 U-boats	26 merchant ships 19 escorts

Casualties and losses
	8 merchants sunk

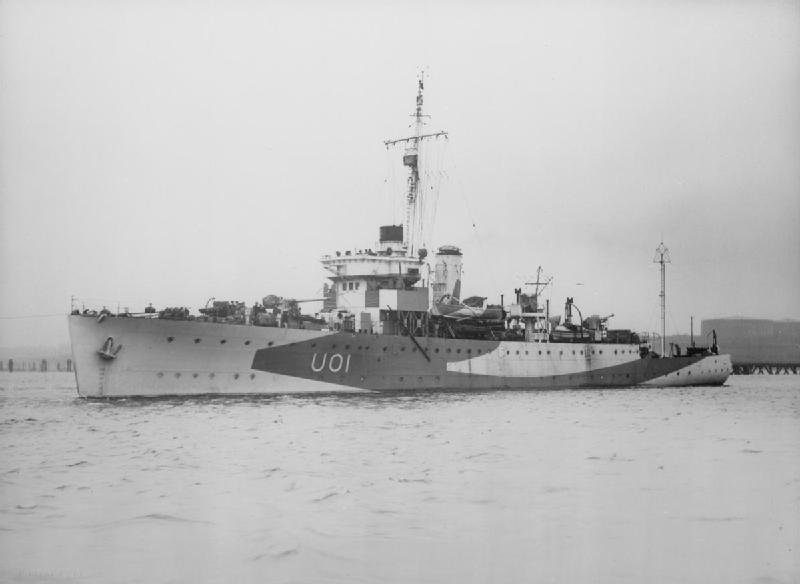
Convoy escort HMS Bridgewater

Convoy SL 78 was the 78th of the numbered series of World War II SL convoys of merchant ships from Sierra Leone to Liverpool. Ships carrying commodities bound for the British Isles from South America, Africa, and the Indian Ocean traveled independently to Freetown to be convoyed for the last leg of their voyage. Twenty-five merchant ships departed Freetown on 18 June 1941. U-boats sank eight ships before the convoy reached Liverpool on 12 July.

== Ships in the convoy ==
=== Allied merchant ships ===
A total of 26 merchant vessels joined the convoy, either in Sierra Leone or later in the voyage.

Name	Flag	Tonnage (GRT)	Notes
Aliakmon (1913)	Greece	4,521	
Arundo (1930)	Netherlands	5,163	
Atle Jarl (1919)	Norway	1,173	
Baron Napier (1930)	United Kingdom	3,559	
Batna (1928)	United Kingdom	4,399	
Blackheath (1936)	United Kingdom	4,637	Collision with corvette escort HMS Arbutus (K86) on 11 July
Camerata (1931)	United Kingdom	4,875	
Criton (1927)	United Kingdom	4,564	Captured from the Vichy French by HMS Cilicia on 19 June, and being sailed back to Europe from West Africa. Intercepted by two Vichy French warships, Air France IV and Edith Germaine, near Freetown on 21 June and sunk by their gunfire. (see also Commander Bernard Peter de Neumann GM RN, second time sunk in the space of one month)
Empire Ability (1931)	United Kingdom	7,603	Sunk by U-69
Esneh (1919)	United Kingdom	1,931	
George J Goulandris (1913)	Greece	4,345	Sunk by U-66 W of Canary Islands
Kalypso Vergotti (1918)	Greece	5,686	Straggler was sunk by U-66. All 36 crew lost
Keilehaven (1919)	Netherlands	2,968	
Leonidas N Condylis (1912)	Greece	3,923	
Mary Slessor (1930)	United Kingdom	5,027	Convoy Vice commodore's ship
Michael Jebsen (1927)	United Kingdom	2,323	Did Not Reform With Convoy
Oberon (1911)	Netherlands	1,996	Sunk by U-123
P.L.M.22 (1921)	United Kingdom	5,646	Sunk by U-123
Parthenon (1908)	Greece	3,189	
Rio Azul (1921)	United Kingdom	4,088	Sunk by U-123 post-dispersal from this convoy
River Lugar (1937)	United Kingdom	5,423	Sunk by U-69
Rolf Jarl (1920)	Norway	1,917	
Sobo (1937)	United Kingdom	5,353	Convoy commodore's ship – Vice-Admiral G T C P Swabey CB DSO
St Anselm (1919)	United Kingdom	5,614	Sunk by U-66
Stad Arnhem (1920)	Netherlands	3,819	Joined Convoy HX 135 after dispersal
Venus (1907)	Netherlands	1,855	

=== Convoy escorts ===
A series of armed military ships escorted the convoy at various times during its journey.

Name	Flag	Type	Joined	Left
HMS Arbutus (K86)	Royal Navy	Flower-class corvette	09 Jul 1941	11 Jul 1941
HMS Armeria (K187)	Royal Navy	Flower-class corvette	18 Jun 1941	28 Jun 1941
HMS Asphodel (K56)	Royal Navy	Flower-class corvette	18 Jun 1941	28 Jun 1941
HMS Aster (K188)	Royal Navy	Flower-class corvette	18 Jun 1941	28 Jun 1941
HMS Begonia (K66)	Royal Navy	Flower-class corvette	09 Jul 1941	12 Jul 1941
HMS Bridgewater (L01)	Royal Navy	Bridgewater-class sloop	18 Jun 1941	28 Jun 1941
HMS Burdock (K126)	Royal Navy	Flower-class corvette	18 Jun 1941	28 Jun 1941
HMS Chelsea (I35)	Royal Navy	Town-class destroyer	09 Jul 1941	12 Jul 1941
HMS Convolvulus (K45)	Royal Navy	Flower-class corvette	09 Jul 1941	12 Jul 1941
HMS Esperance Bay (F67)	Royal Navy	Armed merchant cruiser and troopship	18 Jun 1941	27 Jun 1941
HMS Fleur De Lys (K122)	Royal Navy	Flower-class corvette	30 Jun 1941	30 Jun 1941
HMS Jasmine (K23)	Royal Navy	Flower-class corvette	09 Jul 1941	12 Jul 1941
HMS Larkspur (K82)	Royal Navy	Flower-class corvette	09 Jul 1941	12 Jul 1941
HNoMS Mansfield (G76)	Royal Norwegian Navy	Town-class destroyer	09 Jul 1941	12 Jul 1941
HMS Pegasus	Royal Navy	Fighter catapult ship	09 Jul 1941	12 Jul 1941
HMS Pimpernel (K71)	Royal Navy	Flower-class corvette	09 Jul 1941	12 Jul 1941
HMS Rhododendron (K78)	Royal Navy	Flower-class corvette	09 Jul 1941	12 Jul 1941
HMS Shropshire (73)	Royal Navy	County-class heavy cruiser	26 Jun 1941	27 Jun 1941
HMS Verity (D63)	Royal Navy	Modified W-class destroyer	09 Jul 1941	12 Jul 1941

== Bibliography ==
- Blair, Clay (1996). Hitler's U-boat War:The Hunters 1939–1942. New York: Random House. ISBN 0-394-58839-8.
- Hague, Arnold (2000). The Allied Convoy System 1939–1945. Chatham. ISBN 1-86176-147-3.
