= SS Empire Asquith =

World War II merchant ship of the United Kingdom

History
- Name: Empire Asquith (1944–47); Brockley Hill (1947–51); Starcrest (1951–57); Argosy (1957–60); Nezihi Ipar (1960–70)
- Owner: Ministry of War Transport (1944–47); Brockley Hill Steamship Co Ltd (1947–50); Vandar Shipping Co Ltd (1950–51); Crest Shipping Co, Nassau (1951–57); Compagnia de Navigazione Phoenix, Panama (1957–58); Codemar Compagnia de Empresas Maritimas, Panama (1958–60); Ipar Transport Co, Istanbul (1960–70)
- Operator: Owner operated except:-; R Chapman & Son (1944–46); Counties Ship Management Ltd (1946–51); Ivanovich & Co Ltd, London (1951–57)
- Port of registry: (United Kingdom) Newcastle (1944–51); (The Bahamas) Nassau (1951–57); Liberia (1957–60); (Turkey) Istanbul (1960–70)
- Builder: Shipbuilding Corporation Ltd., Newcastle upon Tyne
- Yard number: 9
- Launched: 4 September 1944
- Completed: November 1944
- Identification: UK Official Number 169187 (1944–51); Code letters GFJN (1944–47)
- Fate: Scrapped August 1969

General characteristics
- Tonnage: 7,082 GRT
- Length: 430 ft 9 in (131.29 m)
- Beam: 56 ft 2 in (17.12 m)
- Depth: 35 ft 2 in (10.72 m)
- Propulsion: 1 x triple expansion steam engine (North East Marine Engineering Co (1938) Ltd, Newcastle) (542 hp (404 kW))

Empire Asquith was a 7,082 ton cargo ship which was built in 1944. In 1947 she was sold and renamed Brockley Hill. Further name changes were Starcrest in 1951, Argosy in 1957 and Nezihi Ipar in 1960. She was scrapped in 1970.

== History ==
=== Wartime ===
Empire Asquith was built by Shipbuilding Corporation Ltd, Newcastle upon Tyne. She was yard number 9, launched on 4 September 1944 and completed in November 1944. She was built for the Ministry of War Transport and managed by R Chapman & Son.

Empire Asquith was a member of a number of convoys during the Second World War.

SC167

Empire Asquith was a member of Convoy SC 167, which departed Halifax, Nova Scotia in mid February 1944 and arrived at Liverpool on 2 March. She was carrying a cargo of lumber bound for the Tyne.

=== Postwar ===
In 1946, management of Empire Asquith passed to Counties Ship Management (CSM). She was sold to the Brockley Hill Steamship Co Ltd in 1947, operating under CSM's management, and renamed to replace a previous SS Brockley Hill that had been sunk in 1941. In 1950 she was sold to Vandar Shipping Co Ltd who placed her under the management of Ivanovich & Co Ltd. She was sold to Crest Shipping Co in 1951 and was renamed Starcrest, remaining under Ivanovich's management. In 1957, she was sold to the Compagnia Navigazione Phoenix, Panama and renamed Argosy, being sold to the Codemar Compagnia de Empresas Maritimas, Panama the following year. In 1960, she was sold to Ipar Transport Co, Istanbul and was renamed Nezihi Ipar. The ship was laid up in Istanbul in 1962 and scrapped at Haliç in September 1970.

== Official number and code letters ==
Official Numbers were a forerunner to IMO Numbers.

Empire Asquith had the UK Official Number 169187 and used the Code Letters GFJN.
