= HMS Scimitar (H21) =

1918 S-class destroyer

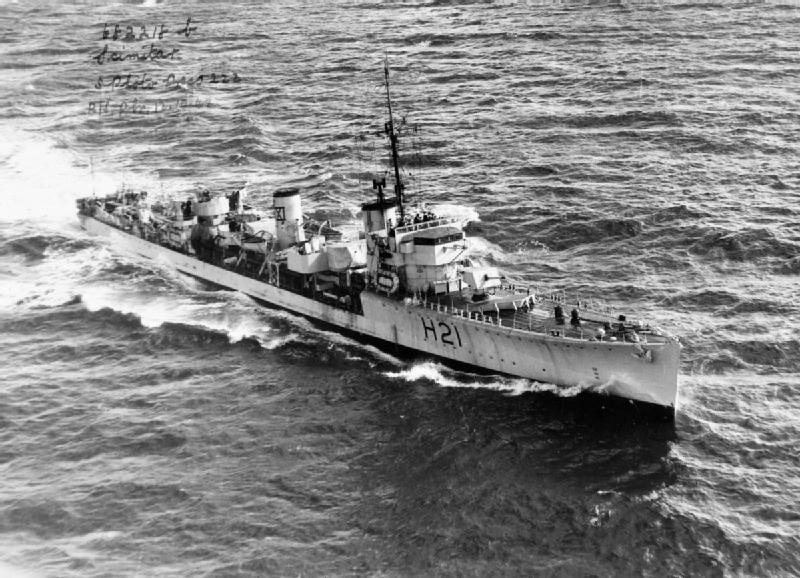
- Imperial War Museums collections

History

United Kingdom
- Name: HMS Scimitar
- Builder: John Brown & Company, Clydebank
- Yard number: 472
- Laid down: 30 May 1917
- Launched: 27 February 1918
- Decommissioned: 1947
- Fate: Scrapped

General characteristics
- Class & type: S-class destroyer
- Displacement: 1,075 long tons (1,092 t) normal; 1,221 long tons (1,241 t) deep load
- Length: 265 ft (80.8 m) p.p.
- Beam: 26 ft 8 in (8.13 m)
- Draught: 9 ft 10 in (3.00 m) mean
- Propulsion: 3 Yarrow boilers; 2 geared Brown-Curtis steam turbines, 27,000 shp (20,000 kW)
- Speed: 36 knots (41.4 mph; 66.7 km/h)
- Range: 2,750 nmi (5,090 km) at 15 kn (28 km/h)
- Complement: 90
- Armament: 3 × QF 4-inch (101.6 mm) Mark IV guns, mounting P Mk. IX; 1 × single 2-pounder (40-mm) "pom-pom" Mk. II anti-aircraft gun; 4 × 21 in (533 mm) torpedo tubes (2×2); 2 x 18 in (457 mm) torpedo tubes

HMS Scimitar was an S-class destroyer which served with the Royal Navy and the first ship in the Royal Navy named after the Scimitar, an Arabian backsword or sabre with a curved blade. She served in both World Wars and following a National Savings campaign in 1942 she was adopted by the civil community of Pershore, Worcestershire.

== Design and construction ==
=== Design ===
Scimitar was ordered from John Brown & Company of Clydebank in April 1917, the S class was intended as a fast 36-knot (67 km/h; 41 mph) destroyer for service that would be cheaper than the large V-class destroyers.

The class had two funnels, a long forecastle and a tall, open bridge, located behind the break in the main deck. The class was built in two batches, the first 33 ordered on 9 April 1917 and the second batch of 36 in June 1917, with Scimitar from the first batch. She was laid down at Clydebank on 30 May 1917 and launched on 27 Feb 1918.

== World War I ==
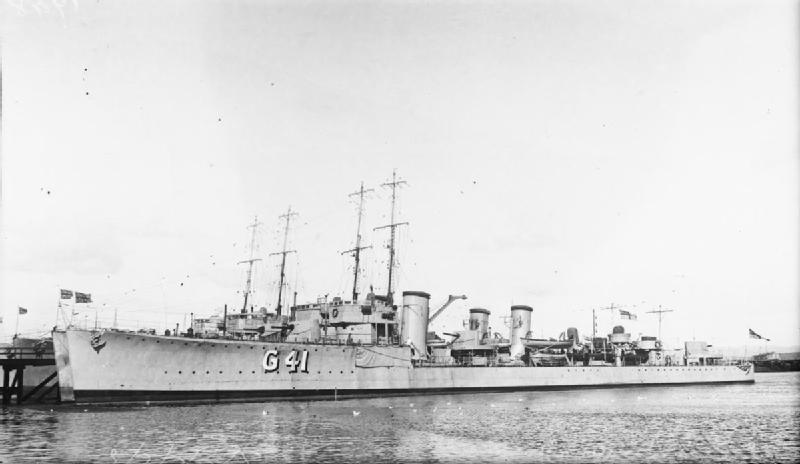
HMS Scimitar bearing pennant G41

Given the pennant number G41, Scimitar was completed on 13 April 1918. She served briefly with the Grand Fleet.

Although she was active before the armistice, she took no part in the War and was reduced to the Reserve Fleet at Devonport in August 1920, then paid off to the Maintenance Reserve in Rosyth in October 1927. She recommissioned at Rosyth on 2 June 1931 before being reduced to reserve again at The Nore in September 1936.

In 1938 she was deployed with the Portsmouth Local Flotilla and used for training.

== World War II ==
=== 1939 ===
Scimitar was assigned to convoy defence in the English Channel, then escorted a convoy from Southampton to Brest with the destroyer HMS Vansittart. From late October to early December she was withdrawn from operational duties and modified for minesweeping.

=== 1940 ===
In May she assisted in the evacuation of Allied troops from Dunkirk where she collided with the destroyer Icarus sustaining damage to her propellers after grounding. In June, while under repair in Portland, she suffered minor damage during an air raid. In July she embarked troops of No. 3 Commando at Dartmouth for an abortive raid on Guernsey. She transferred to the Western Approaches for Atlantic Convoy HX 72 and in September helped drive off an attack by the German submarine U-32.

=== 1941 ===
In March Scimitar was part of the escort for Convoy HX112 with the destroyers Walker, Vanoc, Volunteer, and six Flower-class corvettes, including Bluebell. In June U-100 was spotted on the surface by radar and sunk by the escorts. In June Scimitar was with the 8th Escort Group as part of Convoy HX 133 and helped sink U-651. In August she escorted Convoy HX 143 with the destroyers Malcolm, Watchman and six Flower-class corvettes. During October and November Scimitar deployed for escort of Convoys ON 30 and HX 160 for outward passage to the Mid-Ocean Meeting Point (MOMP).

=== 1942 ===
In January Scimitar was transferred to the 1st Escort Group for her continuation of Atlantic escort duties, based at Londonderry with the destroyer Sabre and the corvette Alisma. The group escorted 13 convoys, many without loss and conducted anti-submarine exercises around Lough Foyle.

=== 1943 ===
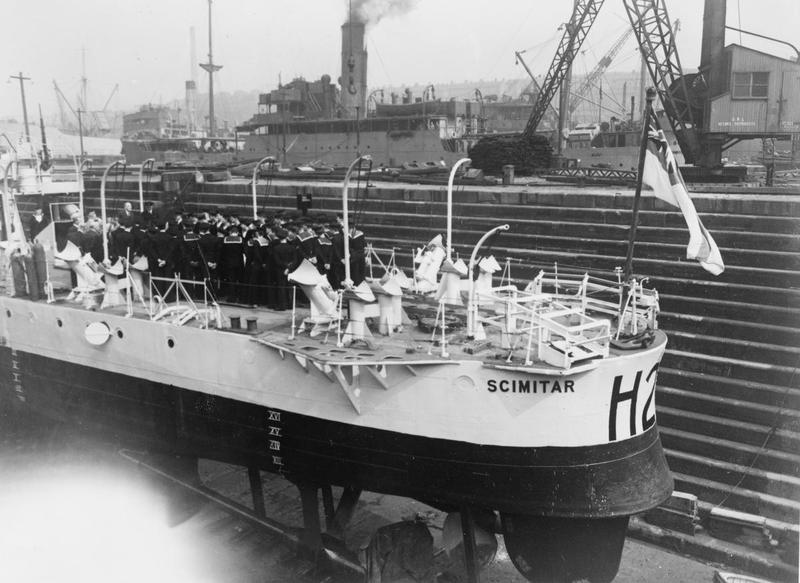
Pershore presents a plaque to HMS Scimitar on her 25th birthday at Liverpool on 5 May 1943

Transferred to 21st Escort Group in January with the destroyers Saladin, Skate and Sabre for escort of UK-Iceland convoys, till July when she sustained damage in heavy weather conditions and was withdrawn from for repair until September. She then deployed with the destroyers Lancaster, Sardonyx and Meteor as escort for the minelayers Agamemnon, Menestheus and Port Quebec during Northern Barrage Minelaying (Operation SN222B). In October Scimitar was withdrawn for Atlantic escort duties due to her age and that new ships were available for ocean escort duties. She transferred to Plymouth for Channel escort.

=== 1944 ===
On 20 February she deployed with the destroyer Warwick in search for a submarine reported in the Southwest Approaches. During the search, Warwick was hit by a T5 homing torpedo from U-413 while she was off Trevose Head, Cornwall and quickly sank after her depth charges, which were primed in anticipation of an attack, exploded. Scimitar rescued 93 survivors.

In April, Scimitar was deployed in support of exercises in preparation for the Allied landings in Normandy. On 26 April, while escorting a convoy of US landing ships to Slapton Sands (Exercise Tiger), she was involved in a collision with a Landing Ship, Tank and sustained structural damage. Scimitar retired from the exercise and sailed to Plymouth for repairs. In October she was withdrawn from operational service and assigned a training role based at Plymouth.

== Convoys escorted ==
DB 005, SA 015, SA 017, HX 053, CW 007, OB 208, SC 002, OL 003, HX 072, OA 219, HX 074, OB 223, HX 076, OB 232, SC 008, HX 088, OB 252, SC 013, OB 259, HX 094, OB 266, SL 059, HX 098/1, SC 019, SL 062, OG 053, OB 295, HX 112, OB 301, HG 056, OB 311, OB 312, SC 028, SC 029, HX 124, OB 322, HX 126, HX 128, OB 338, HX 133, SC 036, ON 001, HX 140, ON 006, HX 143, ON 037, HX 160, HX 166, SL 097G, ON 060, HX 172, SC 070 DS 024, SD 024, TA 012, SL 103, UR 019, RU 019, DS 026, SD 026, UR 025, RU 025, UR 028, RU 028, UR 030, UR 031, RU 030, RU 031, UR 046, KMF 003, SC 109, SC 112, ON 049, DS 036, SD 036, PW 292, DS 041, SD 041, DS 043, SD 043, DS 045, SD 045, DS 046, SD 046, DS 047, SD 047, HX 274, WP SP 20, WP 493, WP 504, WP 505, WP 508, WP 509, WP 512
