= SS Burgondier =

Cargo steamship sunk during World War II

Coordinates: 58.30°N 38.20°W

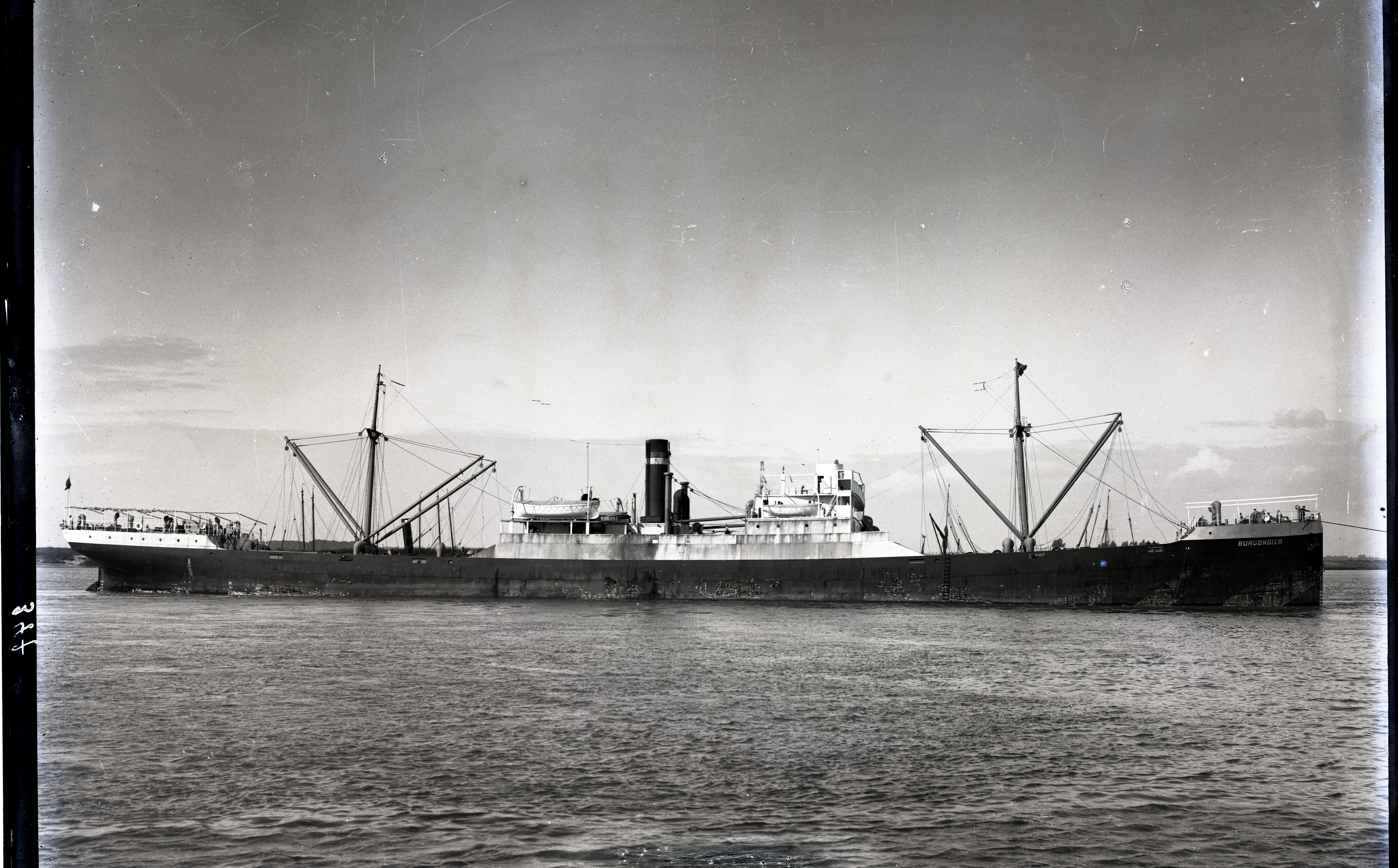
- Burgondier

History
- Name: War Burman (1919); Burgondier (1919–26); Azul (1926–36); David Dawson (1936–37); Penteli (1937–39); Brockley Hill (1939–41)
- Owner: Lloyd Royal Belge (GB) Ltd (1919–23); Compagnie Maritime Belge SA (1923–26); Buenos Aires Great Southern Railway (1926–35); Kaye, Son & Co Ltd (1935–36); Georgian Steam Navigation Co Ltd (1936–37); J A Coulouthros and N N Embiricos (1937–39); Brockley Hill Steamship Co Ltd (1939–41)
- Operator: Lloyd Royal Belge (GB) Ltd (1919–23); Compagnie Maritime Belge SA (1923–26); A Holland & Co Ltd (1926–35); Kaye, Son & Co Ltd (1935–36); Frank S Dawson & Co Ltd (1936–37); J A Coulouthros and N N Embiricos (1937–39); Counties Ship Management (1939–41)
- Port of registry: (United Kingdom) London, UK (1919–23); Antwerp, Belgium (1923–26); (United Kingdom) London (1926–37); Andros, Greece (1937–39); (United Kingdom) London (1939–41)
- Builder: Caird & Company, Greenock
- Yard number: 353
- Launched: 17 October 1918
- Completed: April 1919
- Out of service: 12 June 1941
- Identification: UK official number 142712 (1918–23, 1926–37, 1939–41); code letters KVQM (1926–33); Call sign GMVT (1930–37); call sign SVVR (1937–39); call sign GGRN (1939–41)
- Fate: Sunk by torpedo

General characteristics
- Class & type: Shipping Controller class F1
- Type: cargo ship
- Tonnage: 5,287 GRT, 3,200 NRT
- Length: 400.1 ft (122.0 m)
- Beam: 52.3 ft (15.9 m)
- Depth: 28.5 ft (8.7 m)
- Decks: 1
- Installed power: 3-cylinder triple expansion steam engine; 517 NHP
- Propulsion: single screw
- Speed: 12 knots (22 km/h)

Position off Greenland where Brockley Hill was sunk.

SS Burgondier was a 5,297-ton cargo steamship built to a First World War standard design by Caird & Company at Greenock on the Firth of Clyde. She changed owners and names several times, becoming the Azul, David Dawson, Penteli and finally Brockley Hill. She was sunk by enemy action in 1941.

== Propulsion ==
The ship had nine corrugated furnaces with a combined grate area of 196 square feet (18 m^{2}) heating three 180 lb_{f}/in^{2} single-ended boilers with a combined heating surface of 7,668 square feet (712 m^{2}). The boilers fed a Caird & Company three-cylinder triple expansion steam engine rated at 517 NHP that drove a single screw.

== Peacetime career ==
Caird & Co launched the ship as War Burman but completed her in April 1919 as Burgondier for Lloyd Royal Belge (GB) Ltd, which registered her in London. In 1923 she was transferred to Compagnie Maritime Belge (Lloyd Royal) SA and registered in Antwerp, Belgium.

In 1926 she was sold to Buenos Aires Great Southern Railway Co, who registered her in London as Azul and placed her under the management of A. Holland & Co. In 1935 she was sold to Kaye, Son & Co, who sold her on in 1936. Her new owners, Georgian Steam Navigation Co Ltd renamed her David Dawson and placed her under the management of Frank S. Dawson and Co Ltd. In 1937 she was sold to J.A. Coulouthros and N.N. Embiricos, Andros who registered her in Greece as Penteli.

In 1939 she was sold to Brockley Hill Steamship Co Ltd who registered her in London as Brockley Hill. This was a one-ship company set up to own her by Counties Ship Management. Both companies were offshoots of the Rethymnis & Kulukundis shipbroking firm.

== Sinking ==
Brockley Hill left Montreal, Quebec, Canada as a member of Convoy HX 133 on 12 June 1941 with a cargo of grain for London. At 2106 hrs on 24 June German submarine U-651 torpedoed and sank her in the North Atlantic southeast of Cape Farewell in Greenland. Another British cargo steamship in the convoy, James Nourse Ltd's Saugor, rescued all hands and landed them at Loch Ewe in Scotland.

== Replacement ship ==
In 1947 CSM acquired the 7,082-ton Empire Ship SS Empire Asquith and renamed her Brockley Hill. She was sold in 1950 and changed hands again in 1951, being renamed Starcrest. She changed owners and names twice more, was laid up in Turkey in 1962 and scrapped there in 1970.
