= Soviet destroyer Bystry =

Bystry is the name of the following ships in the Soviet Navy:

- Soviet destroyer Bystry (1936), a Gnevny-class destroyer, sank in 1941 during WWII
- Soviet destroyer Bystry (1987), a Sovremenny-class destroyer, decommissioned in 2022

== See also ==
- Bystry
