= HMS Violet (K35) =

British naval corvette during WWII

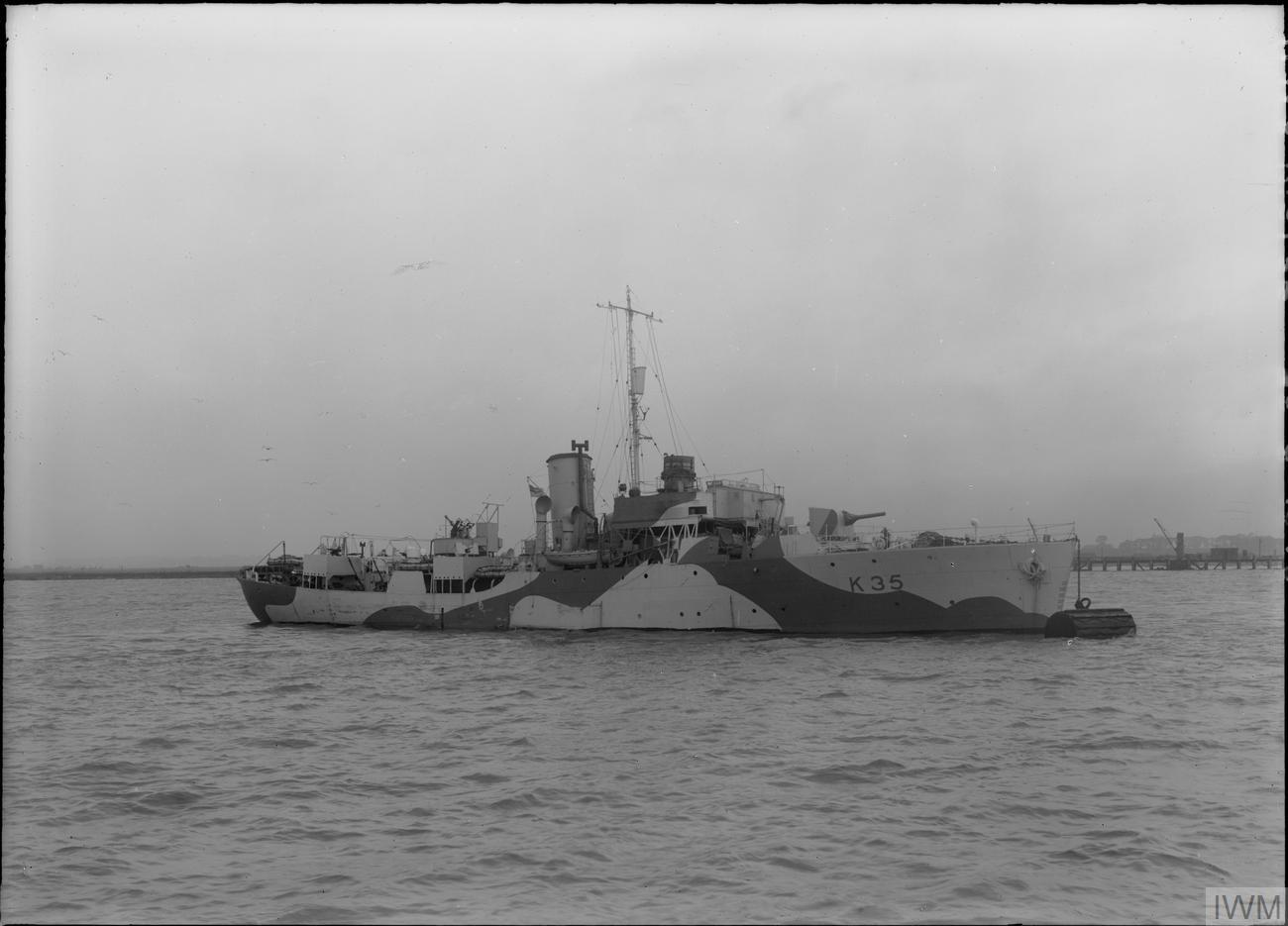
HMS Violet seen at a mooring buoy

HMS Violet (K35) was a Flower-class corvette that served in the Royal Navy during the Second World War. She was named after the Violet flower.

== Construction and career ==
=== Royal Navy ===
Built at Simons & Co in Renfrew on the River Clyde, the ship was laid down on 21 March 1940. The ship was launched on 30 December 1940 and commissioned on 3 February 1941.

Along with HMS Malcolm and others, the ship shared credit for the sinking of the German submarine U-651 on 29 June 1941. The ship then rescued some 16 survivors from the steamship Grayburn which had been sunk earlier by U-651.

In January 1942, the ship was involved in Operation Postmaster. In 1942, the ship was retrofitted, repainted in dazzle camouflage and received an upgrade to her anti-aircraft batteries for a total of six Oerlikon 20 mm cannon on board.

The ship sank U-641 on 19 January 1944.

The ship was paid off on 10 February 1946.

=== Civilian service ===
The ship was sold on 17 May 1947 to Zubi Shipping of London for use as a mercantile ship and renamed La Aguerra. The ship was resold in 1949 to Spain as mercantile La Guera then in 1958 as mercantile Claudio Sabadell. The ship was scrapped in October 1970 at Bilbao.
