= German submarine U-69 (1940) =

German World War II submarine

Coordinates: 50°36′N 41°07′W

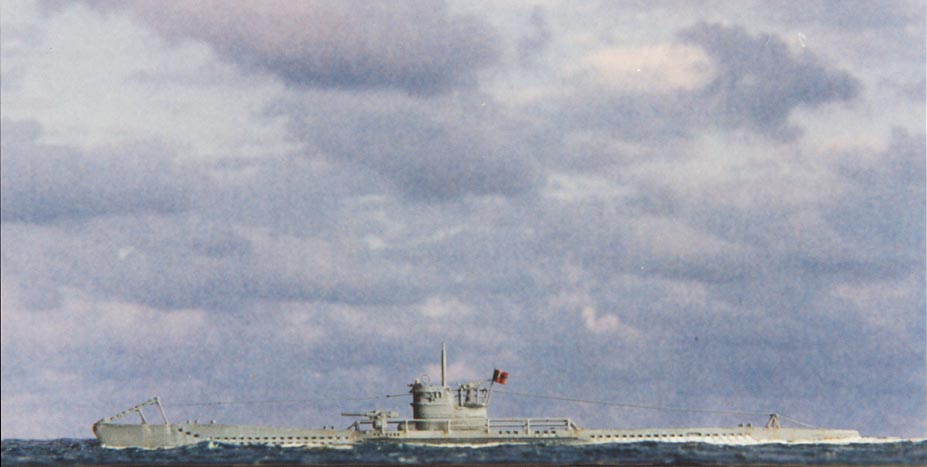
- Type VIIC U-boat

History

Nazi Germany
- Name: U-69
- Ordered: 30 May 1938
- Builder: Germaniawerft, Kiel
- Cost: 4.439.000 Reichsmark
- Yard number: 603
- Laid down: 11 November 1939
- Launched: 19 September 1940
- Commissioned: 2 November 1940
- Fate: Sunk, 17 February 1943

General characteristics
- Class & type: Type VIIC submarine
- Displacement: 769 tonnes (757 long tons) surfaced; 871 t (857 long tons) submerged
- Length: 67.10 m (220 ft 2 in) o/a; 50.50 m (165 ft 8 in) pressure hull
- Beam: 6.20 m (20 ft 4 in) o/a; 4.70 m (15 ft 5 in) pressure hull
- Height: 9.60 m (31 ft 6 in)
- Draught: 4.74 m (15 ft 7 in)
- Installed power: 2,800–3,200 PS (2,100–2,400 kW; 2,800–3,200 bhp) (diesels); 750 PS (550 kW; 740 shp) (electric)
- Propulsion: 2 shafts; 2 × diesel engines; 2 × electric motors
- Speed: 17.7 knots (32.8 km/h; 20.4 mph) surfaced; 7.6 knots (14.1 km/h; 8.7 mph) submerged
- Range: 8,500 nmi (15,700 km; 9,800 mi) at 10 knots (19 km/h; 12 mph) surfaced; 80 nmi (150 km; 92 mi) at 4 knots (7.4 km/h; 4.6 mph) submerged
- Test depth: 230 m (750 ft); Crush depth: 250–295 m (820–968 ft)
- Complement: 4 officers, 40–56 enlisted
- Armament: 5 × 53.3 cm (21 in) torpedo tubes (four bow, one stern); 14 × torpedoes or 26 TMA mines; 1 × 8.8 cm (3.46 in) deck gun (220 rounds); 1 × 2 cm (0.79 in) C/30 anti-aircraft guns

Service record
- Part of: 7th U-boat Flotilla; 2 November 1940 – 17 February 1943
- Identification codes: M 25 172
- Commanders: Kptlt. Jost Metzler; 2 November 1940 – 28 August 1941; Oblt.z.S. Hans-Jürgen Auffermann; 24 – 28 August 1941; Kptlt. Wilhelm Zahn; 28 August 1941 – 31 March 1942; Oblt.z.S. / Kptlt. Ulrich Gräf; 31 March 1942 – 17 February 1943
- Operations: 10 patrols: 1st patrol: 10 February – 1 March 1941; 2nd patrol: 18 March – 11 April 1941; 3rd patrol: 5 May – 8 July 1941; 4th patrol: 21 – 27 August 1941; 5th patrol: 1 September – 1 October 1941; 6th patrol: 30 October – 8 December 1941; 7th patrol: a. 18 – 26 January 1942; b. 31 January – 17 March 1942; 8th patrol: 12 April – 25 June 1942; 9th patrol: 15 August – 5 November 1942; 10th patrol: 2 January – 17 February 1943
- Victories: 17 merchant ships sunk (67,515 GRT); 1 merchant ship total loss (5,445 GRT); 1 merchant ship damaged (4,887 GRT)

German submarine U-69 was the first Type VIIC U-boat of the German Navy (Kriegsmarine) during World War II. This meant that compared to previous U-boats, she could travel further afield for longer, with a payload of fourteen torpedoes, an 8.8 cm (3.5 in) deck gun for smaller vessels and a flak gun for use against aircraft. U-69 was very successful, sinking over 72,000 gross register tons (GRT) of Allied shipping in a career lasting two years, making her one of the longest surviving, continuously serving, U-boats. Her most notable attack was on the civilian ferry SS Caribou, which sank off the coast of Newfoundland five minutes after being torpedoed in October 1942, killing 137 men, women and children. She was rammed and sunk by HMS Fame on 17 February 1943.

== Design and construction ==
German Type VIIC submarines were preceded by the shorter Type VIIB submarines. U-69 had a displacement of 769 tonnes (757 long tons) when at the surface and 871 tonnes (857 long tons) while submerged. She had a total length of 67.10 m (220 ft 2 in), a pressure hull length of 50.50 m (165 ft 8 in), a beam of 6.20 m (20 ft 4 in), a height of 9.60 m (31 ft 6 in), and a draught of 4.74 m (15 ft 7 in). While on the surface the submarine was powered by two Germaniawerft F46 four-stroke, six-cylinder supercharged diesel engines producing a total of 2,800 to 3,200 metric horsepower (2,060 to 2,350 kW; 2,760 to 3,160 shp); while two AEG GU 460/8–27 double-acting electric motors producing a total of 750 metric horsepower (550 kW; 740 shp) were use when the submarine was submerged. She had two shafts and two 1.23 m (4 ft) propellers. The boat was capable of operating at depths of up to 230 metres (750 ft).

The submarine had a maximum surface speed of 17.7 knots (32.8 km/h; 20.4 mph) and a maximum submerged speed of 7.6 knots (14.1 km/h; 8.7 mph). When submerged, the boat could operate for 80 nautical miles (150 km; 92 mi) at 4 knots (7.4 km/h; 4.6 mph); when surfaced, she could travel 8,500 nautical miles (15,700 km; 9,800 mi) at 10 knots (19 km/h; 12 mph). U-69 was fitted with five 53.3 cm (21 in) torpedo tubes (four fitted at the bow and one at the stern), fourteen torpedoes, one 8.8 cm (3.46 in) SK C/35 naval gun, 220 rounds, and one 2 cm (0.79 in) C/30 anti-aircraft gun. The boat had a complement of between forty-four and sixty sailors.

She was built at the Germaniawerft in Kiel during 1940, and was ready for service in November. After her warm up in the Baltic Sea (designed to give her an opportunity to train and repair minor faults), she was deployed into the Atlantic Ocean in February 1941.

== Service history ==
=== First patrol ===
U-69 departed Kiel for her first patrol on 10 February 1941. Her route took her across the North Sea, through the gap between the Faroe and Shetland Islands and into the Atlantic Ocean.

She encountered the MV Siamese Prince southwest of the Faroe Islands on 17 February and sank her. No survivors were picked up, even though the crew were seen to reach the lifeboats.

The boat was attacked twice by a Sunderland flying boat on the 22nd – no damage was sustained.

U-69's next victim was Empire Blanda, sunk on the 19th.

Four days later (on the 23rd), Marslew was similarly destroyed, 200 nautical miles (370 km; 230 mi) north northwest of Rockall. 13 men died, there were 23 survivors.

The submarine was depth charged for three hours by the escorts of convoy OB 288 on 24 February. She escaped without any damage and docked at Lorient on the French Atlantic coast on 1 March.

=== Second patrol ===
The boat's second foray was to the mid-Atlantic. She sank Coultarn southwest of Iceland on 30 March. She then attacked and damaged Thirlby, which had been en route from St. Johns, Newfoundland to Hull. The ship had also probably been hit by a torpedo fired by German submarine U-46. This weapon was a dud. (The ship was further damaged by a bomb from a German aircraft on 10 April).

U-69 returned to Lorient on 11 April.

=== Third patrol ===
The boat's next sortie was to the West African coast. She laid mines off Lagos and Takoradi and made full use of the failure of the allies to enforce convoy systems.

One of her victims was the neutral American ship SS Robin Moor operating 750 miles (1,210 km) off the British port of Freetown, Sierra Leone. The sinking of Robin Moor caused President Roosevelt to brand Germany an "international outlaw" and to require Germany and Italy to close all of their consulates in the United States except for their embassies. Before the sinking, Robin Moor's passengers and crew were allowed thirty minutes to board lifeboats, then the submarine torpedoed, shelled and sank the ship. The survivors then drifted without rescue or detection for up to eighteen days. When news of the sinking reached the US, few shipping companies felt truly safe anywhere. As Time magazine noted in June 1941, "if such sinkings continue, US ships bound for other places remote from fighting fronts, will be in danger. Henceforth the US would either have to recall its ships from the ocean or enforce its right to the free use of the seas." In October 1941, federal prosecutors in the espionage case against a group of 33 defendants known as the "Duquesne Spy Ring" adduced testimony that Leo Waalen had submitted the sailing date of Robin Moor for radio transmission to Germany, five days before the ship began her final voyage. Waalen was found guilty and sentenced to 12 years in prison for espionage and a concurrent 2-year term for violation of the Foreign Agents Registration Act.

U-69 also sank Tewkesbury about 540 nautical miles (1,000 km; 620 mi) south of the Cape Verde Islands on the same date (21 May). Her master was awarded the OBE for his actions, but never knew about it; he was lost when Newbury went to the bottom on 15 September.

She then sank Sangara in Accra harbour on 31 May 1941. The ship went down in 33 ft (10 m) of water, her bow was still visible. (The vessel was salvaged in 1943 and her cargo sold, she was broken up in 1947).

Robert Hughes was lost to a mine laid by U-69 on 4 June.

The submarine sank River Lugar 200 nautical miles (370 km; 230 mi) southeast of the Azores on 27 June 1941 and Empire Ability on that same day.

On the return journey, U-69 was engaged in what was an ultimately successful gun-duel with Robert L. Holt southwest of the Canary Islands on 3 July 1941. She fired 102 high explosive and 34 incendiary rounds from her deck gun, 220 rounds from her 20mm anti-aircraft weapon and 400 rounds from her MG 34 machine gun at the merchantman.

The boat returned to France, to St. Nazaire on 8 July.

Unfortunately, it was nearly a year before they sank another ship, due to the tightening of convoys in the second half of 1941 and some frustratingly short patrols, called off because of mechanical failure or sickness on the boat.

=== Fourth and fifth patrols ===
Patrol number four was relatively short, lasting barely a week and hardly leaving the Bay of Biscay.

U-69's fifth patrol took her northwest of St. Nazaire towards Greenland; although longer, it was also unsuccessful.

=== Sixth and seventh patrols ===
The boat's sixth patrol was uneventful.

During her seventh outing, she was depth charged for several hours by escorts of a convoy on 21 March, west of Ireland. She escaped without any damage.

=== Eighth patrol ===
U-69 added to her tally when she sank the tiny four-masted sailing vessel James E. Newsom off the United States' seaboard with her guns. She sank a further three ships that month, making use of the "Second Happy Time" to add to her score.

On one of them, Lise, the first mate, the Norwegian Hangar Lyngås, survived a total of four torpedoings.

=== Ninth patrol and SS Caribou ===
Easily the most controversial action by U-69 was the destruction of the civilian ferry SS Caribou in the Cabot Strait at 3:21 a.m. Atlantic Summer Time, on 14 October 1942. The submarine had been in the area for a few days, and sank the SS Carolus the day before, with the loss of eleven lives. Early that morning, Caribou was spotted, primarily because her coal-fired steam boilers emitted a long solid black smoke trail, and was silhouetted against the phosphorescent sky. While sitting in wait on the surface, Gräf launched one torpedo, which hit. The stricken vessel's boilers exploded soon after being hit, and the ship sank in approximately five minutes, trapping most of the crew and passengers in the ship.

Caribou departed North Sydney, Nova Scotia, on 13 October 1942, heading for its home port Port aux Basques in Newfoundland. She made this trip three times a week as part of the SPAB convoy series (SPAB for Sydney-Port aux Basques) organized by HMCS Protector. The one-ship coastal convoy was escorted by HMCS Grandmère, a Bangor-class minesweeper.

Controversy surrounded HMCS Grandmère's actions immediately after the sinking in the local Cape Breton Island media. Instead of searching for the survivors right away, she engaged the U-boat in combat, almost ramming her, and firing six depth charges. Grandmère pursued U-69 for close to two hours, then turned back to look for survivors. During this time, some survivors of the sinking died from exposure in the cold Atlantic. As noted in a dispatch a few weeks later by the Flag Officer of the Newfoundland Force, Commodore H. E. Reid, Grandmère was following normal operational doctrine by going after the submarine, and not stopping to pick up survivors. If she had stopped, she would likely have been sunk as well by U-69.

In all 57 military personnel, 31 merchant seamen and 49 civilians — including many women and children — were killed in the sinking, totalling 137 persons lost (most were trapped in the ship, and drowned). The sinking was also one of the few times that military censorship was immediately lifted, in an attempt to prevent rumours and speculation. The sinking made news across North America that week and was used effectively as a rallying cry for Victory Bond campaigns. The sinking was possibly the most significant in Canadian and Newfoundland waters, not because of Caribou's tactical importance; but rather, the U-boat war was on display to Canadians and Newfoundlanders on their home front.

=== Tenth patrol and loss ===
On 17 February 1943, while operating with wolf-pack Haudegen, U-69 was involved in an attack on convoy ONS 165 in the middle of the North Atlantic. Located by HF/DF and radar, she was forced to the surface by depth charges and then rammed by the destroyer HMS Fame. None of her 46 crew survived the sinking.

== Emblem ==
U-69 was unusual in that she had two ships' emblems. The first, adopted on commissioning, was chosen by her first commander, Metzler. This consisted of the word Horrido (Tally-Ho) and the three two-flag signal groups for the letters L M A (German: leck mich am Arsch, lit. 'lick my arse', a reference to Götz von Berlichingen’s famous retort. The second came about when the 7th flotilla adopted Prien's bull emblem as its flotilla insignia. U-69's new first officer, who had not seen the insignia before, found a picture of a cow on a French cheese box, and had that painted on the conning tower, complete with the motto on the box "la vache qui rit" (the laughing cow). When Metzler saw it, he decided to keep it, as it raised a laugh with all who saw it, and the crew adopted the slogan as a war-cry; U-69 thereafter became known as the "laughing cow".

=== Wolfpacks ===
U-69 took part in seven wolfpacks, namely:

- Seewolf (4 – 15 September 1941)
- Brandenburg (15 – 24 September 1941)
- Störtebecker (5 – 19 November 1941)
- Gödecke (19 – 25 November 1941)
- Letzte Ritter (25 November – 3 December 1941)
- Falke (8 – 19 January 1943)
- Haudegen (19 January – 15 February 1943)

== Summary of raiding history ==
Date	Ship	Nationality	Tonnage	Fate
17 February 1941	Siamese Prince	United Kingdom	8,456	Sunk
19 February 1941	Empire Blanda	United Kingdom	5,693	Sunk
23 February 1941	Marslew	United Kingdom	4,542	Sunk
30 March 1941	Coultarn	United Kingdom	3,759	Sunk
3 April 1941	Thirlby	United Kingdom	4,887	Damaged
21 May 1941	Robin Moor	United States	4,999	Sunk
21 May 1941	Tewkesbury	United Kingdom	4,601	Sunk
31 May 1941	Sangara	United Kingdom	5,445	Total loss
3 June 1941	Robert Hughes	United Kingdom	2,879	Sunk (mine)
27 June 1941	Empire Ability	United Kingdom	7,603	Sunk
27 June 1941	River Lugar	United Kingdom	5,423	Sunk
3 July 1941	Robert L. Holt	United Kingdom	2,918	Sunk
1 May 1942	James E Newsom	Canada	671	Sunk
12 May 1942	Lise	Norway	6,826	Sunk
13 May 1942	Norlantic	United States	2,606	Sunk
21 May 1942	Torondoc	Canada	1,927	Sunk
5 June 1942	Letitia Porter	Netherlands	15	Sunk
9 October 1942	Carolus	Canada	2,375	Sunk
14 October 1942	Caribou	Newfoundland	2,222	Sunk

== Bibliography ==
- Busch, Rainer; Röll, Hans-Joachim (1999). German U-boat commanders of World War II : a biographical dictionary. Translated by Brooks, Geoffrey. London, Annapolis, Md: Greenhill Books, Naval Institute Press. ISBN 1-55750-186-6.
- Busch, Rainer; Röll, Hans-Joachim (1999). Deutsche U-Boot-Verluste von September 1939 bis Mai 1945 [German U-boat losses from September 1939 to May 1945]. Der U-Boot-Krieg (in German). Vol. IV. Hamburg, Berlin, Bonn: Mittler. ISBN 3-8132-0514-2.
- Edwards, Bernard (1996). Dönitz and the Wolf Packs - The U-boats at War. Cassell Military Classics. p. 152. ISBN 0-304-35203-9.
- Gröner, Erich; Jung, Dieter; Maass, Martin (1991). German Warships 1815–1945, U-boats and Mine Warfare Vessels. Vol. 2. Translated by Thomas, Keith; Magowan, Rachel. London: Conway Maritime Press. ISBN 0-85177-593-4.
- Caplan, Ronald (1 August 1987). "Caribou and Grandmere". Cape Breton's Magazine (46). Wreck Cove, Cape Breton, Nova Scotia: Breton Books: 37–41. ISSN 0319-4639. Archived from the original on 22 September 2014.
- Greenfield, Nathan M. (2004). The Battle of the St. Lawrence. Canada: Harper Perennial. ISBN 0-00-639450-7.
- How, Douglas (1988). Night of the Caribou. Hantsport, Nova Scotia: Lancelot Press. ISBN 978-0-88999-410-2.
- Metzler, Jost (2002). The Laughing Cow. Cerberus Publishing. ISBN 1-84145-022-7.
- Sharpe, Peter (1998). U-Boat Fact File. Great Britain: Midland Publishing. ISBN 1-85780-072-9.
- Tennyson, Brian Douglas; Sarty, Roger F. (2000). Guardian of the Gulf: Sydney, Cape Breton, and the Atlantic wars. Toronto: University of Toronto Press. ISBN 978-0-8020-4492-1. "Guardian of the Gulf : Sydney, Cape Breton, and the Atlantic wars."
