= HMS Arabis (K73) =

Flower-class corvette

History

United Kingdom
- Name: Arabis
- Namesake: Arabis
- Ordered: 19 September 1939
- Builder: Harland & Wolff, Belfast
- Yard number: 1058
- Laid down: 30 October 1939
- Launched: 14 February 1940
- Completed: 5 April 1940
- Commissioned: 5 April 1940
- Out of service: 30 April 1942
- Identification: Pennant number: K73

United States
- Name: Saucy
- Commissioned: 30 April 1942
- Decommissioned: 20 August 1945
- Out of service: 26 August 1945
- Stricken: 19 September 1945
- Identification: Hull number: PG-65

United Kingdom
- Name: Snapdragon
- Namesake: Snapdragon
- Identification: Pennant number: K73
- Fate: Sold into merchant service in 1946. (Note: Dictionary of American Naval Fighting Ships and NavSource Online gives 1947 as the year the ship was sold into merchant service. Colledge and Uboat.net give it as 1946.) Renamed SS Katina in 1947. Renamed SS Tewfik in 1950

General characteristics
- Class & type: Flower-class corvette
- Displacement: 925 long tons (940 t)
- Length: 205 ft (62 m)
- Beam: 33 ft (10 m)
- Draught: 11 ft 6 in (3.51 m)
- Propulsion: Two fire tube boilers; One 4-cycle triple-expansion steam engine, generating 2,750 hp (2,050 kW)
- Speed: 16 kn (30 km/h)
- Range: 3,500 nmi (6,500 km) at 12 kn (22 km/h)
- Complement: 85
- Armament: 1 × BL 4 in (102 mm) Mk IX gun, 1 × 3"/50 dual purpose gun mount; 2 × 20 mm twin machine guns, 2 × stern depth charge racks with 40 depth charges

HMS Arabis was a Flower-class corvette of the Royal Navy. The ship was commissioned into the Royal Navy as HMS Arabis. She was transferred to the United States Navy in 1942, serving as USS Saucy. Returned to the United Kingdom in 1945, she was recommissioned into the Royal Navy as HMS Snapdragon.

== World War II service ==
Arabis was built at Harland & Wolff, Belfast, as part of the 1939 War Emergency Programme for the Royal Navy. One of the early Flower-class corvettes, she was ordered on 19 September 1939, and laid down a month later. She was launched on 14 February 1940 and completed on 5 April 1940. She was named after the flowering plant arabis, sometimes known as rockcress.

=== Royal Navy ===
After working up, Arabis was assigned to the Western Approaches Escort Force for service as a convoy escort. In this role Arabis was engaged in all the duties performed by escort ships; protecting convoys, searching for and attacking U-boats which attacked ships in convoy, and rescuing survivors. During this period she fought in several convoy battles. In September 1940 Arabis was part of the force escorting convoy OB 216, which lost four ships and in October with OB 229 which lost two. The same month she was with the ill-fated HX 79 which lost twelve ships in a matter of hours. In May 1941 Arabis was part of the force escorting HX 126, which lost seven ships sunk, and in June with HX 133 which saw six ships sunk and one U-boat destroyed.

During her two years service in the Battle of the Atlantic Arabis escorted 47 Atlantic and 11 Gibraltar convoys, assisting in the safe passage of over 2,000 ships, though some were subsequently lost.

=== US Navy ===
Whilst at Belfast in April 1942, she was transferred to the United States Navy under Reverse Lend Lease, one of ten Flower-class corvettes to be so transferred during 1942. After escorting a convoy to Halifax, Nova Scotia, she sailed to Boston for refitting. Following this she escorted ships between Trinidad and Barbados. In September she was transferred to the Trinidad-Guantanamo Bay convoy route and in January 1943 was changed again, to the Trinidad-Recife, route. She returned to North Atlantic convoy duties in March 1944 and was decommissioned from the United States Navy at Chatham, England in August 1945.

== Post-war service ==
Recommissioned into the Royal Navy as HMS Snapdragon, she was sold in 1946.

== Mercantile service ==
She worked as the merchant vessel SS Katina and in 1950 was renamed SS Tewfik.

== Sources ==
=== Websites ===
- "Saucy". Dictionary of American Naval Fighting Ships. Navy Department, Naval History and Heritage Command..
- "HMS Snapdragon – ex-USS Saucy (PG 65)". NavSource.
- Helgason, Guðmundur. "HMS Arabis (K 73)". Corvette of the Flower class. Uboat.net.
- Helgason, Guðmundur. "USS Saucy (PG-65)". Corvette of the Flower class. Uboat.net.

=== Books ===
- Blair, Clay (1996). Hitler's U-Boat War: The Hunters 1939-1942. Cassell. ISBN 0-304-35260-8.
- Colledge, J. J.; Warlow, Ben (2006) [1969]. Ships of the Royal Navy: The Complete Record of All Fighting Ships of the Royal Navy from the 15th Century to the Present (3rd Rev ed.). London: Chatham Publishing. ISBN 978-1-86176-281-8. OCLC 67375475.
- Chesneau, Roger, ed. (1980). Conway's All the World's Fighting Ships 1922–1946. Greenwich, UK: Conway Maritime Press. ISBN 0-85177-146-7.
- Elliott, Peter (1977). Allied Escort Ships of World War II: A complete survey. London: Macdonald and Jane's. ISBN 0-356-08401-9.
- Hague, Arnold : The Allied Convoy System 1939–1945 (2000) ISBN 1-55125-033-0 (Canada). ISBN 1-86176-147-3 (UK)
