= Convoy HG 70 =

Convoy HG 73
- Part of World War II
| Date | 10 August 1941 – 15 August 1941 |
| Location | North Atlantic |

Belligerents
| Kriegsmarine Regia Marina | United Kingdom |

Commanders and leaders
| Admiral Karl Dönitz | Comm: R Adm. EW Leir; SOE: unknown |

Strength
| 8 U-boats; 1 Italian submarines | 25 merchant ships 22 escorts (in rotation) |

Casualties and losses
| 4 U-boats damaged, forced to return to base | 2 ships sunk |

HG 70 was an Allied convoy of the HG (Homeward from Gibraltar) series during World War II. It was attacked by a pack of ten U-boats, without success. All U-boats were beaten off, and they sank no ships of the convoy. Two ships were lost to aircraft; 23 ships arrived safely.

== Forces involved ==
HG 70 comprised 25 ships homeward bound from Gibraltar, many in ballast, or carrying trade goods. The convoy commodore was R Adm. EW Leir, in the freighter Polo, and the convoy was protected by a Western Approaches Command escort group, consisting of five corvettes. The convoy escort was augmented during the first few days by the destroyer Avon Vale and the submarine Clyde, and two ASW trawlers. They were joined during the first part of the voyage by the destroyers Boreas and Eridge, and a second escort group from OG 70, comprising the sloop HMS Deptford, destroyers Nestor and Encounter, and the corvette Convolvulus; they were also reinforced at various times throughout the voyage as warships came and went.

Ranged against them was an ad hoc (and unnamed) wolfpack of five U-boats, reinforced with a group of four U-boats returning from a cancelled mission to the South Atlantic, all captained by experienced skippers and all holders of the Knight's Cross.

== Action ==
HG 70 sailed from Gibraltar on 9 August 1941, and was reported almost immediately by German agents across the bay in neutral Spain; these were able to report the convoy's composition, escort strength and departure time. In response U boat Command (BdU) ordered five boats from a northerly patrol line (Group South) to intercept, and diverted four boats returning from a cancelled mission to the South Atlantic, at that time off the Canaries. He also summoned aircraft from KG 40, a unit of Fw 200 "Condors" based at Bordeaux, to patrol and report on the convoys progress.

On 10 August the convoy was sighted by U-79, from Group South, which commenced shadowing, but she was attacked by escorting ships and aircraft. She was driven under and lost contact.

On 11 August the convoy was found again, this time by U-93 from the Canaries group; she was found by an escorting aircraft, bombed and damaged so severely that she had to break off and return to base for repairs. The report from U-93 enabled U-79 to regain contact, and for U-94 from the Canaries group to join; Both were depth-charged heavily by escorts, but remained in contact. A third U-boat, U-331 from South group, also joined, but was also detected and driven off by the escorts, and had to break off due to damage. Also that day HG 70 was attacked by aircraft; two ships, Empire Hurst and Sud, were hit and reported sunk, though other sources say Sud was still afloat on 14 August when she was found and sunk by Italian submarine Marconi and by U-126, en route to join the attack on HG 70.

On 12 August the convoy was sighted by a patrolling Condor, and another Freetown boat, U-123, joined the pursuit. She too was detected and counter-attacked; Her crew counted 126 depth-charges dropped on them, 36 of them close enough to damage the boat so severely that she too had to return to base for repairs.

Later HG 70 was found by U-109 and U-124, both returning from Freetown. Both U-boats were attacked before they could obtain a firing position. U-109 was driven off, and returned to base with damage; U-124 found it impossible to approach and also broke off the attack.

On 15 August BdU cancelled the operation against HG 70 and the convoy continued on without further incident, arriving at Liverpool on 23 August.

== Aftermath ==
The attack on HG 70 was, for the Germans, a disastrous failure. Ten U-boats had been involved in the operation; none had been able to get close enough to fire on the merchant ships, and four had been so severely handled that h they had been obliged to return to base for repairs. Using radio-detection (HF/DF) to locate the U-boats as they broadcast their sighting reports, and by vigorously attacking any contact to drive them under and thus unable to keep up, the escorts kept the merchant ships in the convoy safe from attack.

The failure prompted BdU to consider loss of morale as a factor, and on their return three of the four older commanders (from the Freetown operation) were moved to shore posts.

== Ships involved ==
=== Merchant ships ===
| Ships | Flag | Tonnage (GRT) | Notes |
|---|---|---|---|
| Alhama | UK | 1352 | |
| Baltallinn | UK | 1303 | |
| Baron Kelvin | UK | 3081 | |
| Briarwood | UK | 4019 | |
| British Coast | UK | 889 | |
| Cara | UK | 1760 | |
| City of Waterford | UK | 1017 | |
| Csarda | Panama | 3882 | |
| Dux | Norwegian | 1590 | |
| Empire Bay | UK | 2824 | |
| Empire Brook | UK | 2852 | |
| Empire Hurst | UK | 2852 | sunk by aircraft 11 Aug |
| Empire Kestrel | UK | 2674 | Rear Comm. |
| Empire Snipe | UK | 2497 | |
| Empire Tern | UK | 2479 | |
| Flaminian | UK | 2711 | |
| Gothland | UK | 1286 | |
| Inger Lise | Nor | 1582 | |
| Lissa | UK | 1511 | |
| Menapia | UK | 902 | |
| Philipp M | UK | 2085 | |
| Polo | UK | 1950 | Comm. R.Adm EW Leir DSO |
| Sud | Yug | 2589 | hit by aircraft 11 Aug |
| Wallsend | UK | 3157 | Vice Comm. |

=== Escorts ===
| Ship | Type | Joined | Left | Notes |
|---|---|---|---|---|
| HMS Avon Vale (L06) | Hunt-class destroyer | 9 Aug | 14 Aug | |
| HMS Begonia (K66) | Flower-class corvette | 9 Aug | 23 Aug | |
| HMS Black Swan (L57) | Black Swan-class sloop | 15 Aug | 21 Aug | from convoy OG 70 |
| HMS Boreas (H77) | B-class destroyer | 11 Aug | 13 Aug | |
| HMS Campbeltown (I42) | Town-class destroyer | 19 Aug | ? | from convoy OS 3 |
| HMS Clyde (N12) | River-class submarine | 9 Aug | 11 Aug | |
| HMS Convolvulus (K45) | Flower-class corvette | 11 Aug | before 18 Aug | from convoy OG 70, to HG 71 |
| Copeland | Convoy rescue ship | 9 Aug | 23 Aug | 1526 tons |
| HMS Cossack (F03) | Tribal-class destroyer | 14 Aug | ? | |
| HMS Deptford (U53) | Grimsby-class sloop | 11 Aug | ? | from OG 70 |
| HMS Duncan (D99) | D-class destroyer leader | 15 Aug | 19 Aug | |
| HMS Encounter (H10) | E-class destroyer | 11 Aug | ? | from OG 70 |
| HMS Eridge (L68) | Hunt-class destroyer | 9 Aug | 14 Aug | |
| HMS Faulknor (H62) | F-class destroyer | 10 Aug | ? | (returning to UK for repair) |
| HMS Jasmine (K23) | Flower-class corvette | 9 Aug | 23 Aug | |
| HMS Lady Hogarth | ASW Trawler | 9 Aug | ? | |
| HMS Lady Shirley | ASW Trawler | 9 Aug | ? | |
| HMS Larkspur (K82) | Flower-class corvette | 9 Aug | 23 Aug | |
| HMAS Nestor (G02) | N-class destroyer | 11 Aug | 13 Aug | from OG 70; d/c damage 13 Aug |
| HMS Pimpernel (K71) | Flower-class corvette | 9 Aug | 23 Aug | |
| HMS Rhodedendron (K78) | Flower-class corvette | 9 Aug | ? | |
| HMS Stork (L81) | Bittern class sloop | 13 Aug | ? | from OG 71 |
| HMS Wild Swan (D62) | Modified W-class destroyer | 11 Aug | 15 Aug | |

=== German U-boats ===
| U-boat | Type | First contact | Notes |
|---|---|---|---|
| U-79 | Type VIIC | 10 Aug | |
| U-93 | Type VIIC | 11 Aug | |
| U-94 | Type VIIC | 11 Aug | |
| U-109 | Type IXB | 13 Aug | |
| U-123 | Type IXB | 12 Aug | |
| U-124 | Type IXB | ? 13 Aug | |
| U-126 | Type IXC | not found | sank straggler Sud on 14 Aug |
| U-331 | Type VIIC | 11 Aug | |

=== Italian submarines ===
| Name | Class | First contact | Notes |
|---|---|---|---|
| Guglielmo Marconi | Marconi-class | not found | attacked straggler Sud on 14 Aug and left sinking; claimed by U-126. |
