= Action in Tarrafal Bay =

WWII Atlantic naval engagement involving four submarines

- Part of World War II
Date	27/28 September 1941
Location	Tarrafal Bay, Santo Antão, Cape Verde, Atlantic Ocean
Result	Inconclusive

Belligerents
United Kingdom	(Nazi Germany) Germany

Commanders and leaders
(United Kingdom) LtCdr. DC. Ingram	(Nazi Germany) V Adm. Karl Dönitz (BdU)

Strength
1 submarine	3 U-boats

Casualties and losses
1 submarine slightly damaged, none killed	1 U-boat damaged none killed

The Action in Tarrafal Bay (or Tarafal Bay) was a naval engagement which took place during the Battle of the Atlantic in the Second World War. It was notable in that the four vessels involved were all submarines. The Naval Intelligence Division had solved a message intercepted from U-boat U-111 that was returning to France, concerning a rendezvous with U-67 and U-68 in the Bay of Tarrafal on the island of Santo Antão. The Admiralty dispatched HMS Clyde to destroy the German U-boats.

== Background ==
In September 1941 the German U-boat Arm was engaged in a war against Allied trade; as part of this offensive the U-boat Command (BdU) in the person of V Adm. Karl Dönitz dispatched a force of U-boats to operate in the South Atlantic, principally off the west African coast. The first wave of four boats left in late August and early September. They had little success; one factor in this was that the Allies had penetrated the German Enigma code system, and were able to garner up-to-date intelligence (Ultra) on the whereabouts of marauding U-boats. This enabled them to re-route merchant shipping to avoid trouble.

The following wave, also of four U-boats, departed in mid-September; these were more successful, mounting an attack on convoy SL 87, sinking six ships. In the process of attacking SL 87 one boat, U-68 (KK K-F Merten), fired most of her torpedoes, many of which had malfunctioned (a late example of the torpedo problems that bedeviled the U-boat Arm in the early part of the war) and was left without enough to continue. Another U-boat, U-67 (KL G. Müller-Stöckheim), had a crewman requiring medical attention. BdU decided to have U-67 and U-68 rendezvous with U-111 (KL W. Kleinschmidt), a first wave boat which was returning to base. Thus, U-111 would transfer fuel and torpedoes to U-68, while the doctor aboard U-68 could treat the sick man on U-67. If he needed hospitalization he could then be shipped home in U-111.

The RV was set for Tarrafal Bay, on the island of Santo Antão in the Cape Verde island group. Cape Verde was neutral Portuguese territory and Tarrafal Bay was a remote region of it; BdU reasoned it would be an eminently suitable site for the meeting.

The arrangement for the RV were transmitted encrypted by radio; the messages were received and decoded at Bletchley Park, including an indiscrete reference by the captain of U-111 to Tarrafal Bay as the rendezvous site. Despite the risk of acting directly on Ultra intelligence, thereby risking exposing the fact that the code had been penetrated, the Admiralty decided to intercept the RV and ordered the submarine HMS Clyde (LtCdr. DC. Ingram), on ASW duty in the South Atlantic, to intercept and destroy them.

== Action ==
On the evening of 27 September U-68 and U-111 made rendezvous in Tarrafal bay. After transferring torpedoes, and making social exchanges, both Merten and Kleinschmidt chose to stand out to sea, in order to gain sea-room, while awaiting U-67. At midnight both U-68 and U-111 were heading out of the bay on the surface, when Clyde, also on the surface, arrived at the mouth of the bay. Catching sight of U-68, Ingram quickly set up a torpedo attack, but before he could fire, his lookouts spotted U-111 heading towards him on a collision course. At the same moment U-111's bridge crew spotted Clyde, but as Clyde turned to face the oncoming boat, Kleinschmidt elected to crash-dive rather than risk ramming the larger British vessel. His boat submerged, passing a few feet below Clyde's keel. Ingram quickly turned back to his attack on U-68, firing a full salvo of six torpedoes. However Merten had seen the commotion and the torpedo tracks, and turned to comb them before crash-diving himself. The torpedoes shot past harmlessly, two exploding on the shore, and Clyde also dived to re-load. At this point Tarrafal bay had three submarines all submerged and searching for each other by hydrophone.

Into this scene Müller-Stöckheim in U-67 arrived, expecting to find his two comrades. He was alerted by the explosions ashore, and he too dived to start a hydrophone search. Shortly, he heard propellers approaching, but could see nothing; and decided to surface and make for open water. While doing so he encountered Clyde, heading out of the bay. Having re-loaded, Ingram had decided to regain sea-room and was now on a collision course for U-67. Judging it was too close for a torpedo attack, Ingram determined to ram her, while Müller-Stöckheim, deciding against a crash-dive, backed engines to avoid the oncoming submarine. He escaped his boat being sliced in two, but U-67's bow struck a glancing blow against Clyde's stern. Clyde escaped serious damage, but U-67's prow was bent almost to right angles to the hull. At this both vessels submerged and lost each other in the open water.

== Aftermath ==
Clyde was not seriously damaged and was able to resume her patrol, but was unable to regain contact with any of the U-boats. U-67 was unable to continue; her torpedo tubes were inoperable and she was ordered to return, still carrying the sick crew-member whose plight had sparked the incident. U-68 was unaffected, and was ordered to continue her patrol. BdU arranged a further rendezvous with U-67 to take on more fuel and torpedoes; this took place without incident on in a remote bay on the coast of Africa. U-111 set out for home, but on 4 October was sunk in an action with the armed trawler, HMS Lady Shirley.

The arrival of Clyde in Tarrafal bay on the same evening that U-boats were due to rendezvous was immediately seen as too unlikely to be a coincidence; BdU ordered a full investigation of security, including a check to see whether Enigma had been breached. This was carried out by VAdm. E. Maertens, the Kriegsmarine's chief of communications; his report, on 24 October concluded that Enigma was safe, reinforcing the general view that penetration of Enigma was impossible. Despite this, BdU had ordered temporary measures on 1 October, leading to an Enigma "blackout" at Bletchley Park. This lasted seven days, when Allied code-breakers re-gained access.

The action had jeopardized Britain's fragile advantage in the intelligence war, and was saved only by the German navy's complacency concerning its Enigma code. Maertens report, which ran to 18 pages, dismissed the idea of a breach, attributing the discovery to radio direction finding, or to reports from neutral vessels.

However both the suspicion and the investigation of the security breach were overtaken in late October, when the U-boat Arm implemented some long-planned changes to the Enigma system (the change to the Triton network, and the four-rotor machine) which resulted in a prolonged blackout well into the following year.
