= Wolfpack West =

- Active: 8 May - 20 June 1941
- Country: Nazi Germany
- Branch: Kriegsmarine
- Size: 23 submarines
- Engagements: Convoy OB 317; Convoy OB 318; Convoy OB 322; Convoy OB 327; Convoy OB 328; Convoy OB 329; Convoy OB 330; Convoy SC 30; Convoy HX 126; Convoy HX 128

Commanders
- Notable commanders: Gerhard Bigalk; Engelbert Endrass; Robert Gysae; Eitel-Friedrich Kentrat; Wilhelm Kleinschmidt; Claus Korth; Herbert Kuppisch; Fritz-Julius Lemp; Wolfgang Lüth; Ernst Mengersen; Adalbert Schnee; Klaus Scholtz; Heinrich Schonder; Herbert Schultze; Robert Gysae; Karl Thurmann; Helmut Rosenbaum; Herbert Wohlfarth; Robert-Richard Zapp

West was a wolfpack of German U-boats that operated during the World War II Battle of the Atlantic from 8 May 1941 to 20 June 1941.

This wolfpack was responsible for sinking 33 ships (191,414 gross register tons (GRT)) and damaging a further four ships (33,448 GRT), making it one of the most successful wolfpacks of World War II.

== Raiding Summary ==
Date	U-boat	Name of ship	Nationality	Tons	Convoy	Comments
8 May 1941	U-97	Ramillies	United Kingdom	4,553	OB 317	Sunk
9 May 1941	U-110	Bengore Head	United Kingdom	2,609	OB 318	Sunk
9 May 1941	U-201	Empire Cloud	United Kingdom	5,969	OB 318	Damaged
9 May 1941	U-110	Esmond	United Kingdom	4,976	OB 318	Sunk
9 May 1941	U-201	Gregalia	United Kingdom	5,802	OB 318	Sunk
10 May 1941	U-556	Aelybryn	United Kingdom	4,986	OB 318	Damaged
10 May 1941	U-556	Empire Caribou	United Kingdom	4,861	OB 318	Sunk
10 May 1941	U-556	Gand	Belgium	5,086	OB 318	Sunk
13 May 1941	U-98	HMS Salopian	Royal Navy	10,549	SC 30	Sunk
13 May 1941	U-111	Somersby	United Kingdom	5,170	SC 30	Sunk
20 May 1941	U-556	British Security	United Kingdom	8,470	HX 126	Sunk
20 May 1941	U-556	Cockaponset	United Kingdom	5,995	HX 126	Sunk
20 May 1941	U-556	Darlington Court	United Kingdom	4,974	HX 126	Sunk
20 May 1941	U-109	Harpagus	United Kingdom	5,173	HX 126	Sunk
20 May 1941	U-94	John P. Pedersen	Norway	6,128	HX 126	Sunk
20 May 1941	U-94	Norman Monarch	United Kingdom	4,718	HX 126	Sunk
20 May 1941	U-98	Rothermere	United Kingdom	5,356	HX 126	Sunk
20 May 1941	U-111	San Felix	United Kingdom	13,037	OB 322	Damaged
21 May 1941	U-93	Elusa	Netherlands	6,235	HX 126	Sunk
21 May 1941	U-98	Marconi	United Kingdom	7,402	OB 322	Sunk
22 May 1941	U-111	Barnby	United Kingdom	4,813	HX 126	Sunk
29 May 1941	U-557	Empire Storm	United Kingdom	7,290	HX 128	Sunk
2 June 1941	U-108	Michael E.	United Kingdom	7,628	OB 327	Sunk
3 June 1941	U-75	Eibergen	Netherlands	4,801	OB 327	Sunk
3 June 1941	U-48	Inversuir	United Kingdom	9,456	OB 327	Damaged
3 June 1941	U-75	Inversuir	United Kingdom	9,456	OB 327	Sunk
4 June 1941	U-101	Trecarrell	United Kingdom	5,271	OB 327	Sunk
5 June 1941	U-48	Wellfield	United Kingdom	6,054	OB 328	Sunk
6 June 1941	U-48	Tregarthen	United Kingdom	5,201	OB 329	Sunk
6 June 1941	U-43	Yselhaven	Netherlands	4,802	OB 328	Sunk
8 June 1941	U-108	Baron Nairn	United Kingdom	3,164	OB 328	Sunk
8 June 1941	U-108	Dirphys	Greece	4,240		Sunk
8 June 1941	U-48	Pendrecht	Netherlands	10,746	OB 329	Sunk
9 June 1941	U-101	Trevarrack	United Kingdom	5,270	OB 329	Sunk
10 June 1941	U-108	Christian Krohg	Norway	1,992	OB 329	Sunk
10 June 1941	U-204	Mercier	Belgium	7,886	OB 330	Sunk
13 June 1941	U-77	Tresillian	United Kingdom	4,743	OB 330	Sunk

== U-Boats ==
Of the 23 U-boat commanders, 19 were either, or went on to become, recipients of the Knight’s Cross of the Iron Cross.

U-boat	Commander	From	To	Notes
U-43	Wolfgang Lüth	17 May 1941	16 June 1941	
U-46	Engelbert Endrass	19 May 1941	6 June 1941	
U-48	Herbert Schultze	2 June 1941	8 June 1941	
U-66	Robert-Richard Zapp	24 May 1941	5 June 1941	
U-73	Helmut Rosenbaum	31 May 1941	16 June 1941	
U-74	Eitel-Friedrich Kentrat	13 May 1941	22 May 1941	
U-75	Helmuth Ringelmann	2 June 1941	20 June 1941	
U-77	Heinrich Schonder	6 June 1941	20 June 1941	
U-93	Claus Korth	8 May 1941	26 May 1941	
U-94	Herbert Kuppisch	8 May 1941	29 May 1941	
U-97	Udo Heilmann	8 May 1941	27 May 1941	
U-98	Robert Gysae	8 May 1941	27 May 1941	
U-101	Ernst Mengersen	2 June 1941	20 June 1941	
U-108	Klaus Scholtz	2 June 1941	20 June 1941	
U-109	Hans-Georg Fischer	13 May 1941	23 May 1941	
U-110	Fritz-Julius Lemp	9 May 1941	9 May 1941	U-boat was lost
U-111	Wilhelm Kleinschmidt	13 May 1941	5 June 1941	
U-201	Adalbert Schnee	8 May 1941	13 May 1941	
U-204	Walter Kell	5 June 1941	16 June 1941	
U-553	Karl Thurmann	13 June 1941	20 June 1941	
U-556	Herbert Wohlfarth	10 May 1941	20 May 1941	
U-557	Ottokar Arnold Paulssen	25 May 1941	20 June 1941	
U-751	Gerhard Bigalk	16 June 1941	20 June 1941	
