= German submarine U-111 (1940) =

German World War II submarine

Coordinates: 27°10′N 20°24′W

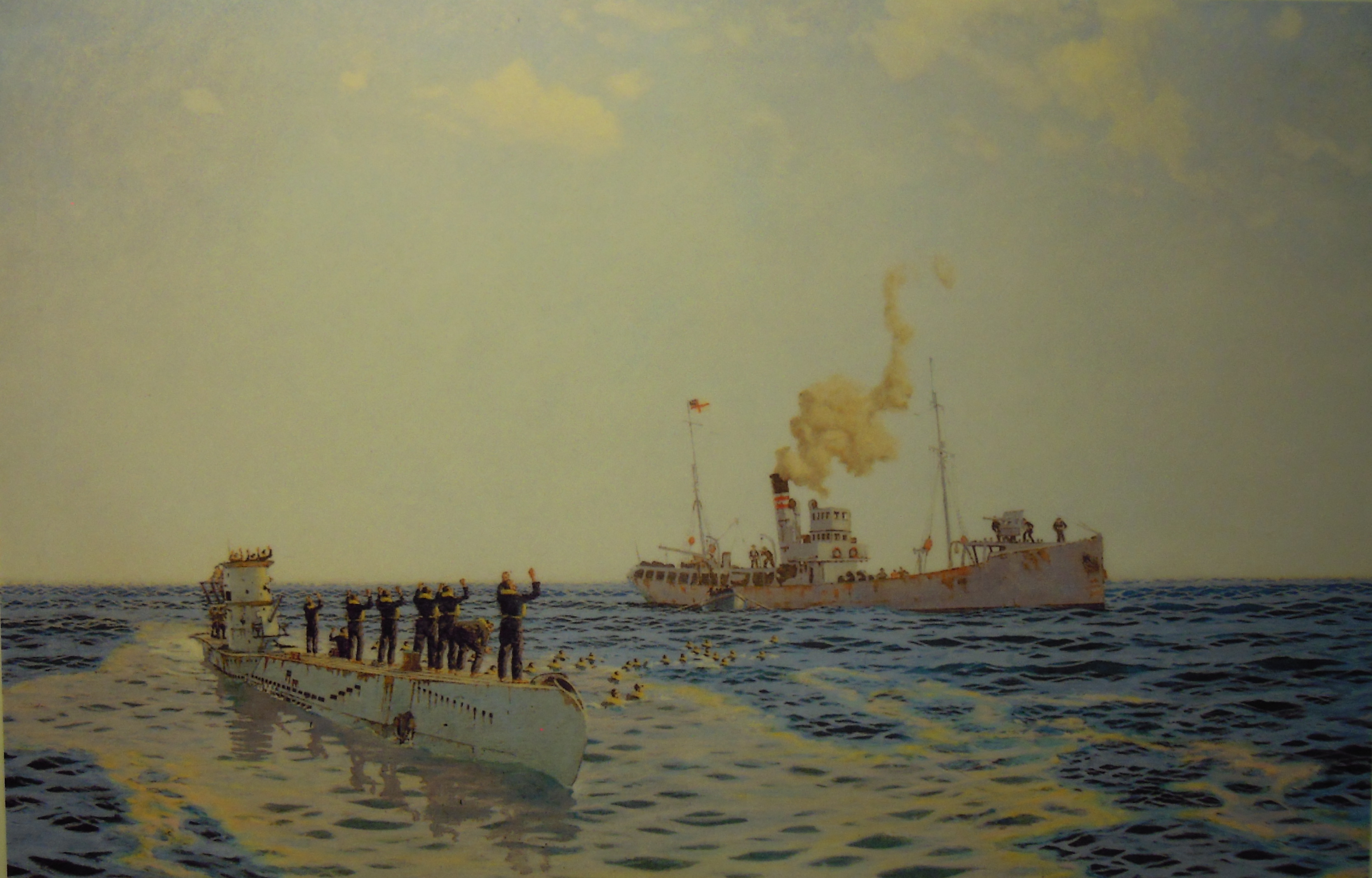
- Surrender of U-111, by Charles Pears

History

Nazi Germany
- Name: U-111
- Ordered: 8 August 1939
- Builder: DeSchiMAG AG Weser, Bremen
- Yard number: 976
- Laid down: 20 February 1940
- Launched: 15 September 1940
- Commissioned: 19 December 1940
- Fate: Sunk 4 October 1941

General characteristics
- Class & type: Type IXB submarine
- Displacement: 1,051 t (1,034 long tons) surfaced; 1,178 t (1,159 long tons) submerged
- Length: 76.50 m (251 ft) o/a; 58.75 m (192 ft 9 in) pressure hull
- Beam: 6.76 m (22 ft 2 in) o/a; 4.40 m (14 ft 5 in) pressure hull
- Draught: 4.70 m (15 ft 5 in)
- Installed power: 4,400 PS (3,200 kW; 4,300 bhp) (diesels); 1,000 PS (740 kW; 990 shp) (electric)
- Propulsion: 2 shafts; 2 × diesel engines; 2 × electric motors
- Speed: 18.2 kn (33.7 km/h; 20.9 mph) surfaced; 7.3 knots (13.5 km/h; 8.4 mph) submerged
- Range: 12,000 nmi (22,000 km; 14,000 mi) at 10 knots (19 km/h; 12 mph) surfaced; 64 nmi (119 km; 74 mi) at 4 knots (7.4 km/h; 4.6 mph) submerged
- Test depth: 230 m (750 ft)
- Complement: 4 officers, 44 enlisted
- Armament: 6 × torpedo tubes (4 bow, 2 stern); 22 × 53.3 cm (21 in) torpedoes; 1 × 10.5 cm (4.1 in) SK C/32 deck gun (180 rounds); 1 × 3.7 cm (1.5 in) SK C/30 AA gun; 1 × 2 cm FlaK 30 AA guns

Service record
- Part of: 2nd U-boat Flotilla; 19 December 1940 – 4 October 1941
- Identification codes: M 22 133
- Commanders: Kptlt. Wilhelm Kleinschmidt; 19 December 1940 – 4 October 1941
- Operations: 2 patrols: 1st patrol: 5 May – 7 July 1941; 2nd patrol: 14 August – 4 October 141
- Victories: 4 merchant ships sunk (24,176 GRT); 1 merchant ship damaged (13,037 GRT)

German submarine U-111 was a Type IXB U-boat of Nazi Germany's Kriegsmarine during World War II.

She had a short career, sinking four enemy vessels and damaging one other. These victories took place over a period of two war patrols. During her first sortie, the boat sank two enemy vessels and damaged a further one. On her second patrol, U-111 sank two more enemy ships before she herself was sunk on 4 October 1941 southwest of Tenerife, by depth charges from a British warship. Out of a crew of 52 officers and men, eight died in the attack; 44 survived.

== Construction and design ==
=== Construction ===
U-111 was ordered to be built by the Kriegsmarine on 8 August 1939 (as part of Plan Z and in violation of the Treaty of Versailles). Her keel was laid down on 20 February 1940 by DeSchiMAG AG Weser in Bremen as yard number 976. Following about seven months of construction, she was launched on 15 September and commissioned on 19 December under the command of Kapitänleutnant Wilhelm Kleinschmidt.

=== Design ===
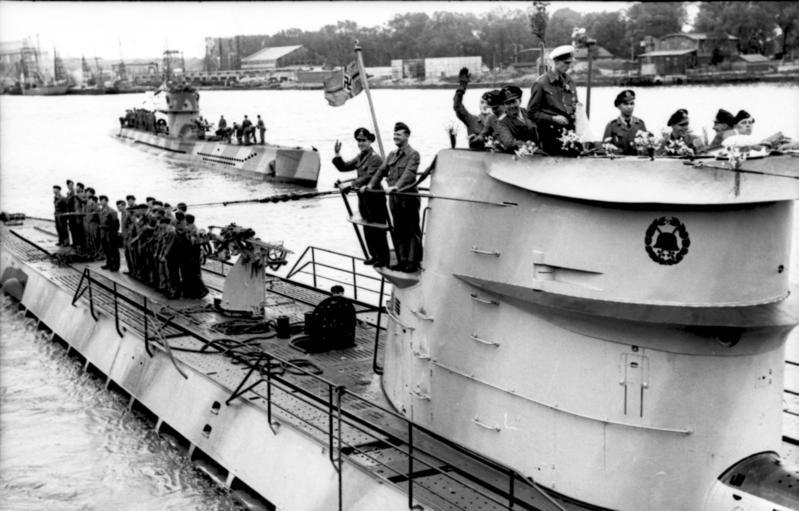
U-123, almost identical to U-111 leaving Lorient in June 1941. U-210 is in the background

Type IXB submarines were slightly larger than the original Type IX submarines, later designated IXA. U-111 had a displacement of 1,051 tonnes (1,034 long tons) when at the surface and 1,178 tonnes (1,159 long tons) while submerged. The U-boat had a total length of 76.50 m (251 ft), a pressure hull length of 58.75 m (192 ft 9 in), a beam of 6.76 m (22 ft 2 in), a height of 9.60 m (31 ft 6 in), and a draught of 4.70 m (15 ft 5 in). The submarine was powered by two MAN M 9 V 40/46 supercharged four-stroke, nine-cylinder diesel engines producing a total of 4,400 metric horsepower (3,240 kW; 4,340 shp) for use while surfaced, two Siemens-Schuckert 2 GU 345/34 double-acting electric motors producing a total of 1,000 metric horsepower (740 kW; 990 shp) for use while submerged. She had two shafts and two 1.92 m (6 ft) propellers. The boat was capable of operating at depths of up to 230 metres (750 ft).

The submarine had a maximum surface speed of 18.2 knots (33.7 km/h; 20.9 mph) and a maximum submerged speed of 7.3 knots (13.5 km/h; 8.4 mph). When submerged, the boat could operate for 64 nautical miles (119 km; 74 mi) at 4 knots (7.4 km/h; 4.6 mph); when surfaced, she could travel 12,000 nautical miles (22,000 km; 14,000 mi) at 10 knots (19 km/h; 12 mph). U-111 was fitted with six 53.3 cm (21 in) torpedo tubes (four fitted at the bow and two at the stern), 22 torpedoes, one 10.5 cm (4.13 in) SK C/32 naval gun, 180 rounds, and a 3.7 cm (1.5 in) SK C/30 as well as a 2 cm (0.79 in) C/30 anti-aircraft gun. The boat had a complement of forty-eight.

== Service history ==
=== First patrol ===
The British Steam merchantman Somersby, the first enemy vessel to be sunk by U-111

U-111 went to sea on a war patrol for the first time on 5 May 1941. For a period of 64 days, she roamed the North Sea and eventually the North Atlantic as far west as Nova Scotia in search of any Allied convoys heading to Great Britain. During that time she encountered three enemy vessels. The first confrontation took place on the 13th, just eight days after leaving port, when she came across the British merchant vessel SS Somersby and sank her just south of Iceland. On 20 May, whilst searching for the convoy HX 126, the submarine came across the tanker San Felix and fired a torpedo at her, causing damage to her hull but failing to sink her. Two days later, U-111 sank the second and last enemy vessel of her patrol, the Barnby, south of Greenland. After these victories, the boat stayed in the area to broadcast decoy signals. On 25 May, U-111 replenished from the supply ship Belchen and took fuel and food but no torpedoes. She entered the port of Lorient in occupied France on 7 July.

=== Second patrol and loss ===
U-111 left Lorient on 14 August 1941 and travelled south off the west coast of Africa and into the South Atlantic. She then turned west towards the eastern coast of Brazil. It was in these waters that the boat sank her last two enemy merchant ships. The first was the Dutch Motor merchant vessel Marken. She was torpedoed on 10 September just north of Ceará in Brazil. All of her crew survived the attack and boarded life boats. They were questioned by the crew of the U-boat, given food and released. Marken's crew were later safely picked up by a Spanish merchant vessel. Ten days later, U-111 sank her fourth and last enemy vessel, the British motor merchant ship Cingalese Prince also off Brazil. On 28 September she was involved in an action in Tarrafal Bay, in the Cape Verde islands; having been ordered to rendezvous there with two other U-boats, U-67 and U-68. She was struck by the British submarine HMS Clyde which had accidentally dived onto her after unsuccessfully attacking U–67. U-111 was so badly damaged she was left unable to dive, and was obliged to head for home.

On 4 October 1941, she was hunted down and sunk by depth charges from the British anti-submarine trawler HMS Lady Shirley southwest of Tenerife. Of a crew of 52 men, eight died and 44 survived. They were subsequently interrogated; it was the first time prisoners of war were captured from a U-boat operating in the South Atlantic. According to the lengthy interrogation report, the crew of U-111 put up a poor fight and surrendered speedily to their much less powerful adversary after their Captain was killed. The crew consisted of four officers, three chief petty officers, fourteen petty officers, and thirty ratings, plus an officer under instruction as a prospective U-boat Captain. U-111's commander, Wilhelm Kleinschmidt, was killed in the action with Lady Shirley, along with her First Lieutenant, a junior officer, and five ratings. The captured POWs said that the normal complement was 43, including officers.

=== Wolfpacks ===
U-111 took part in one wolfpack, namely:

- West (13 May - 5 June 1941)

== Summary of raiding history ==
Date	Name	Nationality	Tonnage (GRT)	Fate
13 May 1941	Somersby	United Kingdom	5,170	Sunk
20 May 1941	San Felix	United Kingdom	13,037	Damaged
22 May 1941	Barnby	United Kingdom	4,813	Sunk
10 September 1941	Marken	Netherlands	5,719	Sunk
20 September 1941	Cingalese Prince	United Kingdom	8,474	Sunk

== Bibliography ==
- Busch, Rainer; Röll, Hans-Joachim (1999). German U-boat commanders of World War II : a biographical dictionary. Translated by Brooks, Geoffrey. London, Annapolis, Md: Greenhill Books, Naval Institute Press. ISBN 1-55750-186-6.
- Busch, Rainer; Röll, Hans-Joachim (1999). Deutsche U-Boot-Verluste von September 1939 bis Mai 1945 [German U-boat losses from September 1939 to May 1945]. Der U-Boot-Krieg (in German). Vol. IV. Hamburg, Berlin, Bonn: Mittler. ISBN 3-8132-0514-2.
- Blair, Clay. Hitler's U-Boat War [Volume 1 ]: The Hunters. Cassell. ISBN 0-304-35260-8.
- Gröner, Erich; Jung, Dieter; Maass, Martin (1991). U-boats and Mine Warfare Vessels. German Warships 1815–1945. Vol. 2. Translated by Thomas, Keith; Magowan, Rachel. London: Conway Maritime Press. ISBN 0-85177-593-4.
