= SS Somersby =

British cargo steamship sunk during World War II

Coordinates: 60°39′N 26°13′W

History

United Kingdom
- Name: Somersby
- Owner: Ropner Shipping Co, Ltd
- Port of registry: West Hartlepool
- Builder: W. Gray & Co Ltd, West Hartlepool
- Launched: 10 September 1930
- Completed: 1930
- Identification: code letters LGNR (1930–33); Call sign GTQP (1934–40); UK official number: 160769
- Fate: Sunk by torpedo, 13 May 1941

General characteristics
- Type: Cargo ship
- Tonnage: 5,170 GRT; tonnage under deck 4,881; 3,176 NRT
- Length: 421.2 feet (128.4 m) p/p
- Beam: 54.2 feet (16.5 m)
- Draught: 24 feet 6 3/4 inches (7.49 m)
- Depth: 27.2 feet (8.3 m)
- Installed power: 369 NHP
- Propulsion: triple-expansion steam engine; single screw
- Crew: 39 + 4 DEMS gunners
- Sensors & processing systems: wireless direction finding

SS Somersby was a British cargo steamship that was built in 1930, sailed in a number of convoys in the Second World War and was sunk by a U-boat in 1941.

== Building ==
W. Gray & Co Ltd of West Hartlepool built Somersby, completing her in 1930. She had a three-cylinder triple expansion steam engine that was built by the Central Machine Engineering Works, also of West Hartlepool. The engine was rated at 369 NHP and drove a single screw.

Somersby's owner was Ropner Shipping Co, Ltd, which registered her in West Hartlepool.

== Second World War career ==
By the end of 1939 Somersby was sailing in convoys. That December she sailed from Liverpool to Halifax, Nova Scotia, with Convoy OB 53, and in late January 1940 she returned carrying a cargo of grain to the UK with Convoy HX 17.

In March 1940 Somersby left Liverpool with Convoy OB 103, which merged with Convoy OA-103 west of Land's End to form Convoy OG 21F to Gibraltar. In April she brought a cargo of iron ore to the UK, sailing with Convoy HG 26F from Gibraltar to Liverpool.

In June Somersby again brought iron ore to the UK, sailing with Convoy HG 33F from Gibraltar to Liverpool.

In July Somersby left Liverpool for Canada, sailing with Convoy OB 180 until it dispersed in the North Atlantic. She returned in August with a cargo of grain, sailing with Convoy SHX 63 from Sydney, Nova Scotia to Halifax where SHX 63 joined Convoy HX 63 to Liverpool.

In September Somersby left Britain for Canada, sailing with Convoy OA-209 from Methil in Scotland until it dispersed in the North Atlantic. She returned in October with a cargo of flour, sailing via Sydney, Nova Scotia, where she joined Convoy SC 7 bound for the UK. SC 7 left Sydney on 5 October. At first the convoy had only one escort ship, the Hastings-class sloop HMS Scarborough. A wolf pack of U-boats found the convoy on 16 October and quickly overwhelmed it, sinking many ships over the next few days, but Somersby was one of the few that survived. She reached the Firth of Clyde, where she joined Convoy WN-25 that took her around Cape Wrath to Methil.

Somersby sailed again across the North Atlantic to Canada via Convoy EN-30 from Methil to Oban at the end of November and then Convoy OB 253 at the beginning of December from Liverpool until it dispersed in the North Atlantic. In January and February 1941 she brought a cargo of grain to Britain, crossing the North Atlantic with Convoy SC 21 from Halifax and then joining Convoy WN-89 from the Clyde to Methil.

In April 1941 Somersby again sailed from Britain to Canada, sailing with Convoy OB 308 from Liverpool until it dispersed in the North Atlantic.

== Convoy SC 30 and sinking ==
At the end of April 1941 Somersby left Canada carrying 8,300 tons of grain destined for Hull. Her Master was John William Thompson. She went via Halifax, where she joined Convoy SC 30. SC 30 was bound for Liverpool, but Somersby was to leave the convoy off Scotland and proceed to Loch Ewe to join a convoy around Cape Wrath to the east coast of Britain.

Somersby left Halifax with SC 30 on 29 April but orders were given to scatter the convoy, due to the presence of German U boats in the area. On the morning of 13 May she was southwest of Reykjavík when the German submarine U-111, commanded by Kapitänleutnant Wilhelm Kleinschmidt, sighted her at 1141 hrs and fired two torpedoes. One struck the freighter amidships but she remained afloat. At 1246 hrs the U-boat fired a coup de grâce that hit Somersby's bow, causing her to sink nose first and her rudder was out of the water. She sank fast. Captain Thompson, his 38 crew and four DEMS gunners all successfully abandoned ship. The conditions were calm with a slight swell. They survived and were rescued by the Greek cargo steamship Marika Protopapa, which landed them at Loch Ewe.
