= SS Rajputana =

1925 liner turned cruiser

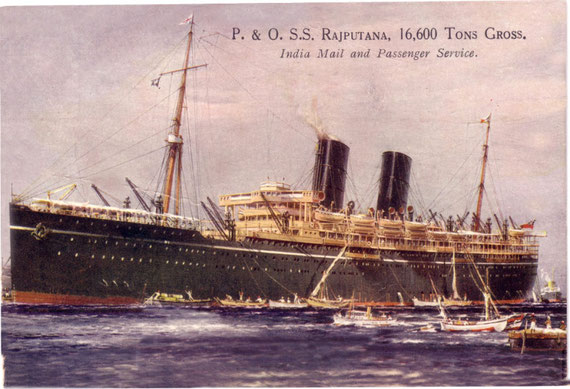
- SS Rajputana

History

United Kingdom
- Name: Rajputana
- Builder: Harland & Wolff, Greenock
- Yard number: 661
- Laid down: 1925
- Launched: 6 August 1925
- Completed: 30 December 1925
- Acquired: September 1939
- Commissioned: December 1939
- Reclassified: Armed merchant cruiser
- Home port: London
- Fate: Torpedoed and sunk 13 April 1941, in position 65°50′N 27°25′W

General characteristics
- Tonnage: 16,568 GRT; 8,755 DWT
- Length: 547 ft (166.7 m)
- Beam: 71 ft (21.6 m)
- Propulsion: Quad expansion steam engine
- Speed: 17 knots (31 km/h; 20 mph)
- Complement: 323 (as armed cruiser)
- Armament: 8 × 6 in (152 mm) guns; 2 × 3 in (76 mm) guns

SS Rajputana was a British passenger and cargo carrying ocean liner. She was built for the Peninsular & Oriental Steam Navigation Company at the Harland & Wolff shipyard at Greenock on the lower River Clyde, Scotland in 1925. She was one of the P&O R-class liners from 1925 that had much of their interiors designed by Lord Inchcape's daughter Elsie Mackay. Named after the Rajputana region of western India, she sailed on a regular route between England and British India.

She was requisitioned into the Royal Navy at the onset of World War II, outfitted in December 1939 at Yarrows, in Esquimalt, as an armed merchant cruiser and commissioned HMS Rajputana. The installation of eight six-inch guns gave her the firepower of a light cruiser without the armor protection. She was torpedoed and sunk off Iceland on 13 April 1941, after escorting a convoy across the North Atlantic.

== World War II ==
In the Battle of the Atlantic HMS Rajputana escorted several North Atlantic convoys from Bermuda and Halifax, Nova Scotia including BHX 42, BHX 45, BHX 49, BHX 52, BHX 54, BHX 61, BHX 64, BHX 71, BHX 83, BHX 94, BHX 101, BHX 111 and BHX 117.

On 13 April 1941, four days after parting company with convoy HX 117, she was torpedoed by U-108 under Klaus Scholtz in the Denmark Strait west of Reykjavík, Iceland. She sank over an hour later with the loss of 42 men, including her last civilian captain Commander C. T. O. Richardson, and four officers.

A total of 283 of her crew were saved by the destroyer HMS Legion and Polish ORP Piorun, some of them after spending twelve hours in overcrowded lifeboats. Among the survivors was Daniel Lionel Hanington, who later become a rear admiral in the Royal Canadian Navy.

== Passengers ==
The following are some notable passengers who sailed in the SS Rajputana.

- In 1935 Paramahansa Yogananda and his troupe arrived in Bombay after completing a trip through the holy land.
- On 12 January 1929 Lawrence of Arabia boarded the ship in Karachi, British India, arriving in Plymouth in February 1929.
- On 29 August 1931 Meher Baba departed Bombay for London on Rajputana. Onboard he met with Mahatma Gandhi who was sailing to the second Round Table Conference in London.
- On 7 September 1931 Egyptian essayist and author Mohammed Lotfy Gomaa boarded the ship in Port Said to meet with Mahatma Gandhi: the meeting lasted for eight hours.

== Bibliography ==
- Osborne, Richard; Spong, Harry & Grover, Tom (2007). Armed Merchant Cruisers 1878–1945. Windsor, UK: World Warship Society. ISBN 978-0-9543310-8-5.
- "RAJPUTANA (1925)". poheritage.com. Ship factsheet at P&O Heritage.
