= German submarine U-108 (1940) =

German World War II submarine

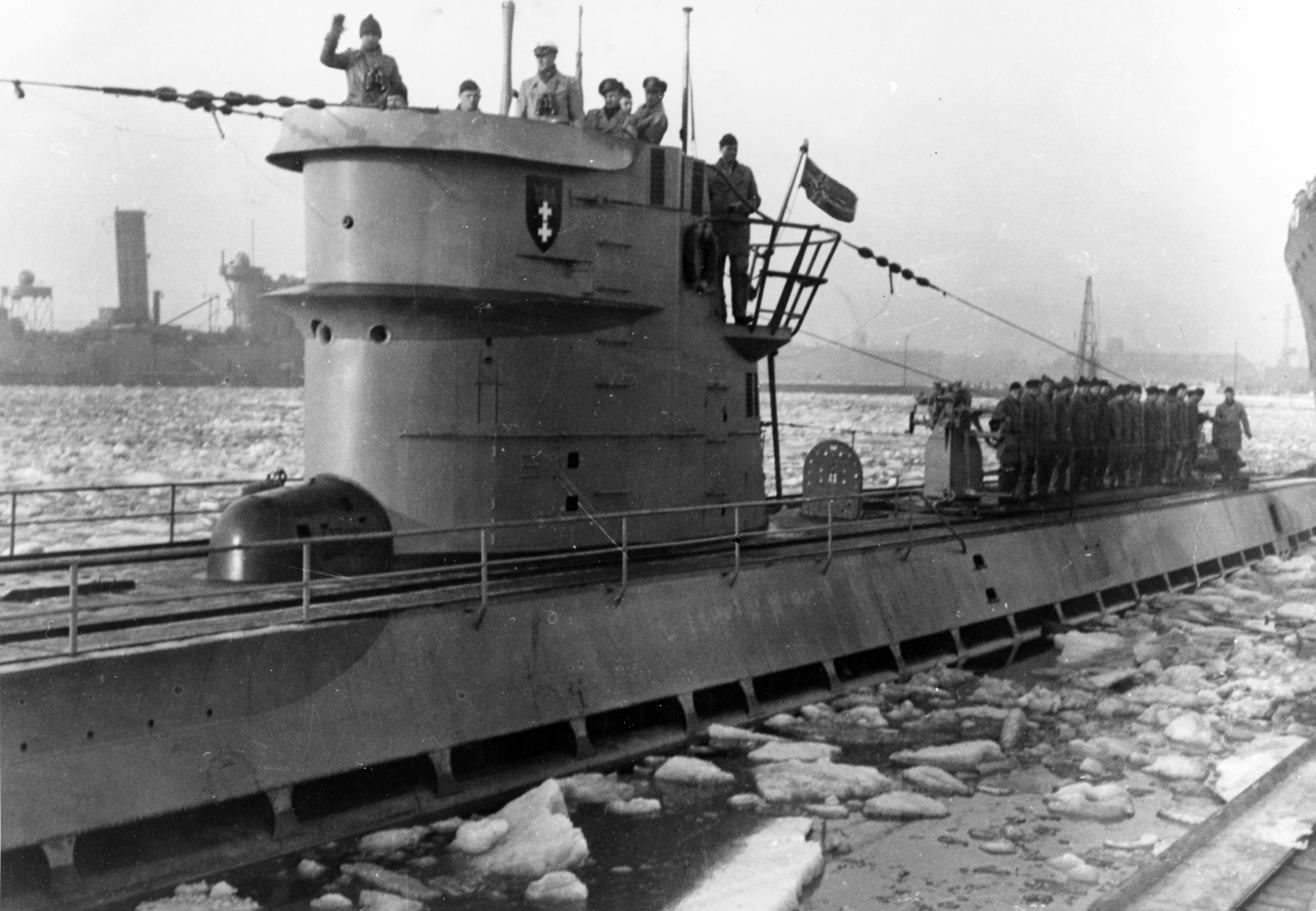
- U-108 in Germany, winter 1940-1941, the man in white cap is korvetten-captain Klaus Scholtz

History

Nazi Germany
- Name: U-108
- Ordered: 24 May 1938
- Builder: DeSchiMAG AG Weser, Bremen
- Yard number: 971
- Laid down: 27 December 1938
- Launched: 15 July 1940
- Commissioned: 22 October 1940
- Home port: Lorient, France
- Fate: Sunk, 11 April 1944

General characteristics
- Class & type: Type IXB U-boat
- Displacement: 1,051 t (1,034 long tons) surfaced; 1,178 t (1,159 long tons) submerged
- Length: 76.50 m (251 ft) o/a; 58.75 m (192 ft 9 in) pressure hull
- Beam: 6.76 m (22 ft 2 in) o/a; 4.40 m (14 ft 5 in) pressure hull
- Height: 9.60 m (31 ft 6 in)
- Draught: 4.70 m (15 ft 5 in)
- Installed power: 4,400 PS (3,200 kW; 4,300 bhp) (diesels); 1,000 PS (740 kW; 990 shp) (electric)
- Propulsion: 2 shafts; 2 × diesel engines; 2 × electric motors
- Speed: 18.2 knots (33.7 km/h; 20.9 mph) surfaced; 7.3 knots (13.5 km/h; 8.4 mph) submerged
- Range: 12,000 nmi (22,000 km; 14,000 mi) at 10 knots (19 km/h; 12 mph) surfaced; 64 nmi (119 km; 74 mi) at 4 knots (7.4 km/h; 4.6 mph) submerged
- Test depth: 230 m (750 ft)
- Complement: 48 to 56 officers and ratings
- Armament: 6 × torpedo tubes (4 bow, 2 stern); 22 × 53.3 cm (21 in) torpedoes; 1 × 10.5 cm (4.1 in) SK C/32 deck gun (180 rounds); 1 × 3.7 cm (1.5 in) SK C/30 AA gun; 1 × twin 2 cm FlaK 30 AA guns

Service record
- Part of: 2nd U-boat Flotilla; 22 October 1940 – 31 August 1943; 8th U-boat Flotilla; 1 September 1943 – 11 April 1944
- Identification codes: M 27 968
- Commanders: K.Kapt. Klaus Scholtz; 22 October 1940 – 14 October 1942; Oblt.z.S. Erich Hilsenitz; October 1942 (in representation); K.Kapt. Ralf-Reimar Wolfram; 15 October 1942 – 16 October 1943; Oblt.z.S. Matthias Brünig; 17 October 1943 – 11 April 1944
- Operations: 11 patrols: 1st patrol: 15 February – 12 March 1941; 2nd patrol: 3 April – 2 May 1941; 3rd patrol: 25 May – 7 July 1941; 4th patrol: 19 August – 21 October 1941; 5th patrol: 9 – 25 December 1941; 6th patrol: 8 January – 4 March 1942; 7th patrol: 30 March – 1 June 1942; 8th patrol: 13 July – 10 September 1942; 9th patrol: 25 October – 26 November 1942; 10th patrol: 20 January – 24 February 1943; 11th patrol: 1 April – 16 May 1943
- Victories: 25 merchant ships sunk (118,722 GRT); 1 auxiliary warship sunk (16,644 GRT)

German submarine U-108 was a Type IXB U-boat of Nazi Germany's Kriegsmarine that operated during World War II. She was laid down at DeSchiMAG AG Weser in Bremen as yard number 971 on 27 December 1938, launched on 15 July 1940 and commissioned on 22 October under Korvettenkapitän Klaus Scholtz.

Her service career began with training as part of the 2nd U-boat Flotilla; she went on to operations, first with the second flotilla, then with the 8th U-boat Flotilla.

== Design ==
Type IXB submarines were slightly larger than the original Type IX submarines, later designated IXA. U-108 had a displacement of 1,051 tonnes (1,034 long tons) when at the surface and 1,178 tonnes (1,159 long tons) while submerged. The U-boat had a total length of 76.50 m (251 ft), a pressure hull length of 58.75 m (192 ft 9 in), a beam of 6.76 m (22 ft 2 in), a height of 9.60 m (31 ft 6 in), and a draught of 4.70 m (15 ft 5 in). The submarine was powered by two MAN M 9 V 40/46 supercharged four-stroke, nine-cylinder diesel engines producing a total of 4,400 metric horsepower (3,240 kW; 4,340 shp) for use while surfaced, two Siemens-Schuckert 2 GU 345/34 double-acting electric motors producing a total of 1,000 metric horsepower (740 kW; 990 shp) for use while submerged. She had two shafts and two 1.92 m (6 ft) propellers. The boat was capable of operating at depths of up to 230 metres (750 ft).

The submarine had a maximum surface speed of 18.2 knots (33.7 km/h; 20.9 mph) and a maximum submerged speed of 7.3 knots (13.5 km/h; 8.4 mph). When submerged, the boat could operate for 64 nautical miles (119 km; 74 mi) at 4 knots (7.4 km/h; 4.6 mph); when surfaced, she could travel 12,000 nautical miles (22,000 km; 14,000 mi) at 10 knots (19 km/h; 12 mph). U-108 was fitted with six 53.3 cm (21 in) torpedo tubes (four fitted at the bow and two at the stern), 22 torpedoes, one 10.5 cm (4.13 in) SK C/32 naval gun, 180 rounds, and a 3.7 cm (1.5 in) SK C/30 as well as a 2 cm (0.79 in) C/30 anti-aircraft gun. The boat had a complement of forty-eight.

== Service history ==
U-108 carried out eleven war patrols, during which she sank 25 ships, a total of 118,722 gross register tons (GRT) and one auxiliary warship of 16,644 GRT. She was a member of seven wolfpacks.

=== First, second and third patrols ===
The boat's first patrol began with her departure from Wilhelmshaven on 15 February 1941. She crossed the North Sea and entered the Atlantic via the gap between Iceland and the Faroe Islands, sinking Texelstroom on 22 February. She also sank Effna on the 28th; both ships met their end south of Iceland. She then docked at Lorient in occupied France on 12 March. She would be based there for most of the rest of her career.

Her second foray involved the sinking of HMS Rajputana, an armed merchant cruiser, west of Reykjavík on 13 April 1941. The Convoy Commodore, four officers and 35 ratings were lost. After this patrol the crew of U-108 made an image of a polar bear at conning tower.

U-108 sank Michael E., a CAM ship or 'Catapult Armed Merchantman', on the submarine's third patrol on 2 June 1941 in mid-Atlantic. She went on to sink Baron Nairn west of Cape Race (eastern Newfoundland and Labrador) on the eighth; the Greek ship Dirphys 600 nautical miles (1,100 km; 690 mi) east of Newfoundland, also on 8 July; Christian Krohg on the tenth; Ellinco on the 25th; Nicholas Pateras on the same day and Toronto on 1 July. The latter was a weather ship situated about 500 nmi (930 km; 580 mi) north of the Azores.

=== Fourth, fifth and sixth patrols ===
Patrol number four saw the boat covering the 'gap' between South America and Africa. She departed Lorient on 19 August 1941 and returned on 21 October.

She sank Cassequel, a neutral vessel, on 14 December 1941, 160 nmi (300 km; 180 mi) southwest of Cape St. Vincent, Portugal and Ruckinge (convoy HG 76) on the 19th, west of Lisbon as part of her fifth sortie.

The boat's sixth patrol, as part of Operation Drumbeat (Paukenschlag), took her to the east coast of North America where she was again successful, sinking Ocean Venture on 8 February 1942, Tolosa on the ninth and Blink on the 12th. The U-boat had chased Blink, which had been hit by a non-detonating torpedo, the two vessels almost collided; which was only avoided by U-108 diving underneath the merchant ship.

She also sank Ramapo northwest of Bermuda on 16 February and Somme on the 18th.

=== Seventh, eighth and ninth patrols ===
The boat's seventh patrol was almost as successful as her sixth, sinking Modesta on 25 April 1942, Mobiloil on the 29th (which required a total of six torpedoes and many rounds from the 20mm and 37mm guns), Afoundria on 5 May, and Abgara a day later. On the return leg she encountered Norland on the 25th.

More success pennants were flown after her eighth patrol, which took her almost to the northern South American coast. She sank Tricula on 3 August 1942, Breňas on the seventh and Louisiana on the 17th.

The boat's ninth patrol was carried out in opposition to Operation Torch, (the Allied landings in North Africa). The submarine had not been off Morocco long before being attacked by a destroyer. The damage incurred was serious enough that the boat was obliged to return to France where effective repairs might be carried out.

=== Tenth and eleventh patrols ===
The U-boat was attacked by a Catalina flying boat of 202 Squadron RAF on 10 February 1943 west of Morocco. The damage to the forward torpedo tubes forced her to return to Lorient.

In her last operational patrol, she departed Lorient on 1 April 1943. On 19 April 1943 U-108 sank the American Robert Gray from Convoy HX 234. The Liberty ship had straggled behind the convoy. She was torpedoed and sunk in the Atlantic Ocean (50°57′N 40°35′W) with the loss of all 62 crew. U-108 was attacked by a destroyer on the 22nd but continued to shadow Convoy ON (S) 4 southeast of Greenland. She arrived at Stettin (now Szczecin, Poland) on 16 May. She was eventually bombed and sunk there on 11 April, before being raised and decommissioned on 17 July 1944. She was ultimately scuttled there on 24 April 1945.

=== Wolfpacks ===
U-108 took part in seven wolfpacks, namely.

- West (2 – 20 June 1941)
- Seeräuber (14 – 22 December 1941)
- Schlagetot (9 – 17 November 1942)
- Rochen (28 January - 11 February 1943)
- Adler (7 – 13 April 1943)
- Meise (13 – 27 April 1943)
- Specht (27 – 28 April 1943)

== Summary of raiding history ==
| Date | Ship | Nationality | Tonnage (Note: Merchant ship tonnages are in gross register tons. Military vessels are listed by tons displacement.) | Fate |
|---|---|---|---|---|
| 22 February 1941 | Texelstroom | Netherlands | 1,617 | Sunk |
| 28 February 1941 | Effna | United Kingdom | 6,461 | Sunk |
| 13 April 1941 | HMS Rajputana | Royal Navy | 16,644 | Sunk |
| 2 June 1941 | Michael E | United Kingdom | 7,628 | Sunk |
| 8 June 1941 | Baron Nairn | United Kingdom | 3,164 | Sunk |
| 8 June 1941 | Dirphys | Greece | 4,240 | Sunk |
| 10 June 1941 | Christian Krohg | Norway | 1,992 | Sunk |
| 25 June 1941 | Ellinco | Greece | 3,059 | Sunk |
| 25 June 1941 | Nicholas Pateras | Greece | 4,362 | Sunk |
| 1 July 1941 | Toronto City | United Kingdom | 2,486 | Sunk |
| 14 December 1941 | Cassequel | Portugal | 4,751 | Sunk |
| 19 December 1941 | Ruckinge | United Kingdom | 2,869 | Sunk |
| 2 February 1942 | Ocean Venture | United Kingdom | 7,174 | Sunk |
| 9 February 1942 | Tolosa | Norway | 1,974 | Sunk |
| 12 February 1942 | Blink | Norway | 2,701 | Sunk |
| 16 February 1942 | Ramapo | Panama | 2,968 | Sunk |
| 18 February 1942 | Somme | United Kingdom | 5,265 | Sunk |
| 25 April 1942 | Modesta | United Kingdom | 3,849 | Sunk |
| 29 April 1942 | Mobiloil | United States | 9,925 | Sunk |
| 5 May 1942 | Afoundria | United States | 5,010 | Sunk |
| 6 May 1942 | Abgara | Latvia | 4,422 | Sunk |
| 20 May 1942 | Norland | Norway | 8,134 | Sunk |
| 3 August 1942 | Tricula | United Kingdom | 6,221 | Sunk |
| 7 August 1942 | Breñas | Norway | 2,687 | Sunk |
| 17 August 1942 | Louisiana | United States | 8,587 | Sunk |
| 19 April 1943 | Robert Gray | United States | 7,176 | Sunk |

== Bibliography ==
- Busch, Rainer; Röll, Hans-Joachim (1999). German U-boat commanders of World War II : a biographical dictionary. Translated by Brooks, Geoffrey. London, Annapolis, Md: Greenhill Books, Naval Institute Press. ISBN 1-55750-186-6.
- Busch, Rainer; Röll, Hans-Joachim (1999). Deutsche U-Boot-Verluste von September 1939 bis Mai 1945 [German U-boat losses from September 1939 to May 1945]. Der U-Boot-Krieg (in German). Vol. IV. Hamburg, Berlin, Bonn: Mittler. ISBN 3-8132-0514-2.
- Gröner, Erich; Jung, Dieter; Maass, Martin (1991). German Warships 1815–1945, U-boats and Mine Warfare Vessels. Vol. 2. Translated by Thomas, Keith; Magowan, Rachel. London: Conway Maritime Press. ISBN 0-85177-593-4.
- Kemp, Paul (1997). U-Boats Destroyed, German Submarine Losses in the World Wars. Arms and Armour. ISBN 1-85409-515-3.
