= German submarine U-109 (1940) =

German World War II submarine

Coordinates: 47.22°N 22.40°W

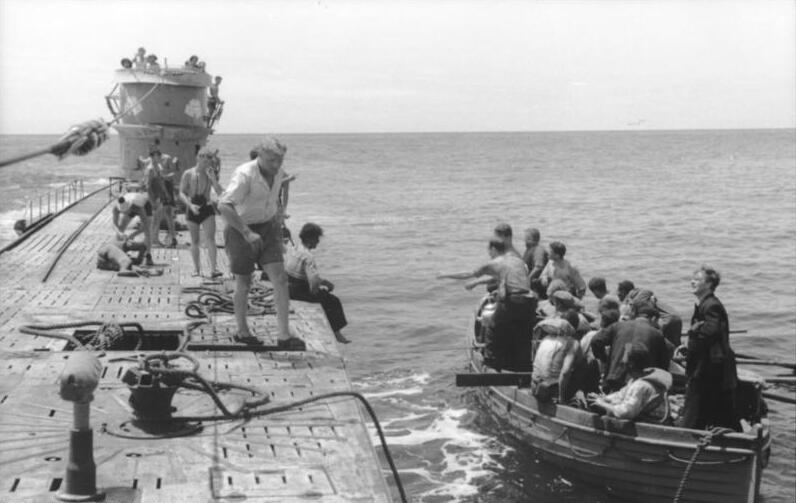
- U-107, a U-boat identical to U-109

History

Nazi Germany
- Name: U-109
- Ordered: 24 May 1938
- Builder: DeSchiMAG AG Weser, Bremen
- Yard number: 972
- Laid down: 9 March 1940
- Launched: 14 September 1940
- Commissioned: 5 December 1940
- Fate: Sunk on 4 May 1943

General characteristics
- Class & type: Type IXB submarine
- Displacement: 1,051 t (1,034 long tons) surfaced; 1,178 t (1,159 long tons) submerged
- Length: 76.50 m (251 ft) o/a; 58.75 m (192 ft 9 in) pressure hull
- Beam: 6.76 m (22 ft 2 in) overall; 4.40 m (14 ft 5 in) pressure hull
- Height: 9.60 m (31 ft 6 in)
- Draught: 4.70 m (15 ft 5 in)
- Installed power: 4,400 PS (3,200 kW; 4,300 bhp) (diesels); 1,000 PS (740 kW; 990 shp) (electric)
- Propulsion: 2 shafts; 2 × diesel engines; 2 × electric motors
- Speed: 18.2 knots (33.7 km/h; 20.9 mph) surfaced; 7.3 knots (13.5 km/h; 8.4 mph) submerged
- Range: 12,000 nmi (22,000 km; 14,000 mi) at 10 knots (19 km/h; 12 mph) surfaced; 64 nmi (119 km; 74 mi) at 4 knots (7.4 km/h; 4.6 mph) submerged
- Test depth: 230 m (750 ft)
- Complement: 48 to 56 officers and ratings
- Armament: 6 × torpedo tubes (4 bow, 2 stern); 22 × 53.3 cm (21 in) torpedoes; 1 × 10.5 cm (4.1 in) SK C/32 deck gun (180 rounds); 1 × 3.7 cm (1.5 in) SK C/30 AA gun; 1 × 2 cm FlaK 30 AA guns

Service record
- Part of: 2nd U-boat Flotilla; 5 Dec 1940 – 4 May 1943
- Identification codes: M 15 099
- Commanders: K.Kapt. Hans-Georg Fischer; 5 December 1940 – 4 June 1941; Kptlt. Heinrich Bleichrodt; 5 June 1941 – 31 January 1943; Oblt.z.S. Joachim Schramm; 1 March – 4 May 1943
- Operations: 9 patrols: 1st patrol: 6 – 29 May 1941; 2nd patrol: a. 28 June – 17 August 1941; b. 21 – 22 September 1941; 3rd patrol: 5 October – 18 November 1941; 4th patrol: 27 December 1941 – 23 February 1942; 5th patrol: 25 March – 3 June 1942; 6th patrol: 18 July – 6 October 1942; 7th patrol: 28 November 1942 – 23 January 1943; 8th patrol: 3 March – 1 April 1943; 9th patrol: 28 April – 4 May 1943
- Victories: 12 merchant ships sunk (79,969 GRT); 1 merchant ship damaged (6,548 GRT)

The German submarine U-109 was a Type IXB U-boat of Nazi Germany's Kriegsmarine that operated during World War II. She conducted nine war-patrols, sinking 12 ships and damaging one. All but one of these were during the six patrols she carried out under the command of Heinrich Bleichrodt.

On 4 May 1943, she was sunk with all hands by a B-24 Liberator, operated by 86 Squadron RAF.

== Construction and design ==
=== Construction ===
U-109 was ordered by the Kriegsmarine on 24 May 1938. Her keel was laid down on 9 March 1940 by DeSchiMAG AG Weser, Bremen as yard number 972. U-109 was launched on 14 September 1940 and commissioned on 5 December under the command of Hans-Georg Fischer.

=== Design ===
Type IXB submarines were slightly larger than the original Type IX submarines, later designated IXA. U-109 had a displacement of 1,051 tonnes (1,034 long tons) when at the surface and 1,178 tonnes (1,159 long tons) while submerged. The U-boat had a total length of 76.50 m (251 ft), a pressure hull length of 58.75 m (192 ft 9 in), a beam of 6.76 m (22 ft 2 in), a height of 9.60 m (31 ft 6 in), and a draught of 4.70 m (15 ft 5 in). The submarine was powered by two MAN M 9 V 40/46 supercharged four-stroke, nine-cylinder diesel engines producing a total of 4,400 metric horsepower (3,240 kW; 4,340 shp) for use while surfaced, two Siemens-Schuckert 2 GU 345/34 double-acting electric motors producing a total of 1,000 metric horsepower (740 kW; 990 shp) for use while submerged. She had two shafts and two 1.92 m (6 ft) propellers. The boat was capable of operating at depths of up to 230 metres (750 ft).

The submarine had a maximum surface speed of 18.2 knots (33.7 km/h; 20.9 mph) and a maximum submerged speed of 7.3 knots (13.5 km/h; 8.4 mph). When submerged, the boat could operate for 64 nautical miles (119 km; 74 mi) at 4 knots (7.4 km/h; 4.6 mph); when surfaced, she could travel 12,000 nautical miles (22,000 km; 14,000 mi) at 10 knots (19 km/h; 12 mph). U-109 was fitted with six 53.3 cm (21 in) torpedo tubes (four fitted at the bow and two at the stern), 22 torpedoes, one 10.5 cm (4.13 in) SK C/32 naval gun, 180 rounds, and a 3.7 cm (1.5 in) SK C/30 as well as a 2 cm (0.79 in) C/30 anti-aircraft gun. The boat had a complement of forty-eight.

== Service history ==
U-109 conducted a total of nine war patrols in her career and sank twelve enemy vessels with a total of 79,969 gross register tons (GRT). She also damaged one other of 6,548 GRT.

=== Training ===
U-109 was commissioned on 5 December 1940 in Bremen. She was allocated to the 2nd U-boat Flotilla based at Kiel, and from 20 December, Danzig. On 1 March the boat participated in tactical exercises simulating convoy attacks. The performance of Korvettenkapitän Hans-Georg Fischer was graded as insufficient and U-109 had repeat the exercise. She was then transferred to active service, continuing as part of 2. Unterseebootsflottille, on 1 May.

=== First patrol ===
U-109 left Kiel on 6 May. For 24 days, she roamed the North Sea and the North Atlantic in search of Allied convoys bound for Britain.

On 13 May she was assigned to Wolfpack West, SSE of Cape Farewell, Greenland. An attack was commenced on 15 May, but moments before launching torpedoes, it was noted that the target was a neutral, and the attack halted.

On 19 May U-109 began pursuit of convoy HX 126, which had been found by U-94. U-109 found the convoy a day later, but was driven off by an escort and depth charged. U-109 lost contact with the convoy, but sank a straggler. Many earlier sources name the ship sunk by U-109 as the British steamship Marconi, but more recent sources conclude it was the British steam merchantman Harpagus. The convoy escorts counterattacked, and damage from depth charges forced U-109 to return to France.

En route, U-109 sought to intercept British warships pursuing the German battleship Bismarck, also attempting to escape to France after being damaged in the Battle of the Denmark Strait, but failed to find any.

When U-109 was close to the French coast, a periscope was sighted, but no warning was given to other U-boats. A few hours later the British submarine fired six torpedoes at U-74, all of which missed.

On 29 May U-109 entered the German occupied port of Lorient in France. This city was to remain her home base for the remainder of her career.

The 1st and 2nd Watch Officers, Keller and Schartzkopff (who later became U-boat commanders themselves) complained about the performance of their commander and as a result, K.Kapt Hans-Georg Fischer was replaced by Kptlt. Heinrich Bleichrodt.

=== Second patrol ===
Her second voyage began on 28 June 1941 when she left her home port of Lorient. The orders were to attack shipping around Freetown, West Africa, together with three other U-boats. For such a long range mission, a resupply stop was planned with the German tanker Corrientes, which was interned in harbour at the Canary Isles. But due to British pressure, the Spanish authorities forbade the resupplying of U-boats from there, and the mission to Freetown had to be cancelled. Instead U-109 patrolled West of the Canaries.

On 6 July U-109 started to chase a fast ship, the City of Auckland. She only reached a position from which to mount an attack one day later, but four torpedoes fired all missed. After the failed torpedo attack, U-109 tried her deck gun, but the City of Auckland laid a smokescreen, returned fire and escaped.

In the night of 21 to 22 July U-109 slipped into Cadiz, Spain to refuel from the tanker Thalia. After refuelling she joined Wolfpack Süd, which was sailing towards the Canary Isles. On 30 July the boat was ordered to steer towards Gibraltar, in order to be ready to intercept the next HG convoy. When German agents detected convoy HG 70 left Girbralter on 9 August, U-109 joined the hunt for the convoy, but could not make contact with it. She received some depth charge damage from escorts and on the night of 13 August had to return to base. U-109 arrived in Lorient on 17 August.

=== Third patrol ===
After leaving Lorient on 21 September, many problems were discovered during the first deep dive test, and U-109 had to return to Lorient, arriving the next day.

A second attempt was made on 5 October 1941, and she proceeded southeast of Greenland to form the nucleus of Wolfpack Mordbrenner together with three other boats. More boats were to join, but one of them, U-553, discovered convoy SC 48 and these boats were diverted to attack this convoy.U-109 did not participate in this action, but instead was sent further northwest toward the Strait of Belle Isle. Special permission from Hitler was needed for this move, as at this stage of the war, policy was to avoid conflict with America and respect the neutrality zone. No convoys or ships were found, since thanks to 'ULTRA' decrypts, the British were able to reroute convoys around U-boat positions.

At the end of October, Wolfpack Reisswolf had found and attacked convoy ON 28, with little success. Two of the Reisswolf boats shadowed the convoy and tried to call in the Mordbrenner Wolfpack. On the morning of 1 November U-109 sighted two escorts and at midday botched an attack on two large ships. U-109 chased the convoy as far as the Cabot strait but could not attack.

On 2 November the U-109 was detached from Wolfpack Mordbrenner to operate independently. U-109 steered south, but on 5 November was assigned to escort the blockade runner Silvaplana ( a prize ship of the raider Atlantis ) back to France.

U-109 arrived in Lorient on 18 November after spending 45 days at sea and without sinking any vessels.

=== Fourth patrol ===
The U-boat left Lorient on 27 December 1941 for the eastern seaboard of the United States as part of Operation Paukenschlag (Drumbeat). Initially she was allocated to the area off the coast of Nova Scotia, between Halifax and New York. While the other boats of the group enjoyed success after the start of the operation on 13 January 1942, U-109 had to wait till 19 January before she sighted her first ship. U-109's torpedoes missed five times, and the attack was broken off when the ship reached Cape Sable. The next day a fast ship was missed with one torpedo. She sank her first enemy vessel, the British merchant vessel Thirlby on 23 January. Two days later an attack on a ship was broken off when two escorts showed up. Bleichrodt then decided to leave the empty shipping lanes off Canada and headed for New York. In order to be able to continue the operation, Bleichrodt requested fuel from U-130 which has expended all her torpedoes but had fuel to spare. When preparing for the fuel transfer on 31 January, the British merchantman Tacoma Star was sighted. U-109 gave chase and sank the vessel the next day. Due to bad weather and navigational errors a new rendezvous with U-130 was delayed until 4 February, when once again a vessel was sighted and chased. U-109 sank the Canadian tanker Montrolite on 5 February, and then sighted the Panamanian Halcyon on 6 February. An attack with the last two torpedoes failed and the ship was sunk with the deck guns. The fuel transfer was finally executed on 6 February and U-109 could return to France. On 16 February, the U-boat blundered into a convoy in heavy fog, but did not report the convoy, as U-82 was recently reported lost at the same place just after reporting a convoy. U-109 returned to Lorient on 23 February 1942, she was reported by the BBC to be sunk and the crew taken prisoner.

During her first attack on 19 January, the Empire Kingfisher sent out distress signals of being torpedoed. Since U-109 was the only boat in the immediate vicinity of the Empire Kingfisher, U-109 was credited with the sinking. However, the Empire Kingfisher had struck an uncharted rock and had mistaken the shock of the collision for a torpedo impact.

=== Fifth patrol ===
The fifth patrol was also eventful. Having left Lorient on 25 March 1942, U-109 headed to the southern coast of the United States. On 20 April, she sank the British merchant vessel Harpagon. This was followed by the damaging of the British ship La Paz off the coast of Florida on 1 May. Two days later on 3 May, U-109 torpedoed and sank the Dutch vessel Laertes. She returned to Lorient on 3 June 1942, after 72 days at sea.

=== Sixth patrol ===
Like her second patrol, U-109's sixth foray took place off the coast of Africa. For 81 days, she travelled as far south as the Gold Coast and sank five enemy vessels: the Norwegian Arthur W. Sewall on 7 August; and a further four British vessels, Vimeira on 11 August, Ocean Might on 3 September, Tuscan Star on 6 September and Peterton on 17 September. U-109 then returned to Lorient on 6 October 1942.

=== Seventh patrol ===
U-109 left Lorient on 28 November 1942 and sailed south, to the northern coast of South America. On her way she attacked a naval force but suffered a heavy depth charge counterattack. Off Trinidad on 26 December, U-109 suffered another depth charge counterattack from a lone ship she had attacked, and as a result Bleichrodt had a nervous breakdown. On 30 December the 1st Watch Officer had to take over and he brought the U-boat back to base. U-109 rendezvoused with U-558 which transferred a backup officer to her.

On 23 January 1943, she returned to Lorient without any victories. Bleichrodt was transferred to hospital and left U-109.

=== Eighth patrol ===
U-109 left port on 3 March and travelled as far south as the Azores, circled the island chain and returned to Lorient on 1 April after 30 days at sea and without sighting any enemy vessels.

=== Loss ===
U-109's ninth and last voyage took place from 28 April 1943, when she left Lorient, until 4 May. She was sunk by four depth charges from an RAF Liberator of 89 Squadron south of Ireland. The aircraft was flying to a rendezvous with an Allied convoy north-east of the Azores when it detected the boat with its H2S radar. The U-boat was seen to surface before slowly sinking, apparently with enough time for the crew to abandon her, although none were seen to emerge from her hatches. It is assumed that all 52 of her crew went down with her.

=== Wolfpacks ===
U-109 was part of four Wolfpacks:

- West (13 – 23 May 1941)
- Süd (22 July - 5 August 1941)
- Mordbrenner (16 October - 3 November 1941)
- Wohlgemut (12 – 18 March 1943)

== Summary of raiding history ==
Date	Commander	Patrol	Ship	Nationality	Tonnage	Fate
20 May 1941	Fischer	1	Harpagus	United Kingdom	5,173	Sunk
23 January 1942	Bleichrodt	4	Thirlby	United Kingdom	4,887	Sunk
1 February 1942	Bleichrodt	4	Tacoma Star	United Kingdom	7,924	Sunk
5 February 1942	Bleichrodt	4	Montrolite	Canada	11,309	Sunk
6 February 1942	Bleichrodt	4	Halcyon	Panama	3,531	Sunk
20 April 1942	Bleichrodt	5	Harpagon	United Kingdom	5,719	Sunk
20 April 1942	Bleichrodt	5	La Paz	United Kingdom	6,548	Damaged
3 May 1942	Bleichrodt	5	Laertes	Netherlands	5,825	Sunk
7 August 1942	Bleichrodt	6	Arthur W. Sewall	Norway	6,030	Sunk
11 August 1942	Bleichrodt	6	Vimeira	United Kingdom	5,728	Sunk
3 September 1942	Bleichrodt	6	Ocean Might	United Kingdom	7,173	Sunk
6 September 1942	Bleichrodt	6	Tuscan Star	United Kingdom	11,449	Sunk
17 September 1942	Bleichrodt	6	Peterton	United Kingdom	5,221	Sunk

== Bibliography ==
- Blair, Clay (1998a). Hitler's U-Boat War [Volume 1 ]: The Hunters 1939-1942. Cassell. ISBN 0-304-35260-8.
- Blair, Clay (1998b). Hitler's U-Boat War [Volume 2]: The Hunted 1942–1945. Cassell. ISBN 0-304-35261-6.
- Busch, Rainer; Röll, Hans-Joachim (1999). German U-boat commanders of World War II : a biographical dictionary. Translated by Brooks, Geoffrey. London, Annapolis, Md: Greenhill Books, Naval Institute Press. ISBN 1-55750-186-6.
- Busch, Rainer; Röll, Hans-Joachim (1999). Deutsche U-Boot-Verluste von September 1939 bis Mai 1945 [German U-boat losses from September 1939 to May 1945]. Der U-Boot-Krieg (in German). Vol. IV. Hamburg, Berlin, Bonn: Mittler. ISBN 3-8132-0514-2.
- Gröner, Erich; Jung, Dieter; Maass, Martin (1991). German Warships 1815–1945, U-boats and Mine Warfare Vessels. Vol. 2. Translated by Thomas, Keith; Magowan, Rachel. London: Conway Maritime Press. ISBN 0-85177-593-4.
- Hirschfeld, Wolfgang (1991). Feindfahrten. Logbuch eines U-Bootfunkers (in German). Munchen: Heyne. ISBN 3-453-02051-0.
- Kemp, Paul (1999). U-Boats Destroyed - German Submarine Losses in the World Wars. London: Arms & Armour. ISBN 1-85409-515-3.
- Rohwer, J.; Hummelchen, G. (1992). Chronology of the War at Sea 1939–1945. Naval Institute Press. ISBN 1-55750-105-X.
