= Convoy HX 126 =

Convoy during naval battles of the Second World War

Convoy HX.126
- Part of World War II
Date	10–-28 May 1941
Location	North Atlantic Ocean
Result	German victory

Belligerents
(Nazi Germany) Germany	United Kingdom

Commanders and leaders
Admiral Karl Dönitz	Rear-Admiral F B Watson

Strength
9 U-boats	33 merchant ships 22 escorts (1 during attacks)

Casualties and losses
	9 merchant ships sunk

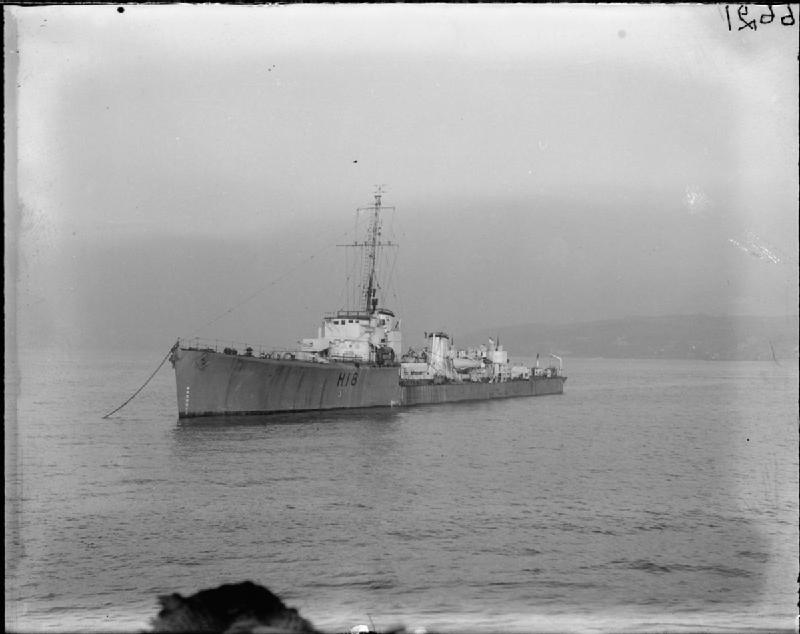
HMS Sabre, part of Convoy HX 126, at a buoy

Convoy HX 126 was the 126th of the numbered series of World War II HX convoys of merchant ships from HalifaX to Liverpool.

== Prelude ==
The ships departed Halifax on 10 May 1941. At this time, there were no escorts to provide protection against U-boats for the whole duration of the journey across the North Atlantic. For the first leg of the crossing, the only escort was the armed merchant cruiser HMS Aurania which task was to provide protection against merchant raiders.

On the U-boat side, the submarines were reorganized in the group West after the attack on convoy OB 318 and were sent to scout for convoys ever more westward.

== Action ==
On 19 May, the U-boat U-94 found the convoy and she directed the other boats of the group West. The group began their attacks on 20 May. The first attack of U-94 in the early morning misses, but in a second attack she sank one or two ships. Then contact with the convoy is lost. The next U-boat, U-556 found the convoy at noon. In two attacks U-556 sank three ships. As the convoy was still unescorted at the time, it started to break up.

U-111 discovered the large 13,000-ton tanker San Felix and damaged it with a torpedo, but the tanker did not belong to HX 126. It was an outbound vessel from the dispersed convoy OB 322. In the evening U-98 sank the freighter Rothermere. Around the same time U-94 regained contact with the convoy and sank the tanker John P. Pedersen. Just before midnight, U-109 sank the straggler Harpagus with two torpedoes. Harpagus had fallen behind to rescue survivors from Norman Monarch. The 12th escort group, which comprised at the time five destroyers, four corvettes and two anti-submarine trawlers, arrived and started to round up the dispersed ships and reform the convoy. Five of the escorts find U-109 and damage the submarine with depth charges. As a result U-109 aborted to France.

In the early morning of 21 May, U-93 struck the tanker Elusa which was later scuttled. U-74 was damaged and forced to abort to France by depth charge attacks from the corvette HMS Verbena and a destroyer (either HMS Churchill or HMS Burnham). Upon learning that a strong escort has arrived, German command disengaged the U-boats and reformed them in a new patrol line further south. Only U-111 is left in place in order to transmit decoy radio signals. On 22 May U-111 found and sank Barnby which either straggled or romped from the convoy.

== Ships in the convoy ==
=== Allied merchant ships ===
A total of 33 merchant vessels joined the convoy, either in Halifax or later in the voyage. Surviving ships reached Liverpool on 28 May.

Name	Flag	Tonnage (GRT)	Notes
Athelprincess (1929)	United Kingdom	8,882	
Barnby (1940)	United Kingdom	4,813	Straggled and sunk by U-111
Baron Carnegie (1925)	United Kingdom	3,178	
Baron Elgin (1933)	United Kingdom	3,942	
Bente Maersk (1928)	United Kingdom	5,722	
British Freedom (1928)	United Kingdom	6,985	Straggled 20 May
British Security (1937)	United Kingdom	8,470	Sunk by U-556
British Splendour (1931)	United Kingdom	7,138	
Cockaponset (1919)	United Kingdom	5,995	Sunk By U-556
Darlington Court (1936)	United Kingdom	4,974	Sunk By U-556
Dorelian (1923)	United Kingdom	6,431	
Eemland (1906)	Netherlands	4,188	Straggled 20 May
Elusa (1936)	Netherlands	6,235	Sunk By U-93
Empire Kudu (1919)	United Kingdom	6,622	
Gretavale (1928)	United Kingdom	4,586	
Hada County (1921)	Norway	4,853	
Harpagus (1940)	United Kingdom	5,173	Sunk By U-109. Rescue Ship
Havsten (1930)	Norway	6,161	
Hindustan (1940)	United Kingdom	5,245	Rear-Admiral F B Watson DSO (Commodore)
John P Pedersen (1930)	Norway	6,128	Sunk By U-94
Karabagh (1932)	United Kingdom	6,427	
Morgenen (1930)	Norway	7,093	
Nicoya (1929)	United Kingdom	5,364	
Norman Monarch (1937)	United Kingdom	4,718	Sunk By U-94
Regent Panther (1937)	United Kingdom	9,556	
Ribera (1940)	United Kingdom	5,559	Straggled 20 May
Rosewood (1931)	United Kingdom	5,989	Iceland
Rothermere (1938)	United Kingdom	5,356	Sunk By U-98
Salando (1920)	Netherlands	5,272	Returned
Tongariro (1925)	United Kingdom	8,720	
Toward (1923)	United Kingdom	1,571	Rescue Ship
Westport (1918)	United Kingdom	5,665	Joined Ex Convoy SC 31
Winona County (1919)	United Kingdom	6,159	Returned

=== Convoy escorts ===
A series of armed military ships escorted the convoy at various times during its journey. Only one escort was present during the German attacks.

Name	Flag	Type	Joined	Left
HMS Arabis (K73)	Royal Navy	Flower-class corvette	21 May 1941	23 May 1941
HMS Artifex (F28)	Royal Navy	Armed merchant cruiser	10 May 1941	21 May 1941
HMS Burnham (H82)	Royal Navy	Town-class destroyer	21 May 1941	22 May 1941
HMS Burwell (H94)	Royal Navy	Town-class destroyer	21 May 1941	26 May 1941
HMCS Chambly (K116)	Royal Canadian Navy	Flower-class corvette	n/a	n/a
HMS Dianella (K07)	Royal Navy	Flower-class corvette	23 May 1941	23 May 1941
HMS Gladiolus (K34)	Royal Navy	Flower-class corvette	23 May 1941	26 May 1941
HMS Heliotrope (K03)	Royal Navy	Flower-class corvette	21 May 1941	23 May 1941
HMS Keppel (D84)	Royal Navy	Shakespeare-class destroyer leader	23 May 1941	26 May 1941
HMS Kingcup (K33)	Royal Navy	Flower-class corvette	23 May 1941	28 May 1941
HMT Lady Elsa	Royal Navy	ASW (Anti-Submarine Warfare) trawler	23 May 1941	23 May 1941
HMS Malcolm (D19)	Royal Navy	Scott-class destroyer leader	20 May 1941	22 May 1941
HMS Mallow (K81)	Royal Navy	Flower-class corvette	21 May 1941	23 May 1941
HMT Northern Gem	Royal Navy	ASW trawler	n/a	n/a
HMT Northern Wave	Royal Navy	ASW trawler	n/a	n/a
HMCS Orillia (K119)	Royal Canadian Navy	Flower-class corvette	n/a	n/a
HMS Sabre (1918)	Royal Navy	Admiralty S-class destroyer	23 May 1941	27 May 1941
HMS Scimitar (H21)	Royal Navy	Admiralty S-class destroyer	22 May 1941	24 May 1941
HMS Springbank	Royal Navy	Seaplane tender/prototype fighter catapult ship	23 May 1941	23 May 1941
HMS Tribune (N76)	Royal Navy	T-class submarine	10 May 1941	10 May 1941
HMS Venomous (D75)	Royal Navy	Modified W-class destroyer	26 May 1941	28 May 1941
HMS Verbena (K85)	Royal Navy	Flower-class corvette	21 May 1941	23 May 1941

== Bibliography ==
- Hague, Arnold (2000). The Allied Convoy System 1939–1945. ISBN 1-86176-147-3.
- Rohwer, J.; Hummelchen, G. (1992). Chronology of the War at Sea 1939–1945. Naval Institute Press. ISBN 1-55750-105-X.
- Blair, Clay (2000). Hitler's U-Boat War [Volume 1 ]: The Hunters. Cassell. ISBN 0-304-35260-8.
