= German submarine U-67 (1940) =

German World War II submarine

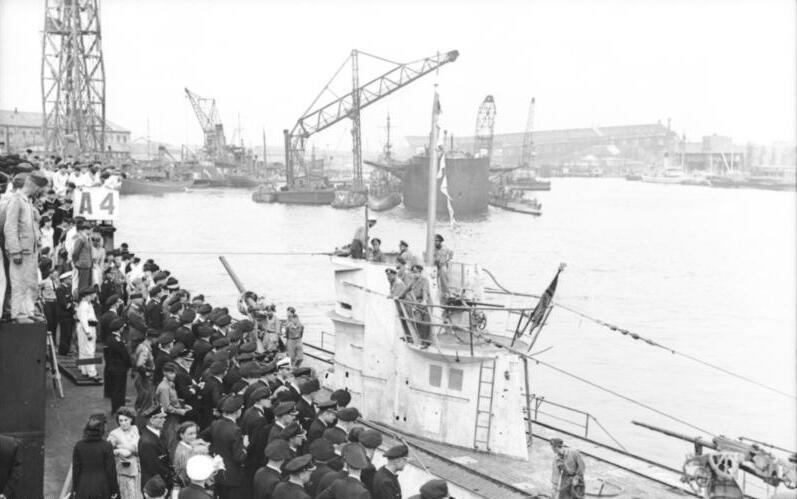
- U-67 entering port

History

Nazi Germany
- Name: U-67
- Ordered: 7 August 1939
- Builder: DeSchiMAG AG Weser, Bremen
- Yard number: 986
- Laid down: 5 April 1940
- Launched: 30 October 1940
- Commissioned: 22 January 1941
- Fate: Sunk 16 July 1943 in the Sargasso Sea

General characteristics
- Class & type: Type IXC submarine
- Displacement: 1,120 t (1,100 long tons) surfaced; 1,232 t (1,213 long tons) submerged
- Length: 76.76 m (251 ft 10 in) o/a; 58.75 m (192 ft 9 in) pressure hull
- Beam: 6.76 m (22 ft 2 in) o/a; 4.40 m (14 ft 5 in) pressure hull
- Height: 9.60 m (31 ft 6 in)
- Draught: 4.70 m (15 ft 5 in)
- Installed power: 4,400 PS (3,200 kW; 4,300 bhp) (diesels); 1,000 PS (740 kW; 990 shp) (electric)
- Propulsion: 2 shafts; 2 × diesel engines; 2 × electric motors
- Speed: 18.3 knots (33.9 km/h; 21.1 mph) surfaced; 7.3 knots (13.5 km/h; 8.4 mph) submerged
- Range: 13,450 nmi (24,910 km; 15,480 mi) at 10 knots (19 km/h; 12 mph) surfaced; 64 nmi (119 km; 74 mi) at 4 knots (7.4 km/h; 4.6 mph) submerged
- Test depth: 230 m (750 ft)
- Complement: 4 officers, 44 enlisted48 to 56
- Armament: 6 × torpedo tubes (4 bow, 2 stern); 22 × 53.3 cm (21 in) torpedoes; 1 × 10.5 cm (4.1 in) SK C/32 deck gun (180 rounds); 1 × 3.7 cm (1.5 in) SK C/30 AA gun; 1 × twin 2 cm FlaK 30 AA guns

Service record
- Part of: 2nd U-boat Flotilla; 22 January 1941 – 16 July 1943
- Identification codes: M 26 049
- Commanders: Kptlt. Heinrich Bleichrodt; 22 January – 4 June 1941; Oblt.z.S. Günther Pfeffer; 5 June – 2 July 1941; K.Kapt. Günther Müller-Stöckheim; 3 July 1941 – 16 July 1943
- Operations: 7 patrols: 1st patrol: 14 September – 16 October 1941; 2nd patrol: 26 November – 26 December 1941; 3rd patrol: 19 January – 30 March 1942; 4th patrol: 20 May – 8 August 1942; 5th patrol: 16 September – 21 December 1942; 6th patrol: 3 March – 13 April 1943; 7th patrol: 10 May – 16 July 1943
- Victories: 13 merchant ships sunk (72,138 GRT); 5 merchant ships damaged (29,726 GRT)

German submarine U-67 was a Type IXC U-boat of Nazi Germany's Kriegsmarine that operated in World War II. She was laid down in the AG Weser yard in Bremen as yard number 986 on 5 April 1940. She was launched on 30 October and was commissioned on 22 January 1941 under Korvettenkapitän Heinrich Bleichrodt.

Her service life began with training with the 2nd U-boat Flotilla on her commissioning date; the boat was declared operational with the same flotilla on 1 September 1941.

== Design ==
German Type IXC submarines were slightly larger than the original Type IXBs. U-67 had a displacement of 1,120 tonnes (1,100 long tons) when at the surface and 1,232 tonnes (1,213 long tons) while submerged. The U-boat had a total length of 76.76 m (251 ft 10 in), a pressure hull length of 58.75 m (192 ft 9 in), a beam of 6.76 m (22 ft 2 in), a height of 9.60 m (31 ft 6 in), and a draught of 4.70 m (15 ft 5 in). The submarine was powered by two MAN M 9 V 40/46 supercharged four-stroke, nine-cylinder diesel engines producing a total of 4,400 metric horsepower (3,240 kW; 4,340 shp) for use while surfaced, two Siemens-Schuckert 2 GU 345/34 double-acting electric motors producing a total of 1,000 metric horsepower (740 kW; 990 shp) for use while submerged. She had two shafts and two 1.92 m (6 ft) propellers. The boat was capable of operating at depths of up to 230 metres (750 ft).

The submarine had a maximum surface speed of 18.3 knots (33.9 km/h; 21.1 mph) and a maximum submerged speed of 7.3 knots (13.5 km/h; 8.4 mph). When submerged, the boat could operate for 63 nautical miles (117 km; 72 mi) at 4 knots (7.4 km/h; 4.6 mph); when surfaced, she could travel 13,450 nautical miles (24,910 km; 15,480 mi) at 10 knots (19 km/h; 12 mph). U-67 was fitted with six 53.3 cm (21 in) torpedo tubes (four fitted at the bow and two at the stern), 22 torpedoes, one 10.5 cm (4.13 in) SK C/32 naval gun, 180 rounds, and a 3.7 cm (1.5 in) SK C/30 as well as a 2 cm (0.79 in) C/30 anti-aircraft gun. The boat had a complement of forty-eight.

== Service history ==
The boat carried out seven patrols in which she sank 13 ships for a total of 72,138 GRT and damaged another five for a total of 29,726 GRT. She was a member of three wolfpacks.

She was sunk on 16 July 1943 by an Avenger bomber from the US aircraft carrier USS Core. 48 men died, there were three survivors.

Her operational service commenced with a trip from Bergen in Norway to Lorient in France. The submarine was to spend the rest of her career being based in the French port.

=== First, second and third patrols ===
She sank St. Clair II west northwest of the Canary Islands on 24 September 1941 on her first foray. On 28 September she was damaged in an action in Tarrafal Bay, Cape Verde islands, colliding with HMS Clyde, which forced her to return to base.

On her second patrol she was attacked by the British corvette Bluebell on 11 December 1941 west of Gibraltar; slight damage was incurred. U-208 was originally thought to have been sunk.

Her third effort, which began with the U-boat's departure from Lorient on 19 January 1942, took her to the Caribbean, where she sank Penelope, about 150 nmi (280 km; 170 mi) west of Dominica on 14 March.

=== Fourth, fifth and sixth patrols and loss ===
Her fourth patrol, as part of Operation Drumbeat, saw the submarine enter the Gulf of Mexico. There she sank eight ships, most of them just off the mouth of the Mississippi River.

Her fifth sortie turned out to be her longest - 97 days. Moving to the area off the north coast of South America, she sank a further six ships, but her success was marred by an explosion while handling torpedoes. One man was killed.

Patrol number six included being part of wolfpack Seeräuber ("Pirate") which was unfortunate as the boat was badly damaged in an attack on the convoy RS 3. Three U-boats (from a total of eight) were hit in the battle, which took place south of the Canary Islands.

The submarine began her seventh and final patrol on 10 May 1943. On 16 July, U-67 was spotted by a Grumman TBF Avenger, piloted by Lt. Robert Pershing Williams of VC-13 embarked in USS Core, who attacked with four Mk.7 depth charges, sinking the boat. An escort, USS McCormick, was dispatched to the scene and picked up three survivors out of a crew of 51 in position 30°05′N 44°17′W.

=== Wolfpacks ===
U-67 took part in three wolfpacks, namely:

- Seeräuber (14 – 23 December 1941)
- Wohlgemut (12 – 22 March 1943)
- Seeräuber (25 – 30 March 1943)

== Summary of raiding history ==
Date	Name	Nationality	Tonnage (GRT)	Fate
24 September 1941	St Clair	United Kingdom	3,753	Sunk
16 February 1942	Rafaela	Netherlands	3,177	Damaged
21 February 1942	Kongsgaard	Norway	9,467	Sunk
14 March 1942	Penelope	Panama	8,436	Sunk
16 June 1942	Managua	Netherlands	2,220	Sunk
20 June 1942	Nortind	Norway	8,221	Damaged
23 June 1942	Raleigh Warner	United States	3,664	Sunk
29 June 1942	Empire Mica	United Kingdom	8,032	Sunk
6 July 1942	Bayard	Norway	2,160	Sunk
7 July 1942	Paul H. Harwood	United States	6,610	Damaged
10 July 1942	Benjamin Brewster	United States	5,950	Sunk
13 July 1942	R. W. Gallagher	United States	7,989	Sunk
25 October 1942	Primero	Norway	4,414	Sunk
8 November 1942	Capo Olmo	United Kingdom	4,712	Damaged
9 November 1942	Nidarland	Norway	6,132	Sunk
15 November 1942	King Arthur	United Kingdom	5,224	Sunk
18 November 1942	Tortugas	Norway	4,697	Sunk
28 November 1942	Empire Glade	United Kingdom	7,006	Damaged

== Bibliography ==
- Busch, Rainer; Röll, Hans-Joachim (1999). German U-boat commanders of World War II: a biographical dictionary. Translated by Brooks, Geoffrey. London, Annapolis, Md: Greenhill Books, Naval Institute Press. ISBN 1-55750-186-6.
- Busch, Rainer; Röll, Hans-Joachim (1999). Der U-Boot-Krieg, 1939-1945: Deutsche U-Boot-Verluste von September 1939 bis Mai 1945 [German U-boat losses from September 1939 to May 1945] (in German). Vol. IV. Hamburg, Berlin, Bonn: Mittler. ISBN 3-8132-0514-2.
- Gröner, Eric; Jung, Dieter; Maass, Martin (1991). German Warships 1815-1945: U-boats and Mine Warfare Vessels. Vol. 2. Translated by Thomas, Keith; Magowan, Rachel. London: Conway Maritime. ISBN 0-85177-593-4.
