= Daniel Lionel Hanington (Royal Canadian Navy officer) =

Canadian Navy admiral (1921–1999)

- Born: July 10, 1921; London, England
- Died: January 6, 1999 (aged 77); Victoria, British Columbia
- Military career
- Allegiance: Canada
- Branch: Royal Canadian Navy; Royal Canadian Navy
- Service years: 1940s–1980s
- Rank: Rear-Admiral
- Commands: HMCS Iroquois
- Conflicts: Battle of the Atlantic
- Awards: DSC, CD

Rear-Admiral Daniel Lionel Hanington, DSC, CD (July 10, 1921 – January 6, 1999) was a Canadian Rear Admiral. In 1942, while serving on HMCS Wetaskiwin, he was awarded the Distinguished Service Cross. His medal citation was "For meritorious services before the enemy."

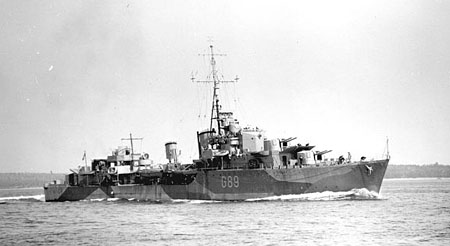
HMCS Iroquois, commanded by Daniel Hanington from 1955 to 1957

What follows is his obituary as published in the National Post.

"Rear Admiral Daniel Lionel Hanington, who survived a torpedo attack by a German U-boat during the Battle of the Atlantic, and received the Distinguished Service Cross, has died aged 77.

"Like many young men of his generation, Mr. Hanington entered the armed forces immediately after completing secondary studies at Rothesay Collegiate School, in New Brunswick.

"In June, 1940, he finished school; by the fall, Midshipman Hanington was at sea in HMS Rajputana, an old ocean liner dragooned into convoy escort duty; and in the early morning of Sunday, April 13, 1941, Rajputana was torpedoed and sunk.

"'All of a sudden, there was a phenomenal crash on the port side. The ship, and everything in her, stopped dead, and she listed about 10 degrees,' Mr. Hanington wrote in his unpublished memoirs. After sighting the U-boat's periscope, and shooting at it unsuccessfully, the submarine fired a second torpedo. Standing on top of a magazine with 20 tons of ammunition, Mr. Hanington was scared. 'If they ever salvage the Raj, I guarantee that they will find my handprints on the rail around that magazine hatch.'

"Forty-two of the crew died; the survivors escaped in lifeboats. 'We turned the boats in the general direction of Iceland, and started rowing. The weather was rapidly deteriorating; it wasn't so bad for us who were rowing, but the injured who had been picked out of the water were rapidly freezing solid and we had to give them much of our warm clothing.' Eventually rescued, Mr. Hanington's good humour and self-depreciating wit - 'he never took himself too seriously,' Brian, his son, said — were clear in the cable he sent home from Reykjavik: 'Sunk, saturated, saved. Love Dan.'

"'Anyway, the whole experience taught me three things—to inhale cigarettes, to enjoy brandy, and that the 13th, on which I was a survivor, is my lucky day. A final note, about nerves—the day before the sinking I weighed 197 pounds, the day after - 168! I had shivered off 29 pounds in about 20 hours. It stayed off for a long while, but I can't really recommend periodic sinking as a way to lose weight,' he wrote.

"He soon returned to sea duty, serving on a series of corvettes and destroyers, slowly being promoted, and developing a celebrated talent for navigation.

"In 1942, serving on HMCS Wetaskiwin as Group Navigator, he was involved in the sinking of U-588. 'I was able to figure out where the U-boat was when we lost contact with him. Partially, because of this, he was sunk. The Canadian Navy, which was 92% made up of ignoramuses like me, hadn't been having a great deal of practical success, so there was high excitement and medals all round. Which is how I came by the Distinguished Service Cross.'

"He said the rest of his career was not as exciting. But it was full of honour and promotions, as he became steadily more expert in navigation, and in the theory and practice of escorting convoys. He served on an aircraft carrier, was hydrographer on HMCS Swansea's Arctic cruise in 1949, did early work with military computers, was part of a team at the Massachusetts Institute of Technology planning the air defence of North America, held commands afloat and ashore, and ended his professional career as Deputy Chief of Staff (Support) for NATO's naval command.

"He later taught at a U.S. Navy school, wrote a manual for the U.S. Navy, worked on Trident, a Canadian naval newspaper in Halifax, and retired to Victoria in 1989, where he was buried Monday among naval officers and admirers from virtually every province, as well as Hawaii and Washington.

"Rear Admiral Hanington was born in London, although both his parents were from New Brunswick. He moved to Trinidad, where his father managed The Guardian newspaper, and was sent to live with relatives in New Brunswick upon his father's death. He married his wife, Margot, during the war, and raised two daughters and two sons.

"In his own words, 'I am not one of your forceful Haningtons, I am one of your stubborn Haningtons. I have brains enough, but have concentrated on my own field, the navy, to the detriment of a broader education. I try to make myself look as good as possible even when I am clearly wrong, so I say that I am kind, and I have tried to be a good father and grandfather. And husband, come to that. I have been fortunate beyond my deserts.'"
