= German submarine U-374 =

German World War II submarine

History

Nazi Germany
- Name: U-374
- Ordered: 23 September 1939
- Builder: Howaldtswerke, Kiel
- Yard number: 5
- Laid down: 18 December 1939
- Launched: 10 May 1941
- Commissioned: 21 June 1941
- Fate: Sunk on 12 January 1942

General characteristics
- Class & type: Type VIIC submarine
- Displacement: 769 tonnes (757 long tons) surfaced; 871 t (857 long tons) submerged
- Length: 67.10 m (220 ft 2 in) o/a; 50.50 m (165 ft 8 in) pressure hull
- Beam: 6.20 m (20 ft 4 in) o/a; 4.70 m (15 ft 5 in) pressure hull
- Height: 9.60 m (31 ft 6 in)
- Draught: 4.74 m (15 ft 7 in)
- Installed power: 2,800–3,200 PS (2,100–2,400 kW; 2,800–3,200 bhp) (diesels); 750 PS (550 kW; 740 shp) (electric)
- Propulsion: 2 shafts; 2 × diesel engines; 2 × electric motors
- Speed: 17.7 knots (32.8 km/h; 20.4 mph) surfaced; 7.6 knots (14.1 km/h; 8.7 mph) submerged
- Range: 8,500 nmi (15,700 km; 9,800 mi) at 10 knots (19 km/h; 12 mph) surfaced; 80 nmi (150 km; 92 mi) at 4 knots (7.4 km/h; 4.6 mph) submerged
- Test depth: 230 m (750 ft); Crush depth: 250–295 m (820–968 ft)
- Complement: 4 officers, 40–56 enlisted
- Armament: 5 × 53.3 cm (21 in) torpedo tubes (four bow, one stern); 14 × torpedoes; 1 × 8.8 cm (3.46 in) deck gun (220 rounds); 1 x 2 cm (0.79 in) C/30 AA gun

Service record
- Part of: 5th U-boat Flotilla; 21 June – 31 August 1941; 1st U-boat Flotilla; 1 September – 13 December 1941; 29th U-boat Flotilla; 14 December 1941 – 12 January 1942
- Identification codes: M 45 441
- Commanders: Oblt.z.S. Unno von Fischel; 21 June 1941 – 12 January 1942
- Operations: 3 patrols: 1st patrol: 29 September – 11 November 1941; 2nd patrol: 6 – 14 December 1941; 3rd patrol: 18 December 1941 – 12 January 1942
- Victories: 1 merchant ship sunk (3,349 GRT); 2 auxiliary warships sunk (992 GRT)

German submarine U-374 was a Type VIIC U-boat of Nazi Germany's Kriegsmarine during World War II. She was ordered on 23 September 1939. Her keel was laid down by Howaldtswerke in Kiel on 18 December 1939, she was launched on 10 May 1941 and formally commissioned into the Kriegsmarine on 21 June 1941 under the command of Oberleutnant zur See Unno von Fischel.

U-374 had a short career, carrying out three patrols. During these she sank one merchant ship, the British Rose Schiaffino and two auxiliary warships, the naval trawler Lady Shirley and naval yacht HMY Rosabelle.

U-374 was sunk on 12 January 1942 in the western Mediterranean east of Cape Spartivento, in position 37°50′N 16°00′E, by torpedoes from the British submarine HMS Unbeaten. 42 of her crew were killed; there was one survivor.

== Design ==
German Type VIIC submarines were preceded by the shorter Type VIIB submarines. U-374 had a displacement of 769 tonnes (757 long tons) when at the surface and 871 tonnes (857 long tons) while submerged. She had a total length of 67.10 m (220 ft 2 in), a pressure hull length of 50.50 m (165 ft 8 in), a beam of 6.20 m (20 ft 4 in), a height of 9.60 m (31 ft 6 in), and a draught of 4.74 m (15 ft 7 in). The submarine was powered by two Germaniawerft F46 four-stroke, six-cylinder supercharged diesel engines producing a total of 2,800 to 3,200 metric horsepower (2,060 to 2,350 kW; 2,760 to 3,160 shp) for use while surfaced, two AEG GU 460/8–27 double-acting electric motors producing a total of 750 metric horsepower (550 kW; 740 shp) for use while submerged. She had two shafts and two 1.23 m (4 ft) propellers. The boat was capable of operating at depths of up to 230 metres (750 ft).

The submarine had a maximum surface speed of 17.7 knots (32.8 km/h; 20.4 mph) and a maximum submerged speed of 7.6 knots (14.1 km/h; 8.7 mph). When submerged, the boat could operate for 80 nautical miles (150 km; 92 mi) at 4 knots (7.4 km/h; 4.6 mph); when surfaced, she could travel 8,500 nautical miles (15,700 km; 9,800 mi) at 10 knots (19 km/h; 12 mph). U-374 was fitted with five 53.3 cm (21 in) torpedo tubes (four fitted at the bow and one at the stern), fourteen torpedoes, one 8.8 cm (3.46 in) SK C/35 naval gun, 220 rounds, and a 2 cm (0.79 in) C/30 anti-aircraft gun. The boat had a complement of between forty-four and sixty.

== Service history ==
=== First patrol ===
29 September 1941 (Kiel) – 11 November 1941 (Brest)

=== Second patrol ===
6 December 1941 (Brest) – 14 December 1941 (La Spezia)

=== Third patrol ===
18 December 1941 (La Spezia) – 12 January 1942 (sunk at 37°50′N 16°00′E)

=== Wolfpacks ===
U-374 took part in one wolfpack, namely:

- Mordbrenner (16 October – 2 November 1941)

== Summary of raiding history ==
Date	Ship Name	Nationality	Tonnage (Note: Merchant ship tonnages are in gross register tons. Military vessels are listed by tons displacement.)	Fate
31 October 1941	Rose Schiaffino	United Kingdom	3,349	Sunk
11 December 1941	HMS Lady Shirley	Royal Navy	477	Sunk
11 December 1941	HMY Rosabelle	Royal Navy	515	Sunk

== Bibliography ==
- Busch, Rainer; Röll, Hans-Joachim (1999). German U-boat commanders of World War II : a biographical dictionary. Translated by Brooks, Geoffrey. London, Annapolis, Md: Greenhill Books, Naval Institute Press. ISBN 1-55750-186-6.
- Busch, Rainer; Röll, Hans-Joachim (1999). Deutsche U-Boot-Verluste von September 1939 bis Mai 1945 [German U-boat losses from September 1939 to May 1945]. Der U-Boot-Krieg (in German). Vol. IV. Hamburg, Berlin, Bonn: Mittler. ISBN 3-8132-0514-2.
- Edwards, Bernard (1996). Dönitz and the Wolf Packs - The U-boats at War. Cassell Military Classics. p. 59. ISBN 0-304-35203-9.
- Gröner, Erich; Jung, Dieter; Maass, Martin (1991). U-boats and Mine Warfare Vessels. German Warships 1815–1945. Vol. 2. Translated by Thomas, Keith; Magowan, Rachel. London: Conway Maritime Press. ISBN 0-85177-593-4.
- Kemp, Paul (1999). U-Boats Destroyed - German Submarine Losses in the World Wars. London: Arms & Armour. ISBN 1-85409-515-3.
