= HMS Boreas (H77) =

1929 British B-class destroyer

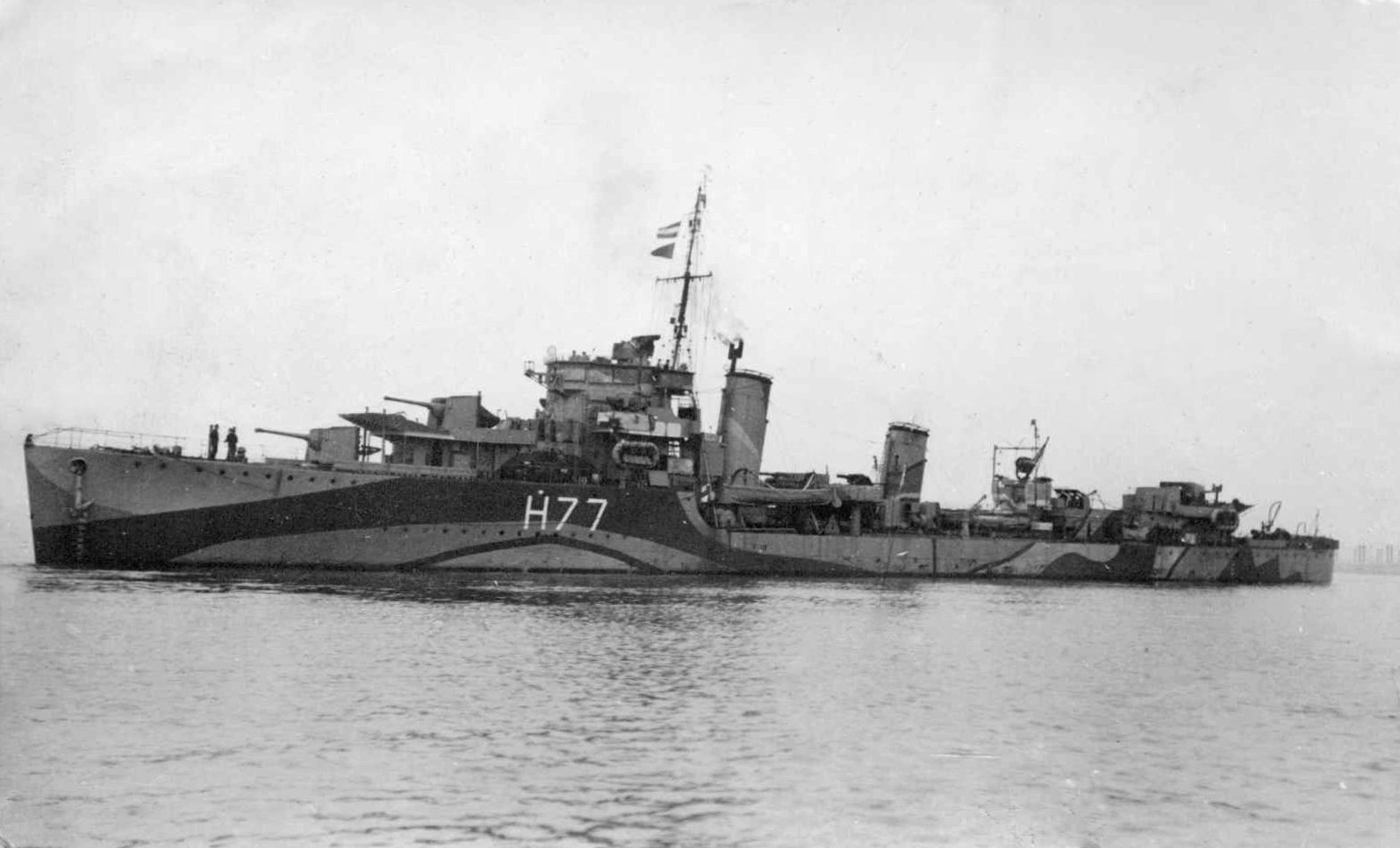
- Boreas at anchor

History

United Kingdom
- Name: Boreas
- Namesake: Boreas
- Ordered: 22 March 1929
- Builder: Palmer's, Jarrow
- Laid down: 22 July 1929
- Launched: 11 June 1930
- Completed: 20 February 1931
- Identification: Pennant number: H77
- Fate: Loaned to the Royal Hellenic Navy, 10 February 1944

Greece
- Name: Salamis
- Namesake: Salamis
- Acquired: 10 February 1944
- Commissioned: 25 March 1944
- Decommissioned: 9 October 1951
- Fate: Returned to the Royal Navy, 9 October 1951; Sold for scrap, 15 April 1952

General characteristics (as built)
- Class & type: B-class destroyer
- Displacement: 1,360 long tons (1,380 t) (standard)
- Length: 323 ft (98.5 m) (o/a)
- Beam: 32 ft 3 in (9.8 m)
- Draught: 12 ft 3 in (3.7 m)
- Installed power: 3 × Admiralty 3-drum boilers; 34,000 shp (25,000 kW)
- Propulsion: 2 × shafts; 2 × geared steam turbines
- Speed: 35 knots (65 km/h; 40 mph)
- Range: 4,800 nmi (8,900 km; 5,500 mi) at 15 knots (28 km/h; 17 mph)
- Complement: 142 (wartime)
- Sensors & processing systems: Type 119 ASDIC
- Armament: 4 × single 4.7 in (120 mm) guns; 2 × single 2 pdr (40 mm) AA guns; 2 × quadruple 21 in (533 mm) torpedo tubes; 20 × depth charges, 1 rail and 2 throwers

HMS Boreas was a B-class destroyer built for the Royal Navy around 1930. Initially assigned to the Mediterranean Fleet, she was transferred to the Home Fleet in 1936. She then patrolled Spanish waters, enforcing the arms blockade during the first year of the Spanish Civil War of 1936–1939. She spent most of World War II on convoy escort duties in the English Channel and the North Atlantic, based at Dover, Gibraltar, and Freetown, Sierra Leone. Boreas also participated in Operation Husky and was later loaned to the Royal Hellenic Navy the next year after conversion into an escort destroyer. She was renamed Salamis and served in the Aegean for the rest of the war. Salamis became a training ship after the war until she was returned to Britain and scrapped in 1952.

== Description ==
The ship displaced 1,360 long tons (1,380 t) at standard load and 1,790 long tons (1,820 t) at deep load. She had an overall length of 323 feet (98.5 m), a beam of 32 feet 3 inches (9.8 m) and a draught of 12 feet 3 inches (3.7 m). She was powered by two Parsons geared steam turbines, driving two shafts, which developed a total of 34,000 shaft horsepower (25,000 kW) and gave a maximum speed of 35 knots (65 km/h; 40 mph). Steam for the turbines was provided by three Admiralty 3-drum boilers. Boreas carried a maximum of 390 long tons (400 t) of fuel oil that gave her a range of 4,800 nautical miles (8,900 km; 5,500 mi) at 15 knots (28 km/h; 17 mph). The ship's complement was 134 officers and ratings, although it increased to 142 during wartime.

The ship mounted four quick-firing (QF) 4.7-inch (120 mm) Mk IX guns in single mounts, designated 'A', 'B', 'X', and 'Y' from bow to stern. There were two forward and two aft, the latter of which were superfiring. For anti-aircraft (AA) defence, Boreas had two 40-millimetre (1.6 in) QF 2-pounder Mk II single-mounted AA guns on a platform between her funnels. She was fitted with two above-water quadruple torpedo tube mounts for 21-inch (533 mm) torpedoes. One depth charge rail and two throwers were fitted; 20 depth charges were originally carried, but this increased to 35 shortly after World War II began in September 1939. The ship was fitted with a Type 119 ASDIC set to detect submarines through sound waves beamed into the water that would reflect off the submarine.

By October 1940, the ship's AA armament had been increased when the rear set of torpedo tubes was replaced by a 3-inch (76.2 mm) (12-pounder) AA gun and 'Y' gun was removed to compensate for the additional depth charges added. Boreas was converted to an escort destroyer in late 1943 with the replacement of the 12-pounder high-angle gun with additional depth charge stowage. The 2-pounder mounts were replaced during the war by 20-millimetre (0.8 in) Oerlikon autocannon. Four additional Oerlikon guns were added in the forward superstructure for a total of six guns.

== Construction and service ==
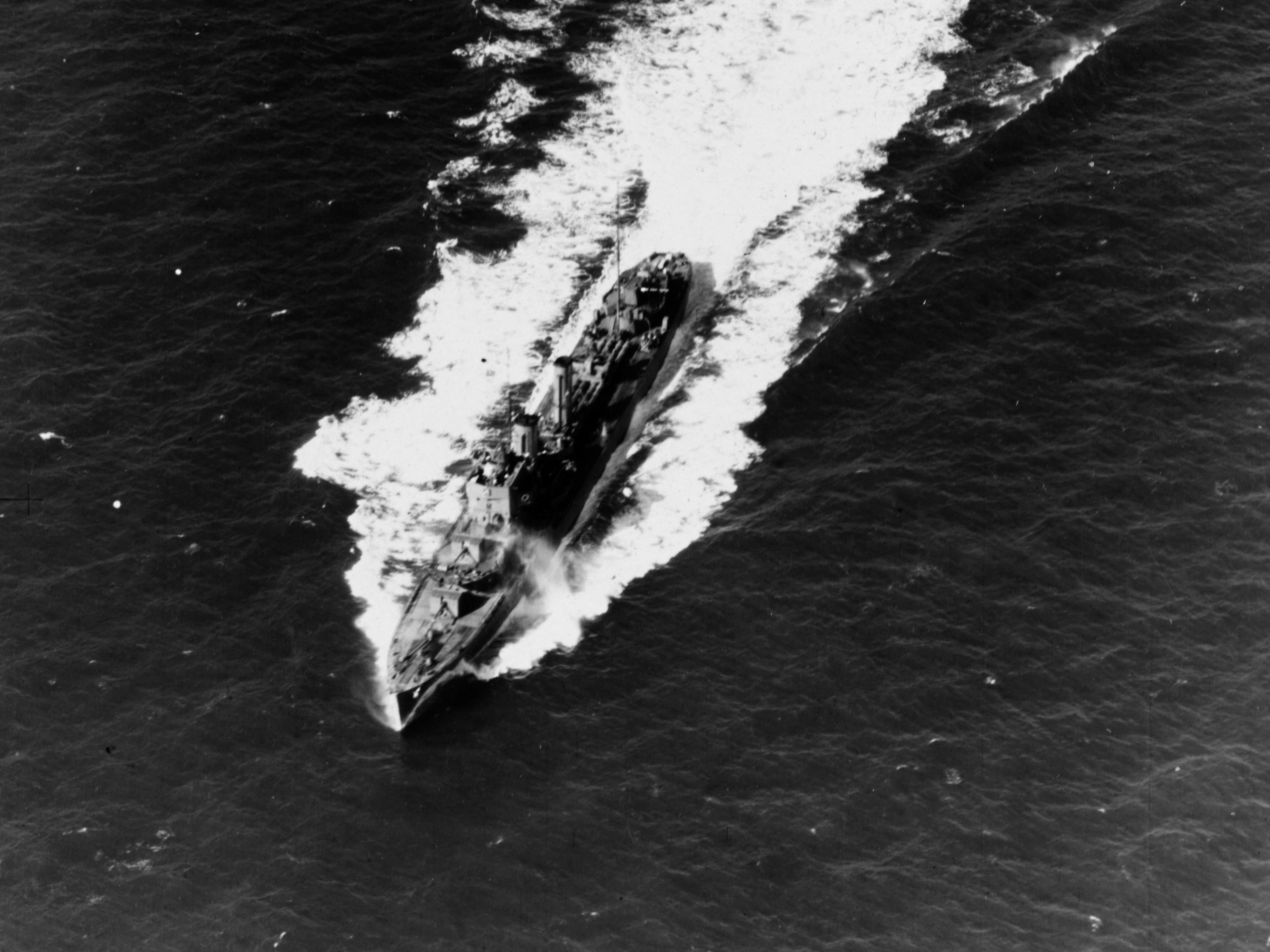
Boreas in the English Channel on 28 September 1939.

The ship was ordered on 22 March 1929 from Palmer's at Jarrow, under the 1928 Naval Programme. She was laid down on 22 July 1929, and launched on 11 June 1930, as the fourth RN ship to carry this name. Boreas was completed on 20 February 1931 at a cost of £221,156, excluding items supplied by the Admiralty such as guns, ammunition and communications equipment. After her commissioning, she was assigned to the 4th Destroyer Flotilla with the Mediterranean Fleet until September 1936 when she was transferred to Home Fleet. Her service in the Mediterranean was uneventful until in July 1936, when Boreas evacuated civilians at the start of the Spanish Civil War.

After a refit at Portsmouth that lasted until 26 September, she conducted multiple patrols off the coast of Spain in 1937 and 1938 as part of the United Kingdom's policy of non-intervention in the Spanish Civil War. On 6 March 1938, she rescued survivors of the torpedoed Baleares, a heavy cruiser belonging to the Spanish Nationalists, off Cartagena, Spain with the destroyer Kempenfelt. Upon her return the following month, the ship began a refit at Portsmouth that lasted until 11 June. Boreas escorted the royal yacht Victoria and Albert during the royal tour of Scotland from 26 July to 4 August. The ship escorted the battleship Revenge and the ocean liner Aquitania in September during the Munich Crisis. She remained with the 4th Destroyer Flotilla until April 1939. Boreas briefly served as a plane guard for the aircraft carriers of the Home Fleet later that year.

In September 1939, during the beginning of World War II, the ship was assigned to the 19th Destroyer Flotilla and spent the first six months on escort and patrol duties in the English Channel and North Sea. While assisting the damaged minesweeper Sphinx on 4 February 1940 in the Moray Firth, Boreas's stern was damaged and she required repairs that lasted until the following month. The ship was attached to the 12th Destroyer Flotilla on 29 March until she was damaged in a collision with her sister ship Brilliant on 15 May. Her repairs lasted until 19 June and Boreas was assigned to the 1st Destroyer Flotilla at Dover upon their completion. On 25 July, the ship engaged German E-boats off Dover Harbour together with Brilliant and was badly damaged by German Junkers Ju 87 Stuka dive bombers after she was ordered to withdraw. Her bridge was hit twice by bombs that killed one officer and twenty crewmen. Boreas was under repair at Millwall Dock until 23 January 1941; she was lightly damaged by German bomb splinters on 19 January. Around 1941, she was fitted with a Type 286 short-range surface search radar.

After working up, the ship was briefly assigned to Western Approaches Command on escort duties before she was transferred to the 18th Destroyer Flotilla at Freetown, Sierra Leone, where she arrived on 28 April. Boreas remained there until she joined Convoy HG 70 on 10 August at Gibraltar. She rescued survivors from four ships and returned them to Gibraltar on 25 August and received a lengthy refit at South Shields from 19 September to 4 January 1942, after which she rejoined the 18th Destroyer Flotilla on 25 January.

Boreas remained on escort duty in the eastern Atlantic until she arrived in Alexandria, Egypt on 11 November after escorting a convoy around the Cape of Good Hope. She was immediately assigned to escort the ships of Operation Stoneage that relieved the siege of Malta. The ship remained in the Mediterranean until January 1943 before she was briefly assigned to the 13th Destroyer Flotilla at Gibraltar. Boreas returned to Freetown in February; she remained there until June when she was transferred to the Mediterranean Fleet to participate in Operation Husky. She was converted into an escort destroyer in Liverpool from September 1943 to February 1944. As part of the conversion, a Type 271 target indication radar was installed above the bridge that replaced her director-control tower and rangefinder and her Type 286 radar was replaced by a Type 290.

=== Greek service ===
The ship was loaned to the Royal Hellenic Navy on 10 February 1944 and recommissioned by them on 25 March as Salamis. She was damaged while working up at Scapa Flow and was under repair at Hull from 28 April to 13 June. Salamis was assigned to escort duty at Gibraltar until October when she was transferred to the Aegean where she served with the 12th (Greek) Destroyer Flotilla for the rest of the war. Salamis was used as a training ship after the war until she was returned to the Royal Navy at Malta on 9 October 1951. She arrived at Rosyth under tow on 15 April 1952 to be broken up by Metal Industries, Limited.

== Bibliography ==
- Colledge, J. J.; Warlow, Ben (2006) [1969]. Ships of the Royal Navy: The Complete Record of All Fighting Ships of the Royal Navy from the 15th Century to the Present (3rd Rev ed.). London: Chatham Publishing. ISBN 978-1-86176-281-8. OCLC 67375475.
- English, John (1993). Amazon to Ivanhoe: British Standard Destroyers of the 1930s. Kendal, UK: World Ship Society. ISBN 0-905617-64-9.
- Friedman, Norman (2009). British Destroyers From Earliest Days to the Second World War. Annapolis, Maryland: Naval Institute Press. ISBN 978-1-59114-081-8.
- Hawkins, Ian (2006). Destroyer: An Anthology of First-hand Accounts of the War at Sea, 1939–1945. London: Conway Maritime. ISBN 978-1-84486-008-1. OCLC 258038058.
- Johnson, David Alan (1998). The Battle of Britain, July-October 1940. Conshohocken, Pennsylvania: Combined Publisher. ISBN 0-938289-88-8.
- Lenton, H. T. (1998). British & Empire Warships of the Second World War. Annapolis, Maryland: Naval Institute Press. ISBN 1-55750-048-7.
- March, Edgar J. (1966). British Destroyers: A History of Development, 1892–1953; Drawn by Admiralty Permission From Official Records & Returns, Ships' Covers & Building Plans. London: Seeley Service. OCLC 164893555.
- Whitley, M. J (1988). Destroyers of World War Two: An International Encyclopedia. Annapolis, Maryland: Naval Institute Press. ISBN 0-87021-326-1.
