= HMS Clyde (N12) =

Submarine of the Royal Navy

- HMS Clyde

History

United Kingdom
- Name: HMS Clyde
- Ordered: 1931
- Builder: Vickers Armstrongs, Barrow
- Launched: 15 March 1934
- Commissioned: 1935
- Decommissioned: July 1945
- Out of service: July 1945
- Identification: Pennant number: N12
- Fate: Sold for scrapping, 30 July 1946
- Badge

General characteristics
- Class & type: River-class submarine
- Displacement: 2,206 tons surfaced; 2,723 tons submerged
- Length: 345 ft (105 m)
- Beam: 28 ft 3 in (8.61 m)
- Draught: 15 ft 11 in (4.85 m)
- Propulsion: 2 shaft diesel electric; 2 supercharged diesels 10,000 hp (7,500 kW) max; 2 electric motors 2,500 hp (1,900 kW)
- Speed: 22 knots (41 km/h; 25 mph) surfaced; 10 knots (19 km/h; 12 mph) submerged
- Complement: 61
- Electronic warfare & decoys: ASDIC
- Armament: 6 × 21 inch (533 mm) torpedo tubes (bow); 1 × 4 in (102 mm) Mk XVI deck gun

HMS Clyde was a submarine of the River class. She was built by Vickers Armstrong, Barrow and launched on 15 March 1934. Building was completed on 12 April 1935. Initially planned to be part of a class 20 strong, Clyde would be the third and final of the boats to be completed and launched.

== Operational history ==
Clyde commissioned in 1935 and the outbreak of the Second World War found her in the Mediterranean Sea with the 1st Submarine Flotilla stationed at Malta.

In September 1939 she was transferred to West Africa, stationed at Freetown, to act as convoy escort guarding against surface raiders. In January 1940 she returned to home waters and was employed on interception patrols in the North Sea. This involved searching for U-boats, surface raiders and blockade runners, and she was active in this capacity during the Norwegian campaign.

On 13 May 1940, while on patrol in Scandinavian waters on the surface, Clyde met the German auxiliary cruiser Widder, resulting in an exchange of gunfire which lasted for over an hour, with no hits for either side. After the engagement, Widder sought shelter in Sandsfjord, Norway. In June of that year, Clyde torpedoed the Gneisenau, hitting her in the bow and forcing her to return to Trondheim for repairs.

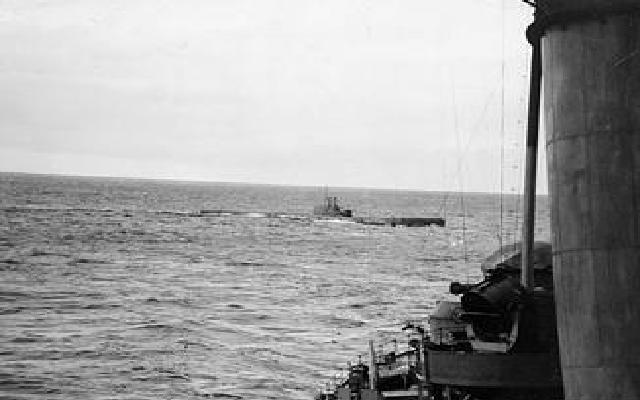
HMS Clyde acting as an escort during refuelling

In July she sank the Norwegian fishing vessel SF 52 and later mistakenly attacked the T-class submarine Truant, but without hitting her.

Following this Clyde took on the same role in the Bay of Biscay, continuing until May 1941, when she was reassigned to Gibraltar with the 8th Submarine Flotilla. During this period she made several patrols in the western Mediterranean, and she also sailed with HG 70 as ocean escort. June 1941 found Clyde operating in the Mediterranean, where she sank the Italian merchant vessels San Marco and Sturla, and later the Italian auxiliary patrol vessel V 125 Giovanni Bottigliere. One of the submarine's battery compartments was converted into a cargo compartment and she made nine trips transporting supplies to Malta. In September 1941, she unsuccessfully attacked three German submarines U-67, U-68 and U-111 during an action in Tarrafal Bay, Cape Verde Islands, although she accidentally collided with U-67 when she dived, leaving the latter vessel badly damaged and obliged to return to base.

During 1942, Clyde continued operations in the Mediterranean, making a series of re-supply mission to Malta. In February she fired two torpedoes at Regent; both thankfully missed. Regent was on her way to Ponta Delgada in the Azores to undergo repairs for storm damage. In January 1943, Clyde returned to the UK for an extensive refit, which saw her out of action for most of the year. After trials and working up, Clyde was assigned in January 1944 to the Eastern Fleet, joining 2nd Submarine Flotilla at Trincomalee in May. There she took part in patrol and fleet operations, making several covert missions landing SOE agents, notably "Operation Hatch" to the Andaman Islands.

In March 1945, she recorded another string of kills against the Japanese, sinking two sailing vessels and the auxiliary submarine chaser Kiku Maru. In May 1945, having completed 36 operational patrols and with a final war total of 6 enemy vessels sunk, Clyde was moved to Mombasa for repairs. These continued until August 1945 and the end of hostilities with Japan, when she moved to the Reserve, paying off her crew in Durban on 19 July 1945.

Having survived the Second World War, Clyde was sold for breaking up on 30 July 1946 to Joubert, of Durban.
