= Klaus Scholtz =

- Born: 22 March 1908; Magdeburg, German Empire
- Died: 1 May 1987 (aged 79); Bad Schwartau, West Germany
- Military career
- Branch: Reichsmarine; Kriegsmarine; German Navy
- Service years: 1927–45; 1953–66
- Rank: Kapitän zur See
- Units: SSS Niobe cruiser Berlin; Schleswig-Holstein
- Commands: Jaguar; U-108; 12th U-boat Flotilla
- Conflicts: World War II: Battle of the Atlantic
- Awards: Knight's Cross of the Iron Cross with Oak Leaves

Klaus Scholtz (22 March 1908 – 1 May 1987) was a commander in the Kriegsmarine (navy) of Nazi Germany during World War II. He commanded the Type IXB U-boat U-108. Scholtz was a recipient of the Knight's Cross of the Iron Cross with Oak Leaves.

== Career ==
Scholtz joined the Reichsmarine in 1927 as member of "Crew 1927" (the incoming class of 1927) and served in torpedo boats, before transferring to the U-boat arm (U-bootwaffe) in April 1940. From October 1940 he commanded U-108, sinking 25 ships on 8 patrols, for a total of 128,190 tons of Allied shipping, including the British armed merchant cruiser Rajputana. In October 1942 Scholtz formed and took command of 12th U-boat Flotilla based at Bordeaux, France.

In August 1944 the approach of Allied troops meant that the base had to be evacuated. The last U-boats escaped by sea, and Scholtz attempted to lead the remaining men (about 220) back to Germany on foot. They left Bordeaux on 26 August, but were captured on 11 September by American forces in Loire. Scholtz spent the next 18 months in US captivity.

Post-war, Scholtz served in the Bundesgrenzschutz-See - the naval arm of the Federal Border Guards - from 1953 to 1956, then transferred to the Bundesmarine, serving as commander of several naval bases, including Kiel, Cuxhaven, and Wilhelmshaven. He retired in 1966 with the rank of Kapitän zur See, and died in 1987.

== Awards ==
- Iron Cross (1939) 2nd and 1st Class
- Knight's Cross of the Iron Cross with Oak Leaves
  - Knight's Cross on 26 December 1941 as Kapitänleutnant and commander of U-108
  - 123rd Oak Leaves on 10 September 1942 as Korvettenkapitän and commander of U-108

Military offices
Preceded by Korvettenkapitän Johannes Woidneck	Commander of the Marinestützpunktkommando Kiel; July 1956 – December 1957	Succeeded by Kapitän zur See Kurt Thoma
Preceded by Kapitän zur See Kurt Thoma	Commander of the Marinestützpunktkommando Kiel; April 1958 – October 1959	Succeeded by Kapitän zur See Werner Wierig
Preceded by Kapitän zur See Hans Cohausz	Commander of the Marinestützpunktkommando Cuxhaven; October 1961 – March 1962	Succeeded by Fregattenkapitän Hans-Ludwig Gaude
