= HMS Lady Shirley =

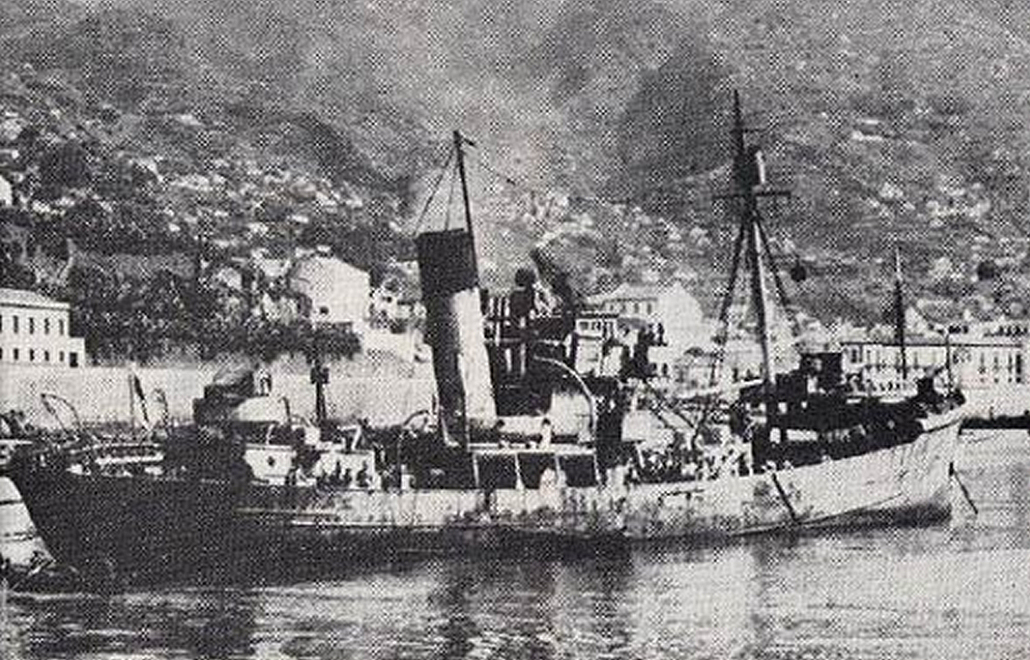
- HMS Lady Shirley (ASW trawler)

History

United Kingdom
- Name: HMS Lady Shirley
- Operator: Royal Navy
- Builder: Cook, Welton & Gemmell Beverley
- Yard number: 615
- Launched: 25 February 1937
- Completed: 19 April 1937
- Acquired: 1940
- Commissioned: February 1941
- Fate: Sunk on 11 December 1941 in the Straits of Gibraltar 35.59N, 05.17W

General characteristics
- Class & type: Anti-submarine trawler
- Displacement: 472 tonnes
- Length: 163.5 ft (49.8 m)
- Beam: 27.2 ft (8.3 m)
- Propulsion: 120 hp (89 kW)
- Speed: 12 knots (22 km/h; 14 mph)
- Complement: 33
- Sensors & processing systems: ASDIC anti-submarine dome
- Armament: Depth charges; 1 × BL 4 inch naval gun Mk VII

HMS Lady Shirley (T464), also known as HMT Lady Shirley, was a fishing trawler requisitioned by the Royal Navy in 1940 and converted for anti-submarine warfare duties. She sank U-111 on 4 October 1941, capturing 44 of her crew. Lady Shirley was sunk herself on 11 December 1941, by a single torpedo from U-374.

== Description ==
Lady Shirley was a fishing trawler of 472 tons displacement based at Hull. She was built at Beverley in the UK by Cook, Welton & Gemmell and launched in 1937. She was 164 feet (50.0 m) long and 27 feet (8.2 m) in the beam. She had a 120 horsepower (89 kW) engine giving a top speed of 12 knots (22 km/h).

== Service record ==
She was pressed into service by the Royal Navy in 1940 and converted into an anti-submarine trawler. Conversion included fitting an ASDIC anti-submarine dome, a 4-inch naval gun and depth charges. She had a complement of 33. Lady Shirley went into service in January 1941 and served with the 31st Anti-Submarine Group based at Gibraltar. She was under the command of Lieutenant-Commander Arthur Henry Callaway.

=== Sinking of U-111 ===
On 4 October 1941, while searching for the damaged Silverbelle, Lady Shirley encountered German submarine U-111 engaged in a similar mission south-west of Tenerife, at position 27°15′N 20°27′W. Mistaking the trawler for the damaged freighter (though Lady Shirley was small, the U-boat skipper thought she was far away) the U-boat was caught at periscope depth when Lady Shirley closed, and was depth charged. Forced to the surface, U-111 was engaged with gunfire until she was abandoned and sunk. Of the U-boat crew of 52, eight were killed, including her commander, Wilhelm Kleinschmidt; 44 survived. Lady Shirley had one crew member killed and several injured in the battle. This was the first time that prisoners of war (POWs) were captured from a U-boat operating in the South Atlantic. German survivors claimed that U-111 was the first U-boat to be lost of those operating in that area.

== Loss ==
On 11 December 1941, a torpedo from U-374 hit Lady Shirley, sinking her in the Straits of Gibraltar at position 35°59′N 5°17′W. All 33 crew were lost with their ship.
