= Type IXB submarine =

WW2 German submarine subclass

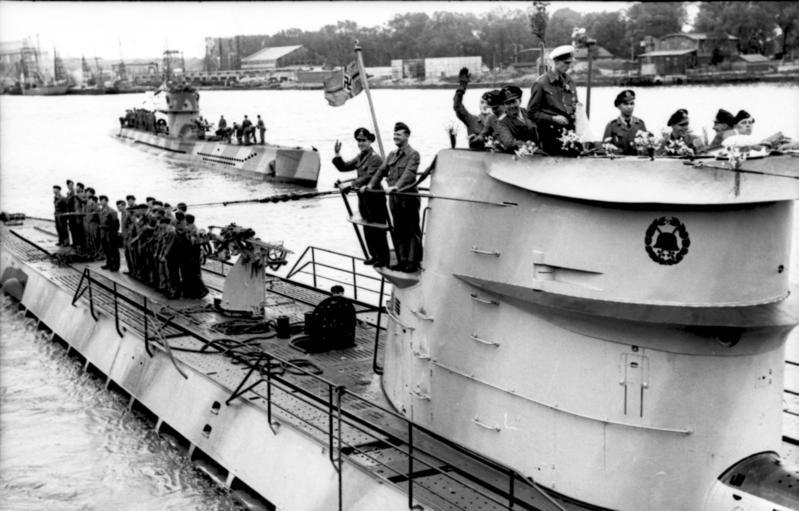
- U-123 and U-201 leaving Lorient on 8 June 1941.

Class overview
- Operators: Kriegsmarine
- Preceded by: Type IXA submarine
- Succeeded by: Type IXC submarine
- Built: 1938–1940
- In service: 1939–1945
- In commission: 1939–1945
- Planned: 14
- Completed: 14
- Lost: 14

General characteristics
- Displacement: 1,051 t (1,034 long tons) surfaced; 1,178 t (1,159 long tons) submerged
- Length: 76.50 m (251 ft 0 in) overall; 58.75 m (192 ft 9 in) pressure hull
- Beam: 6.76 m (22 ft 2 in) overall; 4.40 m (14 ft 5 in) pressure hull
- Height: 9.60 m (31 ft 6 in)
- Draft: 4.70 m (15 ft 5 in)
- Speed: 18.2 knots (33.7 km/h; 20.9 mph) surfaced; 7.3 knots (13.5 km/h; 8.4 mph) submerged
- Range: 12,000 nmi (22,000 km; 14,000 mi) at 10 knots (19 km/h; 12 mph) surfaced; 64 nmi (119 km; 74 mi) at 4 knots (7.4 km/h; 4.6 mph) submerged

The Type IXB submarine was a sub-class of the Type IX submarine built for Nazi Germany's Kriegsmarine between 1938 and 1940. The U-boats themselves were designed to be fairly large ocean-going submarines. The inspiration for the Type IXB submarine came from the earlier original Type IX submarine, the Type IXA submarine. The design was developed to give an increased range, a change which resulted in a slightly heavier overall tonnage. This design was improved even further in the later Type IXC submarines.

The class comprised 14 submarines, U-64, U-65, U-103, U-104, U-105, U-106, U-107, U-108, U-109, U-110, U-111, U-122, U-123, and U-124. Twelve were sunk during the war and two scuttled by their crews at the end of the war. The Type IXB was the most successful class of submarine in the war in terms of average tonnage sunk, with each U-boat sinking an average of over 100,000 gross register tons (GRT) during its career.

== Design and construction ==
=== Construction ===
All Type IXB submarines were ordered by the Nazi Germany's Kriegsmarine between 16 July 1937 and 8 August 1939 as part of the overall German plan of re-armament in violation of the Treaty of Versailles. The design of the IXB submarines came from the initial Type IX submarines, the Type IXA. All contracts for the construction of the submarines were awarded to DeSchiMAG AG Weser, Bremen. The first U-boat to be laid down in the Bremen ship yards was U-65, whose keel was laid down on 6 December 1938. The last U-boat to be laid down was U-111, whose construction began on 20 February 1940. By the end of 1940, all Type IXB submarines had been fully constructed and commissioned into the Kriegsmarine.

=== Design ===
All Type IXB submarines had 1,000 PS (986 shp; 735 kW) while submerged and 4,400 PS (4,340 shp; 3,236 kW) when surfaced. As a result, they could travel at 18.2 knots (33.7 km/h; 20.9 mph) while surfaced and 7.3 knots (13.5 km/h; 8.4 mph) submerged. The Type IXB submarines had a range of 12,000 nmi (22,000 km; 14,000 mi) at 10 knots (19 km/h; 12 mph) while on the surface and 64 nmi (119 km; 74 mi) at 4 knots (7.4 km/h; 4.6 mph) while submerged. They had 6 torpedo tubes (4 in the bow, 2 in the stern) and carried a total of 22 53.3 cm (21 in) torpedoes. Unlike the earlier Type IXAs, the Type IXB submarines were equipped with 44 TMA mines as well. The Type IXB submarines were equipped with a 10.5 cm SK C/32 naval gun with 180 rounds on a Utof mount. The last piece of armament that the Type IXB submarines were equipped with were the standard 2 cm (0.79 in) anti-aircraft guns. All Type IXB submarines could hold up to 56 crew members at any given time though that number was usually around 45–48 crew members. After being commissioned and deployed, all of the Type IXB submarines built prior to the fall of France were stationed in the German port city of Wilhelmshaven while those who were commissioned following the capture of numerous French ports during the Battle of France were stationed in Lorient.

== List of Type IXB U-boats ==
The Type IXB class had 14 U-boats, all of which were built by AG Weser of Bremen:

Name	Hull builder	Ordered	Laid down	Launched	Commissioned	Fate
U-64	AG Weser, Bremen	16 July 1937	15 December 1938	20 September 1939	16 December 1939	Sunk on 13 April 1940 in the Herjangsfjord near Narvik, Norway. 8 dead and 38 survivors.
U-65	AG Weser, Bremen	16 July 1937	6 December 1938	6 November 1939	15 February 1940	Sunk on 28 April 1941 in the North Atlantic south-east of Iceland. All hands lost.
U-103	AG Weser, Bremen	24 May 1938	6 September 1939	12 April 1940	5 July 1940	Scuttled on 3 May 1945 at Kiel.
U-104	AG Weser, Bremen	24 May 1938	10 November 1939	25 May 1940	19 August 1940	Sunk around 28 November 1940 by mine off Tory Island in British minefield SN 44.
U-105	AG Weser, Bremen	24 May 1938	16 November 1939	15 June 1940	10 September 1940	Sunk 2 June 1943 near Dakar. All hands lost.
U-106	AG Weser, Bremen	24 May 1938	26 November 1939	17 June 1940	24 September 1940	Sunk on 2 August 1943 north-west of Cape Ortegal, Spain. 22 dead and 36 survivors.
U-107	AG Weser, Bremen	24 May 1938	6 December 1939	2 July 1940	8 October 1940	Sunk on 18 August 1944 by depth charges from British aircraft.
U-108	AG Weser, Bremen	24 May 1938	27 December 1939	15 July 1940	22 October 1940	Sunk on 11 April 1944 at Stettin during a bombing raid. Later raised and scuttled there on 24 April 1945.
U-109	AG Weser, Bremen	24 May 1938	9 March 1940	14 September 1940	5 December 1940	Sunk on 4 May 1943 south of Ireland by depth charges from British aircraft. All hands lost.
U-110	AG Weser, Bremen	24 May 1938	1 February 1940	25 August 1940	21 November 1940	Captured on 9 May 1941 in the North Atlantic south of Iceland by the destroyers HMS Bulldog, Broadway and the British corvette HMS Aubrietia. The Royal Navy allowed the U-boat to sink the next day in order to keep the documents captured from her a secret.
U-111	AG Weser, Bremen	8 August 1939	20 February 1940	15 September 1940	19 December 1940	Sunk on 4 October 1941 south-west of Tenerife by depth charges from a British warship. 8 dead and 44 survivors.
U-122	AG Weser, Bremen	15 December 1937	5 March 1939	20 December 1939	30 March 1940	Went missing on 22 June 1940. All hands presumed lost.
U-123	AG Weser, Bremen	15 December 1937	15 April 1939	2 March 1940	30 May 1940	Scuttled at Lorient on 19 August 1944. Raised and later became the French submarine Blaison.
U-124	AG Weser, Bremen	15 December 1937	11 August 1939	9 March 1940	11 June 1940	Sunk 2 April 1943 west of Porto by depth charges from the British warships HMS Stonecrop and Black Swan. All hands lost.

== See also ==
- German Type IX submarine
- German Type IXA submarine

== Bibliography ==
- Gröner, Erich; Jung, Dieter; Maass, Martin (1991). U-boats and Mine Warfare Vessels. German Warships 1815–1945. Vol. 2. Translated by Thomas, Keith; Magowan, Rachel. London: Conway Maritime Press. ISBN 0-85177-593-4.
