= Wilhelm Kleinschmidt =

Kapitänleutnant Wilhelm-Josef Kleinschmidt (27 January 1907 in Oldenburg (Germany) as Wilhelm-Josef Kleinschmidt, named Josef – 4 October 1941 in the Atlantic Ocean) was captain of U-111 during World War II. He was Married and He was father of 6 Kids and lived With his Family in Duisburg(Germany).

U-111 was sunk on 4 October 1941 by HMS Lady Shirley, a Royal Navy anti-submarine trawler. Kleinschmidt was killed in action at that time.

== Background ==
A native of Duisburg, Kleinschmidt joined the German Navy in 1932 and was given two years seniority on account of having formerly served for seven years in the merchant service.

From 1936–1937 he served on motor torpedo boats. In 1937 he was promoted to Oberleutnant zur See (Lieutenant) and he then commanded a boat of the 1st MTB Flotilla. He later served on the cruiser Königsberg and as torpedo officer on the cruiser Nürnberg.

Kleinschmidt is said to have been promoted to Kapitänleutnant (Lieutenant-Commander) at the outbreak of war. He is believed to have transferred to U-boats sometime in autumn 1940 and to have taken a U-boat course lasting two, or at the most three, months at Pillau. It is thought that he underwent instruction during a war cruise on another U-boat.

He was appointed to captain the U-111 while it was in the final stage of construction.

He is described as having been a cautious U-boat captain who had never before attacked so small a ship as the Lady Shirley.

His petty officers considered him to have been too old for his job.
