= List of shipwrecks in December 1941 =

The list of shipwrecks in December 1941 includes all ships sunk, foundered, grounded, or otherwise lost during December 1941.

== 1 December ==
List of shipwrecks: 1 December 1941
Ship	State	Description
Adriatico	Regia Marina	World War II: The armed merchant cruiser (1,976 GRT) on a passage from Argostoli for Benghazi, was shelled and sunk in the Mediterranean Sea, 65 nautical miles (120 km) north of Benghazi by Force K, Royal Navy.^{[Note 1]} HMS Lively (Royal Navy) rescued 21 survivors, while 66 others were rescued by the destroyer Giovanni da Verrazzano (Regia Marina). There were nine or eleven fatalities depending on sources.
Alvise da Mosto	Regia Marina	World War II: The Navigatori-class destroyer was shelled and sunk in the Mediterranean Sea by HMS Aurora (Royal Navy) with the loss of 138 of her 263 crew.
VT-559 Hilde	Soviet Navy	World War II: The requisitioned 489 GRT coaster, beached on 25 September after being bombed and damaged by Luftwaffe aircraft, was scuttled at Hanko, Finland by retreating Soviet troops.
Iridio Mantovani	Italy	World War II: The 10,540 GRT tanker on a trip from Trapani for Tripoli with a cargo of fuel oil, was bombed, immobilized and set afire by 4 Bristol Blenheim bombers of No. 107 Squadron RAF. She was abandoned by her crew, and later shelled and sunk in the Mediterranean Sea 60 nautical miles (110 km) north-northwest of Tripoli (35°50′N 12°50′E) by HMS Aurora (Royal Navy) with the loss of 49 of her 83 crew.
Python	Kriegsmarine	World War II: The supply ship was intercepted in the South Atlantic (27°53′S 3°55′W) by HMS Dorsetshire (Royal Navy) and was scuttled by her crew without loss of life. A total of 414 survivors were rescued by UA, U-68, U-124, U-129 (all Kriegsmarine), Giuseppe Finzi, Enrico Tazzoli Luigi Torelli, and Pietro Calvi (all Regia Marina).
St. Leonard No.1	United Kingdom	World War II: The 210 GRT fishing trawler was bombed and sunk in the North Sea (60°58′N 1°10′W) by Luftwaffe aircraft. Her ten crew were rescued.
Tasuja	Soviet Union	World War II: The icebreaker was hit by a German bomb that did not detonate until the ship returned to Kronstadt Harbour, sinking her. Thirteen of her crew were killed.

== 2 December ==
List of shipwrecks: 2 December 1941
Ship	State	Description
Astral	United States	World War II: The 7,542 GRT tanker on a trip from Aruba for Lisbon with a cargo of gasoline and kerosene, was torpedoed and sunk in the Atlantic Ocean (35°40′N 24°00′W) by U-43 (Kriegsmarine) with the loss of all 37 crew.
British Captain	United Kingdom	World War II: The 6,968 GRT tanker on a trip from Corpus Christi for Shell Haven with a cargo of fuel oil, struck a mine and sank in the North Sea (52°13′01″N 1°54′14″E) with the loss of one of her 54 crew.
Cavarna	Romania	World War II: The 3,495 GRT cargo ship travelling in a convoy from Varna for Ochakov with a cargo of fuel, struck a Soviet mine and sank in the Black Sea 15 miles (24 km) east of Burgas.
Cordelia	Germany	World War II: The 1,357 GRT cargo ship travelling in a convoy from Varna for Ochakov, struck a Soviet mine and sank in the Black Sea 15 miles (24 km) east of Burgas.
Fjord	Norway	World War II: The 4,032 GRT cargo ship on a trip from Águilas for Barrow with a cargo of iron ore, was torpedoed and sunk in the Mediterranean Sea off Estepona, Spain by U-557 (Kriegsmarine) with the loss of fourteen of her 35 crew.
Grelhead	United Kingdom	World War II: The 4,274 GRT cargo ship on a trip from Melilla for England with a cargo of iron ore, was torpedoed and sunk in the Mediterranean Sea 2 nautical miles (3.7 km) north of Point Negri, Morocco by U-562 (Kriegsmarine) with the loss of 41 of her 43 crew.
DPk 50 Hollandia	Kriegsmarine	World War II: The patrol boat struck a mine and sank in the Baltic Sea off Kolberg.
M 529	Kriegsmarine	World War II: The Type 1916 minesweeper (630 GRT) struck a mine and sank in the Baltic Sea off Kolberg (54°16′N 15°25′E). Ten of her crew were killed.

== 3 December ==
List of shipwrecks: 3 December 1941
Ship	State	Description
F 160	Kriegsmarine	The Type A Marinefährprahm was damaged by heavy seas between Tripoli and Benghazi, Libya when her bow doors failed and was later scuttled. Her crew were rescued by Perseo (Regia Marina).
I-17	Soviet Navy	The tug foundered in the Gulf of Finland. Her crew were rescued by the destroyer Svirepy (Soviet Navy).
Kuha 3	Finnish Navy	World War II: Continuation War: The minesweeper struck a mine and sank in Björkösund. She was later salvaged, repaired and returned to service.
Maclaren	United Kingdom	World War II: The cargo ship struck a mine and sank in the Bristol Channel south of Cardiff, Glamorgan (51°21′21″N 3°17′17″W) with the loss of three of her 31 crew. The wreck was dispersed by explosives between 1 July and 31 December 1943.
OR-9	Soviet Navy	The KM-4-class patrol boat (12 tons ) was either scuttled at Hanko on 29 November, or foundered in the Gulf of Finland during evacuation. Her crew were rescued.
OR-10	Soviet Navy	The KM-4-class patrol boat (12 tons ) hit a mine and sank off Hogland during evacuation of Hanko Naval Base.
Sagadahoc	United States	World War II: The cargo ship was torpedoed and sunk in the Atlantic Ocean (21°20′S 7°50′W) by U-124 (Kriegsmarine) with the loss of one of her 35 crew.
SF 29	Kriegsmarine	The Siebel ferry was wrecked on this date.
UJ-1708 Färöer	Kriegsmarine	World War II: The 470 GRT submarine chaser, a converted fishing trawler, was shelled and sunk off Rolvsøy by K-3 (Soviet Navy) with the loss of all hands, between 48 and 56 men.
Virsaitis	Soviet Navy	World War II: The Virsaitis-class minesweeper struck a mine and sank in the Gulf of Finland off Hanko, Finland. Seventy crewmen and 150 troops were rescued, but 130 troops were killed.
VT-521 Iosif Stalin	Soviet Navy	Iosif Stalin. World War II: Continuation War: The requisitioned 7,645 GRT troopship evacuating 5,589 people from Hanko Naval Base, struck three mines and then was hit by a 305-mm shell from Finnish coastal artillery. Only 1,740 people were rescued, some of them by M-205, M-211, M-215, M-217 (all Soviet Navy) and five Soviet Navy patrol boats. The abandoned ship drifted and eventually ran aground at Lohusalu peninsula where the wreck was still partly above water. About 3,000 men were captured and 841 were killed. VT-521 was raised, towed to Tallinn in July 1945 and scrapped.
PK-112	Soviet Navy	The MO-2-class patrol boat escorting VT-521 Iosif Stalin, was shelled and sunk in error by Slavny.

== 4 December ==
List of shipwrecks: 4 December 1941
Ship	State	Description
Edith Faulbaums	Germany	World War II: The cargo ship struck a mine and sank off Warnemunde.
Eridano	Italy	World War II: The 4,286 GRT cargo ship on a passage from Corfu for Patras, was torpedoed and sunk in the Ionian Sea 6 nautical miles (11 km) west of Capo Dukato by HMS Perseus (Royal Navy). There were four missing and 33 survivors.
Vestri	Norway	World War II: The 499 GRT coaster on a voyage from Stavanger for Oslo was bombed and damaged off the Tungenes Lighthouse, Norway, by Royal Air Force aircraft. She was beached at Vistestranden and burnt out. Four of her crew were killed.

== 5 December ==
List of shipwrecks: 5 December 1941
Ship	State	Description
Aghia Irini	Greece	The coaster on a trip from Agria for Rafina with a cargo of apples, ran into storm and sank due to a displaced cargo off Kalamos with the loss of six of the seven people on board.
HMS Chakdina	Royal Navy	World War II: The 3,033 GRT armed boarding vessel on a voyage from Tobruk for Alexandria with troops and prisoners of war, was torpedoed and sunk in the Mediterranean Sea (31°11′N 24°30′E) by a SM.79 Sparviero torpedo bombers of the 279^{o} Squadriglia Aerosiluranti (Regia Aeronautica) with the loss of around 400 lives among the 600-plus people on board (including 380 wounded and 100 German and Italian prisoners of war). About 200 of the survivors were rescued by HMS Farndale and HMT Thorgrim (both Royal Navy)
Island	Norway	World War II: The 638 GRT coaster on a voyage from Honningsvåg for Tanafjord with a cargo of coal, was torpedoed and sunk in the Barents Sea off Mehamn (71°07′N 27°54′E) by HMS Sealion (Royal Navy).
Kai	Denmark	The 1,746 GRT cargo ship traveling in a convoy from Rotterdam for Aarhus with a cargo of coal, ran aground off Schiermonnikoog in a gale, and subsequently sank. Her nineteen crew were rescued.

== 6 December ==
List of shipwrecks: 6 December 1941
Ship	State	Description
Equator	Finland	The cargo ship ran aground near Luleå, Sweden. She was refloated but consequently sank in the Baltic Sea (65°20′07″N 22°15′00″E). Her crew survived.
Greenland	United Kingdom	World War II: The 1,281 GRT cargo ship on a trip from London for Grangemouth with a cargo of scrap metal, struck a mine and sank in the North Sea (52°14′30″N 1°56′30″E) with the loss of nine of her crew.
Hada County	Norway	World War II: Convoy ON 38: The 4,853 GRT cargo ship on a trip from Milford Haven for St. John with a cargo of coal, ran aground on Brazil Shoal — a reef off Grand Manan, New Brunswick, Canada (44°36.378′N 066°41.261′W) and was wrecked. There were no casualties.
HMS Perseus	Royal Navy	World War II: The Parthian-class submarine struck a mine and sank in the Ionian Sea off Zante Cephalonia, Greece with the loss of 60 of her 61 crew.
Scottish Trader	United Kingdom	World War II: Convoy SC 56: The 4,016 GRT cargo ship on a trip from Philadelphia for Liverpool with general cargo and steel, straggled behind the convoy. She was torpedoed and sunk in the Atlantic Ocean south of Iceland by U-131 (Kriegsmarine) with the loss of all 43 crew.
Shch-204	Soviet Navy	World War II: The Shchuka-class submarine was bombed and sunk in the Black Sea south south east of Varna, Bulgaria (42°53′N 28°03′E) either by Akula patrol plane of 161st Squadron of Bulgarian Air Force or Heinkel He 59 aircraft of Seenotflottille 12 of Luftwaffe with the loss of all 42 crew.
Unnamed	Flag unknown	World War II: A schooner was destroyed with Molotov cocktails by Soviet Special Landing Forces during a raid on Yevpatoria, Soviet Union.

== 7 December ==
List of shipwrecks: 7 December 1941
Ship	State	Description
USS Arizona	United States Navy	USS Arizona World War II: Attack on Pearl Harbor: The Pennsylvania-class battleship was bombed and sunk by Imperial Japanese Navy aircraft with the loss of 1,177 of her 1,400 crew after her forward ammunition magazine ignited from an armor-piercing bomb.
USS California	United States Navy	World War II: Attack on Pearl Harbor: The Tennessee-class battleship was torpedoed and sunk by Imperial Japanese Navy aircraft with the loss of 100 of her 1,083 crew. She was refloated on 25 March 1942, repaired and returned to service.
USS Cassin	United States Navy	USS Downes and USS Cassin World War II: Attack on Pearl Harbor: The Mahan-class destroyer was bombed and damaged by Imperial Japanese Navy aircraft. Initially assessed as a total loss, she was later repaired and returned to service.
HMS Chantala	Royal Navy	World War II: The 3,129 GRT armed boarding vessel struck a mine and sank at Tobruk, Libya with the loss of four of her crew.
Cynthia Olson	United States	Cynthia Olson sinking. World War II: The steam cargo ship was sunk by gunfire in the Pacific Ocean 300 nautical miles (560 km; 350 mi) off San Francisco, California, at 33°42′N 145°29′W by the submarine I-26 (Imperial Japanese Navy). All 35 people on board survived the sinking and abandoned ship in two lifeboats. The submarine I-19 (Imperial Japanese Navy) provided them with food on 8 December, but after that they were never seen or heard from again.
USS Downes	United States Navy	World War II: Attack on Pearl Harbor: The Mahan-class destroyer was bombed and damaged by Imperial Japanese Navy aircraft. Initially assessed as a total loss, she was later repaired and returned to service.
Ha-19	Imperial Japanese Navy	World War II: Attack on Pearl Harbor: The midget submarine ran aground a number of times near the entrance to Pearl Harbor. Her two-man crew temporarily was overcome by chlorine gas leaking from her battery. Her crew abandoned ship after lighting scuttling charges which failed to detonate. Her commanding officer survived and was captured, becoming the first prisoner-of-war captured by the United States in World War II; her other crewman drowned.
M-16, and M-22	Imperial Japanese Navy	World War II: Attack on Pearl Harbor: One of the midget submarines disappeared in or near Pearl Harbor after firing its torpedoes at USS St. Louis (United States Navy). The other entered the harbor and fired torpedoes at American ships. She was fired upon by the seaplane tenders USS Curtiss and USS Tangier and the repair ship USS Medusa (all United States Navy), then was rammed, depth charged, and sunk by the destroyer USS Monaghan (United States Navy) in Pearl Harbor northwest of Ford Island.
M-18	Imperial Japanese Navy	World War II: Attack on Pearl Harbor: Possibly the midget submarine that was depth charged and sunk in Keehi Lagoon near Pearl Harbor.
M-20	Imperial Japanese Navy	World War II: Attack on Pearl Harbor: Possibly the midget submarine that was shelled, depth charged, and sunk by the destroyer USS Ward (United States Navy) while trying to follow the general stores issue ship USS Antares (United States Navy) into Pearl Harbor.
USS Nevada	United States Navy	USS Nevada World War II: Attack on Pearl Harbor: The Nevada-class battleship was torpedoed and damaged by Imperial Japanese Navy aircraft. She was beached in a sinking condition at Hospital Point. Ahw was refloated on 12 February 1942, repaired and returned to service.
USS Oglala	United States Navy	USS Oglala World War II: Attack on Pearl Harbor: The minelayer was torpedoed and sunk by Imperial Japanese Navy aircraft. She was refloated on 3 July 1942, repaired and returned to service.
USS Oklahoma	United States Navy	World War II: Attack on Pearl Harbor: The Nevada-class battleship was torpedoed and sunk by Imperial Japanese Navy aircraft with the loss of 429 of her 1,398 crew.
Sauternes	United Kingdom	The 1,049 GRT cargo ship, confiscated French vessel, on a voyage from Leith for Torshavn with general cargo, foundered in a gale in Fugloyarfjørður, Faroe Islands with the loss of all 25 people on board.
Severn Transport	United Kingdom	World War II: The 119 GRT coaster struck a mine and sank in the Bristol Channel (51°27′N 3°04′W). Her four crew survived.
USS Shaw	United States Navy	USS Shaw World War II: Attack on Pearl Harbor: The Mahan-class destroyer was bombed and sunk by Imperial Japanese Navy aircraft whilst drydocked in USS YFD-2 (United States Navy). She was later refloated, repaired and returned to service.
USS Sotoyomo	United States Navy	World War II: Attack on Pearl Harbor: The harbor tug was sunk while drydocked in YFD-2 (United States Navy) when USS Shaw (United States Navy), also in the drydock, was bombed and sunk by Imperial Japanese Navy aircraft. She was later refloated, repaired and returned to service.
U-208	Kriegsmarine	World War II: The Type VIIC submarine was depth charged and sunk in the Atlantic Ocean west of Gibraltar (35°51′N 7°45′W) by HMS Harvester and HMS Hesperus (both Royal Navy) with the loss of all 45 crew.
USS Utah	United States Navy	USS Utah World War II: Attack on Pearl Harbor: The target ship, a former Florida-class battleship, was torpedoed and sunk by Imperial Japanese Navy aircraft with the loss of 58 of her 519 crew.
USS Vestal	United States Navy	USS Vestal World War II: Attack on Pearl Harbor: The repair ship was bombed and damaged at Pearl Harbor by Imperial Japanese Navy aircraft and was beached. She was refloated within a week, repaired and returned to service.
Welsh Prince	United Kingdom	World War II: The 5,148 GRT cargo ship on a passage from London for New York with general cargo, struck a mine and was abandoned in the North Sea off Spurn Head, Yorkshire (53°24′N 0°59′E. Her 47 crew were rescued. She ran aground, broke in two and sank.
USS West Virginia	United States Navy	USS West Virginia (right) World War II: Attack on Pearl Harbor: The Colorado-class battleship was torpedoed and sunk by Imperial Japanese Navy aircraft with the loss of at least 69 of her 1,407 crew. She was refloated on 17 May 1942, repaired and returned to service.
HMCS Windflower	Royal Canadian Navy	World War II: Convoy SC 58: The Flower-class corvette (925 GRT) was rammed by Zypenberg (Netherlands) in the Grand Banks of Newfoundland (46°19′N 49°30′W) and sank with the loss of 23 crew. The 44 survivors were rescued by HMCS Pictou (Royal Canadian Navy) and HMS Nasturtium (Royal Navy).

== 8 December ==
List of shipwrecks: 8 December 1941
Ship	State	Description
Awazisan Maru	Imperial Japanese Army	World War II: The troopship was bombed by a Lockheed Hudson aircraft of 1 Squadron, Royal Australian Air Force. She caught fire and was abandoned off Kota Bharu, Malaya (6°08′N 102°16′E). She was later sunk on 12 December at (6°08′N 102°16′E) by HNLMS K XII (Royal Netherlands Navy) with the loss of a crew member. Survivors were rescued by CH-9, and possibly by Ayanami and Shikinami (all Imperial Japanese Navy). At least one landing craft was lost.
Capillo	United States	World War II: The World War I Design 1022 cargo ship was bombed and damaged in Manila Bay, Philippines by Japanese aircraft. She was scuttled in shallow water off Corregidor by a United States Army demolition team on 11 December. The wreck was bombed again and set afire on 29 or 31 December.
Celebes Maru No. 3	Japan	World War II: The fishing lugger was strafed and damaged by a Dutch Navy Dornier Do 24 aircraft five miles (8.0 km) south of Sajang Island (00°10′N 129°54′E). She was beached on the south west tip of Tobi Island (03°00′N 131°07′E) on 11 December to prevent sinking and was abandoned.
Fireglow	United Kingdom	World War II: The 1,261 GRT cargo ship on a passage from London for Tyne in ballast, struck a mine in the Hearty Knoll Channel, and sank with the loss of a crew member.
Gertie	United Kingdom	World War II: The 370 GRT coaster on a trip from Port Talbot for Waterford with a cargo of coal, struck a British floating mine and sank in the Irish Sea two nautical miles (3.7 km; 2.3 mi) north east of the Tuskar Rock Lighthouse. Her crew were rescued by the Rosslare lifeboat.
Hai Hsiang	China	World War II: The cargo ship was sunk by the Japanese at Shanghai. She was raised and scrapped post-war.
Hsin Peking	United Kingdom	World War II: The ship was beached at the mouth of the Yangtze Estuary to prevent capture. Refloated and put in Japanese service as Rakuzan Maru.
Lord Shrewsbury	United Kingdom	World War II: The fishing trawler struck a mine and sank in the North Sea with the loss of all ten crew.
HMT Milford Earl	Royal Navy	World War II: The Castle-class naval trawler (290 GRT) was bombed and sunk in Lunan Bay, Angus by Luftwaffe aircraft with the loss of five of her ten crew.
Nisqually	United States	World War II: The World War I Design 1023 ship, converted to a scow, was bombed and sunk by Japanese aircraft at Wake Island.
USS Penguin	United States Navy	World War II: Battle of Guam: The Lapwing-class minesweeper was scuttled in Agana Harbor.
HMS Peterel	Royal Navy	World War II: The river gunboat was shelled and sunk at Shanghai, China by Izumo (Imperial Japanese Navy). Six of her eighteen crew aboard were killed.
HMT Phineas Beard	Royal Navy	World War II: The Castle-class naval trawler (278 GRT) was bombed and sunk in the North Sea off Peterhead, Aberdeenshire by Luftwaffe aircraft with the loss of twelve of her crew.
HMIS Prabhavati	Royal Indian Navy	World War II: The 556 GRT auxiliary patrol vessel towing three barges from Cochin to Karachi was mistaken for a surfaced Japanese submarine and was shelled and sunk in the Indian Ocean (15°20′N 72°29′E) just after midnight by HMS Glasgow (Royal Navy) with the loss of 23 of her 63 crew. Survivors, including twelve wounded, were rescued by HMS Glasgow. One of them died of wounds later. One barge sank with Prabhavati, and the other two were sunk by HMS Glasgow after daylight.
President Harrison	United States Navy	World War II: Under pursuit by Japanese ships and aircraft the United States Navy-chartered passenger ship was run aground on Shaweishan Island off the Yangtze delta at 16 knots (30 km/h; 18 mph) to rip her bottom out and deny her use to the Japanese. President Harrison struck the edge of the island on her port side and then rolled off. The impact ripped a hole 90 feet (27 m) long, but does not reach the engine room spaces. The ship almost turned over, but righted herself. Strong currents then carried her off the rocks and she settled on a mud bank. Her crew and Marines aboard abandoned ship, but the ship's exposed turning propeller splits one lifeboat in half, killing three men and severely injuring many others. She was later refloated, repaired, and put in service by the Japanese as Kakko Maru.
Ravnaas	Norway	World War II: The cargo ship was sunk in the Philippine Sea east of Samar Island by Japanese aircraft. She was subsequently salvaged, repaired and entered Japanese service as Ikutagawa Maru.
Soochow	United Kingdom	World War II: The cargo liner was scuttled at Hong Kong. She was raised in 1942, repaired and put in Japanese service as Tozan Maru.
HMS St Dominic	Royal Navy	World War II: The Saint-class tug was sunk by Imperial Japanese Navy surface ships south of the Saddle Islands, near the mouth of the Yangtze.
Sumatra	Italy	World War II: The ocean liner was scuttled at Phuket, Thailand.
Volpi	Italy	World War II: The cargo ship was scuttled at Phuket.
XXVIII Ottobre	Italy	World War II: The cargo ship was scuttled at Phuket.

== 9 December ==
List of shipwrecks: 9 December 1941
Ship	State	Description
Bjønn	Norway	World War II: The 5,509 GRT cargo ship on a trip from Trondheimsfjorden to Danzig with a cargo of iron ore, was bombed and sunk at Hustadvika, Norway, with the loss of four of her crew.
M 1203 Bürgermeister Schmidt	Kriegsmarine	World War II: The minesweeper was bombed and sunk in the Bay of Biscay off Brest, Finistère, France by Royal Air Force aircraft.
Donerail	Panama	World War II: The 4,473 GRT cargo ship on a trip from Suva for Vancouver with a cargo of sugar, was shelled and sunk in the Pacific Ocean 200 nautical miles (370 km) southeast of Hawaii (8°N 152°W) by I-10 (Imperial Japanese Navy) with the loss of 32 lives. Eight crewmen survived the sinking and the 38-day voyage in the lifeboat to Tarawa, Gilbert Islands.
Kantung	United Kingdom	World War II: The cargo ship was scuttled as a blockship at Anking, China.
Kokoku Maru	Japan	World War II: The auxiliary schooner, serving as a pearling boat mother ship, was bombed and sunk east of Halmahera Island by a Dornier Do 24 aircraft of the Netherlands Naval Aviation Service. Ten of her sixteen crew were killed. Survivors were rescued by Celebes Maru No. 3 (Japan).
Macau	United Kingdom	World War II: The cargo ship was scuttled as a blockship at Anking.
Madrid	Kriegsmarine	World War II: The depot ship was bombed and sunk in the North Sea off Den Helder, North Holland, Netherlands by Royal Air Force aircraft with the loss of twelve lives.
Nimanoa	United Kingdom	World War II: The ketch was scuttled at Tarawa to prevent capture.
On Lee	United Kingdom	World War II: The passenger ship was scuttled at Hong Kong.
Sebastiano Veniero	Nazi Germany	World War II: The prisoner of war (POW)-carrying requisitioned cargo ship was torpedoed and damaged in the Mediterranean Sea off Navarino by HMS Porpoise (Royal Navy) and was beached. She was torpedoed and totally wrecked on 15 December off Cape Methene by HMS Torbay (Royal Navy). Two hundred Commonwealth prisoners of war were killed; 1,800 prisoners of war were rescued by Arno (Italy).
Saint Denis	Vichy France	World War II: The cargo ship was torpedoed and sunk in the Mediterranean Sea south of the Balearic Islands, Spain by U-652 (Kriegsmarine) with the loss of three of her crew.
Steinbek	Germany	World War II: In an instance of naval friendly fire, the cargo ship was torpedoed and sunk in the Barents Sea off Tanafjord, Norway (71°09′N 29°25′E) by U-134 (Kriegsmarine), uninformed of the German convoy proceeding in the area. There were twelve dead and twelve survivors.

== 10 December ==
List of shipwrecks: 10 December 1941
Ship	State	Description
HMS Banka	Royal Navy	World War II: The auxiliary minesweeper struck a mine and sank in the South China Sea off Tioman Island, Philippines with the loss of 43 of her 49 crew.
USS Bittern	United States Navy	World War II: The Lapwing-class minesweeper was scuttled in Manila Bay following damage received in an Imperial Japanese Navy air raid on Cavite Navy Yard, Manila, Philippines.
Cetus	Philippines	World War II: The cargo ship was scuttled in the Philippines. She was later raised, repaired, and put in Japanese service as Hokuhi Maru.
Chung Shan	United Kingdom	The 1,085 GRT cargo ship was either scuttled or shelled and sunk by the Japanese artillery at Kowloon Bay, Hong Kong.
Hareldawins	United Kingdom	World War II: The 1,288 GRT cargo ship on a trip from Hong Kong for Singapore was torpedoed and sunk in the South China Sea 8 miles (13 km) west of Darigayos Point, Luzon, Philippines by I-124 (Imperial Japanese Navy). Her crew were rescued but the captain was taken prisoner.
Helena A	United Kingdom	The auxiliary sailing ship ran aground on Butaritari, Gilbert Islands and was wrecked.
Hsin Fuhle	United Kingdom	World War II: The 184 GRT tug was sunk at Hong Kong by enemy action.
I-70	Imperial Japanese Navy	World War II: The Kaidai-class submarine was sunk in the Pacific Ocean (23°45′N 155°35′W) by Douglas SBD Dauntless dive bomber aircraft based on USS Enterprise (United States Navy). Lost with all 93 hands.
Kincorth	United Kingdom	World War II: The drifter struck a mine and sank in the Irish Sea 7 nautical miles (13 km) off Point Lynas Lighthouse, Anglesey with the loss of all eleven of her crew.
Kirnwood	United Kingdom	World War II: Convoy SC 57: The cargo ship was torpedoed and sunk in the Atlantic Ocean (56°57′N 16°35′W) by U-130 (Kriegsmarine) with the loss of twelve of her 45 crew. Survivors were rescued by Dewsbury (United Kingdom).
Kurdistan	United Kingdom	World War II: Convoy SC 57: The cargo ship was torpedoed and sunk in the Atlantic Ocean (56°51′N 16°36′W) by U-130 (Kriegsmarine) with the loss of ten of the 66 people on board. Survivors were rescued by HMS Kingcup (Royal Navy).
M-54	Soviet Navy	The M-class submarine ran aground in the Black Sea off Tuapse. She was refloated on 30 June 1942 and towed in to Anapa.
Mauna Ala	United States	The 6,256 GRT cargo ship on a voyage from Seattle for Honolulu with general cargo, including Christmas trees and food for the troops stationed in Hawaii, was re-routed back to Portland due to the attack on Pearl Harbor. During the ensuing blackout on the west coast, she ran aground at Clatsop Beach, Oregon (45°30′N 122°45′W) and was wrecked.
Oigawa Maru	Imperial Japanese Army	World War II: Vigan Invasion Force: The Type 1A Standard transport was bombed and damaged off Pandan, near Vigan, Luzon by Boeing B-17 Flying Fortress aircraft of the Far East Air Forces' 14th Bomb Squadron. She was beached at Aparri, Philippines. Oigawa Maru was later refloated, repaired, returned to service.
Oregon	United States	The cargo ship collided with USS New Mexico (United States Navy) and sank in the Atlantic Ocean (39°55′N 69°45′W) with the loss of seventeen of her crew.
HMS Prince of Wales	Royal Navy	World War II: Sinking of Prince of Wales and Repulse: The King George V-class battleship was bombed and sunk in the South China Sea east of Kuantan, Malaya by Imperial Japanese Navy aircraft with the loss of 327 of her 1,521 crew.
HMS Repulse	Royal Navy	World War II: Sinking of Prince of Wales and Repulse: The Renown-class battlecruiser was bombed and sunk in the South China Sea east of Kuantan by Imperial Japanese Navy aircraft with the loss of 508 of her 967 crew.
USS Santa Rita	United States Navy	World War II: The ferry launch was bombed and sunk during the Imperial Japanese Navy air raid on Cavite Navy Yard.
Sagoland	Philippines	World War II: The 5,334 GRT cargo ship anchored in Manila Bay, was bombed and set afire by Mitsubishi G4M bombers. She sank the next day.
USS Sealion	United States Navy	World War II: The Sargo-class submarine was bombed and damaged at Cavite Navy Yard by Imperial Japanese Navy aircraft. She was scuttled on 25 December owing to damage received and damage done to the navy yard which precluded repairs being carried out.
Star of Luxor	Egypt	World War II: Convoy SC 57: The cargo ship was torpedoed and sunk in the Atlantic Ocean (56°57′N 16°35′W) by U-130 (Kriegsmarine) with the loss of four of her 56 crew. Survivors were rescued by HMS Sunflower (Royal Navy).
Taiyuan	United Kingdom	World War II: The cargo ship was bombed and damaged at Manila by Japanese aircraft. She was repaired and returned to service.
Takao Maru	Imperial Japanese Army	World War II: Vigan Invasion Force: The Takao Maru-class transport ship was bombed by United States Army Air Forces aircraft at Santa, Ilocos Sur, Luzon (17°29′N 120°26′E) and was beached. She was destroyed on 5 March 1942 by Philippine guerrillas and later stripped for usable parts.
TKA-12	Soviet Navy	The torpedo boat was holed by ice and sank in the Baltic Sea. Her crew were rescued by the minesweeper T-205 (Soviet Navy.
W-10	Imperial Japanese Navy	World War II: Vigan Invasion Force: The No.7-class minesweeper was strafed, exploded, and sank off Pandan 17°32′N 120°22′E by a Seversky P-35 aircraft of the Far East Air Forces' 34th Pursuit Squadron. The explosion blew a wing off the aircraft and it crashed into the sea.
W-19	Imperial Japanese Navy	World War II: The No.19-class minesweeper was bombed and damaged off Luzon by Boeing B-17 Flying Fortress aircraft of the Far East Air Forces' 14th Bomb Squadron. She was beached at Aparri 18°22′N 121°38′E. She was declared a total loss.

== 11 December ==
List of shipwrecks: 11 December 1941
Ship	State	Description
Alcione	Regia Marina	World War II: The Spica-class torpedo boat was torpedoed and damaged in the Mediterranean Sea (36°20′N 20°33′E) off Suda Bay, Crete, Greece by HMS Truant (Royal Navy) and was towed close to shore where she capsized and sank with a loss of twenty of her crew.
Alphar	Norway	World War II: The fishing vessel was shelled and sunk off Mylingen by K-22 (Soviet Navy).
Ammiraglio Caracciolo	Regia Marina	World War II: The Cagni-class submarine was depth charged, shelled, and damaged in the Mediterranean Sea (32°09′N 25°19′E) by HMS Farndale (Royal Navy) and was subsequently scuttled by her crew. One passenger, an army general, was killed. Fifty-three survivors were rescued by HMS Farndale.
Apsheron	Soviet Union	World War II: The 3,781 GRT tanker on her trip to Sevastopol with a cargo of fuel, struck a Soviet mine and sank in the Black Sea off Sevastopol.
Borgar	Norway	World War II: The fishing vessel was shelled and sunk off Mylingen by K-22 (Soviet Navy).
Calitea	Italy	World War II: The 4,013 GRT passenger ship travelling in a convoy from Brindisi for Benghazi, was torpedoed and sunk in the Mediterranean Sea 90 nautical miles (170 km) west of Cape Matapan (36°23′N 20°33′E) by HMS Talisman (Royal Navy). Thirty-three crew, six gunners and 116 military passengers were killed. There were 227 or 230 survivors.
Hai Tung	Norway	World War II: The cargo ship was shelled and sunk in the South China Sea (5°08′N 104°32′E) by I-156 (Imperial Japanese Navy) with the loss of all 49 of her crew.
Hayate	Imperial Japanese Navy	World War II: Battle of Wake Island: The Kamikaze-class destroyer was sunk off Wake Island by shore based artillery with the loss of 168 of her crew. Only one survivor was rescued.
Kisaragi	Imperial Japanese Navy	World War II: Battle of Wake Island: The Mutsuki-class destroyer was bombed and sunk in the Pacific Ocean 30 nautical miles (56 km) south west of Wake Island (18°55′N 166°17′E) by a Grumman F4F Wildcat aircraft of the VMF-211, United States Marine Corps with the loss of all 154 crew.
HMT Lady Shirley	Royal Navy	World War II: The naval trawler was torpedoed and sunk in the Strait of Gibraltar (35°59′N 5°17′W) by U-374 (Kriegsmarine) with the loss of all 33 crew.
Lahaina	United States	World War II: The cargo ship as torpedoed and sunk in the Pacific Ocean (27°42′N 147°38′W) by I-9 (Imperial Japanese Navy) with the loss of four of her 34 crew. Survivors were rescued by USCGC Tiger ( United States Coast Guard).
MO-303	Soviet Navy	The MO-4-class motor patrol boat was crushed by ice east of Lavansaari.
MO-307	Soviet Navy	The MO-4-class motor patrol boat was crushed by ice off Lavansaari.
Nanning	United Kingdom	World War II: The cargo ship was scuttled at Hong Kong. She was salvaged in 1942 and entered Japanese service asNannei Maru.
PK-407	Soviet Navy	The MO-4-class motor patrol boat was crushed by ice off Lavansaari.
HMY Rosabelle	Royal Navy	World War II: The armed yacht was torpedoed and sunk in the Strait of Gibraltar (35°59′N 5°17′W) by U-374 (Kriegsmarine) with the loss off 30 of her 48 crew. Survivors were rescued by HMY Sayonara (Royal Navy).
Sofia	Greece	World War II: The coaster was torpedoed and sunk north west of Suda Bay by HMS Torbay (Royal Navy).
Tinley	United Kingdom	World War II: The coaster was scuttled at Hong Kong.
ТКА-12	Soviet Navy	The D-3-class motor torpedo boat was crushed by ice east of Lavansaari.
ТКА-42	Soviet Navy	The D-3-class motor torpedo boat was crushed by ice east of Lavansaari.
Wawa	Panama	World War II: The cargo ship was scuttled at Hong Kong. She was raised, repaired and put in Japanese service in May 1943 as Awa Maru.

== 12 December ==
List of shipwrecks: 12 December 1941
Ship	State	Description
Admiral Y. S. Williams	United States	World War II: The cargo ship was scuttled at Hong Kong. She was later salvaged, and entered Japanese service as Tatsutama Maru.
Ariadne Moller	United Kingdom	World War II: The cargo ship was scuttled at Hong Kong. She was raised, repaired and put in Japanese service as Chikuzan Maru.
Atlas	Kriegsmarine	World War II: The transport ship was torpedoed and sunk in the Mediterranean Sea (31°42′N 19°07′E) by HMS Thrasher (Royal Navy).
Awazisan Maru	Imperial Japanese Army	World War II: The troopship was abandoned off Kota Bharu, Malaya on 8 December after being bombed by a Lockheed Hudson aircraft of No. 11 Squadron, Royal Australian Air Force, and catching fire, she was sunk at (6°08′N 102°16′E) by the submarine HNLMS K XII (Royal Netherlands Navy).
Bencleuch	United Kingdom	The cargo ship caught fire and was abandoned in the Atlantic Ocean south east of Cape Farewell, Greenland (53°10′N 38°00′W). She later sank. The cause of the fire may have been sabotage.
Dromore Castle	United Kingdom	World War II: The British Standard WWI modified Type B cargo ship struck a mine and sank in the North Sea 20 nautical miles (37 km; 23 mi) south south east of the mouth of the Humber (53°29′08″N 0°52′00″E). Her 55 crew were rescued.
Governor Wright	Philippines	World War II: The passenger ship was bombed and sunk in the Visayan Sea off Cebu (12°55′N 123°55′E) by Japanese aircraft.
Haraldsvang	Norway	World War II: The cargo ship was scuttled at Hong Kong. She was raised by the Japanese in June 1942 and renamed Toryu Maru.
Hydra II	Norway	World War II: The cargo ship was torpedoed and sunk in the South China Sea off Mindoro, Philippines by USS S-38 (United States Navy) with the loss of 41 of her 50 crew.
Joan Moller	United Kingdom	World War II: The cargo ship was scuttled at Hong Kong. She was raised, repaired and put in Japanese service as Gyoryu Maru.
Kampar	Royal Navy	World War II: The auxiliary anti-submarine ship was bombed and damaged at Penang, Malaya by Japanese aircraft and was beached and abandoned. She was bombed again the next day and her magazine exploded. The vessel was declared a total loss. Her crew were rescued. Japanese began repairs in place in March 1943, which were finished on 15 July 1943. She was put in Japanese service as Kasumi Maru.
Manatawny	Philippines	World War II: The former World War I Design 1022 ship, converted to a sardine factory ship, was bombed and damaged in Manila Bay by Japanese aircraft. She sank on 11 January 1942.
Marion	Panama	World War II: The cargo ship was scuttled in the Philippines.
HMS Moth	Royal Navy	World War II: The Insect-class gunboat was scuttled at Hong Kong. She was later salvaged by the Japanese and entered Imperial Japanese Navy service as Suma.
P III	Greece	World War II. The cargo schooner was shelled and sunk in the Mediterranean Sea off Cape Drepano, Greece by HMS Torbay (Royal Navy).
Southern Sea	United Kingdom	The ocean liner ran aground off Libreville, French Equatorial Africa and was wrecked.
HMS Tamar	Royal Navy	World War II: The receiving ship was scuttled by shelling by the Royal Artillery at Hong Kong.
Tanjong	United Kingdom	World War II: The ferry was bombed and sunk at Penang by Japanese aircraft.
Toro Maru	Imperial Japanese Army	World War II: The 1,939 GRT transport ship was torpedoed and sunk in the South China Sea off Kota Bharu (06°08′N 102°16′E) by HNLMS K XII (Royal Netherlands Navy).
HMS Tung Wo	Royal Navy	World War II: The armed examination vessel was bombed and damaged at Penang. One Chinese crewman was mortally wounded. She was bombed again and abandoned the next day. She eventually sank. HMS Tung Wo was refloated sometime in 1942, repaired and put in Japanese service as Dowa Maru.
V 5101 Blitz	Kriegsmarine	World War II: The vorpostenboot was torpedoed and sunk in Nordfjord by Royal Air Force aircraft.

== 13 December ==
List of shipwrecks: 13 December 1941
Ship	State	Description
Alberico da Barbiano	Regia Marina	World War II: Battle of Cape Bon: The Giussano-class cruiser was torpedoed, shelled and sunk in the Mediterranean Sea off Cape Bon Tunisia by the 4th Destroyer Flotilla, Royal Navy.^{[Note 2]}
Alberto di Giussano	Regia Marina	World War II: Battle of Cape Bon: The Giussano-class cruiser was torpedoed, shelled and sunk in the Mediterranean Sea off Cape Bon by the 4th Destroyer Flotilla, Royal Navy.
Asosan Maru	Imperial Japanese Army	World War II: Patani Invasion: The requisitioned 8,812 GRT cargo ship was torpedoed and damaged, and subsequently sank in shallow water at Pattani by HNLMS O 16 (Royal Netherlands Navy). Salvage work began 9 March 1942. Temporary repairs were made at Hong Kong, and finished in Japan in December 1942. She was returned to service
Badalona	Spain	World War II: The tanker was stopped, torpedoed and sunk in the Atlantic Ocean (36°43′N 3°30′W) by U-453 (Kriegsmarine) with the loss of three of her crew.
Carlo del Greco	Italy	World War II: The 6,837 GRT cargo ship proceeding towards assembly point for convoy M.42 with a cargo of supplies, 11 Panzer II and 34 Panzer III tanks of Panzer Regiment 5, was torpedoed and sunk in the Mediterranean Sea 15 nautical miles (28 km) off Capo Vito, Sicily (40°10′N 7°50′E) by HMS Upright (Royal Navy).
Chung On	Hong Kong	World War II: The cargo ship was scuttled at Hong Kong.
Fabio Filzi	Regia Marina	World War II: The 6,836 GRT cargo ship proceeding towards assembly point for convoy M.42 with a cargo of supplies, 52 M13/40 tanks of XII Battaglione, was torpedoed and sunk in the Mediterranean Sea 15 nautical miles (28 km; 17 mi) off Capo Vito (40°10′N 17°50′E) by HMS Upright (Royal Navy).
Kinka Maru	Imperial Japanese Army	World War II: Patani Invasion: The requisitioned 9,305 GRT cargo-passenger ship was torpedoed and damaged and subsequently sank in shallow water at Pattani by HNLMS O 16 (Royal Netherlands Navy). Salvage work began on 9 March 1942. Kinka Maru was refloated and repaired at Hong Kong. Work was finished in December 1942, and she was returned to service.
Nikkoku Maru	Imperial Japanese Navy	The requisitioned 2,728 GRT cargo ship ran aground on the north coast of Hainan Island. She broke in two and sank on 18 December in stormy weather.
Tosan Maru	Imperial Japanese Army	World War II: Patani Invasion: The requisitioned 8,684 GRT passenger-cargo ship was torpedoed and damaged and subsequently sank in shallow water at Pattani by HNLMS O 16 (Royal Netherlands Navy). Tosan Maru was refloated in April 1942, towed to Hong Kong for repairs that were finished in December 1942 and was returned to service.
PK-304	Soviet Navy	The MO-2-class patrol boat was crushed by ice during evacuation of Hanko.
PK-305	Soviet Navy	The MO-2-class patrol boat was crushed by ice during evacuation of Hanko.
PK-307	Soviet Navy	The MO-4-class patrol boat was crushed by ice off Lavansaari.
PK-405	Soviet Navy	The MO-4-class patrol boat was crushed by ice off Lavansaari.
PK-406	Soviet Navy	The MO-4-class patrol boat was crushed by ice off Lavansaari.
Vincent	United States	World War II: The 6,210 GRT cargo ship on a trip from Sydney for New York via the Panama Canal with a cargo of rice, was torpedoed, shelled and sunk in the Pacific Ocean off Pitcairn Island (22°41′S 118°19′W) by Aikoku Maru and Hōkoku Maru (both Imperial Japanese Navy). Her 36 crew were captured and taken aboard Hōkoku Maru as prisoners of war.

== 14 December ==
List of shipwrecks: 14 December 1941
Ship	State	Description
Cassequel	Portugal	World War II: The cargo ship was torpedoed and sunk in the Atlantic Ocean (35°08′N 11°14′W) by U-108 (Kriegsmarine). Her 57 crew were rescued; 13 of them by HMS Campion (Royal Navy).
HMS Galatea	Royal Navy	World War II: The Arethusa-class cruiser may have been torpedoed and damaged in the Mediterranean Sea off Alexandria, Egypt (34°01′N 26°02′E) by Dagabur (Regia Marina). She was torpedoed and sunk at 31°17′N 29°31′E by U-557 (Kriegsmarine) with the loss of 469 of her 613 crew. Survivors were rescued by HMS Griffin and HMS Hotspur (both Royal Navy).
Høegh Merchant	Norway	World War II: The cargo ship was torpedoed and sunk in the Pacific Ocean 29 nautical miles (54 km; 33 mi) off Cape Makapuu, Oahu, Hawaii, United States by I-4 (Imperial Japanese Navy). Her 40 passengers and crew were rescued by USS Trever (United States Navy).
Lofjord	Kriegsmarine	The accommodation ship caught fire at Danzig-Neufahrwasser with the loss of 28 lives and was declared a total loss. She was subsequently used as a target ship. Lofjord was scrapped in 1951.
HMS MA/SB 30	Royal Navy	The motor anti-submarine boat sank after hitting the Humber boom.
Miharu Maru	Japan	The cargo ship foundered south of Hokkaido.
HMS MTB 68	Royal Navy	The Thorneycroft 55-foot-class motor torpedo boat collided with HMS MTB 215 (Royal Navy) and sank off Tobruk, Libya.
Topaz	Norway	World War II: The coaster was bombed and sunk in the North Sea off the coast of Norway by Allied aircraft with the loss of all six crew.
Wilhelmina	Denmark	The cargo ship was wrecked at Kammarbrinken, Utlangen.
Zuiko Maru	Imperial Japanese Navy	The auxiliary gunboat dragged her anchor in a storm and grounded on a reef off Matsura Jima, Kuril Islands. All of her crew, except 13 who remained aboard, were rescued by Ishigaki and Kaiko Maru (both Imperial Japanese Navy). Zuiko Maru was abandoned by its remaining crew on 30 March and sank at a later date.

== 15 December ==
List of shipwrecks: 15 December 1941
Ship	State	Description
Agios Georgios	Greece	World War II: The sailing vessel was shelled and sunk by HMS Torbay (Royal Navy) one mile (1.6 km) off Cape Methoni.
Empire Barracuda	United Kingdom	World War II: Convoy HG 76: The Design 1022 ship was torpedoed and sunk in the Atlantic Ocean (35°30′N 6°17′W) by U-77 (Kriegsmarine). She sank with the loss of 13 of her 52 crew. Survivors were rescued by HMS Coltsfoot (Royal Navy).
Indira	Royal Navy	World War II: The tug/auxiliary minesweeper was bombed and sunk at Hong Kong by Japanese aircraft.
Kyriakula	Greece	World War II: The sailing vessel was shelled and sunk by HMS Torbay (Royal Navy) one mile (1.6 km) off Cape Methoni.
HNLMS O 16	Royal Netherlands Navy	World War II: The submarine struck a mine and sank off Tioman Island with the loss of 41 of her 42 crew.
USS PT-33	United States Navy	The PT boat was lost to grounding off Cape Santiago, Luzon, Philippines.
HMS Thracian	Royal Navy	The S-class destroyer ran aground at high speed and was damaged at Hong Kong. She was refloated and continued in service.
U-127	Kriegsmarine	World War II: The Type IXC submarine (1,540 GRT) was depth charged and sunk in the Atlantic Ocean off Cape St. Vincent, Portugal (36°27′N 9°12′W) by HMAS Nestor (Royal Australian Navy) with the loss of all 51 of her crew.
Viscaya	Philippines	World War II: The cargo ship was scuttled in Manila Bay.
Three unnamed vessels	Imperial Japanese Navy	World War II: British Borneo (Sarawak) Invasion Convoy: The three Daihatsu-class landing craft capsized when lowered into the water from a transport during a storm off Miri. Nineteen Imperial Japanese Army troops were killed and fifteen were reported missing.

== 16 December ==
List of shipwrecks: 16 December 1941
Ship	State	Description
Atsutasan Maru	Imperial Japanese Army	World War II: The Aosan Maru-class auxiliary anti-aircraft transport was torpedoed and damaged in the East China Sea south of Samah, China (18°06′N 109°44′E) by USS Swordfish (United States Navy). Three of her crew and 25 gunners were killed. She drifted abandoned for two days before sinking.
Halldor	Norway	World War II: The 1,515 GRT cargo ship, berthed in Hong Kong harbor since her arrival on 9 December, was hit by Japanese artillery bombardment and damaged killing her captain and 2nd engineer. She was salvaged by the Japanese, repaired and entered service as Haruta Maru in 1942.
LCT 11	Royal Navy	The Landing Craft, Tank foundered off Sollum, Egypt.
MTB 8	Royal Navy	World War II: The BPB 60-foot-class motor torpedo boat was bombed, set on fire, and sunk at Hong Kong by Japanese aircraft.
Nidardal	Norway	World War II: Convoy SC 58: The cargo ship (2,368 GRT) foundered in the Atlantic Ocean (56°07′N 21°00′W) due to engine trouble in bad weather. All 25 crew were rescued by HMCS Pictou (Royal Canadian Navy).
Parthian	United Kingdom	The fishing trawler was sunk in a collision off the Isle of Lewis.
U-557	Kriegsmarine	The Type VIIC submarine was accidentally rammed and sunk in the Mediterranean Sea west of Crete, Greece by Orione (Regia Marina) with the loss of all 43 crew.
Two unnamed ships	Japan	World War II: Battle of Hong Kong: The two anchored steamships were shelled and sunk in Kowloon Bay, 1,000 yards (910 m) east of the electric power station by HMS Thracian (Royal Navy).

== 17 December ==
List of shipwrecks: 17 December 1941
Ship	State	Description
Col. William B. Cowin	United States Army	The ferry sank in 75 feet (23 m) of water within 30 minutes of striking the Hens and Chickens Reef in Buzzards Bay off Westport, Massachusetts, three nautical miles (5.6 km; 3.5 mi) east-southeast of Gooseberry Island (41°28.3′N 070°58.8′W).
Corregidor	Philippines	World War II: The passenger ship (1,676 GRT) struck a mine and sank in Manila Bay off Corregidor Island. Between 900 and 1,200 people lost their lives, while 282 survivors rescued by USS PT-32, USS PT-34, and USS PT-35 (all United States Navy).
Lina	Italy	World War II: The 1,235 GRT coastal tanker on a passage from Pantelleria for Tripoli via Lampedusa, was bombed and sunk in the Mediterranean Sea 50 nautical miles (93 km) northwest of Tripoli, (33°58′N 12°03′E) by 4 Fairey Swordfish of 803 Squadron, Fleet Air Arm. Two of her 22 crew were killed. The survivors, including three wounded, were rescued by the rescue ship Laurana (Italy).
M-59	Soviet Navy	World War II: The M-class submarine was depth charged and sunk by the destroyer Regele Ferdinand (Royal Romanian Navy).
Manini	United States	World War II: The 3,253 GRT cargo ship on a trip from Vancouver for Wellington via Honolulu, was torpedoed and sunk in the Pacific Ocean 108 nautical miles (200 km; 124 mi) south of Hawaii by I-75 (Imperial Japanese Navy) with the loss of two of her crew. Survivors were rescued by USS Allen (United States Navy) on 27 December, and USS Patterson (United States Navy) on 28 December.
Olivia H	United States	The motor vessel sank at Dayville, Territory of Alaska (60°05′N 146°21′W).
Ro-66	Imperial Japanese Navy	World War II: The Ro-60-class submarine collided with Ro-62 (Imperial Japanese Navy) and sank in the Pacific Ocean off Wake Island. Three sailors were picked up by Ro-62, but 63 others were killed.
Shinonome	Imperial Japanese Navy	World War II: Invasion of British Borneo (Sarawak): Invasion Convoy: The Fubuki-class destroyer was bombed, exploded and sunk in the South China Sea off Miri, Sarawak (4°24′N 114°00′E) by Dornier Do 24 aircraft of GVT-7, Netherlands Naval Aviation Service with the loss of all hands (some 221 officers and sailors).
HMS Thracian	Royal Navy	World War II: The S-class destroyerwas deliberately run aground off Round Island, between Repulse Bay and Deepwater Bay, Hong Kong. She was later salvaged by the Japanese and entered Imperial Japanese Navy service as Patrol Boat No. 101.
U-131	Kriegsmarine	World War II: The Type IXC submarine was depth charged, torpedoed and sunk in the Atlantic Ocean west of Madeira, Portugal (34°12′N 13°35′W) by ships of the 36th Escort Group^{[Note 3]} and Grumman Martlet aircraft of 802 Squadron, Fleet Air Arm based on HMS Audacity (Royal Navy). Her 55 crew were rescued by HMS Stanley (Royal Navy).

== 18 December ==
List of shipwrecks: 18 December 1941
Ship	State	Description
RT-4 Navaga	Soviet Union	World War II: The 609 GRT fishing trawler returning from fishing grounds, was bombed and sunk at Vostochnaya Litsa Bay by Luftwaffe aircraft. Her crew survived, some were wounded.
Perekop	Soviet Union	World War II: The 2,493 GRT cargo ship on a trip from Vladivostok for Surabaja, was bombed and sunk in the South China Sea east of the Natuna Islands, Netherlands East Indies (4°50′N 106°30′E) by Japanese aircraft with the loss of eight of her 40 crew.
NN 02 Steinbock	Kriegsmarine	The naval whaler ran aground at Seiskjær, near Bodø, Norway (67°44′N 14°26′E). She later sank.
U-434	Kriegsmarine	World War II: The Type VIIC submarine was depth charged and sunk in the Atlantic Ocean north of Madeira, Portugal (36°15′N 15°48′W) by HMS Blankney and HMS Stanley (both Royal Navy) with the loss of two of her 44 crew.

== 19 December ==
List of shipwrecks: 19 December 1941
Ship	State	Description
HMS Aldgate	Royal Navy	World War II: Battle of Hong Kong: The Moorgate-class boom defence vessel was scuttled at Hong Kong.
HMS Alliance	Royal Navy	World War II: Battle of Hong Kong: The Alliance-class tug was scuttled in Deepwater Bay, Hong Kong.
HMS Barlight	Royal Navy	World War II: Battle of Hong Kong: The Bar-class boom defence vessel was scuttled at Hong Kong. She was later raised, repaired and taken into Imperial Japanese Navy service as Ma-101.
HMS Cornflower	Royal Navy	World War II: Battle of Hong Kong: The Arabis-class sloop was scuttled at Hong Kong.
RFA Ebonol	Royal Fleet Auxiliary	World War II: Battle of Hong Kong: The tanker was scuttled at Hong Kong. She was later salvaged by the Japanese, repaired and entered Imperial Japanese Navy service as Enoshima Maru.
G-32 Ferruccio	Regia Marina	World War II: The 83 GRT auxiliary minesweeper, a former steam tug, collided with Nicoloso da Recco (Regia Marina) and sank at Tripoli, Libya.
Jinsei Maru	Imperial Japanese Navy	World War II: The 139 GRT auxiliary patrol ship ran aground on Roro Island, Truk and was wrecked.
Kong Haakon VII, and Myrmidon	Norway; United Kingdom	The cargo ship Kong Haakon VII collided with the ocean liner Myrmidon at Whiteinch, Renfrewshire on being launched. Both vessels were severely damaged.
Krechet	Soviet Union	World War II: The ship was reported as bombed and sunk at Hong Kong by Japanese aircraft, but other sources say she was sunk by Japanese artillery, or point out that she might have also been targeted by British artillery from Kowloon.
HMS MTB 12	Royal Navy	World War II: Battle of Hong Kong: The motor torpedo boat was sunk at Hong Kong by Japanese landing craft.
HMS MTB 26	Royal Navy	World War II: Battle of Hong Kong: The motor torpedo boat was sunk at Hong Kong by Japanese landing craft. Her commanding officer was killed.
Man Kim	United Kingdom	World War II: Battle of Hong Kong: The ferry was scuttled at Hong Kong.
Man Kung	United Kingdom	World War II: Battle of Hong Kong: The ferry was scuttled at Hong Kong.
Mouette	United Kingdom	World War II: The fishing boat struck a mine and sank in the Bristol Channel off Minehead, Somerset with the loss of two of her crew.
HMS Neptune	Royal Navy	World War II: First Battle of Sirte: The Leander-class cruiser struck a mine and was sunk off Sirte, Libya with the loss of all but one of her 767 crew.
HNLMS O 20	Royal Netherlands Navy	World War II: The O 19-class submarine was shelled and sunk in the South China Sea by Uranami (Imperial Japanese Navy).
HMS Poet Chaucer	Royal Navy	World War II: Battle of Hong Kong: The tug was scuttled in Deepwater Bay.
Prusa	United States	World War II: The 5,113 GRT cargo ship on a trip from Manila for Baltimore via Honolulu, was torpedoed and sunk in the Pacific Ocean 150 nautical miles (280 km; 170 mi) south of Oahu (17°30′N 157°00′W) by I-72 (Imperial Japanese Navy) with the loss of eight of her 33 crew. Fourteen survivors were rescued by USCGC Tiger (United States Coast Guard) on 27 December, and a Fijian Government ship rescued the eleven others after a 2,700-mile (4,300 km) journey in a lifeboat.
HMS Redstart	Royal Navy	World War II: Battle of Hong Kong: The minelayer was scuttled at Hong Kong.
Ruckinge	United Kingdom	World War II: Convoy HG 76: The cargo ship was torpedoed and damaged in the Atlantic Ocean (38°20′N 17°15′W) by U-108 (Kriegsmarine) with the loss of three of her 42 crew. Survivors were rescued by Finland (United Kingdom) and HMS Stork (Royal Navy). Ruckinge was scuttled by HMS Samphire (Royal Navy).
Sergei Lazo	Soviet Union	World War II: Battle of Hong Kong: The ship was reported as bombed and sunk at Hong Kong by Japanese aircraft, but other sources say she was sunk by Japanese artillery. or point out that she might have also been targeted by British artillery from Kowloon. She was later refloated.
Simferopol	Soviet Union	World War II: Battle of Hong Kong: The ship was reported as bombed and sunk at Hong Kong by Japanese aircraft, but other sources say she was sunk by Japanese artillery or point out that she might have also been targeted by British artillery from Kowloon. She was later refloated.
HMS Stanley	Royal Navy	World War II: Convoy HG 76: The Town-class destroyer was torpedoed and sunk in the Atlantic Ocean (38°12′N 17°23′W) by U-574 (Kriegsmarine) with the loss of 95 of her 120 crew. Survivors were rescued by HMS Samphire and HMS Stork (both Royal Navy).
Svirstroi	Soviet Union	World War II: Battle of Hong Kong: The ship was reported as bombed and sunk at Hong Kong by Japanese aircraft, but other sources say she was sunk by Japanese artillery or point out that she might have also been targeted by British artillery from Kowloon. She was later refloated.
HMS Tern	Royal Navy	World War II: Battle of Hong Kong: The gunboat was scuttled at Hong Kong.
U-574	Kriegsmarine	World War II: The Type VIIC submarine was depth charged, rammed and sunk in the Atlantic Ocean (38°12′N 17°23′W) by HMS Stork (Royal Navy) with the loss of 22 of her 42 crew.
Varlaam Avanesov	Soviet Union	World War II: The tanker was torpedoed and sunk in the Aegean Sea 2.5 nautical miles (4.6 km; 2.9 mi) off Cape Babakele, Turkey (39°27′N 26°05′E) by U-652 (Kriegsmarine). Depending on the sources one crew member was lost or all survived.
HMS Watergate	Royal Navy	World War II: Battle of Hong Kong: The boom defence vessel was scuttled at Hong Kong.

== 20 December ==
List of shipwrecks: 20 December 1941
Ship	State	Description
HMCS Adversus	Royal Canadian Navy	The patrol vessel (155 GRT) ran aground on McNutts Island, Nova Scotia in a blizzard and was wrecked.
Emidio	United States	World War II: The 6,912 GRT tanker on a passage from Seattle for San Pedro in ballast, was shelled, torpedoed and damaged in the Pacific Ocean off Cape Mendocino, California by I-17 (Imperial Japanese Navy) with the loss of five crew. Survivors reached the Blunt's Reef Lightship and were rescued by USCGC Shawnee (United States Coast Guard). Emidio drifted 85 miles (137 km) to the north west and came ashore at Crescent City, California. The wreck was refloated, towed to Long Beach, California, and scrapped in 1969.
HMS Kandahar	Royal Navy	World War II: First Battle of Sirte: Damaged by a mine in the Mediterranean Sea off Sirte, Libya 73 of her crew were killed whilst attempting to assist the light cruiser HMS Neptune (Royal Navy), the K-class destroyer (1,690/2,330 t, 1939) was scuttled by the destroyer HMS Jaguar (Royal Navy).
Sumatra	United Kingdom	World War II: Battle of Hong Kong: The coastal tanker (984 GRT, 1894) was scuttled by shelling by HMS Cicala (Royal Navy) at Hong Kong to prevent capture. Raised, repaired and put in service as Sumatra Maru (Imperial Japanese Army).
Taishan	United Kingdom	World War II: The 3,174 GRT passenger-cargo ship was bombed and sunk in the Tathong Channel by Japanese aircraft.
Warrian	United Kingdom	The 1,048 GRT cargo ship on a voyage from Lagos for Port Harcourt with general cargo, collided with the French steamer Pierre Loti and sank at the entrance to Bonny River.

== 21 December ==
List of shipwrecks: 21 December 1941
Ship	State	Description
Annavore	Norway	World War II: Convoy HG 76: The cargo ship was torpedoed and sunk in the Atlantic Ocean (43°55′N 19°50′W) by U-567 (Kriegsmarine) with the loss of 34 of the 38 people on board.
HMS Audacity	Royal Navy	World War II: Convoy HG 76: The escort carrier was torpedoed sunk in the Atlantic Ocean 430 nautical miles (800 km; 490 mi) west of Cape Finisterre, Spain (43°45′N 19°54′W) by U-751 (Kriegsmarine). Survivors were rescued by HMS Convolvulus, HMS Marigold and HMS Pentstemon (all Royal Navy).
Benmacdhui	United Kingdom	World War II: The 6,869 GRT cargo ship on a trip from London and Immingham for Hong Kong with general cargo and explosives, struck a mine and sank in the North Sea 10 nautical miles (19 km) east-northeast of Spurn Head (53°40′N 0°30′E) with the loss of two of her 60 crew. The wreck was subsequently dispersed by explosives.
Cicala	Royal Navy	World War II: Battle of Hong Kong: The Insect-class gunboat was bombed and sunk at Hong Kong by Japanese aircraft with the loss of a crew member. Survivors were rescued by HMS MTB 10 (Royal Navy).
Dorothy Phillips	United States	World War II: The cargo ship was torpedoed by I-23 (Imperial Japanese Navy) and ran aground near Monterey Bay, California.
Emshörn	Germany	World War II: The cargo ship was torpedoed and sunk in the Barents Sea off Petsamo, Finland (70°04′N 30°32′E) by M-174 (Soviet Navy) with the loss of one life.
Hellen	Norway	World War II: The cargo ship was torpedoed and sunk in the Atlantic Ocean 4 nautical miles (7.4 km) off Cape Negro, Morocco (35°41′N 5°10′W) by U-573 (Kriegsmarine). Her 41 crew were rescued by HMT Arctic Ranger (Royal Navy).
HNLMS K XVII	Royal Netherlands Navy	World War II: The submarine was mined and sunk in the South China Sea off Tioman Island,(03°10′N 104°12′E).
Merton	United Kingdom	World War II: Convoy SC 58: The cargo ship (7,195 GRT) ran aground on the Pluckington Bank, in the River Mersey. She was on a voyage from Baltimore, Maryland, United States to Liverpool, Lancashire. Merton broke her back and was refloated in two halves. She was repaired at Birkenhead, Cheshire and returned to service.
Nauwai	Australia	The vessel was wrecked/burned in Broken Bay, off Pittwater, New South Wales.
U-451	Kriegsmarine	World War II: The Type VIIC submarine was torpedoed and sunk in the Atlantic Ocean off Cape Spartel, Morocco by Fairey Swordfish aircraft of 812 Squadron, Fleet Air Arm with the loss of 44 of her 45 crew. The survivor was rescued by HMS Myosotis (Royal Navy).
U-567	Kriegsmarine	World War II: The Type VIIC submarine was depth charged and sunk in the Atlantic Ocean (44°02′N 20°10′W) by HMS Deptford and HMS Samphire (both Royal Navy) with the loss of all 47 crew.

== 22 December ==
List of shipwrecks: 22 December 1941
Ship	State	Description
Aurigny	France	The interned cargo ship was damaged by fire at Buenos Aires, Argentina. She was subsequently repaired and entered Argentinian service as General San Martin.
Benno	Germany	World War II: The tanker was bombed and damaged in the Bay of Biscay by a Short Sunderland aircraft of 10 Squadron, Royal Australian Air Force. The next day, she was torpedoed and sunk at Cariño, Spain by Bristol Beaufort aircraft of 22 Squadron, Royal Air Force. A crew member was killed.
Cadamosto	Italy	World War II: The 1,010 GRT coaster on a passage from Tripoli for Benghazi in ballast, was sunk 8 nautical miles (15 km) north west of Misrata, Libya by a mine, most likely laid by the British submarine Rorqual.
Hayo Maru	Imperial Japanese Army	World War II: Operation "M" (Lingayen Bay Invasion): The requisitioned 5,446 GRT cargo ship anchored at Lingayen, was torpedoed by USS S-38 (United States Navy). The ship exploded, broke in two and sank in the Lingayen Gulf (16°37′N 120°17′E) with a loss of two of her crew.
Maria	Greece	World War II: The cargo schooner was shelled and sunk 5 1/2 nautical miles (10.2 km) from the Pylos Lighthouse by HMS Torbay (Royal Navy).
Spezia	Italy	World War II: The 1,825 GRT cargo ship on a passage from Tripoli for Benghazi struck a mine and sank in the Mediterranean Sea 14 nautical miles (26 km) northwest of Misrata (32°26′N 15°01′E).
Stylianos Chandris	Greece	World War II: Convoy SC 58: The cargo ship (6,059 GRT) on a trip from Montreal for Hull with a cargo of grain, struck a mine and sank in the North Sea off the mouth of the Humber (53°32′28″N 1°31′04″E). Her 30 crew were all rescued. The wreck was dispersed by explosives in 1950.
Tinos	Germany	World War II: The 2,826 GRT cargo ship was bombed and sunk as she was leaving Benghazi by Vickers Wellington bombers of Royal Air Force.

== 23 December ==
For the loss of the Italian coastal tanker Speranza on this day, see the entry for 30 November 1941.

List of shipwrecks: 23 December 1941
Ship	State	Description
HMT Fiskaren	Royal Navy	The naval drifter was sunk in a collision at Belfast, County Antrim.
Hie Maru	Imperial Japanese Army	World War II: Operation "B" (Invasion of British Borneo): The requisitioned 4,943 GRT cargo ship, anchored off Kuching, was torpedoed and sunk by HNLMS K XIV (Royal Netherlands Navy). Five of her crew were killed.
Hokkai Maru	Imperial Japanese Navy	World War II: Operation "B" (Invasion of British Borneo): The requisitioned 8,416 GRT cargo ship anchored at Kuching, was torpedoed and damaged by HNLMS K XIV (Royal Netherlands Navy) and subsequently beached to avoid sinking. She was refloated in September 1942, towed to Singapore, repaired there and returned to service in September 1943.
Katori Maru	Japan	World War II: Operation "B" (Invasion of British Borneo): The requisitioned 9,849 GRT ocean liner, anchored at Kuching, was torpedoed and sunk by HNLMS K XIV (Royal Netherlands Navy). Ten of her crew and many troops were killed.
Léopold II	Belgium	World War II: Convoy SC 58: The coaster (2,902 GRT) struck a mine and sank in the North Sea (52°53′48″N 2°05′20″E) with the loss of 35 of her 42 crew.
Montebello	United States	World War II: The tanker was torpedoed, shelled, and sunk in the Pacific Ocean 4 nautical miles (7.4 km) south of the Piedras Blancas Lighthouse, California (35°30′N 121°15′W) by I-21 (Imperial Japanese Navy). Her crew were rescued.
PB-32	Imperial Japanese Navy	World War II: Battle of Wake Island: The Momi-class destroyer was run aground on Wake Island (19°17′N 166°35′E) to land troops and was destroyed by 3-inch (76 mm) shore guns.
PB-33	Imperial Japanese Navy	World War II: Battle of Wake Island: The Momi-class destroyer was run aground on Wake Island (19°17′N 166°35′E) to land troops and was destroyed by 3-inch (76 mm) shore guns that killed two of her crew and wounded seven others.
Pelikan	Nazi Germany	World War II: The fishing trawler was shelled and sunk at Lofoten, Norway.
Rokos Vergottis	Greece	World War II: Convoy FS 679: The 5,637 GRT cargo ship on a voyage from Montreal for London with a cargo of grain, struck a mine in the North Sea off Cromer, Norfolk, United Kingdom. She was taken in tow but ran aground at 52°45′N 2°10′E and was abandoned. There were no casualties.
Shuntien	United Kingdom	World War II: Convoy TA 5: The passenger ship was torpedoed and sunk in the Mediterranean Sea 100 nautical miles (190 km; 120 mi) west of Alexandria, Egypt (32°06′N 24°46′E) by U-559 (Kriegsmarine) with the loss of at least 800 lives, mostly Italian and German prisoners of war. Many of the survivors were rescued by HMS Salvia and a few by HMS Heythrop (both Royal Navy), but HMS Salvia was sunk a few hours later with the loss of all aboard.
Soryu Maru	Japan	World War II: The cargo ship was torpedoed and sunk in the South China Sea off Badoc, Philippines by USS Seal (United States Navy).
Speranza	Italy	World War II: The 445 GRT coastal tanker, damaged during night air raid on 30 November, was scuttled with explosive charges at Benghazi, Libya.
Tiberio	United Kingdom	The 231 GRT motor schooner, captured from the Italians on 31 December 1940, foundered and capsized in heavy weather off Mersa Matruh whilst on a supply run, with a loss of one crew.
HMT Token	Royal Navy	The naval drifter/minesweeper ran aground in a storm in Skerry Sound, Scapa Flow and broke up.
U-79	Kriegsmarine	World War II: The Type VIIC submarine was depth charged and sunk in the Mediterranean Sea off Bardia, Libya (32°15′N 25°19′E) by HMS Hasty and HMS Hotspur (both Royal Navy). Forty-four crew were rescued.
Four unnamed vessels	Imperial Japanese Navy	World War II: British Borneo (Sarawak) Invasion Convoy: The Daihatsu-class landing craft were sunk during landings near the mouth of the Santubong River in Sarawak.

== 24 December ==
List of shipwrecks: 24 December 1941
Ship	State	Description
Absaroka	United States	Absaroka World War II: The lumber carrier was torpedoed and damaged in the Pacific Ocean off Point Fermin, California by I-19 (Imperial Japanese Navy). She was beached off Fort MacArthur. A crew member was killed by the shifting of her cargo.
Bratton	United Kingdom	World War II: The tanker struck a mine and sank in the North Sea off Great Yarmouth, Norfolk.
Dorothy Phillips	United States	World War II: The vessel's rudder was damaged by I-23 (Imperial Japanese Navy) and she ran aground at Monterey, California.
F 146	Kriegsmarine	World War II: The Type A Marinefährprahm was shelled, set on fire by artillery and beached at Bardia, Libya.
Forafric	United Kingdom	World War II: The cargo ship was bombed and sunk in the Celebes Sea south of the Philippines by Japanese aircraft.
Gladys	United Kingdom	World War II: The cargo ship was scuttled at Kuching, Sarawak.
HNLMS K XVI	Royal Netherlands Navy	World War II: The submarine was torpedoed and sunk in the South China Sea west of Kuching by I-66 (Imperial Japanese Navy).
Kim Chin Seng	United Kingdom	World War II: The lighter was scuttled at Kuching.
HMS LCA 121	Royal Navy	The landing craft assault was lost on this date.
Mambukai	United States	The harbor vessel was sunk in a collision in the harbour at Manila, Philippines.
Margaret	United Kingdom	World War II: The cargo ship was scuttled at Kuching.
Merchant	United Kingdom	World War II: The cargo ship struck a mine and was damaged in the North Sea off Great Yarmouth (52°39′30″N 2°00′56″E) with the loss of one of her 45 crew. Sighted by aircraft the next day, she probably sank shortly after.
Minsei Maru	Imperial Japanese Navy	The Minsei Maru-class minelayer ran aground at Nishinotoromisaki's White Bank, Karafuto three nautical miles (5.6 km; 3.5 mi) from Nishinotoromisaki Cape lighthouse in a snow storm. She was refloated on 30 December, arrived at Hakodate on 31 January 1942, and entered drydock for repair on 1 February 1942. Repairs were completed on 9 April 1942.
USS PT-33	United States Navy	World War II: The Elco 77-foot-class motor torpedo boat ran aground on a reef north west of Cape Santiago, Luzon. She was burnt to prevent capture on 26 December.
Phenix	United Kingdom	World War II: The tanker struck a mine and sank at Haifa, Palestine with the loss of four of her 33 crew. The wreck was refloated in June 1952 and scrapped.
Rejang	United Kingdom	World War II: The cargo ship was scuttled at Kuching.
USS Rochester	United States Navy	World War II: The hulk of the discarded ex-armored cruiser was scuttled as a blockship in Subic Bay to prevent capture by Japanese forces.
Sagiri	Imperial Japanese Navy	World War II: Invasion of British Borneo (Sarawak): Invasion Convoy: The Fubuki-class destroyer was torpedoed, her torpedoes caught fire and exploded, and was sunk in the South China Sea about 65 kilometres (40 mi) off Kuching by HNLMS K XVI (Royal Netherlands Navy) with the loss of 120 of her 241 crew. One hundred and twenty survivors were rescued by Shirakumo and W-3 (both Imperial Japanese Navy).
HMS Salvia	Royal Navy	World War II: Convoy TA 5: The Flower-class corvette was torpedoed and sunk in the Mediterranean Sea 100 nautical miles (190 km) west of Alexandria, Egypt (31°46′N 28°00′E) by U-568 (Kriegsmarine) with the loss of all 106 crew, and all the survivors rescued from Shuntien (United Kingdom).
Si Kiang	United States	World War II: The cargo ship was bombed and sunk in the harbor of Mariveles, Philippines by Japanese aircraft with the loss of eight of her crew and two United States Marines.
Stanmount	United Kingdom	World War II: The tanker struck a mine and sank in the North Sea off Great Yarmouth (52°39′22″N 2°00′31″E). Her 41 crew were rescued.

== 25 December ==
List of shipwrecks: 25 December 1941
Ship	State	Description
USS Banaag	United States Navy	World War II: The yard tug was lost by enemy action, probably in the Philippines.
Chengtu	United Kingdom	World War II: The cargo liner was scuttled at Hong Kong to prevent capture. She was raised, repaired and put in Japanese service as Sito Maru in 1942.
Churruca	Philippines	World War II: The cargo ship was scuttled at Hong Kong.
Cormead	United Kingdom	World War II: The collier struck a mine in the North Sea off Lowestoft, Suffolk. She was taken in tow by a Royal Navy tug but sank the next day. Her crew were rescued.
Eldorado	Panama	World War II: The cargo ship was scuttled at Hong Kong. She was raised, repaired, and taken into Japanese service as Gyoryu Maru.
Empire Dragon	United Kingdom	World War II: The incomplete cargo ship was launched and sunk at Hong Kong. She was raised, finished and put into Japanese service.
Empire Pagoda	United Kingdom	World War II: The incomplete cargo ship was launched and sunk at Hong Kong. She was raised, finished and put into Japanese service.
Haraldsvang	Norway	World War II: The cargo ship was scuttled at Hong Kong. She was raised, repaired, put into Japanese service as Toryu Maru.
Hinsang	United Kingdom	World War II: The cargo ship was scuttled at Hong Kong. She was raised, repaired and put into Japanese service as Kensei Maru.
Kanchow	United Kingdom	World War II: The cargo ship was scuttled at Taikoo Dock, Hong Kong. She was raised, repaired and put into Japanese service as Gyoshin Maru, later renamed Kanshu Maru.
Ming Sang	United Kingdom	World War II: The cargo ship was scuttled at Hong Kong. She was raised, repaired and put into Japanese service as Bisan Maru.
HMS MTB 7, HMS MTB 9, HMS MTB 10, and HMS MTB 11	Royal Navy	World War II: The BPB 60-foot-class motor torpedo boats were scuttled in Mirs Bay, Hong Kong.
HMS MTB 27	Royal Navy	World War II: The Thornycroft 55-foot-class motor torpedo boat was scuttled in Mirs Bay.
Ningpo	Sweden	World War II: The cargo ship was shelled and sunk at Hong Kong by Imperial Japanese Navy warships. She was raised, repaired and put into Japanese service in 1942 as Nippo Maru.
P. G. Halvorsen	Norway	World War II: The cargo ship struck a mine and sank in the Great Belt off the coast of Denmark.
HMS Robin	Royal Navy	World War II: The boom defence depot ship, a former Heron-class gunboat, was scuttled at Hong Kong.
USS Sealion	United States Navy	World War II: The Sargo-class submarine was scuttled at Cavite Navy Yard, Manila, Philippines, due to bomb damage she suffered in an attack by Imperial Japanese Navy aircraft on 10 December. She was raised in November 1945 and scrapped.
Shantung	Sweden	World War II: Convoy HX 165: The cargo ship aught fire in the Atlantic Ocean (59°50′N 23°30′W). She was subsequently scuttled by shellfire on 2 January 1942 at 62°28′N 18°30′W.
Shrivati	India	World War II: The cargo ship was scuttled at Hong Kong to prevent capture.
HMS Thracian	Royal Navy	World War II: The S-class destroyer was bombed and damaged at Hong Kong by Japanese aircraft and was beached. She was subsequently salvaged by the Japanese and entered service in 1942 as Patrol Boat No. 101.

== 26 December ==
List of shipwrecks: 26 December 1941
Ship	State	Description
CKA-034^{[Note 4]}	Soviet Navy	World War II: The MO-4-class patrol vessel was shelled and sunk by coastal artillery off Reed-Burun.
Fanagoria	Soviet Union	World War II: The tug was bombed and sunk by Luftwaffe aircraft during a landing operation with the loss of 100 troops and crew.
HMT Henriette	Royal Navy	World War II: The naval trawler struck a mine and sank in the North Sea 3.4 nautical miles (6.3 km; 3.9 mi) off Spurn Head, Yorkshire. There were no casualties.
Kong Ring	Norway	World War II: The cargo liner struck a mine and sank in the Ullsfjorden, Norway. Thirty of her 38 crew, and 257 of the 300 German soldiers she was carrying at the time of her loss were killed.
Maikop	Soviet Union	World War II: The tanker was bombed and sunk in the Gulf of Davao by Japanese aircraft. A crew member was killed.
Nancy Moran	United States	The tug was rammed and sunk 18 miles (29 km) off Port Everglades, Florida by USS PC-451 (United States Navy).
Paz	United States	World War II: The cargo ship (4,260 GRT, 1914) was bombed and sunk at Manila, Philippines by Japanese aircraft. She was later salvaged, repaired and entered Japanese service as Hatsu Maru.
Tantalus	United Kingdom	World War II: The cargo ship was bombed and sunk at Manila by Imperial Japanese Navy aircraft. Her 45 crew were later taken as prisoners of war.
Unyo Maru No. 2	Imperial Japanese Navy	World War II: Invasion of British Borneo (Sarawak): Invasion Convoy: The Unyo Maru No. 2-class auxiliary transport was bombed and sunk in the South China Sea off Kuching, Sarawak by Martin B-10 bomber aircraft of the Royal Netherlands Army. Eight of her crew were killed.
V 5904 Geier	Kriegsmarine	World War II: The vorpostenboot was shelled and sunk off Lofoten, Norway by HMS Ashanti (Royal Navy).
Voroshilov	Soviet Union	World War II: The dredger was bombed and sunk at Kerch by Luftwaffe aircraft with the loss of about 450 troops of the 51st Army. Two hundred people were rescued.
W-6	Imperial Japanese Navy	World War II: Invasion of British Borneo (Sarawak): Invasion Convoy: The W-5-class minesweeper was bombed and sunk in the South China Sea off Kuching (01°34′N 110°21′E) by Martin B-10 bomber aircraft of the Royal Netherlands Army. Survivors were rescued by W-3 (Imperial Japanese Navy).
Warszawa	Poland	World War II: The cargo liner was torpedoed and damaged in the Mediterranean Sea (32°11′N 24°44′E) by U-559 (Kriegsmarine) with the loss of 23 of the 468 people on board. Survivors were rescued by HMS Avon Vale, HMS Burgonet and HMS Peony (all Royal Navy). Warszawa was taken in tow by HMS Peony but was later torpedoed and sunk at 32°10′N 24°32′E by U-552 (Kriegsmarine).

== 27 December ==
List of shipwrecks: 27 December 1941
Ship	State	Description
Anhalt	Germany	World War II: Operation Archery: The cargo ship was shelled and sunk at Måløy Island, Norway by HMS Chiddingfold and HMS Offa (both Royal Navy).
Anita L. M. Russ	Germany	World War II: Operation Archery: The cargo ship was shelled and sunk at Måløy Island by HMS Onslow and HMS Oribi (both Royal Navy). She was raised in June 1951 and repaired. The vessel was re-engined with diesel engines, and returned to service as Island.
Arayat	Philippines	World War II: The Philippines government revenue/customs cutter was bombed and sunk by Japanese aircraft. She was raised, repaired, put into service as PB-105.
Bohol	United States	World War II: The cargo liner was scuttled at Manila, Philippines.
Canlaon	United States	World War II: The lighthouse tender was bombed and sunk in the Pasig River at Manila by Japanese aircraft.
V 5102 Donner	Kriegsmarine	World War II: Operation Archery: The vorpostenboot was shelled and sunk at Vågsøy by HMS Chiddingfold and HMS Offa (both Royal Navy).
V 6114 Eismeer	Kriegsmarine	World War II: Operation Archery: The vorpostenboot was shelled and sunk by HMS Onslow and HMS Oribi (both Royal Navy). She was salvaged in 1942, repaired and returned to service as a fish transport in 1944.
Ethel Edwards	United States	World War II: The coaster was bombed and sunk at Manila by Japanese aircraft.
V 5108 Föhn	Kriegsmarine	World War II: Operation Archery: The vorpostenboot was shelled and sunk by HMS Oribi (Royal Navy). Sixteen of her twenty crew were taken as prisoners of war. The wreck was raised and scrapped in October 1942.
J. B. Paddon	United Kingdom	World War II: The collier was bombed and sunk in the North Sea (53°55′N 0°16′E) by Luftwaffe aircraft. Her crew were rescued.
T-491 Kiziltash	Soviet Navy	World War II: The auxiliary minesweeper was damaged by Luftwaffe aircraft and was beached at Kuchugury, on the Kerch Peninsula.
M-557	Kriegsmarine	The Type 1915 minesweeper disappeared northeast of Rügen in a snowstorm, possibly sunk by a mine. All 85 crew were lost.
Nojima	Japan	World War II: The Muroto-class collier was torpedoed, having her bow blown off, in the South China Sea 30 nautical miles (56 km; 35 mi) southwest of Hong Kong by USS Perch (United States Navy). The vessel was stranded in Hunghai Bay. Nojima was refloated in late January 1942 and arrived at Hong Kong on 29 January for repairs.
Norma	Germany	World War II: Operation Archery: The cargo ship was shelled and sunk at Måløy Island by HMS Onslow and HMS Oribi (both Royal Navy).
Penay	Soviet Union	World War II: The troopship was bombed and sunk by Luftwaffe aircraft with the loss of 113 lives.
Reimar Edward Fritzen	Germany	World War II: Operation Archery: The cargo ship was shelled and sunk at Måløy Island by HMS Onslow and HMS Oribi (both Royal Navy).
Starbeam	United Kingdom	World War II: The cargo ship was abandoned off Hornsea, Yorkshire (53°55′N 00°16′E) in a sinking condition after being damaged by Luftwaffe aircraft.
T-492	Soviet Navy	The auxiliary minesweeper sank on this date.
Taurus	United States	World War II: The cargo ship was bombed by Japanese aircraft and scuttled in the Pasig River, Philippines.
No. 85, and No. 105	Soviet Navy	The G-5-class motor torpedo boats were lost on this date.

== 28 December ==
List of shipwrecks: 28 December 1941
Ship	State	Description
Banahao	United States	World War II: The lighthouse tender was bombed and sunk at Manila, Philippines, by Japanese aircraft. She was later raised by the Imperial Japanese Army.
Connecticut	United States	World War II: The tanker was torpedoed in the Pacific Ocean near Cape Disappointment, Washington by I-25 (Imperial Japanese Navy) and ran aground. She was later salvaged.
DCH-1	United States Navy	The damage control training ship, a former Wickes-class destroyer, was scuttled in the Pacific Ocean (26°35′N 143°49′W) by USS Neches (United States Navy) while being towed from San Diego, California to Pearl Harbor, Hawaii.
De Ruyter	Netherlands	World War II: The coaster was bombed and damaged in the North Sea 23 nautical miles (43 km; 26 mi) north north east of the South Bishop Lightship ( Trinity House) by Luftwaffe aircraft. She was beached on the Goodwin Sands, Kent.
Hai Kwang	United Kingdom	World War II: The coaster was bombed and sunk in Manila Bay by Japanese aircraft. Her crew were taken as prisoners of war.
Kaiping	United Kingdom	World War II: The cargo ship was bombed and sunk at Manila by Japanese aircraft. She was later salvaged, repaired and entered Japanese service as Kaihan Maru.
NMS Locotenent Stoicescu	Royal Romanian Navy	The auxiliary patrol ship was lost in the Black Sea. Depending on sources, it disappeared in a storm or was sunk by a mine.
Mauban	Philippines	World War II: The cargo ship was bombed and sunk at Manila by Japanese aircraft. She was later salvaged, repaired and entered Japanese service as Manbo Maru.
Panay	Philippines	World War II: The United States Army-chartered cargo ship was sunk by Japanese aircraft in Campomanes Bay off Sipalay (09°41′N 122°24′E).
Research	United States	World War II: The survey vessel was bombed and damaged in Manila Bay by Japanese aircraft. She was bombed again on each of the next two days and was beached.
Seistan	United Kingdom	World War II: The cargo shipas bombed and sunk in Manila Bay by Japanese aircraft. Her crew were later taken as prisoners of war.
Shinai	Canada	World War II: The cargo ship was scuttled at Kuching, Sarawak. She was refloated in 1942, repaired and entered Japanese service as Shinai Maru.
T-485 Kakhovka	Soviet Navy	World War II: The auxiliary minesweeper was sunk by German artillery off Kerch (45°16′N 36°26′E).
U-75	Kriegsmarine	World War II: The Type VIIC submarine was depth charged and sunk in the Mediterranean Sea (31°30′N 26°40′E) by HMS Kipling (Royal Navy) with the loss of fifteen of her 45 crew. Survivors were rescued by HMS Kipling and HMS Legion (both Royal Navy).
Volo	United Kingdom	World War II: Convoy ME 8: The cargo ship was torpedoed and sunk in the Mediterranean Sea (31°45′N 26°48′E) by U-75 (Kriegsmarine) with the loss of 24 of her 38 crew. Survivors were rescued by HMS LCT 11 (Royal Navy).
No. 24	Soviet Navy	The G-5-class motor torpedo boat was lost on this date.

== 29 December ==
List of shipwrecks: 29 December 1941
Ship	State	Description
Aloha	Philippines	World War II: The cargo ship was scuttled in the Philippines.
BRP Banahaw	Philippine Navy	World War II: The presidential yacht was bombed and sunk at Fort Mills, Corregidor Island by Japanese aircraft.
Bicol	Philippines	World War II: The cargo ship was scuttled in the Philippines.
CKA-056^{[Note 4]}	Soviet Navy	World War II: The MO-4-class patrol vessel was shelled and sunk at Feodosiya by mortar and artillery fire.
CKA-068	Soviet Navy	The MO-4-class patrol vessel was sunk by mortar and artillery fire near Feodosiya.
Eisk	Soviet Union	World War II: The passenger ship was shelled and sunk off Kerch by German shore-based artillery with the loss of seven crew and a number of soldiers.
Palawan	Philippines	World War II: The coaster was scuttled at Manila, the Philippines. She was later salvaged, repaired and entered Japanese service as Paran Maru.
Ro-60	Imperial Japanese Navy	The Ro-60-class submarine ran aground on the Kwajalein Reef, Marshall Islands (09°00′N 167°30′E) and was wrecked. Her 60 crew were rescued by Jingei (Imperial Japanese Navy).
Samal	Philippines	World War II: The cargo ship was bombed and sunk by Japanese aircraft at Pier 7, Manila.
No. 063	Soviet Navy	The K-193 Type ZK patrol boat was lost on this date.

== 30 December ==
List of shipwrecks: 30 December 1941
Ship	State	Description
Campina	Romania	World War II: The 3,032 GRT tanker travelling in a convoy from Patras for Taranto in ballast, was torpedoed and sunk in the Ionian Sea (38°37′N 20°28′E) by HMS Thorn (Royal Navy). A crew member was killed and some were wounded.
Città Di Marsala	Italy	World War II: The 2,480 GRT cargo ship travelling from Argostoli for Navarino and Patras with supplies, was torpedoed and damaged in the Aegean Sea 10 nautical miles (19 km) southwest of Argostoli (38°02′N 20°22′E) by HMS Proteus (Royal Navy). She was towed and beached at Argostoli to prevent sinking. Repaired and returned to service in 1948 as Citta Di Trapani.
HMS Kudat	Royal Navy	World War II: The transport/depot ship was bombed and sunk in the Klang Straits off Port Swettenham, Malaya by Japanese aircraft with the loss of three of her crew.
Porto Santo	Cuba	The cargo ship ran aground and was wrecked on Confites Cay.
R-2 Salvatore lo Bianco	Regia Marina	The 82 GRT auxiliary minesweeper was shelled and heavily damaged by British artillery at Bardia, Libya. She was subsequently beached to avoid sinking, but abandoned due to sustained damage.
SKA-063^{[Note 4]}	Soviet Navy	World War II: The MO-class patrol vessel was shelled and sunk off the Kerch Peninsula by shore-based artillery. All aboard were rescued by the cruiser Krasny Krym (Soviet Navy).
Tashkent	Soviet Union	World War II: The cargo ship was sunk in an air raid at Feodosia. She was raised in 1944.

== 31 December ==
List of shipwrecks: 31 December 1941
Ship	State	Description
Bagnoli	Italy	World War II: The requisitioned 246 GRT steam tug on a passage from Navarino to Argostoli, struck a mine just outside Navarino. She managed to turn around, but soon sank at Navarino roadstead.
Cardita	United Kingdom	World War II: Convoy HX 166: The tanker straggled behind the convoy. She was torpedoed and damaged in the Atlantic Ocean by U-87 (Kriegsmarine) with the loss of 27 of her 50 crew. She was abandoned on 3 January 1942 at (59°18′N 12°50′W) sinking later that day. Her master, sixteen crewmen and six gunners were rescued by HMS Onslow (Royal Navy). Ten of her crew were rescued by HMS Sabre (Royal Navy).
CKA-094^{[Note 4]}	Soviet Navy	World War II: The MO-4-class patrol vessel was bombed and sunk in the Strait of Kerch by Luftwaffe aircraft.
Dos Hermanos	United States	World War II: The cargo ship was scuttled at Manila, Philippines. She was later raised, repaired and entered Japanese service as Himeno Maru.
Krasnogvardeets	Soviet Union	World War II: The cargo ship was bombed and sunk at Feodosiya by Luftwaffe aircraft. Her crew survived.
Magallanes	Philippines	World War II: The cargo ship was scuttled at Manila.
HMS Minnie Moller	Royal Navy	The tug/auxiliary minesweeper was lost on this date.
Montanes	Philippines	World War II: The cargo ship was scuttled at Manila.
Palawan	Philippines	World war II: The cargo ship was scuttled off Manila Bay to prevent capture.
Ruth Alexander	Panama	World War II: The cargo ship was bombed and damaged off Balikpapan, Netherlands East Indies by Imperial Japanese Navy aircraft with the loss of a crew member. The other 48 crew were rescued by a Dutch Dornier 24 aircraft. Ruth Alexander sank on 2 January 1942.
No. 023	Soviet Navy	The MO-4-class patrol vessel (50/56 t, 1940) was lost on this date.
Unnamed	Philippines	World War II: A lighter belonging to Luzon Stevedoring Co. was scuttled via capsizing in Manila Bay by the United States Navy.

== Unknown date ==
List of shipwrecks: Unknown date 1941
Ship	State	Description
Anlee	China	World War II: The cargo ship was scuttled at Hong Kong.
Apoey	United Kingdom	World War II: The cargo ship was scuttled or sunk at Hong Kong. She was salvaged by the Japanese sometime in 1942–43, repaired and put in Imperial Japanese Army service as Gyoei Maru.
Argus	United States	World War II: The cargo ship was scuttled at Hong Kong.
Cambay Prince	United Kingdom	World War II: The cargo ship was scuttled at Hong Kong.
Cyclope	French Navy	The tug sank at Bizerta, Tunisia.
Djebel Sannin	(France) Vichy French Navy	The minesweeping tug was lost sometime in December.
Ethel Moller	United Kingdom	World War II: The salvage tug was scuttled at Hong Kong. She was raised, repaired and put into Japanese service as Gyoun Maru.
Fausang	United Kingdom	World War II: The cargo ship was scuttled at Hong Kong. She was raised, repaired and put into Japanese service as Fusei Maru.
Frosty Moller	United Kingdom	World War II: The salvage tug was scuttled at Hong Kong.
Fook On	United Kingdom	World War II: The coaster was scuttled at Hong Kong.
Gertrude Moller	United Kingdom	World War II: The salvage tug was scuttled at Hong Kong.
HMS H31	Royal Navy	The H-class submarine was probably mined after leaving port on 19 December. She failed to respond on 24 December 1941.
Hirondelle	United States	World War II: The cargo ship was scuttled at Hong Kong.
Hsin Lee	China	World War II: The cargo ship was scuttled at Hong Kong.
I-41	Soviet Navy	The KM-2 type motor launch was lost sometime in December.
Josephine Moller	United Kingdom	World War II: The salvage ship was scuttled at Hong Kong. She was raised, repaired and put into Japanese service as Sagami Maru.
Kathleen Moller	United Kingdom	World War II: The cargo ship was scuttled at Hong Kong.
Kau Tung	United Kingdom	World War II: The cargo ship was scuttled at Hong Kong.
HMS LCP(L) 193 and HMS LCP(L) 194	Royal Navy	The Landing Craft Personnel (Large) were lost sometime in December.
Man Chiao	United Kingdom	World War II: The ferry was scuttled at Hong Kong.
Man Yeung	Royal Navy	World War II: The auxiliary minelayer was scuttled at Hong Kong.
Mao Lee	Royal Navy	World War II: The mine carrier was scuttled at Hong Kong.
Margaret Moller	United Kingdom	World War II: The salvage tug was scuttled at Hong Kong.
Marion	Panama	World War II: The cargo ship was scuttled at Hong Kong.
MMS 95, MMS 96, MMS 123, and MMS 124	United Kingdom	World War II: The incomplete MMS-class minesweepers were destroyed on the stocks at Vaughn Shipbuilding, or Bailey, Hong Kong between 8 and 25 December.
Nereus	Canada	The Proteus-class collier was lost in the Atlantic Ocean sometime after 10 December.
O 22 S	Kriegsmarine	The tug sank. She was subsequently salvaged, repaired and returned to service.
Patricia Moller	United Kingdom	World War II: The tug was scuttled at Hong Kong.
Q-116, Q-117, Q-118, Q-119, and two unnamed vessels	Philippine Army / United States Army	World War II: The incomplete Thornycroft65-foot-class motor torpedo boats were bombed and destroyed on the stocks at Cavite Navy Yard, Manila, Philippines.
Ranger	Philippines.	The tug was sunk at Manila by Japanese forces.
Sheng Lee	China	World War II: The cargo ship was scuttled at Hong Kong. She was salvaged by the Japanese and returned to service as Shori Maru.
Shun Chih	United Kingdom	World War II: The cargo ship was scuttled at Hong Kong.
St. Vincent de Paul	United Kingdom	World War II: The cargo ship was scuttled at Hong Kong. She was raised, repaired and put in Japanese service as Kyuryu Maru.
Tai Hing	United Kingdom	World War II: The cargo ship was scuttled at Hong Kong.
Tai Lee	United Kingdom	World War II: The cargo ship was scuttled at Hong Kong.
Tai Ming	United Kingdom	World War II: The coaster was scuttled at Hong Kong.
Tai Poo Sek	France	World War II: The cargo ship was scuttled at Hong Kong.
Tin Sang	United Kingdom	World War II: The coaster was scuttled at Hong Kong.
Tin Yat	United Kingdom	World War II: The coaster was scuttled at Hong Kong.
V 5907 Geier	Kriegsmarine	World War II: The vorpostenboot was shelled and sunk by HMS Ashanti (Royal Navy) off Lofoten, Norway on the 16 or 26 December.
Vizcaya	United States	World War II: The ship was scuttled in the Philippines.
Wave	United Kingdom	World War II: The water carrier was scuttled at Hong Kong.
USS YAG-2	United States Navy	World War II: The auxiliary net tender was probably bombed and sunk by the Japanese at the Cavite Navy Yard. She was raised, repaired and put into Japanese service as Yamashiro Maru.
USS YAG-3	United States Navy	World War II: The auxiliary minesweeper was probably bombed and sunk by the Japanese at the Cavite Navy Yard.
Yat Shing	United Kingdom	World War II: The cargo ship was scuttled at Hong Kong. She was raised, repaired and put into Japanese service as Nissho Maru.
Yung Ning	United Kingdom	World War II: The cargo ship was sunk at Canton, China.

== Notes ==
1. Force K comprised HMS Aurora, HMS Lance, HMS Lively and HMS Penelope (all Royal Navy).
2. The 4th Destroyer Flotilla comprised HMS Legion, HMS Maori, HMS Sikh (all Royal Navy) and HNLMS Isaac Sweers (Royal Netherlands Navy).
3. The 36th Escort Group comprised HMS Convolvulus, HMS Deptford, HMS Gardenia, HMS Marigold, HMS Pentstemon, HMS Rhodedendron, HMS Samphire, HMS Stork and HMS Vetch (all Royal Navy)
4. CKA are the Cyrillic letters. The English translation would be SKA.
5. Luzon may have been sunk in early January 1942.
