= USS YAG-2 =

Auxiliary ship of the United States Navy

History

United States Navy
- Name: YAG-2
- Builder: South China Shipbuilding and Repair Works Ltd., Hong Kong
- Launched: 1931
- Acquired: acquired by the U.S. Navy, 19 June 1941
- Stricken: 22 February 1943
- Honours and awards: 1 Battle Stars; American Defense Service Medal; Asiatic-Pacific Campaign Medal; World War II Victory Medal; Philippine Defense Medal
- Fate: Sunk by aircraft, 10 December 1941; re-floated and commissioned as an Imperial Japanese Army transport

History

Empire of Japan
- Name: Yamashiro Maru
- Commissioned: 1942/1943
- Fate: unknown

General characteristics
- Tonnage: 288 gross register tons
- Length: 128.4 ft (39.1 m) o/a
- Beam: 25.6 ft (7.8 m)
- Draught: 7.6 ft (2.3 m)
- Installed power: 220 bhp
- Propulsion: two Deutz 6-cylinder diesel engines

The USS YAG-2 (ex-Hoi Kong, ex-Robert O., later Yamashiro Maru) was a miscellaneous auxiliary service craft of the United States Navy that served during World War II.

== History ==
She was built in by the South China Shipbuilding and Repair Works Ltd. in Hong Kong and launched in 1931 as the Hoi Kong. She was steel-hulled. In 1934, she was acquired by the North Negros Sugar Company in Manapla, Philippines and renamed Robert O. On 19 June 1941, the United States Navy purchased her from the North Negros Sugar Company and designated her as a Miscellaneous Auxiliary Service Craft (YAG). She was assigned to the Cavite Navy Yard, 16th Naval District. On 25 October 1941, she began a conversion to a net tender which was expected to be completed by 15 December 1941. Prior to her completion, she was attacked and destroyed by enemy aircraft during the Japanese attack on Cavite Navy Yard on 10 December 1941. She was officially listed as lost on 2 January 1942 - the date of the Japanese occupation of Manila - and struck from the Naval List on 22 February 1943. In 1942 or 1943, she was salvaged by the Japanese, renamed the Yamashiro Maru (registration 2213), and commissioned as an Imperial Japanese Army transport. Her ultimate fate is unknown.

She was awarded one battle star.
