= YFD-2 =

United States Navy drydock

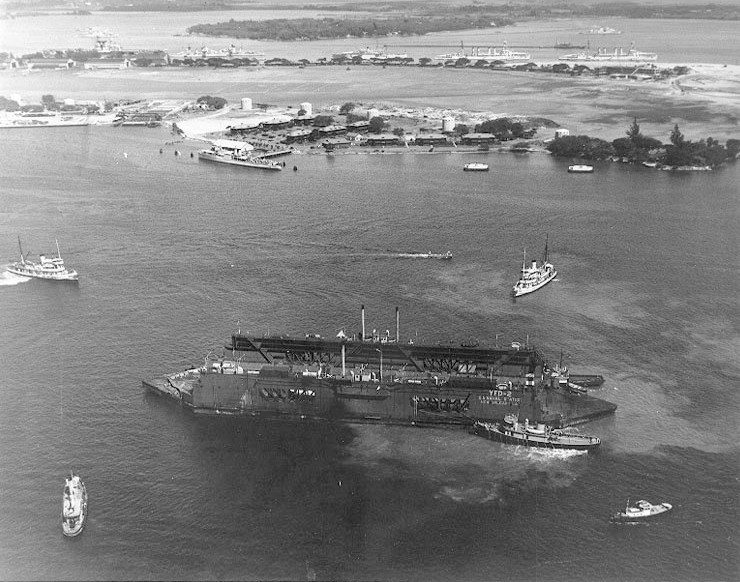
- YFD-2 arriving Pearl Harbor Oct 1940

History

United States
- Name: USS YFD-2 (nickname: Old New Orleans)
- Namesake: New Orleans
- Builder: Maryland Steel Co.
- Laid down: early 1901
- Launched: 1901
- Commissioned: 6 November 1901
- Honors and awards: Combat Action Ribbon, American Defense Service Medal, American Campaign Medal, Asiatic-Pacific Campaign Medal, World War II Victory Medal
- Fate: unknown - Struck from the Naval Register, 28 January 1947

General characteristics
- Displacement: 16,000 tons
- Length: About 375 ft (114 m)
- Beam: 128 ft (39 m)
- Armament: none
- Notes: First Yard Floating Dock, 18,000 tons lifting capacity.

YFD-2 (Yard Floating Dock-2, USS YFD-2) was an auxiliary floating drydock built for the United States Navy in 1901. The first parts were laid down in early 1901 at Maryland Steel Co. of Sparrows Point, Maryland. YFD-2 was the first of its kind, steel movable auxiliary floating drydock, used to raise large ships out the water for repair below the ship's waterline. YFD-2 had an 18,000 tons lifting capacity.

== New Orleans Navy Yard ==
YFD-2 was towed to her station in the Navy Yard near New Orleans at Algiers, New Orleans, Louisiana on 6 November 1901. It took four steam tugboats: the Orion, Taurus, Peerless, and Volunteer to tow YFD-2 from Maryland to New Orleans. YFD-2 was a new state of the art machine for its time. USS Stranger with the Louisiana governor, William Wright Heard and the New Orleans mayor, Paul Capdevielle where there to greet the arrival. A New Orleans parade was held to celebrate the arrival. The first United States Navy ship repaired was the 11,565-ton battleship USS Illinois, a pre-dreadnought battleship in January 1902. Next YFD-2 repaired the 300-foot (91 m) long transfer boat Carrier. In 1903 she repaired the Norwegian cargo ship Telefon. YFD-2 remained in New Orleans until towed to Pearl Harbor, Territory of Hawaii. The dock arrived in Pearl Harbor on 23 August 1940, before World War II. She departed New Orleans on 19 March 1940 after modification to make her sea worthy for the 6,000-mile (9,700 km) travel. To go through the Panama Canal she was taken apart at Cristóbal, Colón, the Canal was only 100 feet (30 m) wide at that time and the 128-foot (39 m) wide drydock would not pass. The sections were towed through the Canal and reassembled at Balboa, Panama.

== Attack on Pearl Harbor ==
YFD-2 was repairing the destroyer USS Shaw on 7 December 1941 during the attack on the harbor. YFD-2 and Shaw were hit and damaged in the attack by Japanese dive bombers. Shaw also damaged YFD-2 with the explosion of her forward ammunition magazines stores. Both ships were repaired and put back in service. On 9 January 1942 YFD-2 had the water pumped out of her pontoon tanks and was raised for repair. When the repairs were completed she was put back in service in May 1942. The Pacific Bridge Company was give charge for the repairs of YFD-2. Divers had to repair more than 200 holes in YFD-2 to float her again. Repaired, the YFD-2 raised the USS Shaw for 10 days of repairs to install a new temporary bow so Shaw could return to the naval shipyard at Mare Island at Vallejo, California for final repairs. YFD-2 was used for salvaging and repairing many of ships damaged on 7 December 1941, as she could raise any ship here, other than the large new battleships.

She continued repair work throughout World War II at Pearl Harbor. After the war YFD-2 was struck from the Naval Register on 28 January 1947. She was sold on 30 March 1948 for private use.

== Image gallery ==
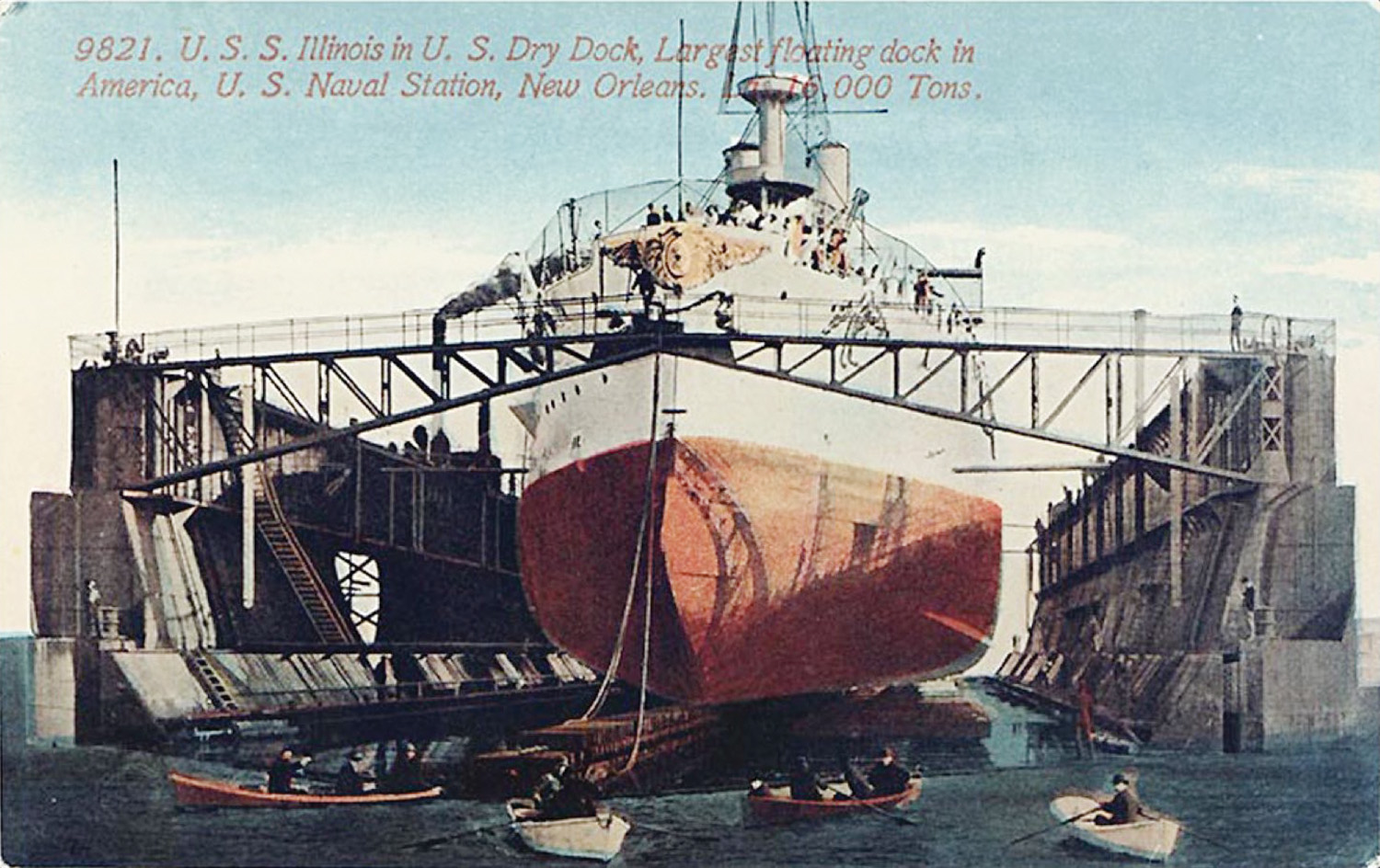
Yard Floating Dock-2 with battleship USS Illinois, a pre-dreadnought battleship in January 1902 for repair

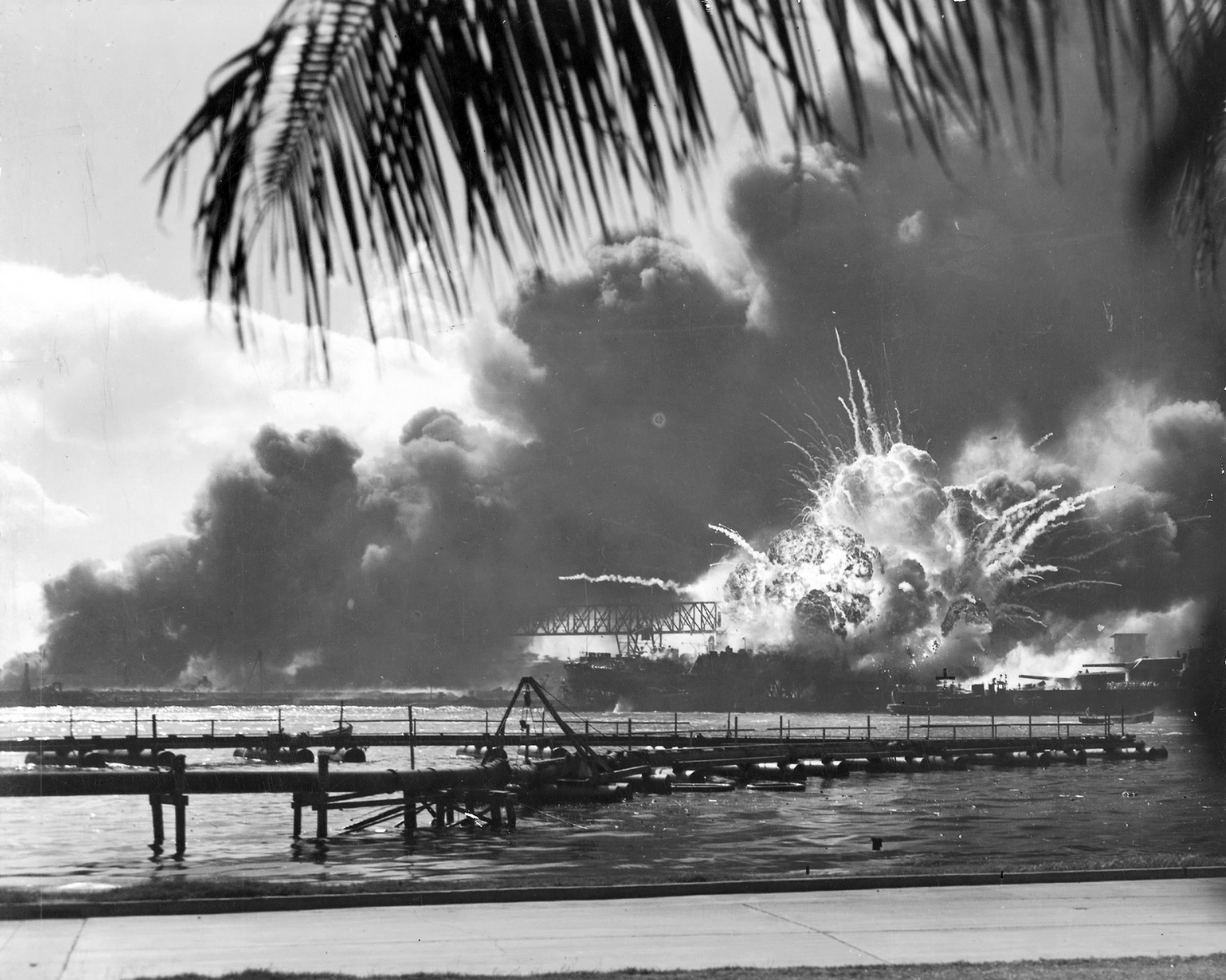
USS Shaw exploding after her forward magazine was detonated by the raging fire

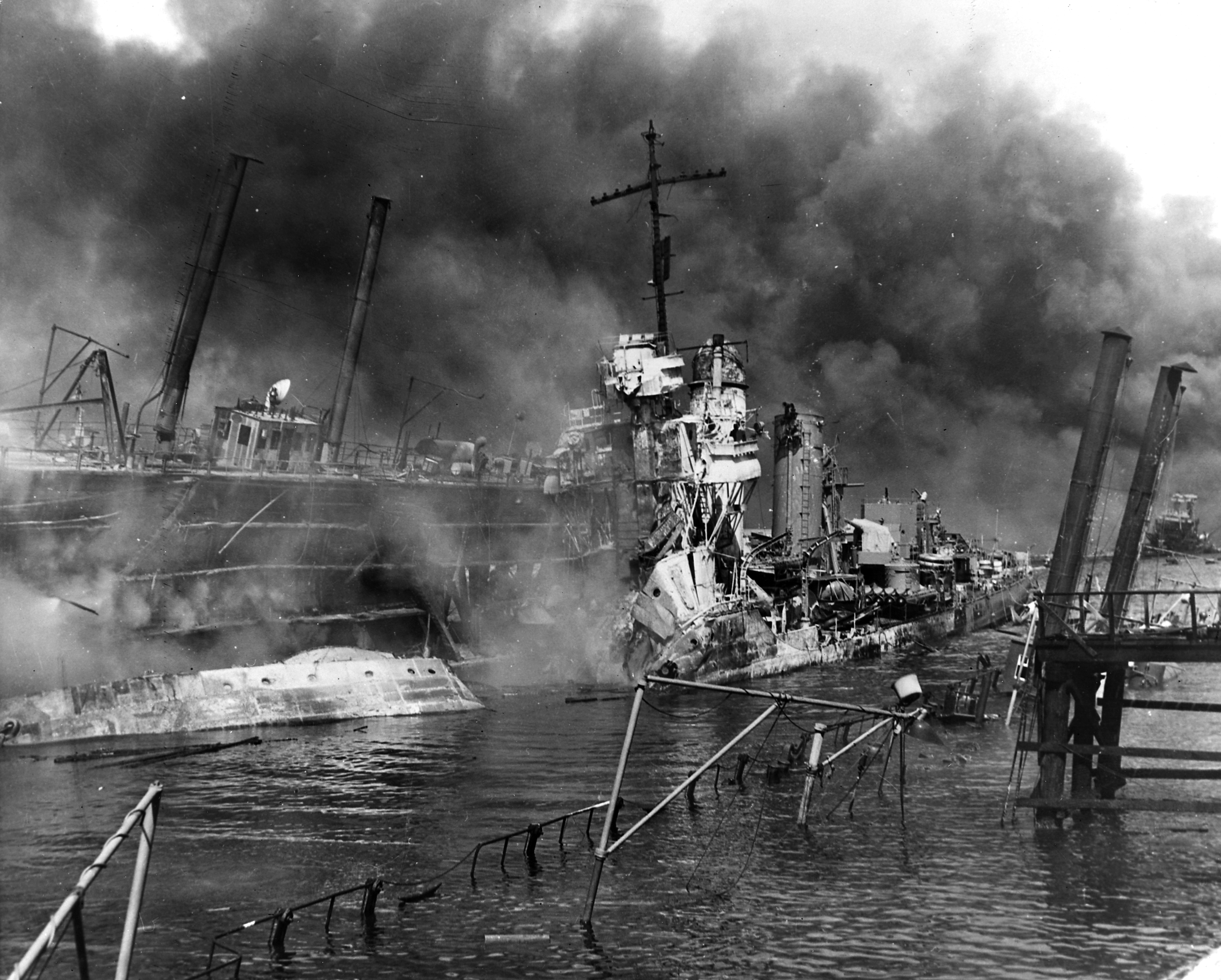
Wreckage of bombed YFD-2 and Shaw at Pearl Harbor

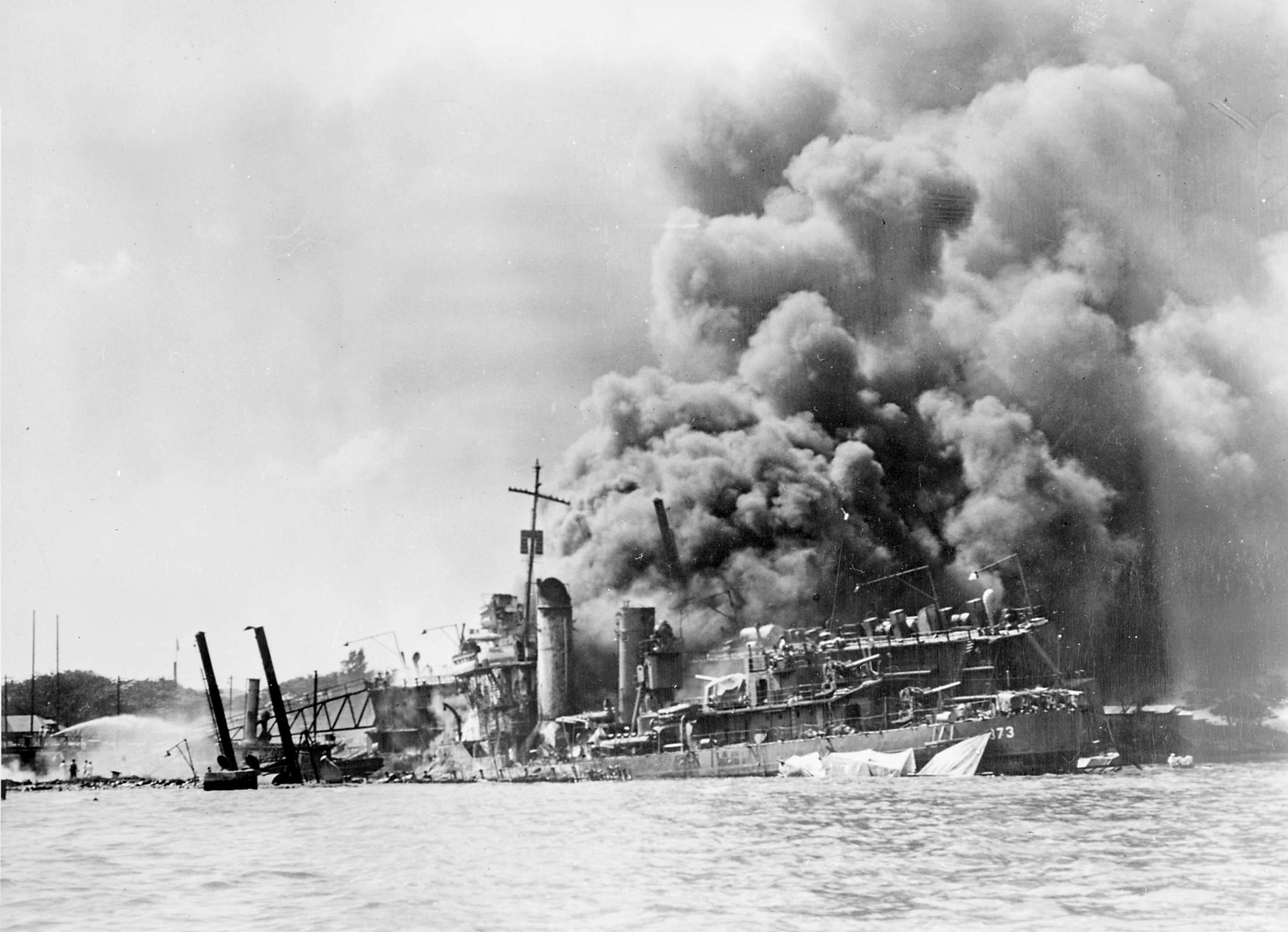
USS Shaw in half-sunken YFD-2 at Pearl Harbor

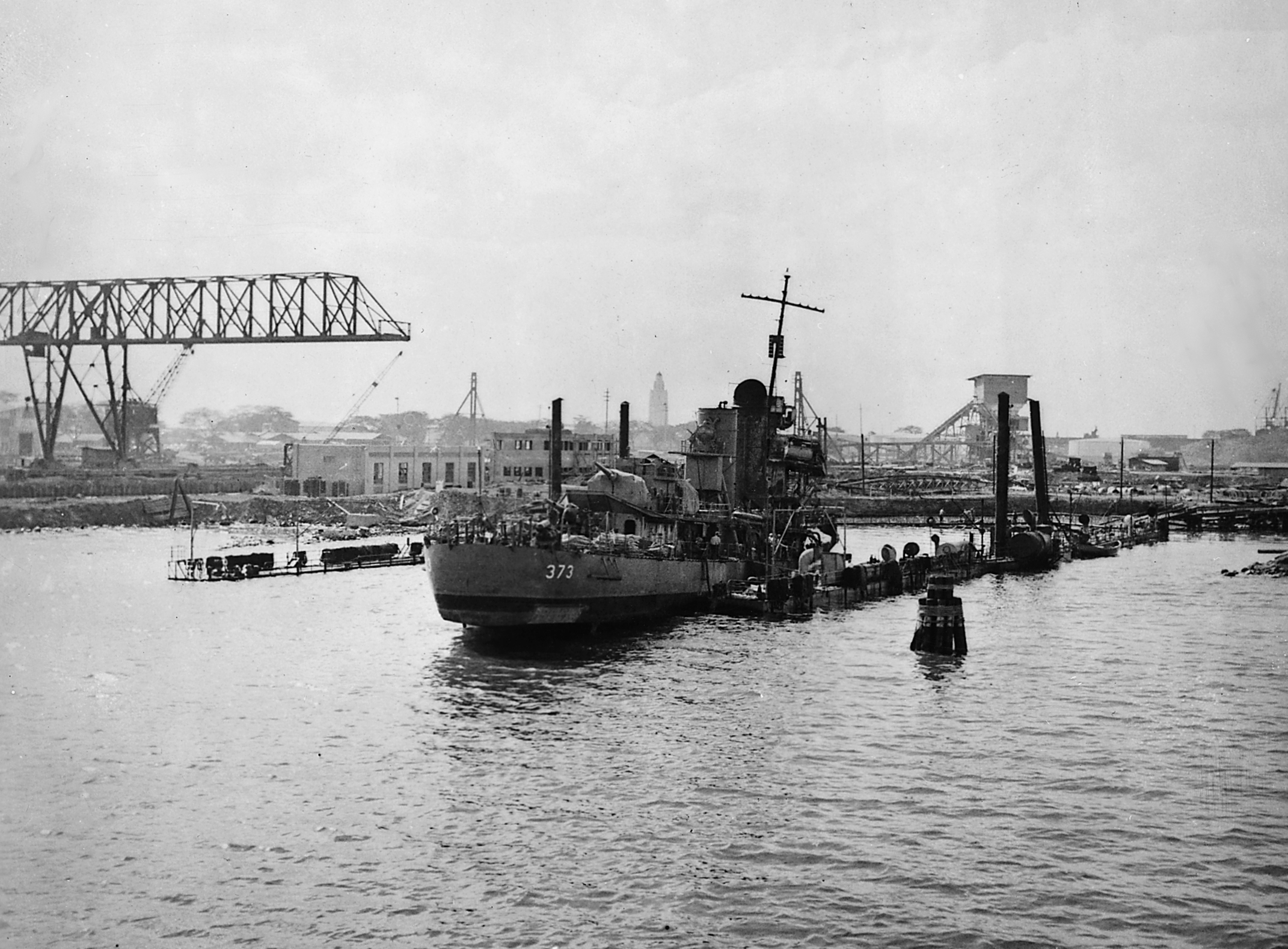
USS Shaw in sunken YFD-2 after Pearl Harbor attack

== See also ==
- Dry dock
- Hughes Mining Barge
- Semi-submersible naval vessel
- List of auxiliaries of the United States Navy
