= HMS Thracian (1920) =

Destroyer of the Royal Navy

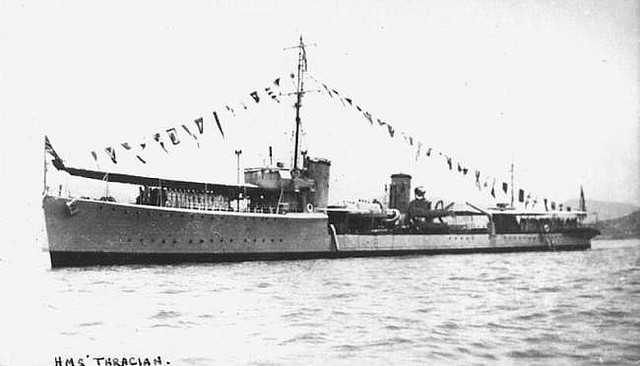
- HMS Thracian in 1941

History

United Kingdom
- Name: Thracian
- Ordered: 1915
- Builder: Hawthorn Leslie and Company; Sheerness Dockyard
- Laid down: 17 January 1918
- Launched: 5 March 1920
- Commissioned: 1 April 1922
- Identification: Pennant number: D86
- Motto: Thrust on
- Fate: Grounded on 17 December 1941 at Ngan Chau, Hong Kong

General characteristics HMS Thracian
- Class & type: S-class destroyer
- Displacement: 1,075 long tons (1,092 t)
- Length: 276 ft (84 m) o/a
- Beam: 26 ft 8 in (8.13 m)
- Draught: 9 ft (2.7 m)
- Installed power: 27,000 shp (20,000 kW); 3 × Yarrow boilers
- Propulsion: 2 Shafts; 2 steam turbines
- Speed: 36 knots (67 km/h; 41 mph)
- Range: 2,750 nmi (5,090 km; 3,160 mi) at 15 knots (28 km/h; 17 mph)
- Complement: 90
- Armament: 3 × QF 4-inch (102 mm) Mark IV guns; 1 × QF 2-pounder (40 mm) "pom-pom" anti-aircraft gun; 2 × twin 21-inch (533 mm) torpedo tubes; 2 × single 18-inch (45 cm) torpedo tubes

Japan
- Name: Patrol Boat No. 101; (第101号哨戒艇, Dai-101-Gō Shōkaitei)
- Builder: Navy 2nd Construction Department at Hong Kong
- Acquired: 1942
- Commissioned: 1 October 1942
- Decommissioned: 1945
- In service: 1942–1945
- Renamed: 15 March 1944; Special Training Ship No. 1; (特第1号練習艇, Toku Dai-1-Gō Renshūtei)
- Reclassified: Training ship, 15 March 1944
- Reinstated: Returned to Royal Navy in October 1945
- Fate: Scrapped, February 1946

General characteristics Patrol Boat No. 101
- Class & type: Patrol boat/Training ship
- Displacement: 1,150 long tons (1,168 t) standard
- Length: 80.79 m (265 ft 1 in) Lpp
- Beam: 8.17 m (26 ft 10 in)
- Draft: 3.01 m (9 ft 11 in)
- Propulsion: 2 × Brown-Curtis turbines, 3 × Yarrow water tube boilers, 2 shafts, 10,000 shp
- Speed: 25 knots (29 mph; 46 km/h)
- Complement: December 1943; 119; March 1944; 113
- Sensors & processing systems: Mk. 23 gunfire control radar (1944)
- Armament: 25 November 1942; 3 × QF 4-inch (101.6 mm) Mark IV guns; 15 March 1944; 4 × Type 92 610 mm TTs; 2 × 6th Year Type 533 mm TTs; 2 × Type 93 13 mm AA guns; 1 × Type 94 depth charge thrower; 10 × Type 95 depth charges

HMS Thracian was an S-class destroyer built for the Royal Navy during the First World War.

== Description ==
The S-class destroyers were improved versions of the preceding Modified R class. They displaced 1,075 long tons (1,092 t). The ships had an overall length of 276 feet (84.1 m), a beam of 26 feet 8 inches (8.1 m) and a draught of 9 feet (2.7 m). They were powered by two Brown-Curtis geared steam turbines, each driving one propeller shaft, using steam provided by three Yarrow boilers. The turbines developed a total of 27,000 shaft horsepower (20,000 kW) and gave a maximum speed of 36 knots (67 km/h; 41 mph). The ships carried a maximum of 301 long tons (306 t) of fuel oil that gave them a range of 2,750 nautical miles (5,090 km; 3,160 mi) at 15 knots (28 km/h; 17 mph). The ships' complement was 90 officers and ratings.

Thracian was armed with three QF 4-inch (102 mm) Mark IV guns in single mounts and a single 2-pounder (40 mm) "pom-pom" anti-aircraft gun. The ship was fitted with two twin mounts for 21-inch (533 mm) torpedoes. Two additional single mounts were positioned abreast the bridge at the break of the forecastle for 18-inch (45 cm) torpedoes. All torpedo tubes were above water and traversed to fire.

== Construction and career ==
HMS Thracian was laid down on 17 January 1918 at Hawthorn Leslie and Company, but she was not launched until 5 March 1920 due to financial constraints post-war limitation in naval expenditure. She was completed at Sheerness Dockyard on 1 April 1922.

=== Battle of Hong Kong ===
The ship took part in the Battle of Hong Kong in December 1941, commanded by Lieutenant-Commander Arthur Luard Pears. She was the only destroyer defending the colony, after the departure of HMS Scout and HMS Thanet for Singapore on 8 December. On 10 December, she took part in a raid on Japanese crafts attempting to land on Lamma Island. On 13 December, she participated in the evacuation of personnel from Kowloon and Green Island to Aberdeen, Hong Kong Island. On 16 December, she attacked Japanese boats that were preparing for the invasion of Hong Kong Island, but ran aground at Uk Kok. She was refloated later that day and returned to Aberdeen dockyard. Further into the afternoon, she became the target of Japanese high-level bombing. A near miss caused several casualties. With the dockyard badly damaged, the damage Thracian suffered from running aground was considered too bad to fix. On the next day, she was deliberately run aground at Ngan Chau. The crew of Thracian continued to defend the colony as infantry, and would suffer heavy losses in the battle and subsequent captivity. On 24 December, Japanese troops began salvaging the ship, and she was later captured by the Imperial Japanese Army.

=== Imperial Japanese Navy service (1942 – 1945) ===
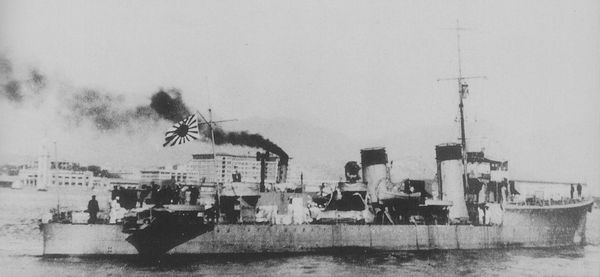
IJN Patrol Boat No. 101 in 1942

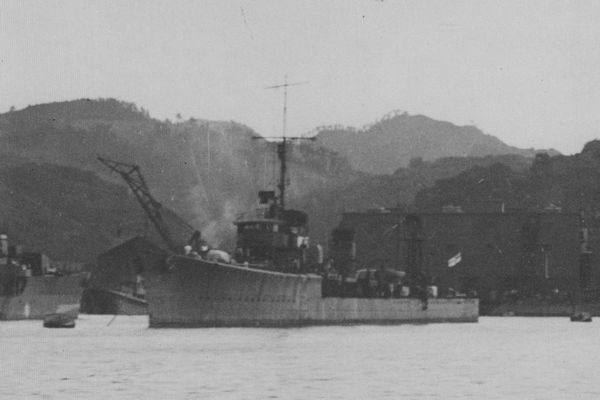
IJN Special Training Ship No. 1 in 1945

On 1 October 1942, she was registered to the naval ship list in the Imperial Japanese Navy, and classified as a special service ship (patrol boat). She was renamed Patrol Boat No. 101. On 25 November, repairs were completed by the Navy 2nd Construction Department, and she was assigned to the Yokosuka Naval District. Afterwards, she spent her time on convoy escort operations in the Yokosuka Area. On 15 August 1943, she was assigned to the torpedo warfare school at Yokosuka. On 15 March 1944, she was classified as the miscellaneous ship (training ship), and renamed Special Training Ship No. 1. She was used for a test bed for new weapons.

By August 1945, she was found in Yokosuka after an unsuccessful scuttling. In December, she was recovered by HMS Undine, only to be broken up in Hong Kong in 1946.

== Bibliography ==
- Colledge, J. J.; Warlow, Ben (2006) [1969]. Ships of the Royal Navy: The Complete Record of All Fighting Ships of the Royal Navy from the 15th Century to the Present (3rd Rev ed.). London: Chatham Publishing. ISBN 978-1-86176-281-8. OCLC 67375475.
- Banham, Tony (2003). Not the Slightest Chance: The Defence of Hong Kong, 1941. UBC Press. ISBN 978-0-7748-1045-6.
- Dittmar, F.J. & Colledge, J.J. (1972). British Warships 1914–1919. Shepperton, UK: Ian Allan. ISBN 0-7110-0380-7.
- Friedman, Norman (2009). British Destroyers: From Earliest Days to the Second World War. Barnsley, UK: Seaforth Publishing. ISBN 978-1-84832-049-9.
- Gardiner, Robert & Gray, Randal (1985). Conway's All The World's Fighting Ships 1906–1921. London: Conway Maritime Press. ISBN 0-85177-245-5.
- "Royal Navy & Royal Air force". Hong Kong War Diary. Archived from the original on 17 February 2020.
- Kwong, Chi Man; Tsoi, Yiu Lun (2013). 孤獨前哨: 太平洋戰爭中的香港戰役 [Exposed Outpost: the Battle of Hong Kong in the Pacific War] (in Chinese). Hong Kong: Cosmos Books Ltd. ISBN 9789888254347.
- Lai, Benjamin (20 June 2014). Hong Kong 1941–45: First strike in the Pacific War. Bloomsbury Publishing. ISBN 978-1-78200-269-7.
- Lenton, H. T. (1998). British & Empire Warships of the Second World War. Annapolis, Maryland: Naval Institute Press. ISBN 1-55750-048-7.
- March, Edgar J. (1966). British Destroyers: A History of Development, 1892–1953; Drawn by Admiralty Permission From Official Records & Returns, Ships' Covers & Building Plans. London: Seeley Service. OCLC 164893555.
- Mason, Geoffrey B (2003). "HMS THRACIAN (D 86) - Old S-class Destroyer". Archived from the original on 16 August 2017.
- Secretary of the Navy of Japan (1942). 昭和17年1月～12月 達. Japan Center for Asian Historical Records (in Japanese).
- Secretary of the Navy of Japan (1944). 昭和19年1月．昭和19年5月 海軍公報（部内限）. Japan Center for Asian Historical Records (in Japanese).
