= HMCS Pictou =

Flower-class corvette

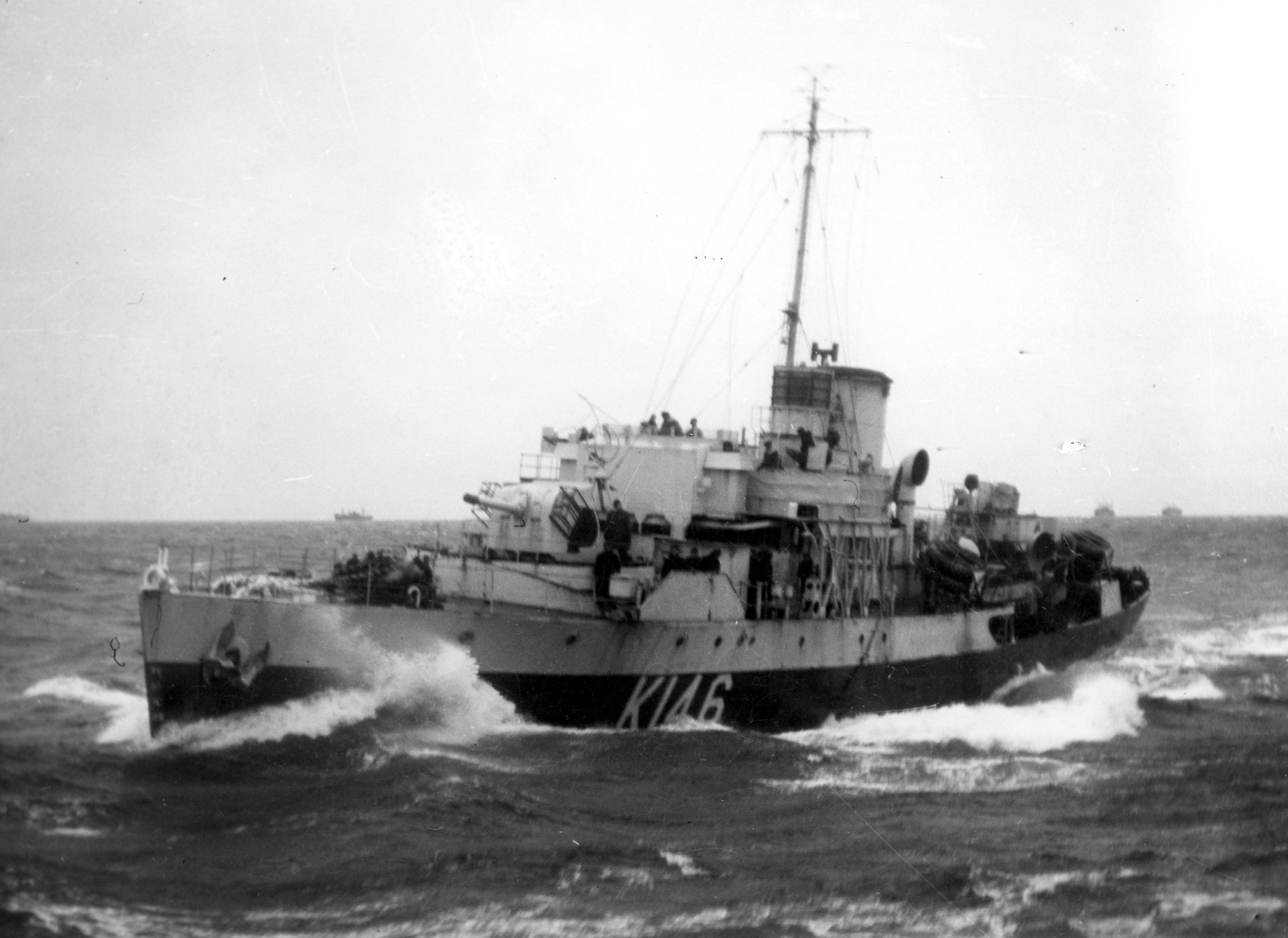
- HMCS Pictou, likely escorting a convoy, circa 1944–1945. Note the merchant ships in the distance

History

Canada
- Name: Pictou
- Namesake: Pictou, Nova Scotia
- Ordered: 22 January 1940
- Builder: Davie Shipbuilding, Lauzon
- Laid down: 12 July 1940
- Launched: 5 October 1940
- Commissioned: 29 April 1941
- Decommissioned: 12 July 1945
- Refit: Fo'c's'le extended at New York Navy Yard, New York on 31 March 1944.
- Identification: Pennant number: K146
- Honours and awards: Atlantic 1941–45
- Fate: Sold in 1950 as mercantile Olympic Chaser. Resold in 1956 as mercantile Otori Maru No. 7. Converted in 1963 to a barge.

General characteristics
- Class & type: Flower-class corvette
- Displacement: 925 long tons (940 t; 1,036 short tons)
- Length: 205 ft (62.48 m)o/a
- Beam: 33 ft (10.06 m)
- Draught: 11.5 ft (3.51 m)
- Propulsion: single shaft; 2 × fire tube Scotch boilers; 1 × 4-cycle triple-expansion reciprocating steam engine; 2,750 ihp (2,050 kW)
- Speed: 16 knots (29.6 km/h)
- Range: 3,500 nautical miles (6,482 km) at 12 knots (22.2 km/h)
- Complement: 85
- Sensors & processing systems: 1 × SW1C or 2C radar; 1 × Type 123A or Type 127DV sonar
- Armament: 1 × BL 4 in (102 mm) Mk.IX gun; 2 × .50 cal machine gun (twin); 2 × Lewis .303 cal machine gun (twin); 2 × Mk.II depth charge throwers; 2 × depth charge rails with 40 depth charges

HMCS Pictou was a Royal Canadian Navy Flower-class corvette which took part in convoy escort duties during the Second World War. She fought mainly in the Battle of the Atlantic. She was named for Pictou, Nova Scotia.

== Background ==
Flower-class corvettes like Pictou serving with the Royal Canadian Navy during the Second World War were different from earlier and more traditional sail-driven corvettes. The "corvette" designation was created by the French as a class of small warships; the Royal Navy borrowed the term for a period but discontinued its use in 1877. During the hurried preparations for war in the late 1930s, Winston Churchill reactivated the corvette class, needing a name for smaller ships used in an escort capacity, in this case based on a whaling ship design. The generic name "flower" was used to designate the class of these ships, which – in the Royal Navy – were named after flowering plants.

Corvettes commissioned by the Royal Canadian Navy during the Second World War were named after communities for the most part, to better represent the people who took part in building them. This idea was put forth by Admiral Percy W. Nelles. Sponsors were commonly associated with the community for which the ship was named. Royal Navy corvettes were designed as open sea escorts, while Canadian corvettes were developed for coastal auxiliary roles which was exemplified by their minesweeping gear. Eventually the Canadian corvettes would be modified to allow them to perform better on the open seas.

== Construction ==
Pictou was ordered on 22 January 1940 as part of the 1939–1940 Flower-class building program. She was laid down by George T. Davie & Sons Ltd. at Lauzon on 12 July 1940 and launched on 5 October 1940. She was commissioned into the RCN on 29 April 1941 at Quebec City, Quebec. During her career, Pictou had several periods in the dockyard. The first took place after being sent back three times during convoy duties with mechanical problems. The repairs began at Halifax Dockyard and were completed at Liverpool, Nova Scotia. The second period in refit was due to a collision. Repairs began in August 1942 and were completed in September. Her third major period of overhaul began in December 1942 after developing serious mechanical issues while on convoy escort. She needed emergency repairs at Halifax before heading to Liverpool to commence a serious refit. The final period of yard work of Pictou's career took place from January to 31 March 1944 at New York during which her fo'c'sle was extended.

"When the RCN took over from the British in Newfoundland in mid-1941, [Commodore Leonard W. Murray] saw escort ships streaming from the builders - and the shortage of skippers steadily worsening. For want of experienced captains, the four-month-old corvette Pictou lay idle in St John's. Murray summoned Lieutenant A.G.S.Griffin, temporarily in charge. "Just want to let you know I'm doing all I can to find another CO to get you to sea," said Murray. "Sir -," Griffin swallowed hard. "Let me have her." Murray reached a decision in seconds. "All right, I'll take a chance on you. She's yours." And he made a corvette captain of a life insurance man ... Now, with only eight weeks' sea time, the "old man", at 28, he took her to sea."

== Service history ==
After completing workups, Pictou was assigned to the Newfoundland Escort Force. She was one of the first two corvettes to become trans-Atlantic Ocean escorts. She spent the rest of 1941 as an ocean convoy escort. She was sent back to port three times with mechanical difficulties which led to her being sent for major repairs. In June 1942 she joined the Mid-Ocean Escort Force (MOEF) as part of escort group C-4.

On 5 August 1942, Pictou was rammed in fog by the Norwegian merchant SS Hindanger near St. John's. She suffered severe damage to her stern and was sent back to port for repairs. After workups she joined MOEF escort group C-2. In December 1942 she developed severe mechanical problems again and departed for repairs and then refit, not returning to service until May 1943.

In May 1943 Pictou joined MOEF escort group C-3 and remained with them until departing for refit in January 1944. After workups in Bermuda she joined the Western Local Escort Force escort group W-5 in June 1944 and remained with them until the end of the war.

Pictou was paid off from the RCN on 12 July 1945 at Sorel, Quebec. She was sold for mercantile conversion and in 1950 reappeared as the 708 GRT whalecatcher Olympic Chaser. She was renamed in 1956 as Otori Maru No. 7. In 1963 she was converted to a barge.
