= HMS Farndale =

British destroyer from World War 2

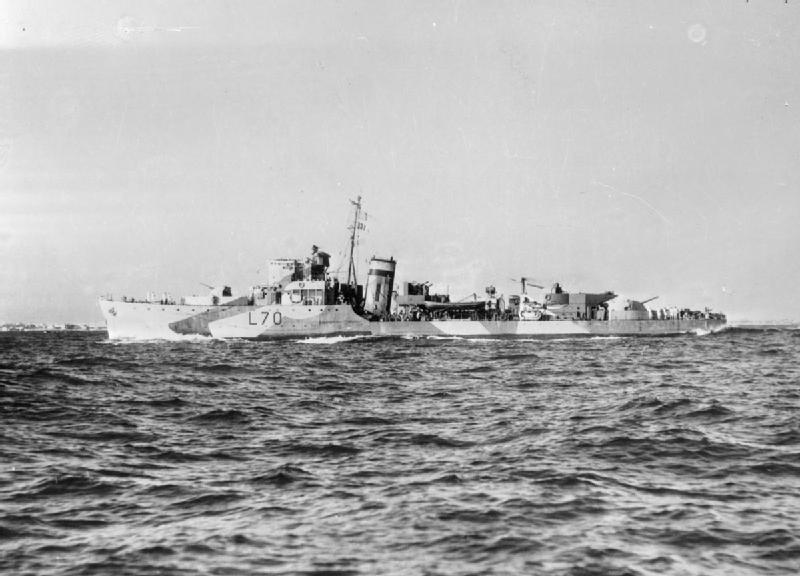
- HMS Farndale, September 1943

History

United Kingdom
- Name: HMS Farndale
- Ordered: 4 September 1939
- Builder: Swan Hunter, Wallsend
- Laid down: 21 November 1939
- Launched: 30 September 1940
- Completed: 27 April 1941
- Identification: Pennant number:L70
- Honours and awards: Malta Convoys 1941; Mediterranean 1941; Libya 1942; Atlantic 1942; Arctic 1942; North Africa 1942–43; Sicily 1943; Salerno 1943; Aegean 1943; South France 1944; North Sea 1945
- Fate: Scrapped, 1962
- Badge: On a Field Red, a plate thereon a fox's head caboosed Red within an annulet Blue

General characteristics Type II
- Displacement: 1,050 long tons (1,070 t) standard; 1,430 long tons (1,450 t) full load
- Length: 85.3 m (279 ft 10 in) o/a
- Beam: 9.6 m (31 ft 6 in)
- Draught: 2.51 m (8 ft 3 in)
- Propulsion: 2 Admiralty 3-drum boilers; 2 shaft Parsons geared turbines, 19,000 shp (14,200 kW)
- Speed: 27 knots (31 mph; 50 km/h); 25.5 kn (29.3 mph; 47.2 km/h) full
- Range: 3,600 nmi (6,700 km) at 14 kn (26 km/h)
- Complement: 164
- Armament: 6 × QF 4 in Mark XVI guns on twin mounts Mk. XIX; 4 × QF 2 pdr Mk. VIII on quad mount Mk. VII; 2 × 20 mm Oerlikons on single mounts P Mk. III; 110 depth charges, 2 throwers, 3 racks

HMS Farndale was a Type 2 Hunt-class destroyer of the Royal Navy which served in World War II. She was scrapped in 1962. She is the only British warship so far to bear this name.

== Service history ==
Farndale was ordered on 4 September 1939 under the 1939 War Emergency Build Programme. She was completed in April 1941. She was adopted by the civil community of Southgate, then in Middlesex, as part of Warship Week in 1942.

She earned eleven battle honours for extensive service during World War II. This included service in the Mediterranean where she was severely damaged in February 1942, and resulted in extensive repairs in the UK that year. She then saw service with Russian convoys, followed by work to support the allied landings in Italy. Towards the end of the war she was nominated for service in the Far East in support of Operation Zipper for landings in Malaya, which was cancelled with the end of the war.

She returned to Sheerness from the Far East in November 1945 and was transferred to the Reserve Fleet. From 1946 until 1951 she was part of the Nore Local Flotilla and was then placed in reserve again at Hartlepool. She remained there until 1962 when she was sold to BISCO for scrapping by Hughes Bolckow. She arrived at their breakers yard in Blyth on 29 November 1962.

== Publications ==
- Colledge, J. J.; Warlow, Ben (2006) [1969]. Ships of the Royal Navy: The Complete Record of All Fighting Ships of the Royal Navy from the 15th Century to the Present (3rd Rev ed.). London: Chatham Publishing. ISBN 978-1-86176-281-8. OCLC 67375475.
- English, John (1987). The Hunts: A History of the Design, Development and Careers of the 86 Destroyers of This Class Built for the Royal and Allied Navies During World War II. World Ship Society. ISBN 0-905617-44-4.
