= List of shipwrecks in May 1941 =

The list of shipwrecks in May 1941 includes all ships sunk, foundered, grounded, or otherwise lost during May 1941.

== 1 May ==
List of shipwrecks: 1 May 1941
Ship	State	Description
Arcturus	Kriegsmarine	World War II: The transport ship was torpedoed and sunk in the Mediterranean Sea 2 nautical miles (3.7 km) south of the Kerkennah Islands, Tunisia (34°38′N 11°29′E) by HMS Upholder (Royal Navy).
HNLMS Jean Frederic	Royal Netherlands Navy	World War II: The naval trawler (329 GRT) was bombed by Luftwaffe aircraft and damaged by near misses that caused her to sink in the English Channel off Start Point, Devon, United Kingdom. The whole crew abandonned the ship on two rafts but as the loss has not been noticed, 26 (the captain, 22 Dutch sailors and 3 British sailors) succumbed to exhaustion and wounds before survivors were rescued the next day by HMS ML 157 (Royal Navy).
Larissa	Kriegsmarine	World War II: The transport ship struck a mine and sank in the Gulf of Volos.
Leverkusen	Germany	World War II: The cargo ship was torpedoed and sunk in the Mediterranean Sea 4 nautical miles (7.4 km) south of the Kerkennah Islands (34°38′N 11°39′E) by HMS Upholder (Royal Navy) with some loss of life.
Nerissa	United Kingdom	World War II: Convoy HX 121: The passenger ship straggled behind the convoy. She was torpedoed and sunk in the Atlantic Ocean (57°57′N 10°08′W) by U-552 (Kriegsmarine) with the loss of 207 of the 290 people on board. Survivors were rescued by HMS Veteran (Royal Navy).
Polinice	United Kingdom	World War II: The cargo ship was bombed and sunk at Malta by Luftwaffe aircraft. She was later salvaged.
Samsø	United Kingdom	World War II: The cargo ship was torpedoed and sunk in the Atlantic Ocean (8°35′N 16°17′W) by U-103 (Kriegsmarine) with the loss of one of her twenty crew.
Santa Quitéra	Portugal	The schooner foundered in the Grand Banks of Newfoundland. Her 40 crew were rescued.
Saturnus	Royal Navy	World War II: The barrage balloon vessel was damaged by enemy action and was declared a constructive total loss.
Sea Fisher	United Kingdom	World War II: The cargo ship struck a mine in the North Sea (55°34′N 1°28′W) and was beached. She was later refloated and taken to Middlesbrough, Yorkshire.
Serdica	Italy	World War II: The cargo ship was bombed and sunk at Benghazi, Libya by Royal Air Force aircraft. There were no casualties.

== 2 May ==
For the loss of the British tanker Capulet on this day see the entry for 28 April 1941.

List of shipwrecks: 2 May 1941
Ship	State	Description
HMT Alberic	Royal Navy	The 125-foot (38 m), 286-ton minesweeping naval trawler collided with HNoMS St. Albans (Royal Norwegian Navy) and sank in the Pentland Firth with the loss of fourteen of her crew.
HMS Jersey	Royal Navy	World War II: The J-class destroyer struck a mine and sank in the Grand Harbour, Malta with the loss of 35 of her crew.
HMY Nyula	Royal Navy	World War II: The naval yacht collided with another vessel and sank in the North Sea off the mouth of the River Tyne.
Parracombe	United Kingdom	World War II: The cargo ship was sunk in the Mediterranean Sea, 9.5 nautical miles (17.6 km) off Cape Bon, Tunisia by Italian mines laid down by the cruisers Duca d'Aosta, Eugenio di Savoia, Muzzio Attendolo and Raimondo Montecuccoli (all Regia Marina). The freighter was making a solo run from Gibraltar to Malta disguised as a Spanish ship. Thirty of her 48 crew were killed. Survivors were interned by the French at Bizerte, Tunisia.
Trajan	Norway	World War II: The cargo ship was bombed and sunk in the North Sea (53°10′N 1°13′E) by Luftwaffe aircraft. All 21 crew were rescued by a Royal Navy destroyer.
V 808 Reichspräsident von Hindenburg	Kriegsmarine	World War II: The vorpostenboot was bombed and sunk in the North Sea north west of Borkum by Royal Air Force aircraft with the loss of four lives.

== 3 May ==
List of shipwrecks: 3 May 1941
Ship	State	Description
Araybank	United Kingdom	World War II: The cargo ship was bombed and damaged at Suda Bay by Luftwaffe aircraft. She was again bombed on 16 May and was declared a total loss. Araybank was refloated and taken to Trieste, Italy for repairs in 1947. She entered Italian service in 948 as Napoli.
Barnacle	United Kingdom	World War II: The sailing barge was bombed and sunk at Waterloo Dock, Liverpool, Lancashire by Luftwaffe aircraft.
Birmania	Italy	World War II: The cargo ship exploded and sank at Tripoli, Libya due to the detonation of cluster bombs improperly crated for shipment. The explosion in the forward hold flung the stern of the ship up onto the quay. The armed merchant cruiser Città di Bari (Regia Marina) was destroyed by the explosion also. The two ships suffered 28 killed and 38 wounded Germans, 42 killed and 50 wounded Italians, and 150 Arabs killed and many wounded.
Bonita	United Kingdom	World War II: The tug was bombed and sunk at Waterloo Dock, Liverpool by Luftwaffe aircraft.
Bra-Kar	Norway	World War II: The cargo ship was bombed, exploded, and sank at Liverpool by Luftwaffe aircraft. She was refloated in June and beached at Tranmere, Cheshire. She was declared a constructive total loss and subsequently scrapped.
Brill	United Kingdom	World War II: The Mersey flat was bombed and sunk at Canada Dock, Liverpool by Luftwaffe aircraft.
Canopo	Regia Marina	World War II: The Spica-class torpedo boat was bombed and sunk at Tripoli by Royal Air Force aircraft with the loss of 24 of her crew and twenty wounded.
Città di Bari	Regia Marina	World War II: The auxiliary cruiser as sunk at Tripoli by the explosion of Birmania (Italy) detonating her cargo of gasoline. The two ships suffered 28 killed and 38 wounded Germans, 42 killed and 50 wounded Italians, and 150 Arabs killed and many wounded.
Corbet	United Kingdom	World War II: The coaster struck a mine and sank 2 cables (1/5 nautical mile (370 m) off the entrance to Herculaneum Dock, Liverpool with the loss of eight of her nine crew.
Dace	United Kingdom	World War II: The Mersey flat was bombed and sunk at Canada Dock, Liverpool by Luftwaffe aircraft.
Emily Burton	United Kingdom	World War II: The motor barge was bombed and sunk at Huskisson Branch No. 3 Dock, Liverpool by Luftwaffe aircraft.
Giuseppe Orlando	Italy	World War II: The rescue ship struck a mine and sank off Tripoli with the loss of eight of the 39 people on board.
Grosvenor	United Kingdom	World War II: The Mersey flat was bombed and sunk at Canada Dock, Liverpool by Luftwaffe aircraft.
Ivy P.	United Kingdom	World War II: The coaster was bombed and sunk at Langton Branch Dock, Liverpool by Luftwaffe aircraft.
Ling	United Kingdom	World War II: The sailing barge was bombed and sunk at Huskisson Branch No. 3 Dock, Liverpool by Luftwaffe aircraft.
Longendale	United Kingdom	World War II: The barge was bombed and sunk at Alexandria Dock No. 3, Liverpool by Luftwaffe aircraft.
Luce	United Kingdom	World War II: The Mersey flat was burned out and sunk by the exploding vessels Bra-Kar (Norway) and Oyster (United Kingdom) at Liverpool by Luftwaffe aircraft.
Mus	United Kingdom	World War II: The Mersey flat was bombed and sunk at Alexandria Dock No. 3, Liverpool by Luftwaffe aircraft.
Orrell	United Kingdom	World War II: The barge was bombed and sunk at Alexandria Dock No. 3, Liverpool by Luftwaffe aircraft.
Oyster	United Kingdom	World War II: The sailing barge exploded and sank due to the explosion of Bra-Kar (Norway) at Liverpool.
Pike	United Kingdom	World War II: The sailing barge was bombed and sunk at Huskisson Branch No. 3 Dock, Liverpool by Luftwaffe aircraft.
Ray	United Kingdom	World War II: The Mersey flat was bombed and sunk at Alexandria Dock No. 3, Liverpool by Luftwaffe aircraft.
Recco	Italy	World War II: The tanker was intercepted in the Atlantic Ocean 350 nautical miles (650 km) north of the Azores (44°37′N 24°27′W) by HMS Hilary (Royal Navy) and was scuttled by her crew. All 30 were rescued by HMS Hilary.
Roach	United Kingdom	World War II: The Mersey flat was bombed and sunk at Alexandria Dock No. 3, Liverpool by Luftwaffe aircraft.
Rover	United Kingdom	World War II: The Mersey flat was bombed and sunk at Canada Dock, Liverpool by Luftwaffe aircraft.
Royston	United Kingdom	World War II: The cargo ship was bombed and damaged in the North Sea by Luftwaffe aircraft. She was taken in tow but sank the next day at 53°37′N 0°39′E.
Silverdale	United Kingdom	World War II: The sailing barge was bombed and sunk at Canada Dock, Liverpool by Luftwaffe aircraft.
Sirius	Trinity House	World War II: The lightship struck a mine and sank at Liverpool, Lancashire.
Sitona	Norway	World War II: Convoy FS 479: The cargo ship was bombed and damaged in the North Sea (53°12′N 1°11′E) by Luftwaffe aircraft. Her crew were rescued. She sank the next day.
Surveyor No.3	United Kingdom	World War II: The motor launch was bombed and sunk at Alexandria Dock No. 3, Liverpool by Luftwaffe aircraft.
Taranger	Norway	World War II: The cargo ship was torpedoed and sunk in the Atlantic Ocean (61°07′N 25°20′W) by U-95 (Kriegsmarine) with the loss of one of her 33 crew. Survivors were rescued by HMS Begonia (Royal Navy) and the fishing vessel Sigurfari ( Iceland).
Tugnin F.	Italy	World War II: The coaster was torpedoed and sunk in the Mediterranean Sea 11 nautical miles (20 km) north west of Mersa Brega, Libya by HMS Triumph (Royal Navy).
Walton	United Kingdom	World War II: The steam barge was bombed and sunk at Huskisson Branch No. 3 Dock, Liverpool by Luftwaffe aircraft.
Wray Castle	United Kingdom	World War II: The cargo ship was torpedoed and sunk in the Atlantic Ocean (6°48′N 13°55′W) by U-103 (Kriegsmarine) with the loss of one of her 57 crew. Survivors were rescued by Angola (Portugal).

== 4 May ==
List of shipwrecks: 4 May 1941
Ship	State	Description
Baron Inchcape	United Kingdom	World War II: The cargo ship was bombed and sunk at Liverpool, Lancashire by Luftwaffe aircraft.
HMT Ben Gairn	Royal Navy	World War II: The naval trawler struck a mine and sank in the North Sea off Lowestoft, Suffolk.
Domino	United Kingdom	World War II: The cargo ship was sunk at Liverpool by the explosion of Malakand (United Kingdom).
Elstree Grange	United Kingdom	World War II: The cargo ship was sunk at Liverpool by the explosion of Malakand (United Kingdom). She was beached in the River Mersey in July 1941 and was consequently scrapped.
Europa	United Kingdom	World War II: The cargo ship was set afire and burnt out at Liverpool by the explosion of Malakand (United Kingdom). Declared a constructive total loss, Europa was scrapped at New Ferry, Cheshire, in 1946.
Giuseppe La Farina	Regia Marina	World War II: The La Masa-class torpedo boat struck a mine and sank in the Mediterranean Sea off the Kerkennah Islands, Tunisia at 34°35′N 011°50′E with the loss of 61 of her 128 crew.
Japan	Sweden	World War II: Convoy OB 310: The cargo ship was torpedoed and sunk in the Atlantic Ocean 249 nautical miles (461 km) north west of Freetown, Sierra Leone (10°15′N 16°33′W) by U-38 (Kriegsmarine). All 54 people on board were taken as prisoners of war when the landed in French Guinea. The 27 Swedes were later released.
Malakand	United Kingdom	World War II: During an air raid at Liverpool, a barrage balloon crashed onto the cargo ship (7,649 GRT, 1919) and she caught fire. The fire, or a fire on the Huskisson Dock, where she was tied up, spread eventually reaching her cargo of ammunition causing her to explode and sink early on 4 May. One of her 76 crew was killed.
Pneumatic Elevator No.11	United Kingdom	World War II: The floating elevator was sunk at Liverpool by the explosion of Malakand (United Kingdom).
Tacoma Star	United Kingdom	World War II: The cargo ship was sunk by the explosion of Malakand (United Kingdom) at Liverpool. Tacoma Star was later salvaged.
Tregor	United Kingdom	World War II: The coaster was bombed and sunk in the Bristol Channel 6 nautical miles (11 km) off Trevose Head, Cornwall by Luftwaffe aircraft. Her six crew were rescued.
HMT Van Orley	Royal Navy	World War II: The 140.3-foot (42.8 m), 352-ton anti-submarine naval trawler was partially destroyed and sunk when Malakand (United Kingdom) blew up at Huskisson Dock, Liverpool, where they were both tied up. The trawler was salvaged in November 1941, declared a constructive total loss and broken up.

== 5 May ==
List of shipwrecks: 5 May 1941
Ship	State	Description
Cape Breton	United Kingdom	World War II: The cargo ship was bombed and sunk at Belfast, County Antrim by Luftwaffe aircraft. She was later refloated, repaired and returned to service.
Fair Head	United Kingdom	World War II: The cargo ship was bombed and sunk at Belfast by Luftwaffe aircraft.
HMT Fidelia	Royal Navy	World War II: The boom defence vessel was bombed and sunk at Lowestoft, Suffolk by Luftwaffe aircraft.
Industria	United Kingdom	World War II: The cargo ship was bombed and damaged at Liverpool, Lancashire by Luftwaffe aircraft. She was subsequently repaired and returned to service.
Queen Maud	United Kingdom	World War II: The cargo ship was torpedoed and sunk in the Atlantic Ocean (7°54′N 16°41′W) by U-38 (Kriegsmarine) with the loss of one of her 39 crew. Survivors were rescued by Mirandella (Portugal).
Sumba	United Kingdom	World War II: The whaler was bombed and damaged in the Bristol Channel by Luftwaffe aircraft and was beached off Barry, Glamorgan. She was later repaired and returned to service.
Traffic	United Kingdom	World War II: The steam barge was bombed and sunk at Liverpool by Luftwaffe aircraft.

== 6 May ==
List of shipwrecks: 6 May 1941
Ship	State	Description
Bengasi	Italy	World War II: The cargo ship was torpedoed and sunk in the Mediterranean Sea 3 nautical miles (5.6 km) off Cavoli by HMS Truant (Royal Navy).
Cagliari	Italy	World War II: The cargo ship was torpedoed and sunk in the Mediterranean Sea 3 nautical miles (5.6 km) off Fuscaldo (39°11′N 15°58′E) by HMS Taku (Royal Navy).
HMS Camito	Royal Navy	World War II: The ocean boarding vessel was torpedoed and sunk in the Atlantic Ocean south west of Ireland (50°42′N 21°20′W) by U-97 (Kriegsmarine) with the loss of 28 of her crew. Survivors were rescued by HMS Orchis (Royal Navy).
Dunkwa	United Kingdom	World War II: The cargo ship (4,752 GRT) was torpedoed and sunk in the Atlantic Ocean 216 miles west-northwest of Freetown (8°43′N 17°13′W) by U-103 (Kriegsmarine) with the loss of eight of her 47 crew. Survivors were rescued by Polydorus (Netherlands).
Emanuel	Faroe Islands	World War II: The fishing trawler (166 GRT) was shelled and sunk in the Atlantic Ocean (62°06′N 8°10′W) by U-556 (Kriegsmarine) with the loss of three of her crew.
Oakdene	United Kingdom	World War II: The cargo ship was torpedoed and sunk in the Atlantic Ocean (6°19′N 27°55′W) by U-105 (Kriegsmarine). Her 35 crew were rescued by HMS Dorsetshire (Royal Navy).
Sangro	Italy	World War II: The captured Italian tanker was torpedoed and sunk in the Atlantic Ocean south west of Ireland (50°42′N 21°20′W) by U-97 (Kriegsmarine). Survivors were rescued by HMS Orchis (Royal Navy).
Surat	United Kingdom	World War II: The cargo ship was torpedoed and sunk in the Atlantic Ocean (8°23′N 15°13′W) by U-103 (Kriegsmarine) with the loss of four of her 65 crew. Survivors were rescued by the hopper barge Foremost 102 (United Kingdom).

== 7 May ==
List of shipwrecks: 7 May 1941
Ship	State	Description
Bluestone	United Kingdom	World War II: The coaster was bombed and sunk at Greenock, Renfrewshire by Luftwaffe aircraft.
British Emperor	United Kingdom	World War II: The tanker was shelled and sunk in the Indian Ocean (8°30′N 56°25′E) by Pinguin (Kriegsmarine) with the loss of 45 crew between the sinking of their ship, and survivors rescued by Pinguin who were lost when the German ship was sunk the next day.
Eastern Star	Norway	World War II: Convoy OB 318: The cargo ship was torpedoed and sunk in the Atlantic Ocean (61°29′N 22°40′W) by U-94 (Kriegsmarine). Her 46 crew were rescued by HMT Daneman (Royal Navy).
Ellesbank	United Kingdom	World War II: The Mersey flat was bombed and sunk at Liverpool, Lancashire by Luftwaffe aircraft.
Fernlane	Norway	World War II: The cargo ship was torpedoed and sunk in the Atlantic Ocean (10°02′N 20°17′W) by Enrico Tazzoli (Regia Marina). Her 35 crew were rescued.
HMT Gowan Hill	Royal Navy	World War II: The naval trawler was bombed and sunk at Greenock by Luftwaffe aircraft.
Hornby	United Kingdom	World War II: The tug was bombed and sunk at Liverpool by Luftwaffe aircraft. She was raised, repaired, returned to service.
HMS Hurricane	Royal Navy	World War II: The H-class destroyer was bombed and sunk at Liverpool by Luftwaffe aircraft. She was later refloated, repaired and returned to service.
Ida Burton	United Kingdom	World War II: The sailing barge was bombed and sunk at Liverpool by Luftwaffe aircraft.
Ixion	United Kingdom	World War II: Convoy OB 318: The cargo ship was torpedoed and sunk in the Atlantic Ocean (61°29′N 22°40′W) by U-94 (Kriegsmarine). Her 105 crew were rescued by HMS Marigold (Royal Navy) and Nailsea Moor (United Kingdom).
Katina P.	Greece	World War II: The cargo ship was bombed and sunk at Astakos by Luftwaffe aircraft.
Kineenan	United Kingdom	World War II: The steam barge struck a mine and sank at Liverpool with the loss of all five crew.
München	Kriegsmarine	World War II: The weather ship was captured south east of Iceland by HMS Somali (Royal Navy). She was reported to have been scuttled by her crew, to prevent the Germans from learning that Enigma machine codes had been captured. The former fishing trawler was sold to the Faroe Islands in 1943 and renamed Froyen.
Pascoli	Italy	World War II: The cargo ship struck a mine and sank in the Adriatic Sea off Sazan Island, Albania.
Ril Ida	United Kingdom	World War II: The coaster was bombed and sunk at Hull, Yorkshire by Luftwaffe aircraft.
Safiyeh	United Kingdom	World War II: The tanker barge was bombed and sunk at "Qurnan" by Regia Aeronautica aircraft. She was later refloated, repaired and returned to service.
HMS Stoke	Royal Navy	World War II: The Hunt-class minesweeper was bombed and sunk at Tobruk, Libya by Junkers Ju 87 aircraft of II Staffeln, Sturzkampfgeschwader 2, Luftwaffe with the loss of 21 of her crew. Survivors were rescued by HMS Ladybird (Royal Navy).
HMT Susarion	Royal Navy	World War II: The naval trawler was bombed and sunk off the mouth of the Humber by Luftwaffe aircraft.
Tanais	Greece	World War II: The cargo ship was bombed and sunk at Suda Bay by Luftwaffe aircraft. She was later salvaged, repaired and entered German service.
Waterlily	United Kingdom	World War II: The fishing vessel was bombed and sunk at West Mersea, Essex by Luftwaffe aircraft.

== 8 May ==
List of shipwrecks: 8 May 1941
Ship	State	Description
Burmah	United Kingdom	World War II: The steam barge was bombed and sunk at Liverpool, Lancashire by Luftwaffe aircraft.
Capitano A. Cecchi	Italy	World War II: The cargo ship was shelled and sunk off Benghazi, Libya (31°51′15″N 19°53′20″E) by HMS Ajax, HMS Havock, HMS Hotspur and HMS Imperial (all Royal Navy).
Delite	United Kingdom	World War II: The sailing barge was bombed and sunk at Hull, Yorkshire by Luftwaffe aircraft.
F. W. No.20	United Kingdom	World War II: The dredger was sunk by an explosion in Langstone Harbour, Hampshire with the loss of three crew.
Hercules	United Kingdom	World War II: The floating crane was bombed and sunk at Liverpool by Luftwaffe aircraft. She was later salvaged, repaired and returned to service.
Irishman	United Kingdom	World War II: The tug was sunk by an explosion in Langstone Harbour with the loss of five crew.
Ladore	United Kingdom	World War II: The sailing barge was bombed and sunk at Hull by Luftwaffe aircraft.
Marton	United Kingdom	World War II: The cargo ship was bombed and sunk at Liverpool by Luftwaffe aircraft. She was declared a constructive total loss. She was beached at Tranmere, Cheshire on 27 July. Subsequently scrapped.
Pinguin	Kriegsmarine	World War II: The auxiliary cruiser was shelled and sunk in the Indian Ocean north of the Seychelles by HMS Cornwall (Royal Navy) with the loss of 341 crew and 200 prisoners of war. Sixty crew were rescued, as were 22 prisoners of war, survivors from British Emperor, Clan Buchanan and Empire Light (all United Kingdom).
Ramillies	United Kingdom	World War II: The cargo ship was torpedoed and sunk in the Atlantic Ocean (48°05′N 32°26′W) by U-97 (Kriegsmarine) with the loss of 29 of her 41 crew. Survivors were rescued by Geddington Court (United Kingdom).
Rose	United Kingdom	World War II: The steam barge was bombed and sunk at Liverpool by Luftwaffe aircraft.
HMT Silicia	Royal Navy	World War II: The naval trawler struck a mine and sank at Hull with the loss of seven of her crew. Survivors were rescued by HMML 211 (Royal Navy).
Stromboli	Norway	World War II: The cargo ship was bombed and sunk at Liverpool by Luftwaffe aircraft. She was refloated on 14 April 1942 and beached at Tranmere, but was declared a total loss and subsequently scrapped.
Tenace	Italy	World War II: The cargo ship was shelled and sunk at Benghazi by HMS Ajax, HMS Havock, HMS Hotspur and HMS Imperial (all Royal Navy).
Thistle	United Kingdom	World War II: The fishing smack struck a mine and sank in the North Sea (51°45′N 1°09′E). Her crew were rescued.
HMT Thistle V	Royal Navy	World War II: The naval trawler struck a mine and sank in the North Sea off Lowestoft, Suffolk (52°28′N 1°47′E) with the loss of ten of her eleven crew.
Trentino	United Kingdom	World War II: The cargo ship was bombed and sunk at Liverpool by Luftwaffe aircraft. She was refloated on 30 May but was consequently scrapped.
HMT Uberty	Royal Navy	World War II: The naval trawler was bombed and sunk at Lowestoft by Luftwaffe aircraft with the loss of thirteen of her crew.
UJ 173 Mob-Fd 32	Kriegsmarine	World War II: The submarine chaser was bombed and sunk off Feiestein, Norway (58°49′N 5°27′E) by British aircraft with the loss of six lives.
UJ 179 Carl Kämpf	Kriegsmarine	World War II: The submarine chaser was bombed and severely damaged off Feiestein by British aircraft. She was later repaired and returned to service.
HMY Viva II	Royal Navy	World War II: The naval yacht was bombed and sunk in the Bristol Channel 13 nautical miles (24 km) west of Trevose Head, Cornwall by Heinkel He 111 aircraft of 406 Küstenfliegergruppe, Luftwaffe with the loss of 22 of her 32 crew. Survivors were rescued by HMS Cleveland (Royal Navy).
Welcome Home	United Kingdom	World War II: The ketch was bombed and sunk at Hull by Luftwaffe aircraft.
Whitakers No. 1	United Kingdom	World War II: The barge was bombed and sunk at Hull by Luftwaffe aircraft.

== 9 May ==
List of shipwrecks: 9 May 1941
Ship	State	Description
Alfred Olsen	Norway	World War II: The cargo ship was torpedoed and damaged in the Atlantic Ocean (2°59′N 20°26′W) by Enrico Tazzoli (Regia Marina). She sank the next day (3°00′N 20°10′W). Her 34 crew were rescued.
Bengore Head	United Kingdom	World War II: Convoy OB 318: The cargo ship was torpedoed and sunk in the Atlantic Ocean (60°45′N 33°02′W) by U-110 (Kriegsmarine) with the loss of one of her 41 crew. Survivors were rescued by HMT Apollo (Royal Navy and Borgfred Norway).
City of Winchester	United Kingdom	World War II: The cargo ship was torpedoed and sunk in the Atlantic Ocean 400 nautical miles (740 km) south south west of the Cape Verde Islands, Portugal (8°20′N 26°14′W) by U-103 (Kriegsmarine) with the loss of six of her 98 crew. Survivors were rescued by Herma (Norway).
Criton	United Kingdom	World War II: The cargo ship straggled behind a convoy. She was shelled and sunk in the Atlantic Ocean by a Vichy French Navy cruiser with the loss of ten of her 34 crew.
Dan-Y-Bryn	United Kingdom	The cargo ship was bombed and damaged at Hull, Yorkshire. She was subsequently repaired and returned to service.
Empire Cloud	United Kingdom	World War II: Convoy OB 318: The cargo ship, on her maiden voyage, was torpedoed and damaged in the Atlantic Ocean east north east of Cape Farewell, Greenland (61°00′N 32°30′W) by U-201 (Kriegsmarine) with the loss of five of her 54 crew. The ship was abandoned, with HMS Nigella (Royal Navy) rescuing the survivors. Empire Cloud was taken in tow by the tug Thames (Netherlands) reaching the Clyde on 20 May, she was subsequently repaired and returned to service.
Empire Song	United Kingdom	World War II: Operation Tiger / Convoy WS 58: The cargo liner (9,228 GRT) struck a mine laid down by the cruisers Duca d'Aosta, Eugenio di Savoia, Muzzio Attendolo and Raimondo Montecuccoli (all Regia Marina) and sank in the Strait of Sicily (37°09′12″N 11°01′24″E) with the loss of eighteen of the 146 people on board (11 crew and 7 gunners). Survivors were rescued by HMS Foresight (Royal Navy).
Esmond	United Kingdom	World War II: Convoy OB 318: The cargo ship was torpedoed and sunk in the Atlantic Ocean (60°24′N 32°27′W) by U-110 (Kriegsmarine). Her 50 crew were rescued by Aelybryn (United Kingdom), HMS Aubrietia (Royal Navy) and Borgfred (Norway).
Gregalia	United Kingdom	World War II: Convoy OB 318: The cargo ship was torpedoed and sunk in the Atlantic Ocean (60°24′N 32°37′W) by U-201 (Kriegsmarine). Her 66 crew were rescued by HMT Daneman (Royal Navy.
Luis Puebla	Spain	World War II: The fishing trawler struck a mine and sank in the Bay of Biscay 160 nautical miles (300 km) north of Gijón with the loss of nine of her twelve crew.
New Zealand Star	United Kingdom	World War II: Operation Tiger / Convoy WS 8: The cargo ship struck a mine and was damaged in the Mediterranean Sea.
HMS Queenworth	Royal Navy	World War II: The minesweeper was bombed and sunk off the mouth of the Humber by Luftwaffe aircraft.
Tankerton Towers	United Kingdom	World War II: The fishing trawler was bombed and sunk off St Govan's Lightship ( Trinity House) by Luftwaffe aircraft. Her eight crew were rescued.
U-110	Kriegsmarine	World War II: Operation Primrose: The Type IXB submarine was captured in the Atlantic Ocean by HMS Aubrietia, HMS Broadway and HMS Bulldog (all Royal Navy) with the loss of fifteen of her 47 crew. An Enigma machine was captured intact. U-110 was taken in tow by HMS Bulldog but sank the next day in a storm.

== 10 May ==
List of shipwrecks: 10 May 1941
Ship	State	Description
Aelybryn	United Kingdom	World War II: Convoy OB 318: The cargo ship was torpedoed and damaged in the Atlantic Ocean south east of Cape Farewell, Greenland (59°23′N 35°25′W) by U-556 (Kriegsmarine) with the loss of one of her 45 crew. Survivors abandoned ship and were rescued by HMT Daneman (Royal Navy). Aelybryn was towed to Reykjavík, Iceland by HMS Hollyhock (Royal Navy). She was later repaired and returned to service.
HMS Altais	Royal Navy	World War II: The auxiliary ship was bombed and sunk at London by Luftwaffe aircraft.
HMS Comet I	Royal Navy	World War II: The auxiliary ship was bombed and sunk at London by Luftwaffe aircraft.
Empire Caribou	United Kingdom	World War II: Convoy OB 318: The Design 1016 ship was torpedoed and sunk in the Atlantic Ocean south east of Greenland (59°28′N 35°44′W) by U-556 (Kriegsmarine), with the loss of 29 of her 40 crew. Survivors were rescued by HMS Malcolm (Royal Navy).
HMS Faislane	Royal Navy	World War II: The auxiliary ship was bombed and sunk at London by Luftwaffe aircraft.
Gand	Belgium	World War II: Convoy OB 318: The cargo ship was torpedoed, shelled and sunk in the Atlantic Ocean (57°45′N 37°34′W) by U-552 (Kriegsmarine) with the loss of one of her 43 crew.
HMS Igloo	Royal Navy	World War II: The auxiliary ship was bombed and sunk at London by Luftwaffe aircraft.
HMS Jake II	Royal Navy	World War II: The auxiliary ship was bombed and sunk at London by Luftwaffe aircraft.
Martin Pecheur	United Kingdom	World War II: The captured French schooner caught fire and sank in the Atlantic Ocean (37°07′N 8°34′W). The prize crew took to the lifeboats and reached Gibraltar.
HMS HDML 1011	Royal Navy	World War II: The harbour defence motor launch was bombed and sunk in the Mediterranean Sea south of Crete, Greece by Luftwaffe aircraft.
HMS Miss England	Royal Navy	World War II: The auxiliary ship was bombed and sunk at London by Luftwaffe aircraft.
HMS Nomad III	Royal Navy	World War II: The auxiliary ship was bombed and sunk at London by Luftwaffe aircraft.
Ramb III	Regia Marina	World War II: The auxiliary cruiser was sunk at Benghazi Harbor, Libya by HMS Triumph (Royal Navy). She was raised, repaired, and returned to service.
HMS Safari	Royal Navy	World War II: The auxiliary ship was bombed and sunk at London by Luftwaffe aircraft.
Tower Field	United Kingdom	World War II: The cargo ship was bombed and damaged in the Thames Estuary by Luftwaffe aircraft. She was on a voyage from London to Newcastle upon Tyne, Northumberland. She was repaired and returned to service.

== 11 May ==
List of shipwrecks: 11 May 1941
Ship	State	Description
City of Shanghai	United Kingdom	World War II: The cargo ship (5,828 GRT) was torpedoed and then shelled and sunk in the Atlantic Ocean (6°40′N 27°50′W) by U-103 (Kriegsmarine). Six crew were killed during the attack and two more died of wounds in the lifeboats. The 68 survivors were rescued by Josefina S (Argentina), Richmond Castle (United Kingdom and Stad Arnhem (Netherlands).
Gypsy	Royal Navy	World War II: The auxiliary base ship was bombed and sunk at London by Luftwaffe aircraft.
Somerset	United Kingdom	World War II: The cargo ship was bombed in the Atlantic Ocean (54°54′N 16°20′W) by Focke-Wulf Fw 200 aircraft of I Staffeln, Kampfgeschwader 40, Luftwaffe. She broke in two, the stern section sank. Her crew were rescued. The bow section was scuttled by HMS Alisma (Royal Navy).

== 12 May ==
List of shipwrecks: 12 May 1941
Ship	State	Description
Aghios Paraskavi	Greece	World War II: The coaster was torpedoed and sunk in the Mediterranean Sea off Lemnos by HMS Rorqual (Royal Navy). One German officer and three other ranks were killed.
Fowberry Tower	United Kingdom	World War II: The cargo ship was bombed and sunk in the North Sea 1 nautical mile (1.9 km) south west by west of the Humber Lightship ( Trinity House) by Luftwaffe aircraft with the loss of six of her 45 crew.
HMS Ladybird	Royal Navy	World War II: The Insect-class gunboat was bombed and sunk at Tobruk, Libya by Luftwaffe aircraft with the loss of four of her crew.
Rawnsley	United Kingdom	World War II: The cargo ship was bombed and sunk at Ierapetra Bay (34°59′00″N 25°46′26″E) by Savoia-Marchetti SM.79 aircraft of 281 Squadriglia, Regia Aeronautica.
Richard de Larrinaga	United Kingdom	World War II: The cargo ship was bombed and damaged in the North Sea off the mouth of the River Tyne by Luftwaffe aircraft. She was beached on the Herd Sand with a broken back and was declared a total loss. Her 43 crew survived.

== 13 May ==
List of shipwrecks: 13 May 1941
Ship	State	Description
Benvrackie	United Kingdom	World War II: The cargo ship (6,434 GRT) was torpedoed and sunk in the Atlantic Ocean (0°49′N 20°15′W) by U-105 (Kriegsmarine) with the loss of thirteen of her 58 crew and of fifteen of the 25 survivors Lassell (United Kingdom) aboard. The 55 survivors were rescued by HMHS Oxfordshire (Royal Navy).
Cornflower	United Kingdom	World War II: The tug was bombed and sunk at Malta by Luftwaffe aircraft.
F	United Kingdom	World War II: The hopper barge struck a mine and sank off Dingle, County Kerry, Ireland with the loss of five of her eleven crew.
Fort Rona	United Kingdom	World War II: The fishing trawler was bombed and sunk in the Bristol Channel 15 nautical miles (28 km) west south west of Bardsey Island, Pembrokeshire by Luftwaffe aircraft. Her crew were rescued.
Nueva Elisa	Spain	World War II: The fishing trawler struck a mine and sank in the Bay of Biscay.
HMS Salopian	Royal Navy	World War II: Convoy SC 30: The armed merchant cruiser was torpedoed and sunk in the Atlantic Ocean (59°04′N 38°15′W) by U-98 (Kriegsmarine) with the loss of three of her 281 crew. Survivors were rescued by HMS Intrepid (Royal Navy).
Somersby	United Kingdom	World War II: Convoy SC 30: The cargo ship straggled behind the convoy. She was torpedoed and sunk in the Atlantic Ocean (60°39′N 26°13′W) by U-111 (Kriegsmarine). Her 43 crew were rescued by Marika Protopapa ( Greece).

== 14 May ==
List of shipwrecks: 14 May 1941
Ship	State	Description
Dalesman	United Kingdom	World War II: The cargo ship was bombed and damaged in Suda Bay by Luftwaffe aircraft and was beached. She was later salvaged, repaired and entered German service as Pluto.
Karlander	Norway	World War II: Convoy OB 321: The cargo ship (1,843 GRT) was bombed and damaged in the Atlantic Ocean (55°38′N 13°38′W) by Focke-Wulf Fw 200 Condor aircraft of Kampfgeschwader 40, Luftwaffe. She was later scuttled at 55°36′N 13°24′W by HMS Campanula (Royal Navy). Her 26 crew were all rescued by Zaafaran (United Kingdom).
HMT M. A. West	Royal Navy	World War II: The examination vessel (96 GRT) was bombed and sunk in the North Sea off Great Yarmouth, Norfolk by Luftwaffe aircraft. There were no casualties.
HMT Minicoy	Royal Navy	World War II: The patrol vessel (5 GRT) struck a mine and sank in the Bristol Channel east of St Ann's Head, Pembrokeshire with the loss of three of her crew.
HMNZS Puriri	Royal New Zealand Navy	World War II: The auxiliary minesweeper (927 GRT) struck a German mine and sank in the Hauraki Gulf 8 miles north east of Bream Head, off Auckland 35°46′S 174°43′E. Her commanding officer and four crewmen were killed. The 26 survivors were rescued by HMNZS Gale (Royal New Zealand Navy).
Rabaul	United Kingdom	World War II: The cargo ship (6,809 GRT) was shelled and sunk in the Atlantic Ocean (19°30′S 4°30′E) by Atlantis (Kriegsmarine). Six crew and 2 gunners were killed. One of the survivors was taken as a prisoner of war.
Turkia	Greece	The cargo ship caught fire, exploded, and sank in the Red Sea 2 1/2 nautical miles (4.6 km) off the Zafarana Lighthouse, Suez, Egypt.

== 15 May ==
List of shipwrecks: 15 May 1941
Ship	State	Description
Benvenue	United Kingdom	World War II: The cargo ship was torpedoed and sunk in the Atlantic Ocean (4°27′N 18°25′W) by U-105 (Kriegsmarine) with the loss of two of her 58 crew. Survivors were rescued by English Trader (United Kingdom) and a Royal Navy destroyer.^{[Note 1]}
Leon	Hellenic Navy	World War II: The Aetos-class destroyer was bombed and sunk in Souda Bay, Crete by Luftwaffe aircraft.
Notre Dame du Châtelet	France	World War II: The schooner was shelled and sunk in the Atlantic Ocean (approximately 48°N 14°W) by U-43 (Kriegsmarine) with the loss of 28 of her 38 crew. Survivors were rescued by Otaria (Regia Marina) eight days later.
Ossian	Sweden	World War II: The cargo ship was bombed and sunk in the North Sea (54°00′N 7°16′E) by Royal Air Force aircraft with the loss of three lives.
San Giusto	Italy	World War II: The rescue ship struck a mine and sank in the Mediterranean Sea 25 nautical miles (46 km) north north east of Tripoli, Libya. Sixteen of her crew were killed and seven were wounded.

== 16 May ==
List of shipwrecks: 16 May 1941
Ship	State	Description
Araybank	United Kingdom	World War II: The cargo ship was bombed and sunk in Suda Bay, Crete, Greece. She was salvaged in 1947, repaired, and entered Italian service as Napoli.
Archangel	United Kingdom	World War II: The troopship was bombed and damaged in the North Sea 10 nautical miles (19 km) north east of Aberdeen (57°55′N 2°03′W) by Luftwaffe aircraft with the loss of 52 of the 475 people on board. Survivors were rescued by HMS Blankney (Royal Navy). Archangel was beached 5 nautical miles (9.3 km) south of Newburgh, Aberdeenshire and broke into four sections.
Joffre Rose	United Kingdom	World War II: The coaster was bombed and damaged in the Bristol Channel by Luftwaffe aircraft. She was beached at Dale, Pembrokeshire. She was later refloated, repaired and returned to service.
Kythera	Greece	World War II: The cargo ship was bombed and sunk in Suda Bay by Luftwaffe aircraft.
Logician	United Kingdom	World War II: The ship was bombed and damaged in Suda Bay by Luftwaffe aircraft. She was bombed again on 25 May and sank with the loss of 31 lives.
Nikolaou Ourania	Greece	World War II: The cargo ship was bombed and damaged at Suda Bay by Luftwaffe aircraft and was beached. She was later refloated, repaired and entered German service as Nikolaus.
Rodney Star	United Kingdom	World War II: The cargo ship was torpedoed and sunk in the Atlantic Ocean (5°03′N 19°02′W) by U-105 (Kriegsmarine): Her 83 crew were rescued by Batna (United Kingdom) and HMS Boreas (Royal Navy).

== 17 May ==
List of shipwrecks: 17 May 1941
Ship	State	Description
Ala	Norway	World War II: The coaster was bombed and damaged in the English Channel 5 nautical miles (9.3 km) south of Shoreham-by-Sea, Sussex. She was beached at Shoreham-by-Sea, but was later refloated and taken under tow by Security (United Kingdom). She was bombed and sunk on 13 June in the English Channel (50°42′N 0°52′W) by Luftwaffe aircraft with the loss of a crew member.
Eleonora Maersk	United Kingdom	World War II: The tanker was bombed and sunk at Suda Bay, Crete, Greece by Luftwaffe aircraft with the loss of twenty of her 44 crew. Seven survivors were taken as prisoners of war. She was salvaged post-war. Under repair from 1948–1951 then sold to West Germany.
Marisa	Netherlands	World War II: The tanker was torpedoed and sunk in the Atlantic Ocean (6°10′N 18°09′W) by U-107 (Kriegsmarine) with the loss of two of her 49 crew. Survivors were rescued by HMS Columbin and HMS Surprise (both (Royal Navy).
Statesman	United Kingdom	World War II: The cargo ship was bombed and sunk in the Atlantic Ocean (56°44′N 13°45′W) by Focke-Wulf Fw 200 aircraft of I Staffeln, Kampfgeschwader 40, Luftwaffe with the loss of one of her 51 crew.
Themoni	Greece	World War II: The cargo ship was bombed and sunk at Suda Bay by Luftwaffe aircraft.

== 18 May ==
List of shipwrecks: 18 May 1941
Ship	State	Description
Begerin	United Kingdom	World War II: The coaster was bombed and sunk in the Bristol Channel 17 nautical miles (31 km) west north west of the South Bishop Lighthouse by Luftwaffe aircraft. Her crew were rescued.
Giovinezza	Italy	World War II: The cargo ship (2,362 GRT) was torpedoed and sunk in the Mediterranean Sea off Benghazi, Libya (31°55′N 19°54′E) by HMS Tetrarch (Royal Navy) with the loss of three of her 45 crew.
HMT Jewel	Royal Navy	World War II: The naval trawler struck a mine and sank in the Belfast Lough with the loss of fourteen of her crew.
RFA Olna	Royal Fleet Auxiliary	World War II: The tanker was bombed and damaged at Suda Bay by Luftwaffe aircraft. She was beached and burnt out. Although the wreck was seized by the Germans, it was scrapped in May 1945.
Piako	United Kingdom	World War II: The cargo ship was torpedoed and sunk in the Atlantic Ocean 130 nautical miles (240 km) south west of Freetown, Sierral Leone (7°52′N 14°57′W) by U-107 (Kriegsmarine) with the loss of ten of her 75 crew. Survivors were rescued by HMS Bridgewater (Royal Navy).
Tabarka	United Kingdom	World War II: The cargo ship was scuttled as a blockship in Scapa Flow (58°53′20″N 2°53′50″W). She had been refloated by 27 July 1944.

== 19 May ==
List of shipwrecks: 19 May 1941
Ship	State	Description
City of Rochester	United Kingdom	World War II: The decommissioned former paddle minesweeper was sunk at Acorn Yard, Rochester, Kent by a parachute mine whilst awaiting scrapping.
Empire Ridge	United Kingdom	World War II: Convoy HG 61: The ore carrier was torpedoed and sunk in the Atlantic Ocean 90 nautical miles (170 km) west of Bloody Foreland, County Donegal, Ireland (55°08′N 10°40′W) by U-96 (Kriegsmarine) with the loss of three gunners and 28 of her crew. Survivors were rescued by HMS Vanquisher (Royal Navy).
HMY Sea Angler	Royal Navy	The armed yacht was destroyed by fire.
Winkfield	United Kingdom	World War II: The cargo ship struck a mine and sank in the Thames Estuary one mile (1.6 km) south west of Buoy B4 (51°34′42″N 1°09′56″E) with the loss of ten of her crew. The wreck was subsequently dispersed by explosives.

== 20 May ==
List of shipwrecks: 20 May 1941
Ship	State	Description
British Security	United Kingdom	World War II: Convoy HX 126: The tanker was torpedoed and sunk in the Atlantic Ocean south of Cape Farewell, Greenland (57°28′N 41°07′W) by U-556 (Kriegsmarine) with the loss of all 53 crew.
Cockaponset	United Kingdom	World War II: The cargo ship was torpedoed and sunk in the Atlantic Ocean south south east of Cape Farewell (57°28′N 41°07′W) by U-556 (Kriegsmarine). Her 41 crew were rescued by Hontestroom (Netherlands).
Curtatone	Regia Marina	World War II: The Curtatone-class destroyer struck a mine and sank in the Gulf of Athens. Ninety-four of her crew were killed, and two more died of wounds later. There were 29 or 34 survivors depending on sources.
Darlington Court	United Kingdom	World War II: Convoy HX 126: The cargo ship was torpedoed and sunk in the Atlantic Ocean south of Cape Farewell (57°28′N 41°07′W) by U-556 (Kriegsmarine) with the loss of 25 of her 37 crew. Survivors were rescued by Hontestroom (Netherlands).
Harpagus	United Kingdom	World War II: Convoy HX 126: The cargo ship was torpedoed and sunk in the Atlantic Ocean (56°47′N 40°55′W) by U-109 (Kriegsmarine) with the loss of 58 of the 90 people on board, including 26 of the 48 survivors from Norman Monarch (United Kingdom). Survivors were rescued by HMS Burnham (Royal Navy).
Javanese Prince	United Kingdom	World War II: The cargo ship was torpedoed and sunk in the Atlantic Ocean 155 nautical miles (287 km) north west of the Butt of Lewis, Outer Hebrides (59°46′N 10°45′W) by U-138 (Kriegsmarine) with the loss of one of her 59 crew. Survivors were rescued by HMS Assurance, HMS Faulknor and HMS Lincoln (all Royal Navy).
RFA John P. Pedersen	Royal Fleet Auxiliary	World War II: Convoy HX 126: The tanker was torpedoed and sunk in the Atlantic Ocean 150 nautical miles (280 km) south of Greenland (approximately 57°N 41°W) by U-94 (Kriegsmarine) with the loss of 22 of her 38 crew. Survivors were rescued by Hontestroom (Netherlands).
Norman Monarch	United Kingdom	World War II: Convoy HX 126: The cargo ship was torpedoed and sunk in the Atlantic Ocean (56°47′N 40°55′W) by U-94 (Kriegsmarine). Her 48 crew were rescued by Harpagus (United Kingdom).
Radamos	Egypt	World War II: The cargo ship was torpedoed and sunk in the Atlantic Ocean off Monrovia, Liberia (approximately 6°N 12°W) by U-103 (Kriegsmarine) with the loss of a crew member.
Rothermere	United Kingdom	World War II: Convoy HX 126: The cargo ship was torpedoed and sunk in the Atlantic Ocean (57°48′N 41°36′W) by U-98 (Kriegsmarine) with the loss of 22 of her 56 crew. Survivors were rescued by Bruarfoss ( Iceland).
Starcross	United Kingdom	World War II: Convoy SL 73: The cargo ship was torpedoed and damaged in the Atlantic Ocean (51°45′N 20°45′W) by Otaria (Regia Marina). All 40 crew were rescued by HMCS St. Francis (Royal Canadian Navy).
HMS Widnes	Royal Navy	World War II: The Hunt-class minesweeper was bombed and damaged at Suda Bay by Luftwaffe aircraft. She was beached, but declared a total loss. Subsequently raised, repaired and put into Kriegsmarine service as UJ-2109.
Zeffiro	Italy	World War II: The cargo ship struck a mine and sank 5.8 nautical miles (10.7 km) south east of Cape Bon, Tunisia. There were no casualties.

== 21 May ==
List of shipwrecks: 21 May 1941
Ship	State	Description
Aghios Georgios	Greece	World War II: The coaster was shelled and sunk in the Aegean Sea off Crete by Royal Navy warships of Force D.
Carlo Mirabello	Regia Marina	World War II: The Mirabello-class destroyer struck a mine and sank in the Ionian Sea off Cephalonia, Greece.
Elusa	Netherlands	World War II: Convoy HX 126: The tanker was torpedoed and damaged in the Atlantic Ocean (59°00′N 38°05′W) by U-93 (Kriegsmarine) with the loss of five of her 54 crew. Survivors were rescued by HMS Burnham (Royal Navy). Elusa later sank at 58°30′N 38°10′W.
Gladiator	Italy	World War II: The coaster struck a mine and sank at Šibenik, Yugoslavia.
HMY Hanyards	Royal Navy	The armed yacht sank.
HMS Juno	Royal Navy	World War II: Battle of Crete: The J-class destroyer was bombed and sunk in the Mediterranean Sea south east of Crete, Greece by CANT Z.1007 aircraft of 50 Squadriglia, Regia Aeronautica with the loss of 128 of her 210 crew. Survivors were rescued by HMS Kandahar, HMS Kingston and HMS Nubian (all Royal Navy).
Kybfels	Germany	World War II: The cargo ship struck a mine and sank in the Ionian Sea off Cephalonia.
Marburg	Germany	World War II: The cargo ship struck a mine and sank in the Ionian Sea off Cephalonia.
Marconi	United Kingdom	World War II: Convoy HX 126: The cargo ship was torpedoed and sunk in the Atlantic Ocean 270 nautical miles (500 km) south south east of Cape Farewell, Greenland (approximately 58°N 41°W) by U-98 (Kriegsmarine) with the loss of 22 of her 74 crew. Survivors were rescued by USCGC General Greene ( United States Coast Guard) and HMS Kenya (Royal Navy).
Padre Eterno	Italy	World War II: The cargo ship was shelled and sunk in the Aegean Sea off Chania, Crete by Royal Navy warships of Force D.
Pelegrino Matteucci	Regia Marina	World War II: The Giovanni Berta-class naval trawler was sunk north west of Lefkos, Greece by mines.
SS Robin Moor	United States	World War II: The cargo ship was intercepted in the South Atlantic off the coast of Brazil (6°10′N 25°40′W) by U-69 (Kriegsmarine). Her crew were told that the ship would be sunk under prize rules and were given 30 minutes to abandon ship. She was then torpedoed, shelled and sunk. Twenty-six of the 37 people on board were rescued by Examelia (United States) and landed at Cape Town, Union of South Africa. The remaining eleven people were rescued by Ozório ( Brazil) and landed at Recifem Brazil. Robin Moor was the first American merchant ship lost during the war by belligerent action.
Tewkesbury	United Kingdom	World War II: The cargo ship was torpedoed and sunk in the South Atlantic (5°49′N 24°09′W) by U-69 (Kriegsmarine). Her 42 crew were rescued by Exhibitor and Knoxville City (both United States)

== 22 May ==
List of shipwrecks: 22 May 1941
Ship	State	Description
Barnby	United Kingdom	World War II: Convoy HX 126: The cargo ship was torpedoed and sunk in the Atlantic Ocean (60°30′N 34°12′W) by U-111 (Kriegsmarine) with the loss of one of her 45 crew. Survivors were rescued by HMS Aurora (Royal Navy).
Ben Veg	United Kingdom	The coaster collided with Brittany (United Kingdom) and sank in the Irish Sea 8 nautical miles (15 km) north of Point of Ayre, Isle of Man. Her crew were rescued.
British Grenadier	United Kingdom	World War II: The tanker was torpedoed and sunk in the Atlantic Ocean (6°15′N 12°59′W) by U-103 (Kriegsmarine). Her 49 crew were rescued by Ganda (Portugal) and Jose Calvo Sotelo (Spain).
Carmen Sylva	Romania	The cargo ship was shelled and sunk by Royal Navy warships of Force D.^{[Note 2]}
Empire Progress	United Kingdom	World War II: The cargo ship was bombed and damaged in the English Channel 3 nautical miles (5.6 km) south west of The Needles, Isle of Wight with the loss of four crew. She was beached in Totland Bay the next day. Empire Progress was later refloated, repaired and returned to service.
HMS Fiji	Royal Navy	World War II: Battle of Crete: The Crown Colony-class cruiser was bombed and sunk off Crete, Greece, by Messerschmitt Bf 109 aircraft of Jagdgeschwader 77 and Junkers Ju 88 aircraft of Lehrgeschwader 1, Luftwaffe with the loss of 241 of her 764 crew.
HMS Gloucester	Royal Navy	HMS Gloucester World War II: Battle of Crete: The Town-class cruiser was bombed and sunk 12 nautical miles (22 km) north of Crete by Junkers Ju 87 aircraft of the Luftwaffe with the loss of 722 of her 807 crew.
HMS Greyhound	Royal Navy	World War II: Battle of Crete: The G-class destroyer was bombed and sunk west of Crete by Junkers Ju 87 aircraft of Sturzkampfgeschwader 2, Luftwaffe with the loss of 80 of her 146 crew.
Käte Grammerstorf	Germany	World War II: The cargo ship struck a mine and sank in the Wadden Sea off Juist and 12 nautical miles (22 km) south of Heligoland.
HNLMS Nautilus	Royal Netherlands Navy	The minelayer collided with Murrayfield (United Kingdom) and sank in the North Sea off Saltfleet, Yorkshire (56°36′N 0°25′E) without loss of life.
HMS York	Royal Navy	HMS York World War II: The York-class cruiser, aground at Suda Bay, Crete, since 26 March 1941, was scuttled by Allied forces to prevent her capture by Axis forces. She was salvaged in February 1952 and scrapped at Bari, Italy.

== 23 May ==
List of shipwrecks: 23 May 1941
Ship	State	Description
Berhala	Netherlands	World War II: Convoy OB 318: The cargo ship was torpedoed and sunk in the Atlantic Ocean off Freetown, Sierra Leone (9°50′N 17°50′W) by U-38 (Kriegsmarine) with the loss of three of her 62 crew. Survivors were rescued by a Royal Navy warship.
HMS Kashmir	Royal Navy	World War II: Battle of Crete: The K-class destroyer was bombed and sunk off Crete, Greece (34°40′N 24°10′E) by Junkers Ju 87 aircraft of the Luftwaffe.
HMS Kelly	Royal Navy	World War II: Battle of Crete: The K-class destroyer was bombed and sunk off Crete by Junkers Ju 87 aircraft of the Luftwaffe.
HMT Kos XXIII	Royal Navy	World War II: The naval trawler was bombed and damaged in Suda Bay, Crete by Luftwaffe aircraft. She was later declared a total loss. Two of her crew were taken as prisoners of war. She was later salvaged by the Germans and entered Kriegsmarine service as UJ-2104.
MTB 67, MTB 213, MTB 214, MTB 216, and MTB 217	Royal Navy	World War II: Battle of Crete: The Thornycroft 55-foot-class motor torpedo boats were bombed and sunk at Suda Bay by Luftwaffe aircraft.
Meuliere	French Navy	The Albatre-class gunboat was wrecked off Ajaccio, Corsica.

== 24 May ==
List of shipwrecks: 24 May 1941
Ship	State	Description
HMT Aurora II	Royal Navy	World War II: The naval trawler was bombed and sunk at Tobruk, Libya by Junkers Ju 87 aircraft of the Luftwaffe.
HMS Hood	Royal Navy	HMS Hood World War II: Battle of the Denmark Strait: The Admiral-class battlecruiser was shelled and sunk in the Denmark Strait by Bismarck (Kriegsmarine) with the loss of 1,415 of her 1,418 crew. Survivors were rescued by HMS Electra (Royal Navy).
Marionga	Greece	World War II: The cargo ship was torpedoed and sunk in the Atlantic Ocean (5°42′N 10°29′W) by U-103 (Kriegsmarine) with the loss of 26 of her 29 crew.
Matronna	Greece	World War II: The cargo ship was bombed and sunk in the Bristol Channel off Dale, Pembrokeshire, United Kingdom by Luftwaffe aircraft. Her 28 crew were rescued. The wreck was subsequently dispersed by explosives.
Octane	United Kingdom	World War II: The tanker struck a mine and was damaged in the English Channel and was beached at Antony, Cornwall. Three of her crew were killed. She was later refloated, repaired and returned to service.
Trafalgar	United Kingdom	World War II: The cargo ship was shelled and sunk in the South Atlantic (approximately 25°S 1°E) by Atlantis (Kriegsmarine) with the loss of twelve of her 44 crew.
Vulcain	United Kingdom	World War II: The cargo ship was torpedoed and sunk in the Atlantic Ocean (9°20′N 15°35′W) by U-38 (Kriegsmarine) with the loss of seven of her 41 crew.

== 25 May ==
List of shipwrecks: 25 May 1941
Ship	State	Description
Arima Maru	Japan	The cargo ship ran aground four miles (6.4 km) south of Mollendo, Peru. She was refloated on 24 September and towed to Callao, Peru for temporary repairs. Arima Maru departed on 9 October for Yokohama, arriving on 20 November for permanent repairs. Subsequently repaired and returned to service.
Atalaia	Brazil	The cargo ship foundered in the South Atlantic (39°07′N 01°10′W) with the loss of all 66 crew.
Conte Rosso	Italy	World War II: The troopship was shelled and sunk in the Strait of Messina (36°41′N 14°42′E) by HMS Upholder (Royal Navy) with the loss of 1,297 of the 2,729 people on board. Survivors were rescued by Cigno, Clio and Pallade (all Regia Marina).
HMS Grimsby	Royal Navy	World War II: The Grimsby-class sloop was bombed and sunk in the Mediterranean Sea north of Tobruk, Libya (32°30′N 24°30′E) by Junkers Ju 87 aircraft of 239 Squadriglia, Regia Aeronautica with the loss of eleven of her crew. Survivors were rescued by HMSAS Southern Maid (South African Navy).
Harry	Faroe Islands	World War II: The fishing trawler was bombed and damaged in the North Sea 30 nautical miles (56 km) north of Rattray Head, Aberdeenshire, United Kingdom by Luftwaffe aircraft. She was taken in tow but sank 17 nautical miles (31 km) north by west of Kinnaird Head, Aberdeenshire.
Helka	United Kingdom	World War II: The tanker (3,478 GRT) was bombed and sunk in the Mediterranean Sea off Tobruk by Junkers Ju 87 aircraft of 239 Squadriglia, Regia Aeronautica. One crew and one gunner were killed. The 44 survivors were rescued by HMSAS Southern Maid (South African Navy).
H. P. Hanssen	Denmark	World War II: The cargo ship was bombed and sunk in the North Sea 6 nautical miles (11 km) north west of the Schiermonnikoog Lighthouse, Friesland, Netherlands by Luftwaffe aircraft.
Leros	Greece	World War II: The coaster was bombed and sunk at Heraklion by Luftwaffe aircraft.
Menlière	French Navy	The sloop-of-war ran aground off Corsica and was wrecked.
Silvia	Germany	World War II: The sperrbrecher was sunk at Den Helder, North Holland, Netherlands by a crashing Royal Air Force aircraft.
Silvina	Portugal	The schooner caught fire and sank in the Grand Banks of Newfoundland. Her crew were rescued.
Wangi Wangi	Netherlands	World War II: The cargo ship was torpedoed and sunk in the Atlantic Ocean (5°24′N 12°00′W) by U-103 (Kriegsmarine) with the loss of one of the 93 people on board.

== 26 May ==
List of shipwrecks: 26 May 1941
Ship	State	Description
Emmanuel Pteris	Greece	World War II: The cargo ship was bombed and sunk at Heraklion, Crete by Luftwaffe aircraft.
Gros Pierre	United Kingdom	World War II: The coaster was bombed and damaged in the North Sea off Sunderland, County Durham by Luftwaffe aircraft and was beached. She was later refloated, repaired and returned to service.
Rokos	Greece	World War II: The cargo ship was bombed and sunk at Suda Bay by Luftwaffe aircraft.

== 27 May ==
List of shipwrecks: 27 May 1941
Ship	State	Description
Antonios	Greece	World War II: The cargo ship was bombed and sunk in Suda Bay by Luftwaffe aircraft.
Bismarck	Kriegsmarine	World War II: The Bismarck-class battleship was torpedoed and damaged in the Atlantic Ocean by Fairey Swordfish aircraft based on HMS Ark Royal (Royal Navy). She was then shelled by HMS King George V and HMS Rodney (both Royal Navy) and torpedoed and sunk (48°10′N 16°12′W) by HMS Dorsetshire (Royal Navy) with the loss of 2,179 of her 2,293 crew. Eighty-five survivors were rescued by HMS Dorsetshire, 25 by HMS Maori, (both (Royal Navy)) and approximately 100 by the weather ship Sachsenwald (Kriegsmarine).
Colonial	United Kingdom	World War II: The cargo ship was torpedoed and sunk in the Atlantic Ocean 200 nautical miles (370 km) west north west of Freetown, Sierra Leone (9°13′N 15°09′W) by U-107 (Kriegsmarine). All 100 people on board were rescued by HMS Centurion (Royal Navy).
Eleni Canavarioti	Greece	World War II: the coaster struck a mine and sank off Thessaloniki with the loss of 196 lives (Serbian prisoners of war). She was scrapped after the war.
HMT Evesham	Royal Navy	World War II: The 116-foot (35 m), 239-ton minesweeping naval trawler was bombed and sunk in the North Sea off Great Yarmouth, Norfolk by Luftwaffe aircraft. Raised and scrapped either April 1945 or April 1946.
Julia	Greece	World War II: The cargo ship was bombed and sunk in Suda Bay by Luftwaffe aircraft. She was subsequently salvaged and taken in to German service.
Marco Foscarini	Italy	World War II: The cargo ship was bombed and damaged in the Mediterranean Sea off Tripoli, Libya by British aircraft and was beached on 30 May. She was later refloated, and was scrapped in Barrow, United Kingdom, from October 1948.
HMS Registan	Royal Navy	World War II: The ocean boarding vessel was bombed and damaged in the Bristol Channel off Cape Cornwall by Luftwaffe aircraft with the loss of 70 of her crew. She was beached at Falmouth, Cornwall. Later refloated, repaired and returned to service.
Røyksund	Norway	World War II: The coaster was bombed and sunk in the Bristol Channel (50°46′N 5°18′W) by Luftwaffe aircraft with the loss of seven of her eighteen crew. Survivors were rescued by HMS Cleveland (Royal Navy).
HMT Syvern	Royal Navy	World War II: The naval trawler was bombed and sunk in the Mediterranean Sea by Luftwaffe aircraft.
HMT Thorbryn	Royal Navy	World War II: The naval trawler was bombed and sunk in the Mediterranean Sea off Tobruk, Libya by Luftwaffe aircraft.
Thyra	Norway	World War II: Convoy OB 325: The cargo ship collided with HMS Leamington (Royal Navy) in the Atlantic Ocean (52°25′N 19°22′W) and sank with the loss of five of the 24 people on board. Survivors were rescued by HMS Leamington.

== 28 May ==
List of shipwrecks: 28 May 1941
Ship	State	Description
Aghia Kyriaki	Greece	World War II: The coaster was bombed and sunk off Cape Kephola, Crete by Luftwaffe aircraft.
Georgos	Greece	World War II: The coaster was bombed and sunk at Heraklion, Crete by Luftwaffe aircraft.
HM HDML 1030	Royal Navy	World War II: Battle of Crete: The Harbour Defence Motor Launch was sunk in the Mediterranean Sea 15 miles (24 km) west of "Gavolopula" by German bombers after departing from Suda Bay for Alexandria. Her ten crew survived and reached Crete where most were captured some days later.
Lech	Germany	World War II: The cargo ship was intercepted in the Atlantic Ocean 400 nautical miles (740 km) north of the Azores, Portugal (45°33′N 23°25′W) by HMS Edinburgh (Royal Navy) and was scuttled by her crew.
HMS Mashona	Royal Navy	World War II: The Tribal-class destroyer was bombed and sunk in the Atlantic Ocean off the coast of County Galway, Ireland by Junkers Ju 88 aircraft of I Staffeln, Kampfgeschwader 77, Luftwaffe with the loss of 48 of her 219 crew.
Papalemos	Greece	World War II: The cargo ship was torpedoed, shelled and sunk in the Atlantic Ocean (8°06′N 16°18′W) by U-107 (Kriegsmarine) with the loss of two of her 29 crew.

== 29 May ==
List of shipwrecks: 29 May 1941
Ship	State	Description
Empire Storm	United Kingdom	World War II: Convoy HX 128S: The cargo ship straggled behind the convoy. She was torpedoed and sunk in the Atlantic Ocean (55°00′N 39°50′W) by U-557 (Kriegsmarine) with the loss of three of her 43 crew. Survivors were rescued by Marita (Norway).
HMS Hereward	Royal Navy	World War II: Battle of Crete: The H-class destroyer was bombed and sunk in the Kaso Strait to the east of Crete, Greece by Junkers Ju 87 aircraft of the Luftwaffe with the loss of 76 of her 165 crew.
HMS Imperial	Royal Navy	World War II: Battle of Crete: The I-class destroyer was bombed and severely damaged by Luftwaffe aircraft. She was scuttled in the Mediterranean Sea (32°23′N 25°40′E) by HMS Hotspur.
HMT Sindonis	Royal Navy	World War II: The naval trawler was bombed and sunk at Tobruk, Libya by Junkers Ju 87 aircraft of II Staffeln, Sturzkampfgeschwader 2, Luftwaffe.
Tabaristan	United Kingdom	World War II: The cargo ship was torpedoed and sunk in the Atlantic Ocean (6°32′N 15°23′W) by U-38 (Kriegsmarine). Twenty-one crew members were lost, while the master, 35 crew members and three gunners were rescued by HMT Bengali and HMT Turcoman (both Royal Navy). They were landed at Freetown, Sierra Leone.

== 30 May ==
List of shipwrecks: 30 May 1941
Ship	State	Description
Aghios Panteleimon	Greece	World War II: The coaster was bombed and sunk in the Mediterranean Sea off Tobruk, Libya by Luftwaffe aircraft.
Alicante	Kriegsmarine	World War II: The transport ship was set on fire at Piraeus, Greece by the explosion of Knyaguinya Maria Luisa (Bulgaria). She exploded and sank.
RFA Cairndale	Royal Fleet Auxiliary	World War II: The Dale-class oiler was torpedoed and sunk in the Atlantic Ocean 170 nautical miles (310 km) west north west of Cape Trafalgar, Spain (35°19′N 8°33′W) by Guglielmo Marconi (Regia Marina) with the loss of five of her crew.
Empire Protector	United Kingdom	World War II: The cargo ship was torpedoed and sunk in the Atlantic Ocean (6°00′N 14°25′W) by U-38 (Kriegsmarine) with the loss of five of her 38 crew. Survivors were rescued by Arundo (Netherlands).
Jiul	Romania	World War II: The cargo ship was set on fire by the explosion of Fürstin Maria Luisa (Germany) at Piraeus and subsequently sank.
Knyaguinya Maria Luisa	Bulgaria	World War II: The cargo ship (3,821 GRT, 1919) was bombed by British aircraft and set afire Piraeus. Her master realized that the fire could not be extinguished and ordered most of the crew to evacuate, remaining aboard with only six men. The tugs Mara, Zoodohos Pigi, Aghios Dimitrios and Aghios Nikolaos (all Greece) were towing the ship out of harbour when she exploded. The explosion set Adis Abeba (Italy), Alicante (Germany) and Jiul (Romania) on fire. All seven men aboard Knyaguinya Maria Luisa were killed, total casualties in the port being around 200.
Rinda	Norway	World War II: The cargo ship was torpedoed and sunk in the Atlantic Ocean off the coast of Liberia (6°52′N 15°14′W) by U-38 (Kriegsmarine) with the loss of thirteen of her 31 crew. Survivors, including the ship's cat, were rescued by HMT Pict (Royal Navy). The cat remained on board HMT Pict.
Silveryew	United Kingdom	World War II: The cargo ship (6,373 GRT) was torpedoed and sunk in the Atlantic Ocean (16°42′N 25°29′W) by U-106 (Kriegsmarine) with the loss of three of her 60 crew.
Westavon	United Kingdom	World War II: The cargo ship struck a mine and sank in the North Sea (51°36′N 1°11′E). Her crew were rescued.

== 31 May ==
List of shipwrecks: 31 May 1941
Ship	State	Description
Clan Macdougall	United Kingdom	World War II: The cargo ship was torpedoed and sunk in the Atlantic Ocean north of the Cape Verde Islands, Portugal (16°50′N 25°10′W) by U-106 (Kriegsmarine) with the loss of two of her 85 crew.
Florida II	Italy	World War II: The cargo ship was sunk by British aircraft at Sfax, Tunisia. She was later refloated, repaired and returned to service.
Gravelines	United Kingdom	World War II: Convoy HX 127: The cargo ship straggled behind the convoy She was torpedoed and damaged in the Atlantic Ocean off Bloody Foreland, County Donegal, Ireland (56°00′N 11°13′W) by U-147 (Kriegsmarine). Eleven crew were killed, 25 crew were rescued by HMS Deptford (Royal Navy). The ship broke in two; the stern section sank but the bow section was towed to the Clyde and beached. The ship was declared a constructive total loss and scrapped in 1942.
Holmsteinn	Iceland	World War II: The fishing trawler (16 GRT) was shelled and sunk north of Dyrafjord (65°39′N 26°23′W) by U-204 (Kriegsmarine) with the loss of all four crew.
Sangara	United Kingdom	World War II: The cargo ship was torpedoed and sunk at Accra, Gold Coast (5°33′N 0°13′W) by U-69 (Kriegsmarine) with the loss of a crew member. Although declared a total loss, she was refloated in April 1943, repaired post-war and returned to service in 1947.
Sire	United Kingdom	World War II: The cargo ship was torpedoed and sunk in the Atlantic Ocean west south west of Freetown, Sierra Leone (8°50′N 15°30′W) by U-107 (Kriegsmarine) with the loss of three of her 49 crew. Survivors were rescued by HMS Marguerite (Royal Navy).

== Unknown date ==
List of shipwrecks: Unknown date 1941
Ship	State	Description
Ellesport	United Kingdom	World War II: The barge was sunk by either bombing on 3 May, or by the explosion of Malakand (United Kingdom) on 4 May at Alexandria Dock No. 3, Liverpool, Lancashire.
Ines	Germany	World War II: The coaster was rammed and sunk by a Royal Australian Navy ship off Crete, Greece .
Iron Duke	(flag) United Kingdom	World War II: The steamship struck a mine and sank in the Bristol Channel off the Breaksea Lightship ( Trinity House ).
HMS LCA 28	Royal Navy	The Landing Craft, Assault was lost sometime in May.
HMS LCP(L) 107, HMS LCP(L) 108, and HMS LCP(L) 109	Royal Navy	The Landing Craft Personnel (Large) were lost sometime in May.
HMS Undaunted	Royal Navy	World War II: The U-class submarine was sunk in the Mediterranean Sea on or about 11 May due to enemy action with the loss of all 31 crew.

== Notes ==
1. The destroyer was one of HMS Boreas, HMS Duncan, HMS Highlander or HMS Velox.
2. Force D comprised HMS Ajax, HMS Dido, HMS Hasty, HMS Hereward, HMS Janus, HMS Kimberley and HMS Orion.
