= USS Aulick =

Two ships of the United States Navy have been named Aulick, in honor of John H. Aulick.

- USS Aulick (DD-258), was a Clemson-class destroyer, commissioned in 1919, and transferred to the Royal Navy where she served as HMS Burnham during World War II.
- USS Aulick (DD-569), was a Fletcher-class destroyer, commissioned in 1942, and decommissioned in 1946. She was later sold to Greece in 1977.
