= KOKC =

KOKC may refer to:

- OKC Will Rogers International Airport, Oklahoma City, United States, ICAO airport code KOKC
- KOKC (AM), a radio station licensed to Oklahoma City, Oklahoma, United States
- KOKC, 1933–41 code letters for SS Empire Caribou
