= German submarine U-556 =

German World War II submarine

History

Nazi Germany
- Name: U-556
- Ordered: 25 September 1939
- Builder: Blohm & Voss, Hamburg
- Yard number: 532
- Laid down: 2 January 1940
- Launched: 7 December 1940
- Commissioned: 6 February 1941
- Fate: Sunk on 27 June 1941

General characteristics
- Class & type: Type VIIC submarine
- Displacement: 769 tonnes (757 long tons) surfaced; 871 t (857 long tons) submerged
- Length: 67.10 m (220 ft 2 in) o/a; 50.50 m (165 ft 8 in) pressure hull
- Beam: 6.20 m (20 ft 4 in) o/a; 4.70 m (15 ft 5 in) pressure hull
- Height: 9.60 m (31 ft 6 in)
- Draught: 4.74 m (15 ft 7 in)
- Installed power: 2,800–3,200 PS (2,100–2,400 kW; 2,800–3,200 bhp) (diesels); 750 PS (550 kW; 740 shp) (electric)
- Propulsion: 2 shafts; 2 × diesel engines; 2 × electric motors
- Speed: 17.7 knots (32.8 km/h; 20.4 mph) surfaced; 7.6 knots (14.1 km/h; 8.7 mph) submerged
- Range: 8,500 nmi (15,700 km; 9,800 mi) at 10 knots (19 km/h; 12 mph) surfaced; 80 nmi (150 km; 92 mi) at 4 knots (7.4 km/h; 4.6 mph) submerged
- Test depth: 230 m (750 ft); Crush depth: 250–295 m (820–968 ft)
- Complement: 4 officers, 40–56 enlisted
- Armament: 5 × 53.3 cm (21 in) torpedo tubes (four bow, one stern); 14 × G7e torpedoes or 26 TMA mines; 1 × 8.8 cm (3.46 in) deck gun (220 rounds); 1 x 2 cm (0.79 in) C/30 AA gun

Service record
- Part of: 1st U-boat Flotilla; 6 February – 27 June 1941
- Identification codes: M 36 839
- Commanders: Kptlt. Herbert Wohlfarth; 6 February – 27 June 1941
- Operations: 2 patrols: 1st patrol: 1 – 30 May 1941; 2nd patrol: 19 – 27 June 1941
- Victories: 6 merchant ships sunk (29,552 GRT); 1 merchant ship damaged (4,986 GRT)

German submarine U-556 was a Type VIIC U-boat of Nazi Germany's Kriegsmarine during World War II. She was laid down on 2 January 1940 at the Blohm & Voss yard in Hamburg as yard number 532, launched on 7 December 1940, and commissioned on 6 February 1941 under the command of Kapitänleutnant Herbert Wohlfarth, who commanded her for her entire career that lasted less than five months. U-556 conducted only two patrols, sinking six ships totalling 29,552 gross register tons (GRT) and damaging one other of 4,986 GRT, before she was sunk on 27 June 1941.

== Design ==
German Type VIIC submarines were preceded by the shorter Type VIIB submarines. U-556 had a displacement of 769 tonnes (757 long tons) when at the surface and 871 tonnes (857 long tons) while submerged. She had a total length of 67.10 m (220 ft 2 in), a pressure hull length of 50.50 m (165 ft 8 in), a beam of 6.20 m (20 ft 4 in), a height of 9.60 m (31 ft 6 in), and a draught of 4.74 m (15 ft 7 in). The submarine was powered by two Germaniawerft F46 four-stroke, six-cylinder supercharged diesel engines producing a total of 2,800 to 3,200 metric horsepower (2,060 to 2,350 kW; 2,760 to 3,160 shp) for use while surfaced, two Brown, Boveri & Cie GG UB 720/8 double-acting electric motors producing a total of 750 metric horsepower (550 kW; 740 shp) for use while submerged. She had two shafts and two 1.23 m (4 ft) propellers. The boat was capable of operating at depths of up to 230 metres (750 ft).

The submarine had a maximum surface speed of 17.7 knots (32.8 km/h; 20.4 mph) and a maximum submerged speed of 7.6 knots (14.1 km/h; 8.7 mph). When submerged, the boat could operate for 80 nautical miles (150 km; 92 mi) at 4 knots (7.4 km/h; 4.6 mph); when surfaced, she could travel 8,500 nautical miles (15,700 km; 9,800 mi) at 10 knots (19 km/h; 12 mph). U-556 was fitted with five 53.3 cm (21 in) torpedo tubes (four fitted at the bow and one at the stern), fourteen torpedoes, one 8.8 cm (3.46 in) SK C/35 naval gun, 220 rounds, and a 2 cm (0.79 in) C/30 anti-aircraft gun. The boat had a complement of between forty-four and sixty.

== Service history ==
=== First patrol ===
U-556 sailed from Kiel for her first patrol on 1 May 1941. She headed out into the waters of the northern Atlantic, south of Greenland. She made her first kill on 6 May, sinking the 166 GRT Faroese fishing trawler Emanuel with her deck gun west of the Faroe Islands.

On 10 May she joined the wolfpack West attacking Convoy OB 318 south-east of Cape Farewell. Her first victim was the 4,986 GRT British merchant ship Aelybryn, hit by one of the torpedoes fired by the U-boat at 04:42. Badly damaged, but suffering only a single casualty, the ship was towed to Reykjavík by HMS Hollyhock.

The convoy scattered, but at 07:52 U-556 torpedoed and sank the 4,861 GRT British merchant ship Empire Caribou. Nine crew members and two gunners were later picked up by HMS Malcolm, but the master, 31 crewmen, and two gunners were lost.

The U-boat had her third success of the day at 20:37, sinking the 5,086 GRT Belgian merchant ship Gand. One crew member was lost and another wounded. The master, 38 crewmen and four gunners were rescued by HMS Burwell.

Ten days later, on 20 May, the wolfpack attacked Convoy HX 126. Between 14:48 and 15:16 U-556 fired torpedoes at the convoy and sank two British merchant ships, the 4,974 GRT Darlington Court and the 5,995 GRT Cockaponset, and the 8,470 GRT tanker British Security. Loaded with 11,200 tons of benzine and kerosene, the tanker caught fire and burned for three days before sinking. There were no survivors from her crew of 53.

==== The sinking of Bismarck ====
On 26 May, while returning from patrol, low on fuel and having fired all her torpedoes, U-556 was ordered to reconnoitre the most recently reported position of the battleship Bismarck.

U-556 and Bismarck had been neighbours in the ways at Blohm & Voss and their construction was completed at about the same time. (Bismarck was commissioned on 24 August 1940.) In January 1941, as U-556's commissioning ceremony approached, Wohlfarth wanted a band for the celebration, but could not afford to hire one. Kapitän Ernst Lindemann, commanding officer of Bismarck, lent him his ship's band.

Wohlfarth's Patenschaftsurkunde

As thanks, Wohlfarth drew up a humorous Patenschaftsurkunde ("Certificate of Sponsorship") promising that U-556 would protect Bismarck. A drawing shows Wohlfarth as the knight Parzival [Percival] (his nickname) on the deck of U-556 simultaneously bringing down planes with a sword and reaching underwater to stop a torpedo with his thumb. A second drawing then shows the submarine towing the battleship to safety.

The text accompanying the drawing reads:

Wir U556 (500 to) erklären hiermit vor Neptun, dem Herrscher über Ozeane, Meere, Seen, Flüsse, Bäche, Teiche und Rinnsale daß wir unserem grossen Bruder, dem Schlachtschiff Bismarck (42.000 to) in jeder Lage, zu Wasser, unter Wasser, zu Lande wie in der Luft beistehen wollen.

Hamburg, den 28. Januar 1941
Kommandant u
Besatzung U556

We, U-556 (500 tons), hereby declare before Neptune, Lord over oceans, seas, lakes, rivers, brooks, ponds, and rivulets, that we will provide any desired assistance to our Big Brother, the battleship Bismarck (42,000 tons), at any place on the water, underwater, on land, or in the air.

Hamburg, 28 January 1941
Commander &
Crew U556

Around 19:50, Wohlfahrt saw the battlecruiser HMS Renown and the aircraft carrier HMS Ark Royal coming out of the mist at high speed. He recorded in his log, "Enemy bows on, 10 degrees to starboard, without destroyers, without zigzagging," but without any torpedoes, could only submerge and avoid them. Wohlfahrt saw activity on Ark Royal's flight deck, which transpired to be the launching of the second, fatal attack on Bismarck. At 20:39, Wohlfahrt surfaced and transmitted, "Enemy in view, a battleship, an aircraft carrier, course 115, enemy is proceeding at high speed. Position 48° 20′ N, 16° 20′ W." Renown's and Ark Royal's course toward Bismarck coincided almost exactly with his own; he proceeded on the surface at full speed behind them.

Wohlfahrt's War Diary contains these entries for 27 May 1941:

00:00, (wind) north-west 5, seaway 5, rain squalls, moderate visibility, very dark night. Surfaced. What can I do for Bismarck? I can see star shells being fired and flashes from Bismarck's guns. It is a terrible feeling to be near and not to be able to do anything. All I can do is reconnoitre and lead in boats that have torpedoes. I am keeping contact at the limit of visibility, reporting the position, and sending directional signals to call up the other boats.

03:52: I am moving around on the east side to the south, in order to be in the direction of the activity. I soon reach the limit of what I can do in view of my fuel supply. Otherwise, I won't get home.

04:00: The seas are rising ever higher. Bismarck still fighting. Reported weather for the Luftwaffe.

Around 06:30 Wohlfahrt sighted U-74 and transferred the mission of maintaining contact with Bismarck to Kapitänleutnant Eitel-Friedrich Kentrat. He gave Kentrat Bismarck's position based on his observations of the star shells fired during the night, adding: "I have not seen her directly. You assume contact. I have no more fuel." Wohlfahrt then submerged and did not surface again until noon, a time at which radio signals were routinely repeated. That was when he heard for the first time the order radioed to him between 07:00 and 08:00 to pick up Bismarck's War Diary. He replied to the Befehlshaber der U-Boote ("Commander-in-Chief for Submarines") Karl Dönitz, asking that this mission be transferred to Kentrat, who received the radio order, "U-boat Kentrat pick up Bismarck War Diary," but was unable to locate Bismarck. The battleship had been sunk before Wohlfahrt had received the first message at noon.

U-556 arrived at Lorient, in occupied France on 30 May 1941 after 30 days at sea, where Wohlfahrt received the Knight's Cross (Ritterkreuz) from Dönitz personally.

=== Second patrol ===
U-556 departed from Lorient on 19 June 1941, and once more headed out into the Atlantic. However, on 27 June, she was sunk south-west of Iceland, in position 60°24′N 20°00′W, by depth charges from the British Flower-class corvettes HMS Nasturtium, Celandine and Gladiolus. Five of the crew were killed and 41 survived.

=== Wolfpacks ===
U-556 took part in one wolfpack, namely:

- West (10 – 20 May 1941)

== Summary of raiding history ==
Date	Ship Name	Nationality	Tonnage (GRT)	Fate
6 May 1941	Emanuel	Faroe Islands	166	Sunk
10 May 1941	Aelbryn	United Kingdom	4,986	Damaged
10 May 1941	Empire Caribou	United Kingdom	4,861	Sunk
10 May 1941	Gand	Belgium	5,086	Sunk
20 May 1941	British Security	United Kingdom	8,470	Sunk
20 May 1941	Cockaponset	United Kingdom	5,995	Sunk
20 May 1941	Darlington Court	United Kingdom	4,974	Sunk

== Bibliography ==
- Busch, Rainer; Röll, Hans-Joachim (1999). German U-boat commanders of World War II : a biographical dictionary. Translated by Brooks, Geoffrey. London, Annapolis, Md: Greenhill Books, Naval Institute Press. ISBN 1-55750-186-6.
- Busch, Rainer; Röll, Hans-Joachim (1999). Deutsche U-Boot-Verluste von September 1939 bis Mai 1945 [German U-boat losses from September 1939 to May 1945]. Der U-Boot-Krieg (in German). Vol. IV. Hamburg, Berlin, Bonn: Mittler. ISBN 3-8132-0514-2.
- Gröner, Erich; Jung, Dieter; Maass, Martin (1991). German Warships 1815–1945, U-boats and Mine Warfare Vessels. Vol. 2. Translated by Thomas, Keith; Magowan, Rachel. London: Conway Maritime Press. ISBN 0-85177-593-4.
- Kemp, Paul (1997). U-Boats Destroyed - German Submarine Losses in the World Wars. Arms & Armour. ISBN 1-85409-515-3.
