= Herbert Wohlfarth =

German navy officer

- Born: 5 June 1915; Kanazawa, Japan
- Died: 13 August 1982 (aged 67); Villingen, West Germany
- Military career
- Allegiance: Nazi Germany
- Branch: Kriegsmarine
- Service years: 1933–45
- Rank: Kapitänleutnant
- Commands: U-14, U-137, U-556
- Conflicts: World War II
- Awards: U-boat War Badge; Knight's Cross of the Iron Cross

Heinrich Wilhelm Herbert Wohlfarth (5 June 1915 – 13 August 1982) was a German naval officer and U-boat commander during World War II. He was also a recipient of the Knight's Cross of the Iron Cross (German: Ritterkreuz des Eisernen Kreuzes). The Knight's Cross of the Iron Cross, and its variants were the highest awards in the military and paramilitary forces of Nazi Germany during World War II. He can be seen on Die Deutsche Wochenschau newsreel 574 of 3 September 1941 receiving this decoration from Doenitz. The film on return from the patrol made sometime before his later capture.

== Naval career ==
Herbert Wohlfarth began his naval career in April 1933. After the usual training that he spent more than a year on the cruiser Admiral Graf Spee. In May 1937, he joined the U-boat force, and like many of the later successful commanders received a solid pre-war training under Karl Dönitz. After some months as aide-de-camp in the 3rd U-boat Flotilla, in September 1938, he became watch officer on U-16.

On 19 October 1939 Oberleutnant zur See Wohlfarth took command of U-14. On his first three patrols he sank nine mostly smaller ships in Scottish and Norwegian waters. The fourth patrol with U-14 was for him, as for most other commanders during Operation Hartmut, supporting the invasion of Norway, without success.

On 15 June 1940 Wohlfarth commissioned U-137, also a Type IID U-boat, referred to as Einbaum (dugout canoe). But these small boats were also very successful and other well-known commanders including Hardegen, Kretschmer and Lüth won their first successes in them.

Wohlfarth led U-137 on three patrols during the autumn of 1940. He sank six ships for a total of 19,557 gross register tons (GRT), mostly in the area south of the Hebrides. Especially notable was his torpedo hit on the 10,552-ton armed merchant cruiser HMS Cheshire, damaging the ship so badly that she had to spend six months in the shipyard for repairs.

On 15 December 1940 Kapitänleutnant Wohlfarth left U-137 and two months later commissioned the Type VIIC boat U-556. On his first patrol in the Atlantic with this new boat he sank six ships for a total of 29,552 GRT and damaged another of 4,986 GRT.

On 15 May 1941 he received the Knight's Cross while still on patrol. On 26 May, during the return voyage, and ten days before his 26th birthday, Wohlfahrt responded to a call for all U-boats in the Bay of Biscay to support the Bismarck's increasingly deteriorating position. The aircraft carrier HMS Ark Royal, battlecruiser Renown and battleship King George V had a lucky escape during the night, unaware they had come within firing range of Wohlfarth's U-556, which had already fired off all its torpedoes. This was particularly galling for Wohlfahrt, as U-556 and Bismarck had exercised together in the Baltic, and as Wohlfarth had jokingly created a Certificate of Sponsorship, promising to protect the Bismarck. U-556 continued to shadow the British forces, reporting their position and guiding other U-boats to the area. Wohlfarth witnessed the night battles between Bismarck and British destroyers.

== Prisoner of war ==
On 19 June 1941 Wohlfarth started his second patrol on U-556, but just eight days later his boat was sunk in the North Atlantic southwest of Iceland by the British corvettes HMS Nasturtium, Celandine and Gladiolus. He and most of his crew were captured; one officer and four men were killed.

Wohlfarth then spent more than six years in English and Canadian prisoner of war camps. His war record stood at 21 ships sunk, totalling 66,032 GRT, and three more damaged, totalling 20,455 GRT. He returned to Germany on 14 July 1947.

Wohlfarth died on 13 August 1982 in Villingen, Germany, at the age of 67 years.

== Promotions ==
- Fähnrich zur See on 1 July 1934
- Oberfähnrich zur See on 1 April 1936
- Leutnant zur See on 1 October 1936
- Oberleutnant zur See on 1 June 1938
- Kapitänleutnant on 1 October 1940

== Decorations ==
- Dienstauszeichnung 4th Class (31 March 1937)
- Iron Cross (1939)
  - 2nd Class (6 October 1939)
  - 1st Class (1 October 1940)
- Sudetenland Medal (20 December 1939)
- U-boat War Badge (1939) (20 December 1939)
- Knight's Cross of the Iron Cross on 15 May 1941 as Kapitänleutnant and commander of U-556
- War Merit Cross (Italy) (1 November 1941)

== U-boat commands ==
- Four patrols in U-14 from 19 October 1939 to 1 June 1940.
- Three patrols in U-137 from 15 June 1940 to 14 December 1940.
- Two patrols in U-556 from 6 February 1941 to 27 June 1941.
