= USS Aulick (DD-569) =

Fletcher-class destroyer

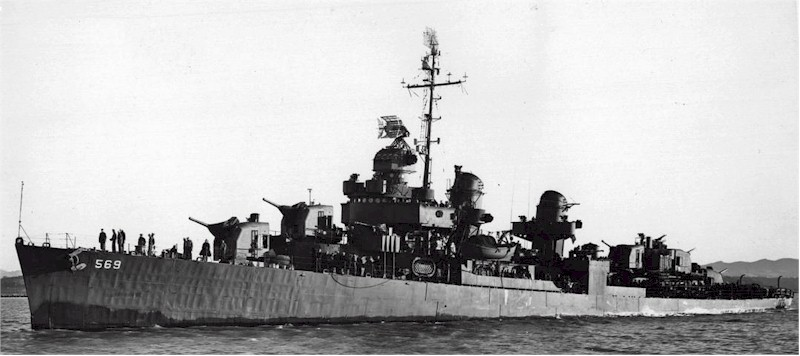
- USS Aulick off Mare Island on 24 February 1945,

History

United States
- Name: USS Aulick
- Namesake: John H. Aulick
- Builder: Consolidated Steel Corporation, Orange, Texas
- Laid down: 14 May 1941
- Launched: 2 March 1942
- Sponsored by: Mrs. Thaddeus A. Thomson
- Commissioned: 27 October 1942
- Decommissioned: 18 April 1946
- Stricken: 1 September 1975
- Identification: DD-569
- Fate: Transferred to Hellenic Navy, 21 August 1959

Greece
- Name: Sfendoni
- Acquired: 21 August 1959
- Stricken: 1991
- Identification: D85
- Fate: Scrapped, 1997

General characteristics
- Class & type: Fletcher-class destroyer
- Displacement: 2,050 tons
- Length: 376 ft 6 in (114.76 m)
- Beam: 39 ft 8 in (12.09 m)
- Draft: 17 ft 9 in (5.41 m)
- Propulsion: 60,000 shp (45,000 kW); 2 propellers
- Speed: 35 kn (65 km/h; 40 mph)
- Range: 6,500 nmi (12,000 km; 7,500 mi) at 15 kn (28 km/h; 17 mph)
- Complement: 329
- Armament: 5 x 5-inch 38 caliber guns; 4 × 40 mm AA guns, 4 × 20 mm AA guns, 10 × 21 inch (533 mm) torpedo tubes, 6 × depth charge projectors, 2 × depth charge tracks

USS Aulick (DD-569) was an American Fletcher-class destroyer, was the second ship of the United States Navy to be named for Commodore John H. Aulick (1787–1873).

== Construction and commissioning ==
Aulick was laid down on 14 May 1941 at Orange, Texas, by the Consolidated Steel Corporation; launched on 2 March 1942, sponsored by Mrs. Thaddeus A. Thomson, the wife of Captain Thaddeus A. Thomson who was then the acting commandant of the 8th Naval District; and commissioned on 27 October 1942.

== Service history ==
=== United States Navy ===
==== World War II ====
Following her commissioning, the destroyer conducted shakedown training between the Gulf of Mexico and Casco Bay Maine. On 14 December 1942 at the mouth of the Chesapeake Bay outside of Hampton Roads, VA, near the Thimble Shoals Lighthouse, she hit and sank the sloop Narada (known as the USCGR-2012) on loan to the US Coast Guard for antisubmarine duty. There was no loss of life. Her owner L. Corrin Strong was notified and compensated $6,249.80. She later departed Philadelphia on 23 January 1943, bound for the South Pacific. She transited the Panama Canal and paused at Bora Bora, Society Islands, before making Nouméa, New Caledonia, on 12 February. After a week of antisubmarine patrol off New Caledonia, Aulick joined Task Force 64 (TF 64) in the Coral Sea and stood by to support an American force landing on the Russell Islands.

When TF 64 returned to Nouméa on 25 February, Aulick was detached. She stood out for Espiritu Santo on 1 March as an escort for the aircraft transport Athene. From there, the destroyer steamed to Efate Island, New Hebrides, but on 9 March, she was ordered back to Nouméa. At 0411 on the 10th, Aulick struck a coral reef off the southern tip of New Caledonia while making 20 knots (37 km/h; 23 mph) and suffered extensive damage to her hull, propellers, and engines.

After being briefly drydocked at Nouméa, the ship was taken in tow bound for Hawaii, where she arrived on 10 April after stops at Suva, Fiji Islands, and at Pago Pago, American Samoa. The warship underwent repairs at Pearl Harbor until 8 November when she got underway for Bremerton, Washington Reaching there on 14 November, Aulick entered the Puget Sound Navy Yard for replacement of damaged machinery. She set sail on 23 December to return to Pearl Harbor. Upon reaching that port, the ship received three more weeks of availability.

===== 1944 =====
The destroyer left Hawaii on 22 January 1944, bound for the west coast, and reported to the Fleet Operational Training Command in San Francisco on 3 February. Her duties included serving as a training ship in engineering, ordnance, and deck duties. The highlight of her service during this assignment was her rescue on 11 April of 16 crewmen from a downed United States Navy PBM Mariner flying boat.

The warship was relieved on 18 May and reported to the Bethlehem Steel Shipyard, San Francisco, for repairs. At the end of this work, she sailed once again for Pearl Harbor and arrived there on 27 June. After a series of training exercises, Aulick got underway on 9 July in the screen of 12 transports bound for the invasion of Guam. They arrived off that island on 22 July, and the destroyer remained in the area, patrolling and screening units of the 5th Fleet, until 6 August.

After a resupply stop at Eniwetok, Aulick rendezvoused with Task Group 32.4 (TG 32.4) on 21 August and continued on to Guadalcanal where she spent the next three weeks preparing for upcoming operations against the Palaus. The destroyer sailed for that group of islands with TG 32.7 on 8 September, reached her destination on 15 September, and supported the forces landing on Peleliu and on Angaur.

On 30 September, the ship headed for Manus Island, Admiralty Islands, to join the 7th Fleet. She got underway for the Philippines on 12 October and arrived off Leyte on 18 October. The next day, Aulick was assigned to the northern fire support group for shore bombardment, night harassing fire, and close fire support. She entered San Pedro Bay at 0655 and opened fire at 1115. At approximately 1212, Japanese shells scored direct hits on the destroyer, killing one crewman by flying shrapnel. At 1328, she ceased fire and retired for the night. Aulick again rendered fire support on 20 and 21 October. From 22 to 24 October, she stood by but did not fire her guns.

Meanwhile, the Japanese high command had activated its plan to defend the Philippines with the Combined Fleet. Japan's warships were organized into four groups. The northern force was built around the Combined Fleet's remaining aircraft carriers, now bereft of their warplanes, and was to wait as a decoy north of Luzon. Japan hoped to lure the American Fast Carrier Task Force to a point far enough from Leyte Gulf for it to be out of action while the Emperor's other three forces, composed of surface warships, annihilated the American shipping supporting Major General Douglas MacArthur's beachhead on Leyte. Thus, they hoped to strand the American invaders on Leyte as MacArthur's soldiers had been caught on Bataan some three years before. The more powerful of these surface forces was to cross the Sibuyan Sea, transit San Bernardino Strait, and descend upon Leyte Gulf from the north. The other two were to emerge from Surigao Strait and attack the invaders in Leyte Gulf from the south.

On 25 October, Aulick was part of the screen that was protecting American battleships and cruisers guarding the waters approaching Surigao Strait. The guns of these warships defeated the first of the Japanese southern forces so decisively that the second force turned back before really getting into action. As the Japanese retreated, the American ships, including Aulick, joined in sinking a Japanese destroyer of the Akitsuki class. Before the Americans could finish off any more ships, they were ordered to return to Leyte Gulf.

Reports were received that a large Japanese force was approaching from the north. Aulick and five other destroyers took station near the south coast of Homonhon Island awaiting an attack which never materialized. On 29 October, Aulick sailed in company with TG 77.2 for Seeadler Harbor. The destroyer sortied on 17 November to meet the battleship West Virginia in Vitiaz Strait and escort her back to Seeadler. After escorting the battleship on to Ulithi, Aulick sailed back to Leyte on 22 November.

Arriving in Leyte Gulf on 25 November, Aulick once again joined TG 77.2. On 29 November, while on antisubmarine patrol in the east entrance to Leyte Gulf, Aulick was attacked at 1750 by six Japanese planes. One peeled off and dived toward the destroyer, dropped a bomb close aboard, then exploded on hitting the water approximately 20 yd (18 m) off the destroyer's port bow. Another aircraft approached and struck the starboard side of the bridge with its wingtip, continued forward and downward, and exploded near the bow just above the main deck. The explosion set the number 2 gun and handling room on fire. Metal fragments killed several men on the bridge and flying bridge. Altogether a total of 31 men were killed, 64 were wounded, and 1 was missing.

After being relieved by the destroyer Pringle, Aulick proceeded to San Pedro Bay to transfer her wounded and made emergency repairs. On 1 December, she got underway for the west coast, via Seeadler Harbor and Pearl Harbor, and entered the Mare Island Navy Yard on Christmas Eve for repairs.

===== 1945 =====
The ship began sea trials on 24 February 1945 and underwent refresher training out of San Diego, Calif. before departing the west coast on 7 March. After further training out of Pearl Harbor, the destroyer set a course on 25 March for the Philippines, via Eniwetok, Ulithi, and Kossol Roads. From Leyte, Aulick sailed on 12 April for Morotai, Netherlands East Indies. A week later, she departed for Mindanao Island with elements of the 31st Infantry Division embarked. After disembarking the invasion troops at Mindanao on 22 April, the destroyer escorted the LSTs back to Morotai and remained there through 30 April, before heading for San Pedro Bay.

=== Post war ===
After a period of upkeep, Aulick got underway for Okinawa, anchored off Hagushi beach on 16 May, and joined the antiaircraft and radar picket screen around the transports. She was destined to remain there through the end of World War II. From 24 August to 2 September, the destroyer was assigned air-sea rescue duties on the direct air lane between Okinawa and Tokyo. On 28 September, she rescued twelve crewmen from a downed B-32 Dominator.

After being relieved of her lifeguard duties, Aulick departed Okinawa on 10 September, bound for home. She touched at Pearl Harbor, transited the Panama Canal, and arrived in New York harbor on 17 October. The destroyer participated in a Presidential fleet review on 27 October and entered the New York Navy Yard on 15 November to prepare for inactivation. She was decommissioned on 18 April 1946.

==== Hellenic Navy ====
Aulick was transferred, on loan, to the government of Greece on 21 August 1959. She served in the Hellenic Navy as Sfendoni (D85) ("Slingshot").

The ship was struck from the Naval Vessel Register on 1 September 1975, and she was sold to Greece in April 1977.

Sfendoni was stricken from the Greek Navy in 1991. She was scrapped in 1997 at Aliağa, Turkey.

== Legacy ==
At the site were USS Aulick was built is a historical marker that reads:

  - On September 9, 1940, a federal contract worth $82 million was issued to the Consolidated Steel Company to construct 12 Fletcher class naval destroyers here in Orange, Texas. This and other contracts coupled with the subsequent building of major shipyard facilities along the city's riverfront lifted the city out of a prolonged and deep economic decline which began in the early 1930s with the closing of area sawmills. The community celebrated the laying of the keels of the U. S. S. Aulick and U. S. S. Charles Ausburne on May 14, 1941. The Aulick became the first naval destroyer to be built in Texas and on Texas Independence Day, March 2, 1942, it was christened and launched amid a crowd of 6,000 people. The Aulick represented the second U. S. Naval warship to be named after War of 1812 Navy veteran John H. Aulick (1787-1861). By 1946 all 12 destroyers and over four hundred other ships had been completed here at a cost of over $876 million. Orange's well-developed shipyards encouraged major companies to build plants along the riverfront. Several petrochemical and industrial Consolidated, Levingston, and Weaver converted to peacetime activities.

== Awards ==
Aulick earned five battle stars for her World War II service.
