= SS Malakand (1919) =

Cargo liner built in 1919

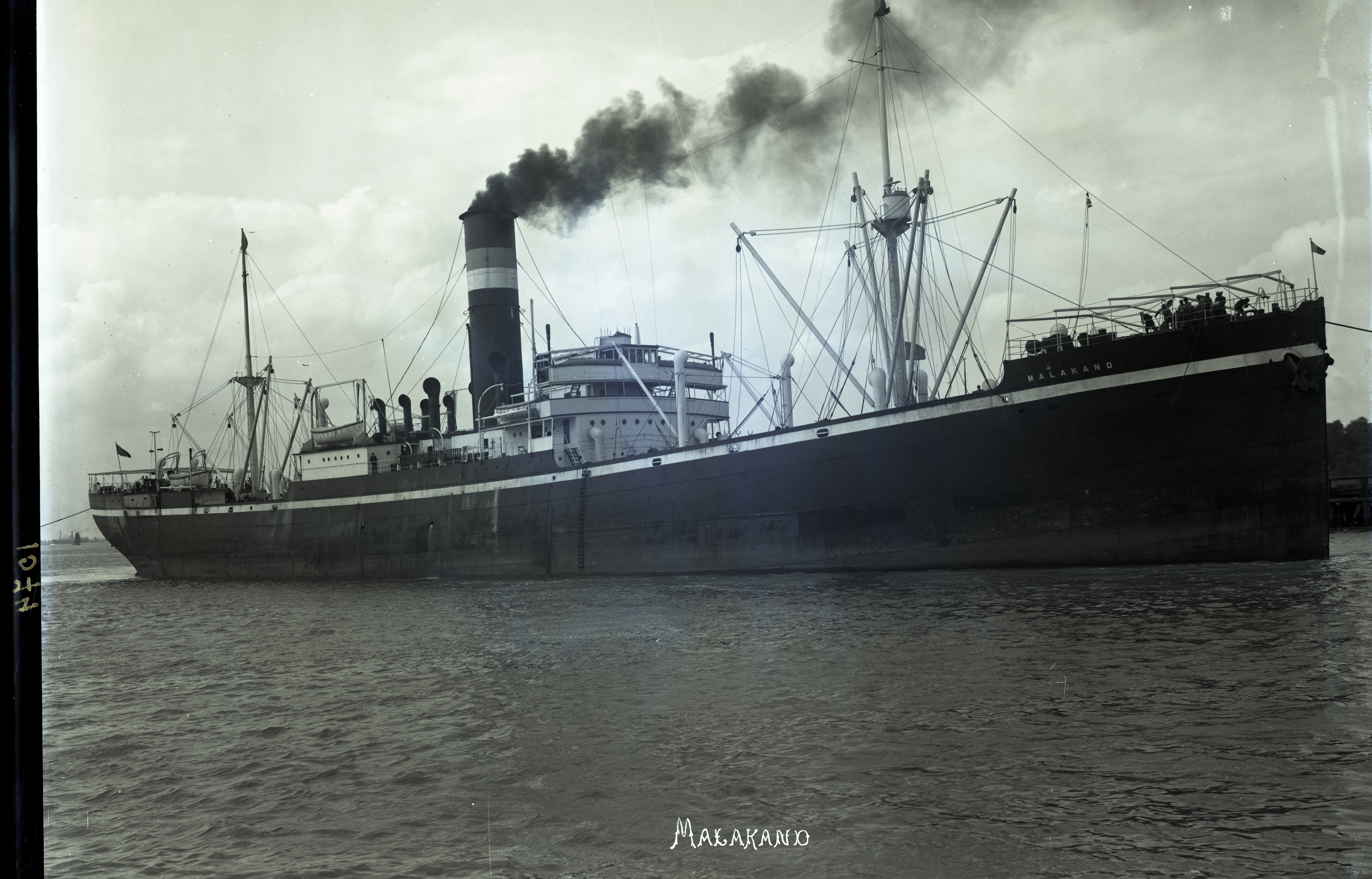

United Kingdom
- Name: Malakand
- Namesake: Malakand Agency
- Owner: Brocklebank Line
- Operator: Brocklebank Line
- Port of registry: (United Kingdom) Liverpool
- Builder: Lithgows Limited
- Yard number: 705
- Launched: 23 November 1918
- Completed: March 1919
- Acquired: March 1919
- In service: March 1919
- Out of service: 4 May 1941
- Identification: UK official number 140608; code letters JWKG; wireless call sign GSCV
- Fate: Destroyed by explosion 4 May 1941

General characteristics
- Type: Cargo liner
- Tonnage: 7,649 GRT, 4,635 NRT
- Length: 470.4 ft (143.4 m)
- Beam: 58.2 ft (17.7 m)
- Depth: 32.1 ft (9.8 m)
- Installed power: 778 NHP
- Propulsion: 1 × triple-expansion engine; 1 × screw
- Notes: sister ships: Maihar, Mahsud and Mathean

SS Malakand was a cargo liner built in 1919 for the Brocklebank Line. She was the second Brocklebank Line ship named after the Malakand area of the Indian subcontinent.

During World War II, Malakand was loaded with munitions at the Huskisson Dock in Liverpool, England, on the evening of 3 May 1941 during a heavy German air raid – a part of the city's "May Blitz" – when flames from dock sheds that had been bombed spread to her. The fire services could not contain the fire and on 4 May 1941, a few hours after the raid had ended, Malakand exploded, destroying the entire Huskisson No. 2 dock and killing four people. It took seventy-four hours for the fire to burn out.

Although the Malakand explosion is often attributed to a burning barrage balloon, the fire the balloon started was put out before it could affect the ship.
