= USS Aulick (DD-258) =

Clemson-class destroyer

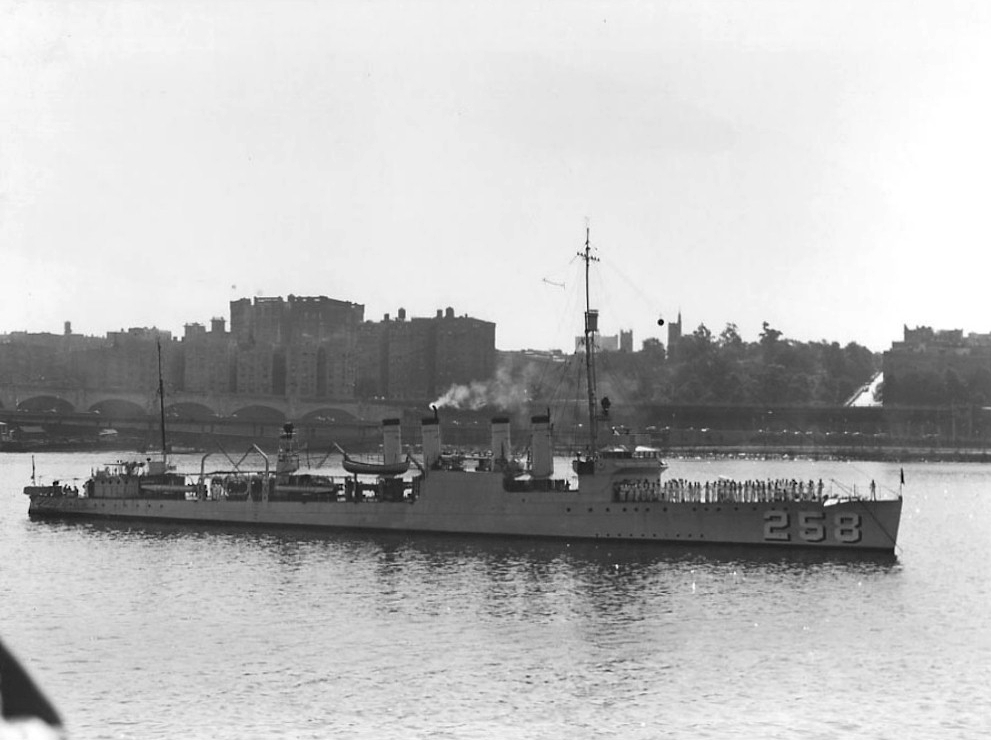
- USS Aulick in 1939-1940

History

United States
- Name: USS Aulick
- Namesake: John H. Aulick
- Builder: Bethlehem Shipbuilding Corporation, Fore River Shipyard, Quincy
- Cost: $1,219,870 (hull and machinery)
- Laid down: 3 December 1918
- Launched: 11 April 1919
- Commissioned: 26 July 1919
- Decommissioned: 8 October 1940
- Stricken: 8 January 1941
- Identification: DD-258
- Fate: Transferred to United Kingdom, 8 October 1940

United Kingdom
- Name: HMS Burnham
- Acquired: 8 October 1940
- Commissioned: 8 October 1940
- Identification: Pennant number: H82
- Fate: Sold for scrap, March 1947

General characteristics
- Class & type: Clemson-class destroyer
- Displacement: 1,308 tons
- Length: 314 feet 4 1/2 inches (95.822 m)
- Beam: 30 feet 11 1/2 inches (9.436 m)
- Draft: 9 feet 4 inches (2.84 m)
- Propulsion: 26,500 shp (19,800 kW); geared turbines, 2 screws
- Speed: 35 knots (65 km/h)
- Range: 4,900 nmi (9,100 km; 5,600 mi) at 15 kn (28 km/h; 17 mph)
- Complement: 122 officers and enlisted
- Armament: 4 x 4 in (102 mm)/50 cal. guns, 1 x 3 in (76 mm) gun; 12 x 21 inch (533 mm) torpedo tubes

The second USS Aulick (DD-258) was a Clemson-class destroyer in the United States Navy and transferred to the Royal Navy where she served as HMS Burnham (H82) during World War II.

== As USS Aulick ==
Named for John H. Aulick, Aulick was laid down on 3 December 1918 and launched on 11 April 1919 by the Bethlehem Shipbuilding Corporation; sponsored by Mrs. Phillip J. Willett. The ship was commissioned at the New York Navy Yard on 26 July 1919.

Following her shakedown cruise, Aulick proceeded to the west coast where she joined Destroyer Flotilla 10 of the Pacific Fleet. While operating along the California coast, the vessel was given the designation DD-258 on 17 July 1920. Aulick continued to carry out routine fleet duties until she was decommissioned on 27 May 1922 at the Mare Island Navy Yard.

After over 17 years laid up in reserve, the destroyer was recommissioned on 18 June 1939 at San Diego, California. Upon her reactivation, Aulick returned to the east coast where she served until the fall of 1940. On 8 October 1940, Aulick was decommissioned at Halifax, Nova Scotia, and transferred to the British under the Destroyers-for-Bases agreement with the United Kingdom. Her name was struck from the Navy list on 8 December 1941.

== As HMS Burnham ==
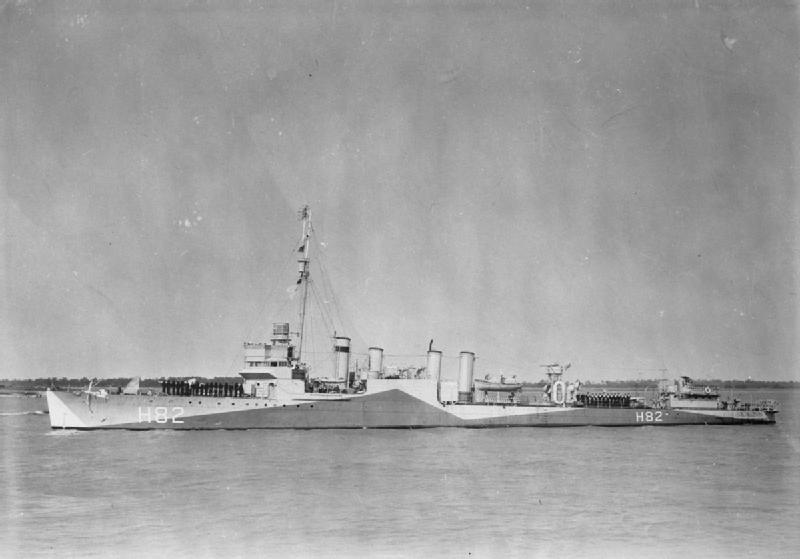
Aulick as HMS Burnham (H82)

Renamed HMS Burnham - in part in honour of Burnham, Pennsylvania and Burnham-on-Sea, Somerset - the destroyer began escort duties with the British Navy in December 1940. In early 1941, Burnham began a series of escort voyages between Iceland and Newfoundland. Burnham was modified for trade convoy escort service by removal of three of the original 4-inch (102 mm)/50 caliber guns and three of the triple torpedo tube mounts to reduce topside weight for additional depth charge stowage and installation of a Hedgehog anti-submarine mortar. Throughout 1942 and 1943, Burnham worked mainly between Newfoundland and Londonderry Port, Derry, Northern Ireland. Burnham was assigned to Escort Group C-2 of the Mid-Ocean Escort Force for convoys ON 113, HX 201, ON 119, SC 97, ON 129 and SC 102 and then to Escort Group C-3 for convoys ON 152, HX 221, ON 163, HX 226, ON 172, SC 124, ON 180 and HX 238 during the winter of 1942-43.

In 1942, Burnham was formally adopted by Burnham-On-Sea, Somerset, and after woollen comforts were gratefully received by the crew on board the ship from time to time. In 1944, she was used on aircraft training duties in the Western Approaches Command, which allowed a contingent from the ship to visit the Somerset town and march the streets.

Burnham was reduced to reserve at Milford Haven, Wales, in November 1944. She was ultimately scrapped at Pembroke, Wales, in December 1948.

On Thursday 21 October 2004, exactly 60 years after the crew of the vessel marched through the streets of the Somerset town to cheering crowds, Ron Giles, president of the former HMS Burnham Association, unveiled a plaque on the seawall of Burnham-on-Sea.
