= SS Benvrackie =

SS Benvrackie has been the name of five Ben Line merchant ships, named after Ben Vrackie, a mountain in Scotland.

- SS Maartensdijk, built in 1902 as Rapallo, named Benvrackie from 1923 to 1927
- SS Dongarra, built in 1906, renamed Benvrackie in 1927, scrapped in 1931
- SS Davian, built in 1922, renamed Benvrackie in 1939, sunk in 1941
- SS Samaffric, built in 1944, named Benvrackie from 1947 to 1952
- SS Benvrackie, steam turbine ship built in 1955, scrapped in 1975
