= HMS Imperial =

Destroyer of the Royal Navy

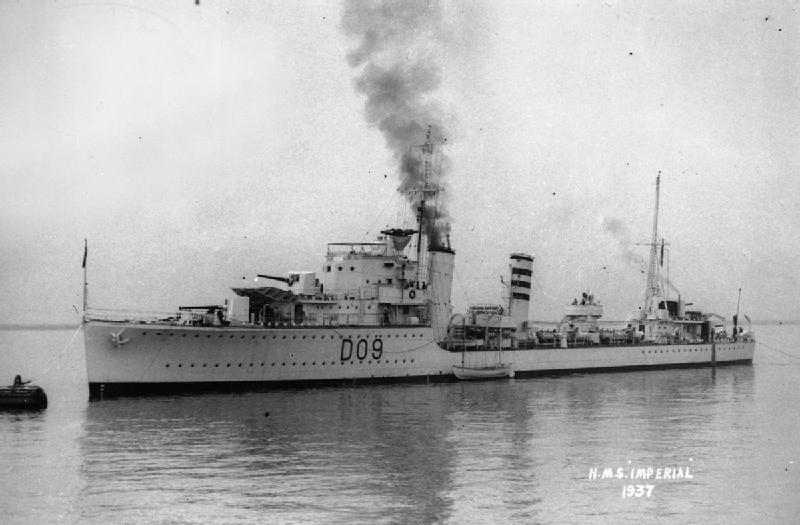
- HMS Imperial in September 1937, wearing the three black bands of the 3rd Destroyer Flotilla on her aft funnel

History

United Kingdom
- Name: Imperial
- Ordered: 30 October 1935
- Builder: Hawthorn Leslie and Company
- Cost: £257,117
- Laid down: 22 January 1936
- Launched: 11 December 1936
- Commissioned: 30 June 1937
- Identification: Pennant number: D09/I09
- Motto: Deum cole Regem serva; ("Honour God, Serve the King")
- Honours and awards: Atlantic 1939; Mediterranean; Norway 1940; Crete 1941
- Fate: Scuttled, 29 May 1941
- Badge: On a Field Purple, two sceptres in saltire, surrmounted by an orb gold.

General characteristics (as built)
- Class & type: I-class destroyer
- Displacement: 1,370 long tons (1,390 t) (standard); 1,888 long tons (1,918 t) (deep load)
- Length: 323 ft (98.5 m)
- Beam: 33 ft (10.1 m)
- Draught: 12 ft 6 in (3.8 m)
- Installed power: 3 Admiralty 3-drum boilers; 34,000 shp (25,000 kW)
- Propulsion: 2 shafts, 2 geared steam turbines
- Speed: 35.5 knots (65.7 km/h; 40.9 mph)
- Range: 5,500 nmi (10,200 km; 6,300 mi) at 15 knots (28 km/h; 17 mph)
- Complement: 145
- Sensors & processing systems: ASDIC
- Armament: 4 × single 4.7 in (120 mm) guns; 2 × quadruple 0.5-inch (12.7 mm) machine guns; 2 × quintuple 21 in (533 mm) torpedo tubes; 1 × rack and 2 throwers for 16 depth charges

Service record
- Commanders: Lt.Cmdr. Charles Arthur de Winton Kitcat
- Operations: Norwegian Campaign; Malta Convoys; Battle of Crete

HMS Imperial was one of nine I-class destroyers built for the Royal Navy during the 1930s. She was scuttled by HMS Hotspur in 1941 after she had been crippled by Italian bombers.

== Description ==
The I-class ships were improved versions of the preceding H-class. They displaced 1,370 long tons (1,390 t) at standard load and 1,888 long tons (1,918 t) at deep load. The ships had an overall length of 323 feet (98.5 m), a beam of 33 feet (10.1 m) and a draught of 12 feet 6 inches (3.8 m). They were powered by two Parsons geared steam turbines, each driving one propeller shaft, using steam provided by three Admiralty three-drum boilers. The turbines developed a total of 34,000 shaft horsepower (25,000 kW) and were intended to give a maximum speed of 35.5 knots (65.7 km/h; 40.9 mph). Icarus reached a speed of 35.1 knots (65.0 km/h; 40.4 mph) from 33,880 shp (25,260 kW) during her sea trials. The ships carried enough fuel oil to give them a range of 5,500 nautical miles (10,200 km; 6,300 mi) at 15 knots (28 km/h; 17 mph). Their crew numbered 145 officers and ratings.

The ships mounted four 4.7-inch (120 mm) Mark IX guns in single mounts, designated 'A', 'B', 'X' and 'Y' from bow to stern. For anti-aircraft (AA) defence, they had two quadruple mounts for the 0.5 inch Vickers Mark III machine gun. The I class was fitted with two above-water quintuple torpedo tube mounts amidships for 21-inch (533 mm) torpedoes. One depth charge rack and two throwers were fitted; 16 depth charges were originally carried, but this increased to 35 shortly after the war began. The I-class ships were fitted with the ASDIC sound detection system to locate submarines underwater.

== Construction and career ==
The ship was ordered under the 1935 Build Programme from Hawthorn Leslie, Hebburn, on 30 October 1935 with a delivery date of 30 April 1937. The ship was laid down on 26 January 1936 and launched on 11 December the same year, and was the first RN warship to carry the name. Imperial was completed late, on 30 June 1937, after a delay in the delivery of the gun mountings. The contract price was £257,117 excluding items supplied by Admiralty such as guns and communication equipment.

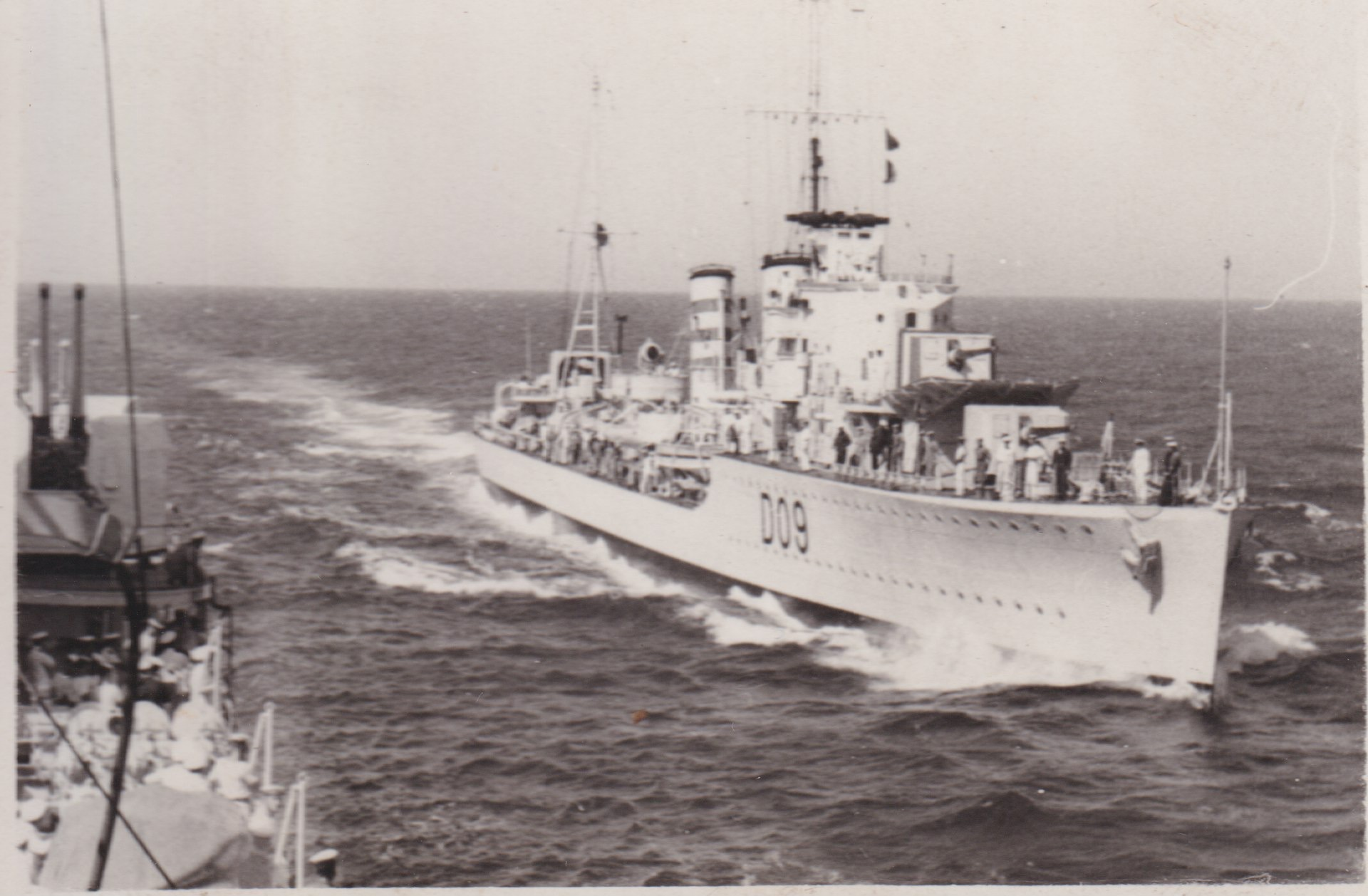
HMS Imperial, 1938

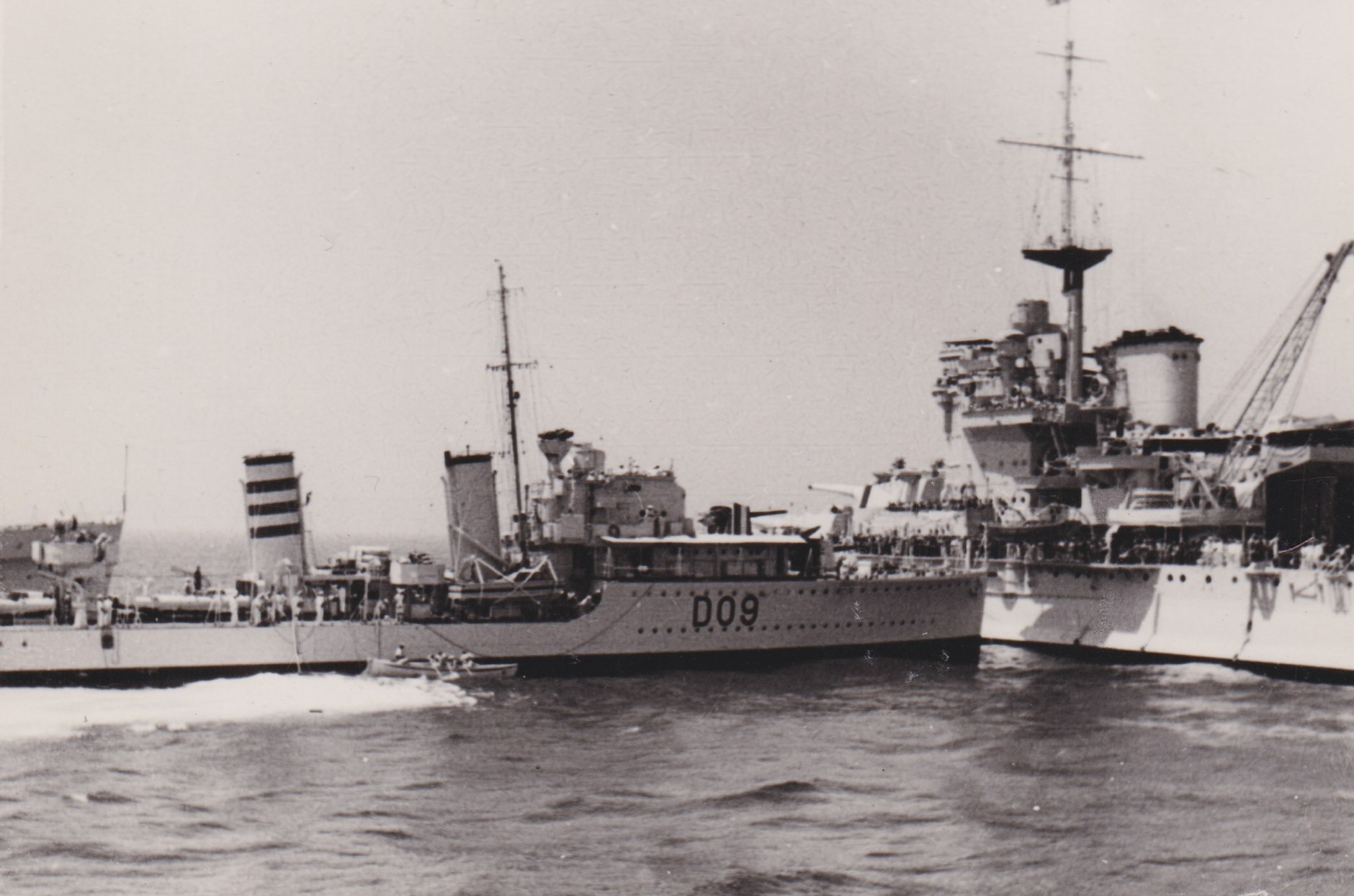
HMS Imperial, 1938

Imperial took part in the Norwegian Campaign and in August 1940 was redeployed to escort convoys to Malta. On 28 May 1941, Italian bombers from 41 Gruppo attacked Imperial and inflicted severe damage. Once it was ascertained that the vessel was damaged beyond repair, she was scuttled 55 nautical miles (102 km; 63 mi) east of Kassos.

== Bibliography ==
- Colledge, J. J.; Warlow, Ben (2006) [1969]. Ships of the Royal Navy: The Complete Record of All Fighting Ships of the Royal Navy from the 15th Century to the Present (3rd Rev ed.). London: Chatham Publishing. ISBN 978-1-86176-281-8. OCLC 67375475.
- English, John (1993). Amazon to Ivanhoe: British Standard Destroyers of the 1930s. Kendal, England: World Ship Society. ISBN 0-905617-64-9.
- Friedman, Norman (2006). British Destroyers & Frigates: The Second World War and After. Annapolis, Maryland: Naval Institute Press. ISBN 1-86176-137-6.
- Hodges, Peter & Friedman, Norman (1979). Destroyer Weapons of World War 2. Greenwich: Conway Maritime Press. ISBN 978-0-85177-137-3.
- Lenton, H. T. (1998). British & Empire Warships of the Second World War. Annapolis, Maryland: Naval Institute Press. ISBN 1-55750-048-7.
- March, Edgar J. (1966). British Destroyers: A History of Development, 1892-1953; Drawn by Admiralty Permission From Official Records & Returns, Ships' Covers & Building Plans. London: Seeley Service. OCLC 164893555.
- Rohwer, Jürgen (2005). Chronology of the War at Sea 1939–1945: The Naval History of World War Two (Third Revised ed.). Annapolis, Maryland: Naval Institute Press. ISBN 1-59114-119-2.
- Whitley, M. J. (1988). Destroyers of World War Two: An International Encyclopedia. Annapolis, Maryland: Naval Institute Press. ISBN 0-87021-326-1.
