= John H. Aulick =

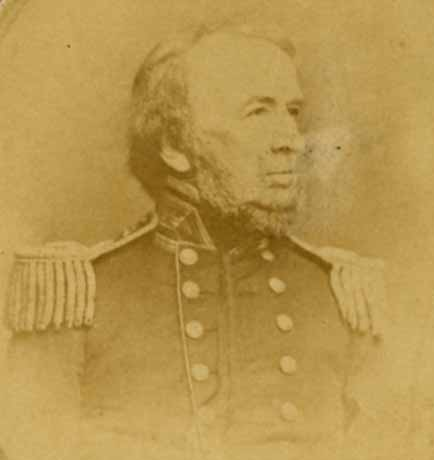
- Born: Ca. 1787-1791; Winchester, Virginia, US
- Died: 27 April 1873; Washington, D.C., US
- Occupation: United States Navy officer
- Years active: 1809–1861
- Spouse: Mary Conover Aulick
- Children: 6
- Parent(s): Charles Aulick, Ann Mary Wetzel Aulick

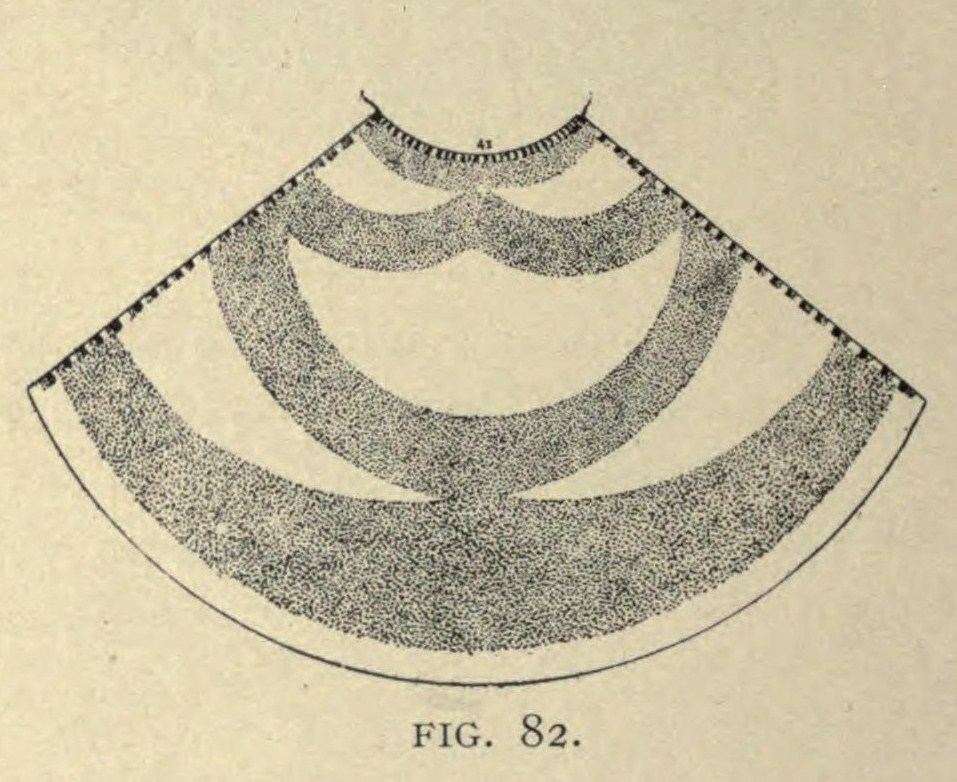
Feather cloak given to Aulick by King Kamehameha III in 1841.

John Henry Aulick (1787–1791 – 27 April 1873) was an officer in the United States Navy whose service extended from the War of 1812 to the end of the antebellum era.

== Background ==
Born in Winchester, Virginia, Aulick was appointed a midshipman on 15 November 1809. During the War of 1812, he served in Enterprise and took part in her battle with HMS Boxer on 4 September 1813. After that engagement ended in an American victory, Aulick served as prize master of the prize. Following the war, he served in Saranac, Ontario, Brandywine, Constitution, and Vincennes.

From 1851 to 1852, Aulick commanded the East India Squadron but was forced to give up command of the projected Japanese expedition to Commodore Matthew C. Perry. This was the result of quarrels during the first leg of his journey with the captain of the flagship and of an incident with a Brazilian diplomat on board.

Aulick retired in 1861 and died at Washington, D.C., on 27 April 1873.

Two ships have been named USS Aulick for him.

Military offices
Preceded by Philip Voorhees	Commander, East India Squadron; 31 May 1851–20 November 1852	Succeeded by Matthew C. Perry
