= SS Empire Caribou =

World War II merchant ship of the United Kingdom

History
- Name: Waterbury (1919–20); Northern Star (1920–23); Defacto (1923–40); Empire Caribou (1940–41)
- Owner: United States Shipping Board (1919–20); American Star Line Inc. (1921–23); American Sugar Transport Corp (1923–40); Ministry of War Transport (1940–41)
- Operator: United States Shipping Board (1919–20); American Star Line Inc. (1921–23); American Sugar Transport Corp (1923–40); Sir William Reardon Smith & Sons Ltd (1940–41)
- Port of registry: (United States) New York (1919–40); (United Kingdom) London (1940–41)
- Builder: Downey Shipbuilding Corp
- Yard number: 10
- Launched: 23 July 1919
- Completed: November 1919
- Identification: Code Letters LTKH (1923–34); Code Letters KOKC (1933–41); Code Letters GQBN (1940–41); United States Official Number 219134 (1919–40); United Kingdom Official Number 167431 (1940–41)
- Fate: Torpedoed and sunk, 10 May 1941.

General characteristics
- Tonnage: 4,800 GRT (1919–40); 4,861 GRT (1940–41); 2,999 NRT (1919–40); 2,994 NRT (1940–41); 7,814 DWT
- Length: 386 ft 8 in (117.86 m)
- Beam: 52 ft 2 in (15.90 m)
- Depth: 27 ft 4 in (8.33 m)
- Installed power: Triple expansion steam engine
- Propulsion: Screw propeller
- Speed: 10 knots (19 km/h)
- Crew: 41, plus 4 DEMS gunners (Empire Caribou)

Location of the sinking of Empire Caribou.

Empire Caribou was a 4,861 GRT cargo ship which was built in 1919 for the United States Shipping Board (USSB) as Waterbury. She was sold in 1920 to the American Star Line and renamed Northern Star. In 1923, she was sold to American Sugar Transporters Inc and renamed Defacto. In 1941 she was passed to the Ministry of War Transport (MoWT) and renamed Empire Caribou. On 10 May 1941, she was torpedoed and sunk by U-556.

== Description ==
The ship was built by Downey Shipbuilding Corporation, Arlington, New York, as yard number 10. She was launched in 1919, and completed in November that year.

The ship was 386 feet 8 inches (117.86 m) long, with a beam of 52 feet 2 inches (15.90 m) and a depth of 27 feet 4 inches (8.33 m). Her GRT was 4,800, with a NRT of 2,999. Her DWT was 7,814. In 1940, her GRT was recorded as 4,861 and her NRT as 2,994.

She was propelled by a triple expansion steam engine, which had cylinders of 24 inches (61 cm), 40 inches (100 cm) and 70 inches (180 cm) diameter and 48 inches (120 cm) stroke. The ship could make 10 knots (19 km/h).

== History ==
Waterbury was built for the USSB. She was launched on 23 July 1919. The United States Official Number 219134 was allocated. In 1920 she was sold to the American Star Line Inc and renamed Northern Star. In 1923, she was sold to American Sugar Transporters Inc and renamed Defacto. The Code Letters LTKB were allocated. In 1934, her Code Letters were changed to KOKC. On 18 March 1940, Defacto was given to the United Kingdom. She was passed to the MoWT and renamed Empire Caribou. The United Kingdom Official Number 167431 and the Code Letters GQBN were allocated.

Empire Caribou was a member of a number of convoys during the Second World War.

=== SC 25 ===
Convoy SC 25 departed Halifax, Nova Scotia on 10 March 1941 and arrived at Liverpool on 29 March. Empire Caribou was carrying a cargo of steel bound for London.

=== OB318 ===
Convoy OB 318 departed Liverpool on 2 May 1941 and arrived at Halifax on 10 May. Empire Caribou was carrying a cargo of 2,020 tons of chalk and was bound for Boston, Massachusetts. On 10 May, she was torpedoed and sunk by U-556 at 59°28′N 35°44′W, with the loss of 29 members of her 40-member crew. Eleven survivors were rescued by HMS Malcolm. They were landed at Reykjavík, Iceland and transferred to HMS Scimitar which took them to Greenock. Those lost on Empire Caribou are commemorated at the Tower Hill Memorial, London.
