= Operation Doppelschlag =

1942 German plan

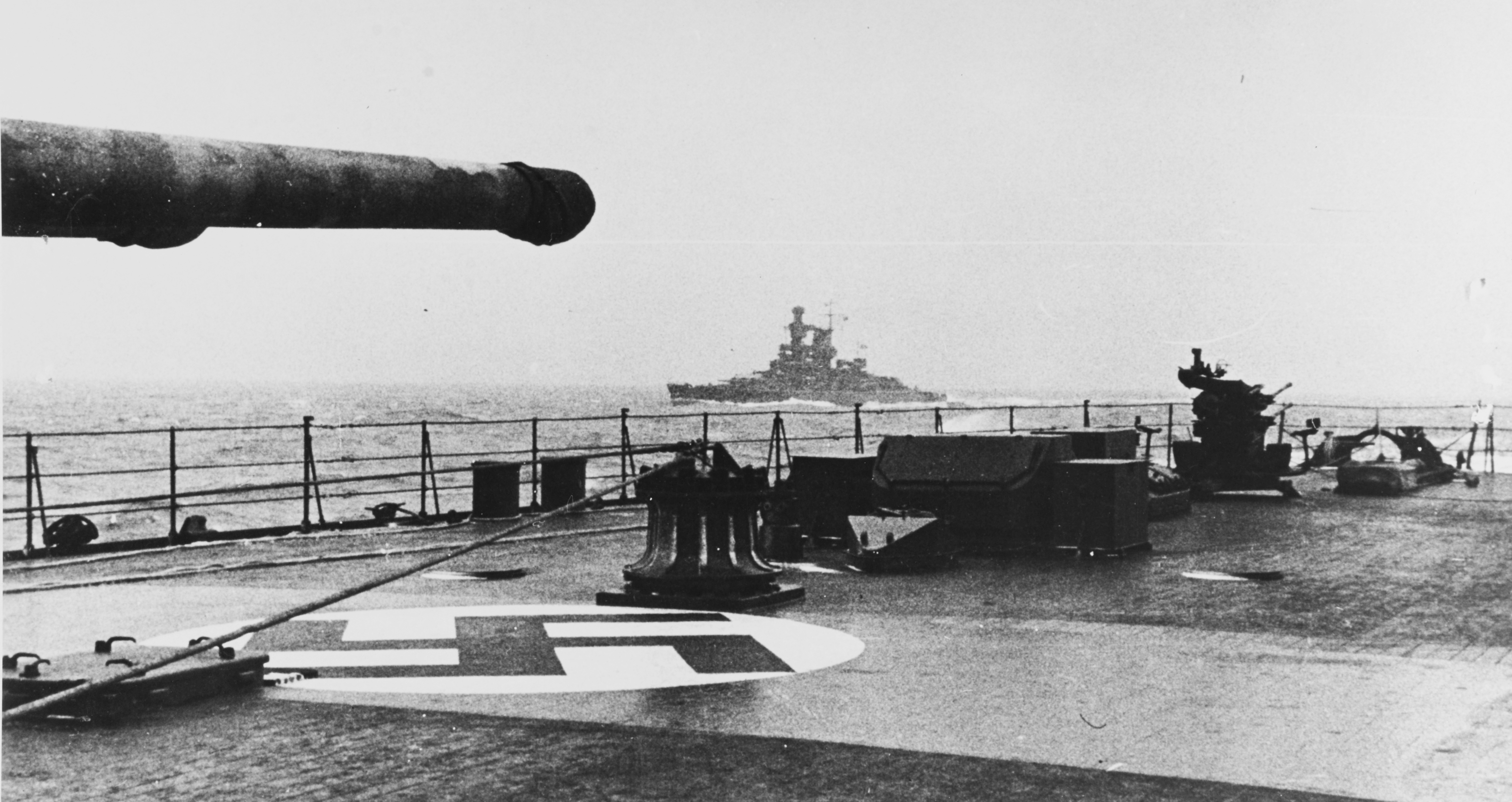
- Admiral Scheer, photographed in early 1942
- Type: Sortie
- Location: Arctic Ocean
- Planned: 1942
- Planned by: Kriegsmarine
- Commanded by: Oskar Kummetz; Otto Ciliax
- Target: Convoy PQ 18
- Outcome: Cancelled

Operation Doppelschlag (Operation Double Blow/Unternehmen Doppelschlag) was a German plan during the Second World War for a sortie in 1942 into the Arctic Ocean by the Kriegsmarine. The operation followed Unternehmen Rösselsprung, against Convoy PQ 17 in July 1942 to attack Convoy PQ 18 the next Arctic convoy by the Western Allies.

== Background ==
Following the success of the operation against Convoy PQ 17 (27 June – 10 July 1942) the Kriegsmarine was keen to repeat the victory. A plan was made to bring a powerful force of cruisers and destroyers against the next PQ convoy, to destroy it.

The Admiralty wished to avoid running another convoy in the continuous daylight of the Arctic summer and deferred passage of Convoy PQ 18 and the reciprocal Convoy QP 14 until later in the year. The German forces spent over two months at readiness before the convoys sailed in early September 1942.

=== Plan ===
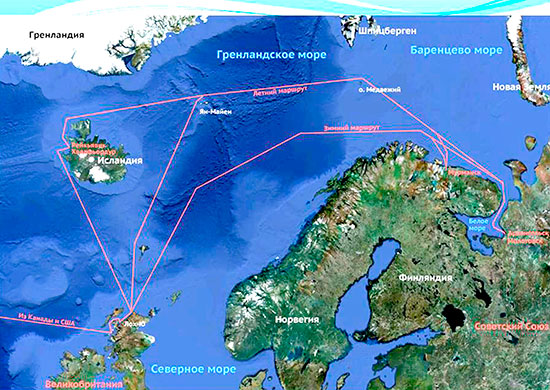
Russian map showing Arctic convoy routes from Britain and Iceland, past Norway to the Barents Sea and northern Russian ports

A patrol line of U-boats (wolfpack Eispalast (Ice Palace) was stationed in the Norwegian Sea to give early warning of a convoy. The ships of Unternehmen Doppelschlag would be waiting in readiness at their bases. Once the convoy was detected the ships would sail north to Altafjord and lie in wait. The risk of losing a capital ship in an engagement with the Allied fleet meant that only Hitler could give permission for the second stage, a sortie into the Barents Sea. Once out, the ships would divide into two battle groups to attack the convoy from different sides.

It was envisaged that the first group would engage and draw off any big ships with the convoy and the second group would attack the merchant ships while their escorts were distracted. It was this intended double blow that inspired the operational name. The ships intended to take part in the operation were the Admiral Scheer, Admiral Hipper, Köln and six destroyers. Other German capital ships in Norway, Tirpitz and Lützow were not available for the operation as both had been under repair since the end of Rosselsprung.

== Prelude ==
On 17 July, Grand Admiral Erich Raeder was informed that Adolf Hitler was becoming even more reluctant to allow the big ships in Norway to be used against Arctic convoys. Pleased, as Hitler was, of the arrival of Köln at Trondheim, it was to be kept for defensive operations only, even though a defensive strategy would be difficult for the crews of the big ships.

== Operation ==
Convoy PQ 18 sailed from Iceland on 7 September 1942. It was sighted on 8 September by a long-range reconnaissance aircraft and again on 10 September by an Eispalast U-boat. On 10 September, the ships involved in Doppelschlag departed Narvik to move north to Altenfjord. The German ships were sighted by British submarines and Tigris mounted an abortive attack. The ships arrived at Altenfjord early the following day. The Doppelschlag commanders, Vice-Admiral Oskar Kummetz in Scheer and Vice Admiral Otto Ciliax ashore, pressed for permission to begin the sortie but Hitler's insistence that no damage should befall the ships so restricted their freedom of action that Admiral Erich Raeder, the professional head of the Kriegsmarine, cancelled the operation. The attack on Convoy PQ 18 was left to the Luftwaffe and the U-boat arm.

== Aftermath ==
=== Analysis ===
The German surface fleet had little effect on the passage of Convoy PQ 18, though its latent threat forced the commitment of many Allied vessels to Operation EV, the escort operation. The British thought that the failure of the German ships to attack the convoy was caused by their measures to defeat a sortie. In his report, Admiral Tovey wrote that the German ships remained at Altenfiord for several reasons. The strength of the fighting destroyer escort acted as a deterrent, as did the presence of British submarines off the Norwegian coast, German knowledge of Operation Orator, the Search and Strike Force of torpedo-bombers based at Vaenga, the continuous reconnaissance by RAF aircraft of the German anchorages and the awareness of the Home Fleet heading north-east on 12 September.

In 1977, the British historian Peter Smith wrote that the German decision not to commit the ships to an attack on Convoy PQ 18 had been taken weeks before the convoy sailed based on the German analysis of the operation against Convoy PQ 17. The Luftwaffe claimed the sinking of a cruiser, a destroyer, two escort ships and 22 merchant ships and the U-boats claimed 16 ships of 113,963 GRT and cut the Luftwaffe total to twenty ships and 131,000 GRT. Colonel-General Hans-Jürgen Stumpff, the commander of Luftflotte 5, claimed that his aircraft has sunk 142,216 GRT of shipping but Convoy PQ 17 lost eight ships to air attack, nine to U-boats and seven to attacks by both. The Germans did not know that the convoy had been scattered against an attack by ships; the Luftwaffe thought that its attacks had caused the convoy to scatter and this mistaken impression affected later German plans.

=== Subsequent operations ===
The next opportunity for an attack by German surface ships came in December, when Unternehmen Regenbogen (Operation Rainbow), following a similar plan to Doppelschlag, was mounted against Convoy JW 51B, leading to the Battle of the Barents Sea.

== German order of battle ==
=== Kriegsmarine ===
Ships in the Unternehmen Doppelschlag plan
Name	Flag	Class	Notes
Ships
Admiral Scheer	Kriegsmarine	Deutschland-class cruiser	
Admiral Hipper	Kriegsmarine	Admiral Hipper-class cruiser	
Köln	Kriegsmarine	Königsberg-class cruiser	
Z4 Richard Beitzen	Kriegsmarine	Type 1934-class destroyer	
Z16 Friedrich Eckoldt	Kriegsmarine	Type 1934A-class destroyer	
Z23	Kriegsmarine	Type 1936A-class destroyer	
Z27	Kriegsmarine	Type 1936A-class destroyer	
Z29	Kriegsmarine	Type 1936A-class destroyer	
Z30	Kriegsmarine	Type 1936A-class destroyer	
Wolfpack gruppe Eispalast (Ice Palace)
U-88	Kriegsmarine	Type VIIC submarine	Sunk by Faulknor
U-255	Kriegsmarine	Type VIIC submarine	
U-377	Kriegsmarine	Type VIIC submarine	
U-378	Kriegsmarine	Type VIIC submarine	
U-403	Kriegsmarine	Type VIIC submarine	
U-405	Kriegsmarine	Type VIIC submarine	
U-408	Kriegsmarine	Type VIIC submarine	Sank Stalingrad
U-435	Kriegsmarine	Type VIIC submarine	
U-457	Kriegsmarine	Type VIIC submarine	Damaged Atheltemplar, sunk Impulsive
U-589	Kriegsmarine	Type VIIC submarine	Sank Oliver Ellsworth, sunk by Onslow
U-592	Kriegsmarine	Type VIIC submarine	
U-703	Kriegsmarine	Type VIIC submarine	

=== Luftwaffe ===
Luftflotte 5
Unit	Flag	Type	Base	Notes
Kampfgeschwader 30	Luftwaffe	Junkers Ju 88	Banak	Bomber
Kampfgeschwader 26	Luftwaffe	Junkers Ju 88, Heinkel 111	Banak, Bardufoss	Torpedo-bomber
I./Sturzkampfgeschwader 5	Luftwaffe	Junkers Ju 87	Kirkenes	Dive-bomber
Jagdgeschwader 5	Luftwaffe	Messerschmitt Bf 109		Fighter
I./Kampfgeschwader 40	Luftwaffe	Focke-Wulf Fw 200 Kondor	Trondheim, Tromsø, Stavanger	Long-range reconnaissance
1./Küstenfliegergruppe 406	Luftwaffe	Heinkel He 115, BV 138	Tromsø/Søreisa	Reconnaissance, torpedo-bomber
I./Küstenfliegergruppe 906	Luftwaffe	Heinkel He 115, BV 138	Stavanger	Reconnaissance, torpedo-bomber
1./Fernaufklärungsgruppe 22	Luftwaffe	Junkers Ju 88	Banak, Bardufoss, Kirkenes	Reconnaissance
1./Fernaufklärungsgruppe 124	Luftwaffe	Junkers Ju 88	Banak, Bardufoss, Kirkenes	Reconnaissance

== Bibliography ==
- Blair, Clay (2000) [1996]. Hitler's U-boat War: The Hunters 1939–1942. Vol. I. London: Cassell. ISBN 978-0-304-35260-9.
- Boyd, Andrew (2024). Arms for Russia & the Naval War in the Arctic 1941–1945. Barnsley: Seaforth (Pen & Sword). ISBN 978-1-3990-3886-7.
- Kemp, Paul (1993). Convoy! Drama in Arctic Waters. London: Arms and Armour Press. ISBN 978-1-85409-130-7.
- Rohwer, Jürgen; Hümmelchen, Gerhard (2005). Chronology of the War at Sea 1939–1945: The Naval History of World War Two (3rd rev. ed.). Annapolis, Maryland: Naval Institute Press. ISBN 1-59114-119-2.
- Schofield, Bernard (1964). The Russian Convoys. London: BT Batsford. OCLC 862623.
- Smith, Peter (1975). Arctic Victory: The Story of Convoy PQ 18. London: William Kimber. ISBN 0-7183-0074-2.
- Smith, Peter (1977) [1975]. Convoy PQ18: Arctic Victory. London: New English Library. ISBN 978-0-7183-0074-6.
