= List of shipwrecks in international waters =

This is a list of shipwrecks located in international waters.

== Arctic Ocean ==
Ship	Flag	Sunk date	Notes	Coordinates
USS Jeannette	United States Navy	13 June 1881	A Philomel-class gunboat that was converted into an Arctic exploration vessel, and became trapped in the ice near Wrangel Island. The ship remained trapped for 21 months, and was carried some distance northeast before sinking; three of the De Long Islands were discovered and named by her crew along the way.	77°15′N 154°59′E

=== Barents Sea ===
Ship	Flag	Sunk date	Notes	Coordinates
HMS Achates	Royal Navy	31 December 1942	An A-class destroyer that was sunk 135 nautical miles southeast of Bear Island, in the Battle of the Barents Sea.	73°18′N 30°6′E
RFA Aldersdale	Royal Navy	7 July 1942	A Dale-class oil tanker that was damaged by aircraft and sunk by U-457.	75°0′N 45°0′E
SS Andrew G. Curtin	United States	26 January 1944	A Liberty ship that was torpedoed by U-716.	73°22′N 24°15′E
HMS Bickerton	Royal Navy	22 August 1944	A Buckley-class destroyer escort that was torpedoed by U-354 and scuttled.	71°42′N 19°11′E
BO-229	Soviet Navy	7 December 1944	A SC-497 class submarine chaser that was sunk by U-997. Originally the USS SC-1485 for the United States Navy before being lend-leased to the Soviet Navy on 8 July 1944.	69°28′N 34°19′E
BO-230	Soviet Navy	5 December 1944	A SC-497 class submarine chaser that was sunk by U-365. Originally the USS SC-1477 for the United States Navy before being lend-leased to the Soviet Navy on 19 July 1944.	69°29′N 35°12′E
SS Daniel Morgan	United States	5 July 1942	A Liberty ship that was torpedoed by U-88.	75°08′N 45°06′E
HMS Edinburgh	Royal Navy	2 May 1942	A Town-class light cruiser that was scuttled 400 kilometres northeast of Kola Bay, Russia.	72°N 35°E
SS Edward H. Crockett	United States	29 September 1944	A Liberty ship that was torpedoed by U-310.	72°59′N 24°26′E
SS Empire Byron	United Kingdom	5 July 1942	A cargo ship that was torpedoed by U-703.	76°18′N 33°30′E
SS Empire Cowper	United Kingdom	11 April 1942	A cargo ship that was bombed by German aircraft.	71°01′N 36°00′E
SS El Occidente	United States	13 April 1942	A cargo ship that was torpedoed by U-435.	73.2°N 28.3°E
Z16 Friedrich Eckoldt	Kriegsmarine	31 December 1942	A Type 1934A-class destroyer that was sunk by HMS Sheffield in the Battle of the Barents Sea.	77°19′N 30°47′E
FV Gaul	United Kingdom	8–9 February 1974	A British fishing vessel that disappeared without trace; the wreck was not discovered until 1997.	
HMS Goodall	Royal Navy	29 April 1945	A Captain class frigate that was scuttled the following day after being torpedoed by U-286.	69°25′N 33°38′E
M-175	Soviet Navy	10 January 1942	A Soviet M-class submarine that was sunk by U-584.	70°09′N 32°50′E
HMS Matabele	Royal Navy	17 January 1942	A Tribal class destroyer that was torpedoed by U-454.	69°21′N 35°27′E
SS Thomas Scott	United States	17 February 1945	A Liberty ship that was torpedoed by U-968.	69°30′N 34°42′E
HMS Trinidad	Royal Navy	15 May 1942	A Crown Colony-class cruiser that was attacked by German bombers and scuttled north of North Cape, Norway.	73°37′N 23°27′E
SM U-28	Kriegsmarine	2 September 1917	A Type U 27 U-boat that attacked the SS Olive Branch at close range, 85 miles northeast of North Cape, Norway. The gunfire detonated the Olive Branch's cargo of munitions, and the U-boat was sunk in the resultant explosion.	72°34′N 27°56′E
U-288	Kriegsmarine	3 April 1944	A Type VIIC U-boat that was sunk by British aircraft southeast of Bear Island.	73°44′N 27°12′E
U-314	Kriegsmarine	30 January 1944	A Type VIIC U-boat that was sunk by HMS Whitehall and HMS Meteor southeast of Bear Island.	73°41′N 24°30′E
U-354	Kriegsmarine	24 August 1944	A Type VIIC U-boat that was sunk by British ships northeast of North Cape.	72°49′N 30°41′E
U-425	Kriegsmarine	17 February 1945	A Type VIIC U-boat that was sunk by HMS Lark and HMS Alnwick Castle near Murmansk, Russia.	69°39′N 35°50′E
U-457	Kriegsmarine	16 September 1942	A Type VIIC U-boat that was sunk by HMS Impulsive northeast of Murmansk, Russia.	75°05′N 43°15′E
U-472	Kriegsmarine	4 March 1943	A Type VIIC U-boat that was sunk by HMS Onslaught and British aircraft southeast of Bear Island.	73°05′N 26°40′E
U-585	Kriegsmarine	30 March 1942	A Type VIIC U-boat that was sunk by a German mine north of Murmansk, Russia.	70°00′N 34°00′E
U-589	Kriegsmarine	14 September 1942	A Type VIIC U-boat that was sunk by HMS Onslow and a British aircraft.	75°40′N 20°32′E
U-655	Kriegsmarine	24 March 1942	A Type VIIC U-boat that was rammed by HMS Sharpshooter.	73°00′N 21°00′E

=== Greenland Sea ===
Ship	Flag	Sunk date	Notes	Coordinates
RFA Gray Ranger	Royal Navy	22 September 1942	A fleet support tanker that was torpedoed by U-435.	70°N 11°W
Hinrich Freese	Kriegsmarine	12 November 1940	A weather ship that was deliberately run aground on Jan Mayen to prevent capture.	
Lauenburg	Kriegsmarine	28 June 1941	A German weather ship that was captured and scuttled by four Allied warships, in order to acquire important codebooks and parts of an Enigma machine.	71°00′N 8°20′W
SS Oliver Ellsworth	United States	13 September 1942	A Liberty ship that was torpedoed by U-408 about 100 miles southwest of Spitsbergen, Norway.	75°52′N 7°55′E
SS Santa Rosa	United States	13 September 1942	An ocean liner that was sunk by German forces 198 miles northwest of Bear Island.	76.00°N 09.30°E
HMS Somali	Royal Navy	20 September 1942	A Tribal-class destroyer that was torpedoed by U-703 and sank under tow north of Iceland.	69°11′N 15°32′W
SS Stalingrad	Soviet Union	13 September 1942	A cargo ship that was torpedoed by U-408 about 100 miles southwest of Spitsbergen, Norway.	75°52′N 7°55′E
U-88	Kriegsmarine	12 September 1942	A Type VIIC U-boat that was sunk by HMS Faulknor south of Svalbard.	75°04′N 04°49′E
U-289	Kriegsmarine	31 May 1944	A Type VIIC U-boat that was sunk by HMS Milne northeast of Jan Mayen Island.	73°32′N 00°28′E
U-408	Kriegsmarine	5 November 1942	A Type VIIC U-boat that was sunk by an American aircraft north of Iceland.	67°40′N 18°32′W

== Southern Ocean ==
Ship	Flag	Sunk date	Notes	Coordinates
MY Ady Gil	New Zealand	7 January 2010	A trimaran, formerly named Earthrace, that broke the global circumnavigation record in 2008. It was later converted into an anti-whaling ship, and was sunk in a collision with MV Shōnan Maru 2, sparking a series of legal disputes.	64°01′50″S 143°05′23″E
MV Explorer	Liberia	23 November 2007	A cruise ship that hit an iceberg in the Bransfield Strait.	62.404882°S 57.196247°W
San Telmo	Spain	2 September 1819	A ship of the line that sank in a storm in Drake Passage.	62°20′S 60°30′W
