= Convoy PQ 18 =

Allied WWII freighter convoy to the Soviet Union

- Part of Arctic Convoys of the Second World War
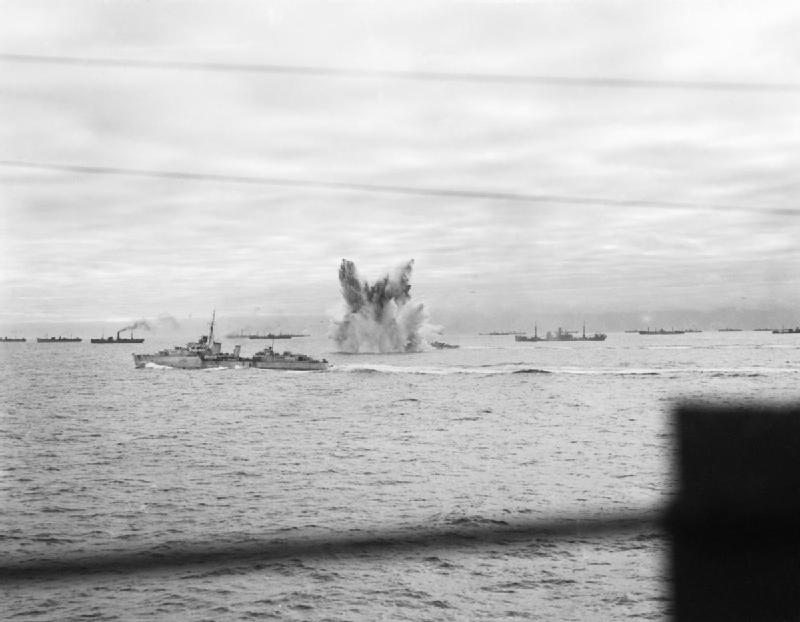
- A depth-charge explosion near Convoy PQ 18
Date	2–21 September 1942
Location	Arctic Ocean
Result	Allied victory

Belligerents
United Kingdom; United States; Soviet Union	Germany

Commanders and leaders
Robert Burnett	Otto Klüber; Rolf Carls

Strength
40 merchant ships; 40–50 escorts in relays; 2 submarines; 1 escort carrier; (12 Sea Hurricane fighters, 3 Swordfish reconnaissance aircraft)	12 U-boats; 92 torpedo-bombers; 120 bombers; long-range reconnaissance aircraft

Casualties and losses
13 merchant ships; 4 Sea Hurricanes; 550+ survivors rescued	4 U-boats; 22–44 aircraft
- A Sea Hurricane was washed overboard from HMS Avenger

Convoy PQ 18 (2–21 September 1942) was an Arctic convoy of forty Allied freighters from Scotland and Iceland to Arkhangelsk in the Soviet Union during the Second World War. The convoy departed Loch Ewe, Scotland on 2 September 1942, rendezvoused with more ships and escorts at Iceland and arrived at Arkhangelsk on 21 September. An exceptionally large number of escorts were provided by the Royal Navy in Operation EV, including the first escort carrier to accompany an Arctic convoy. Detailed information on German intentions was provided by the code breakers at Bletchley Park and elsewhere, through Ultra signals decrypts and eavesdropping on Luftwaffe wireless communications.

The German B-Dienst code-breakers read some British signals and the Luftwaffe used the lull in convoys after Convoy PQ 17 (27 June – 10 July) to prepare a maximum effort with the Kriegsmarine. From 12 to 21 September Convoy PQ 18 was attacked by bombers, torpedo-bombers, U-boats and mines, which sank thirteen ships at a cost of forty-four aircraft and four U-boats. The convoy was defended by escort ships and the aircraft of the escort carrier HMS Avenger which used signals intelligence gleaned from Ultra and Luftwaffe wireless frequencies to provide early warning of some air attacks and to attempt evasive routeing of the convoy around concentrations of U-boats. United States Navy Armed Guard and British Naval and Royal Artillery Maritime Regiment gunners were embarked on the freighters to operate anti-aircraft guns and barrage balloons, which made air attacks more difficult and because of inexperience, occasionally wounded men and damaged ships and cargo, with wild shooting.

The convoy handed over its distant escorts and Avenger to the homeward bound Convoy QP 14 near Archangelsk on 16 September and continued with the close escort and local escorts, riding out a storm in the Northern Dvina estuary and the last attacks by the Luftwaffe, before reaching Archangelsk on 21 September. Several ships ran aground in the storm but all were eventually refloated; unloading the convoy took a month. Because of its losses and the transfer in November of its most effective remaining aircraft to the Mediterranean, to oppose Operation Torch, the Luftwaffe effort could never be repeated.

== Background ==
=== Arctic convoys ===
In October 1941, after Operation Barbarossa, the German invasion of the USSR, which had begun on 22 June, the Prime Minister, Winston Churchill, made a commitment to send a convoy to the Arctic ports of the USSR every ten days and to deliver 1,200 tanks a month from July 1942 to January 1943, followed by 2,000 tanks and another 3,600 aircraft more than already promised. (Note: In October 1941, the unloading capacity of Archangel was 300,000 long tons (300,000 t), Vladivostok 140,000 long tons (140,000 t) and 60,000 long tons (61,000 t) in the Persian Gulf ports.) The first convoy was due at Murmansk around 12 October and the next convoy was to depart Iceland on 22 October. A motley of British, Allied and neutral shipping loaded with military stores and raw materials for the Soviet war effort would be assembled at Hvalfjordur, Iceland, convenient for ships from both sides of the Atlantic. By late 1941, the convoy system used in the Atlantic had been established on the Arctic run; a convoy commodore ensured that the ships' masters and signals officers attended a briefing before sailing, to make arrangements for the management of the convoy, which sailed in a formation of long rows of short columns. The commodore was usually a retired naval officer, aboard a ship identified by a white pendant with a blue cross. The commodore was assisted by a Naval signals party of four men, who used lamps, semaphore flags and telescopes to pass signals, coded from books carried in a bag, weighted to be dumped overboard. In large convoys, the commodore was assisted by vice- and rear-commodores who directed the speed, course and zig-zagging of the merchant ships and liaised with the escort commander. (Note: By the end of 1941, 187 Matilda II and 249 Valentine tanks had been delivered, comprising 25 percent of the medium-heavy tanks in the Red Army, making 30–40 per cent of the medium-heavy tanks defending Moscow. In December 1941, 16 percent of the fighters defending Moscow were Hawker Hurricanes and Curtiss Tomahawks from Britain and by 1 January 1942, 96 Hurricane fighters were flying in the Soviet Air Forces (Voyenno-Vozdushnye Sily, VVS). The British supplied radar apparatus, machine tools, Asdic and commodities.)

Following Convoy PQ 16 and the disaster to Convoy PQ 17 in July 1942, Arctic convoys were postponed for nine weeks and much of the Home Fleet was detached to the Mediterranean for Operation Pedestal, a Malta convoy. During the lull, Admiral John Tovey concluded that the Home Fleet had been of no great protection to convoys beyond Bear Island, midway between Spitsbergen and the North Cape. Tovey would oversee the operation from Scapa Flow, where the fleet was linked to the Admiralty by landline, immune to variations in wireless reception. The next convoy should be accompanied by sufficient protection against surface attack; the longer-range destroyers of the Home Fleet could be used to augment the close escort force of anti-submarine and anti-aircraft ships, to confront a sortie by German ships with the threat of a massed destroyer torpedo attack. The practice of meeting homeward-bound QP convoys near Bear Island was dispensed with and QP 14 was to wait until Convoy PQ 18 was near its destination, despite the longer journey being more demanding of crews, fuel and equipment. The new escort carrier HMS Avenger (Commander Anthony Colthurst) had arrived from the United States and was added to the escort force, to give the convoy air cover.

=== Signals intelligence ===
==== Bletchley Park ====
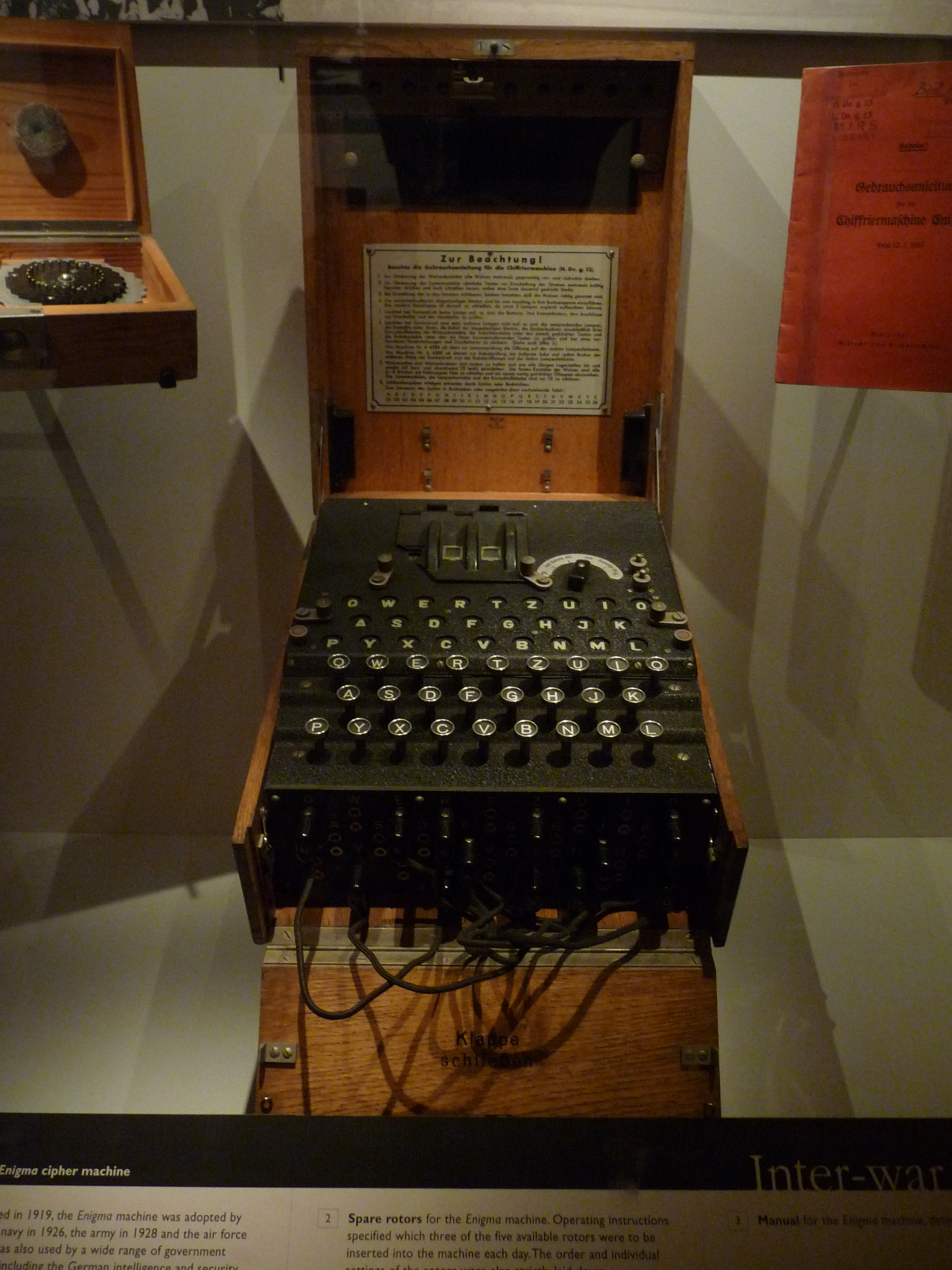
Photograph of a German Enigma coding machine

The British Government Code and Cypher School (GC&CS) based at Bletchley Park housed a small industry of code-breakers and traffic analysts. By June 1941, the German Enigma machine Home Waters (Heimish) settings used by surface ships and U-boats could quickly be read. On 1 February 1942, the Enigma machines used in U-boats in the Atlantic and Mediterranean were changed but German ships and the U-boats in Arctic waters continued with the older Heimish (Hydra from 1942, Dolphin to the British). By mid-1941, British Y-stations were able to receive and read Luftwaffe W/T transmissions and give advance warning of Luftwaffe operations.

In 1941, naval Headache personnel, with receivers to eavesdrop on Luftwaffe wireless transmissions, were embarked on warships and from May 1942, ships gained RAF Y computor parties, which sailed with cruiser admirals in command of convoy escorts, to interpret Luftwaffe W/T signals intercepted by the Headaches. The Admiralty sent details of Luftwaffe wireless frequencies, call signs and the daily local codes to the computors, which combined with their knowledge of Luftwaffe procedures, could glean fairly accurate details of German reconnaissance sorties. Sometimes computors predicted attacks twenty minutes before they were detected by radar.

==== B-Dienst ====
The rival German Beobachtungsdienst (B-Dienst, Observation Service) of the Kriegsmarine Marinenachrichtendienst (MND, Naval Intelligence Service) had broken several Admiralty codes and cyphers by 1939, which were used to help Kriegsmarine ships elude British forces and provide opportunities for surprise attacks. From June to August 1940, six British submarines were sunk in the Skaggerak using information gleaned from British wireless signals. In 1941, B-Dienst read signals from the Commander in Chief Western Approaches informing convoys of areas patrolled by U-boats, enabling the submarines to move into "safe" zones. B-Dienst had broken Naval Cypher No 3 in February 1942 and by March was reading up to 80 per cent of the traffic, which continued until 15 December 1943. By coincidence, the British lost access to the Shark cypher and had no information to send in Cypher No 3 which might compromise Ultra. In early September, Finnish Radio Intelligence deciphered a Soviet Air Force transmission which divulged the convoy itinerary and forwarded it to the Germans.

== Prelude ==
=== Operation Orator ===
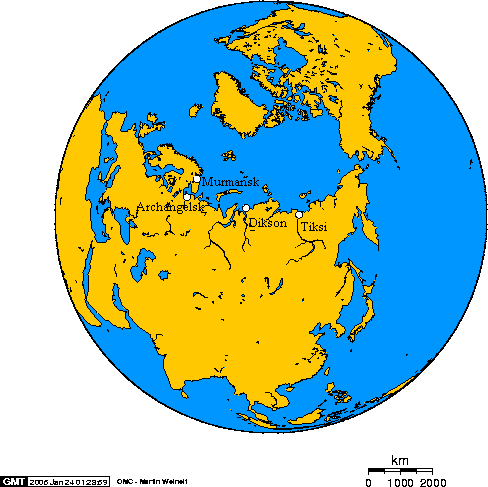
Arctic Ocean, Murmansk and Archangesk

An anti-shipping force (Group Captain Frank Hopps) for the Barents Sea comprising 32 Handley Page Hampden torpedo-bombers from 144 Squadron, Royal Air Force (RAF) and 455 Squadron, Royal Australian Air Force (RAAF) nine Catalina maritime patrol aircraft from 210 Squadron RAF and three photo reconnaissance Spitfires from the RAF Photographic Reconnaissance Unit, was sent to the Soviet Union to oppose an attack by a group of German surface ships assembled in Norwegian waters, which included the battleship Tirpitz. On 13 August the cruiser USS Tuscaloosa, two US and one British destroyer sailed for Russia, with RAF ground crews for the Hampden squadrons and a medical unit. (Note: Destroyers USS Rodman, USS Emmons and HMS Onslaught. The ships began the return journey on 24 August, with survivors from PQ 17.) The Catalinas were to be based at Grasnaya on the Kola Inlet and the Hampdens and Spitfires at Vaenga.

The Catalinas had to remain on operations until the last minute, which meant that their equipment and ground crews also had to travel by air. The relatively short range of the Hampdens and the limited navigational equipment on board and the weather caused the loss of several Hampdens and others were shot down en route. Six bombers crashed in Sweden or German-occupied Norway and plans for Convoy PQ 18 and Convoy QP 14 were recovered by the Germans from one of the aircraft. Two Hampdens ran out of fuel and force-landed in Russia, one a write-off; one aircraft arrived over the Kola Inlet during an air raid and was shot down into the sea by Russian fighters. The aircraft sank with the wounded air gunner on board and the rest of the crew were strafed in the sea. The survivors managed to get ashore, where they came under small-arms fire, until their cries of "Angliski" were recognised. By 5 September, 24 Hampdens had reached Vaenga.

=== Operation EV ===
Map of Iceland showing Akureyri on the north coast.

Operation EV was the code-name for a naval operation to escort Convoy PQ 18 to a rendezvous with the returning Convoy QP 14 and hand over Convoy PQ 18 to British and Soviet escorts from Archangelsk. The convoy consisted of forty merchant ships including the Catapult Armed Merchant ship (CAM Ship) Empire Morn carrying a Hurricane Mk I fighter and the convoy rescue ship SS Copeland. The Convoy Commodore, Rear-Admiral (retd.) Edye Boddam-Whetham RNR, was in Temple Arch. Three minesweepers to be based in Russia accompanied the convoy along with Force Q, two Royal Fleet Auxiliary (RFA) oilers RFA Gray Ranger and RFA Black Ranger. A Close Escort (Commander A. B. Russell) was led by the destroyer HMS Malcolm, with two destroyers and two anti-aircraft ships, four Flower-class corvettes, four anti-submarine trawlers, three minesweepers and two submarines. (Note: Destroyers HMS Achates and Amazon, anti-aircraft ships Ulster Queen and Alynbank, corvettes Bergamot, Bluebell, Bryony and Camellia, minesweepers Gleaner, Harrier and Sharpshooter and the submarines P614 and P615.)

The Carrier Force comprised Avenger with 802 Naval Air Squadron and 882 Naval Air Squadron Fleet Air Arm (six Sea Hurricane fighters each) and 825 Naval Air Squadron (three Swordfish reconnaissance and torpedo-bombers, shared by five crews) and three destroyers. (Note: HMS Wheatland and Wilton.) A Fighting Destroyer Escort (FDE) of the cruiser HMS Scylla (Rear Admiral Robert Burnett) and sixteen fleet destroyers were disposed in Force A [Captain (D) H. T. Armstrong] in HMS Onslow and Force B [Captain (D) I. M. R. Campbell] in HMS Milne. (Note: Force A, Onslaught, HMS Opportune, Offa, Ashanti, Eskimo, Somali, Tartar; Force B Marne, Martin, Meteor, Faulknor, Fury, Impulsive and Intrepid. Burnett ("Bullshit Bob") had tried to explain the reason for the scattering of PQ 17 when the destroyers were back in Scapa Flow but his address fell flat; before Convoy PQ 18, the FDE was visited by Churchill to try to restore morale.) The Spitzbergen Fuelling Force (Force P) departing ahead of the convoy on 3 September was made up of two RFA oilers and four destroyers, bound for Lowe Sound. Spitzbergen was the Dutch name of the islands (Jagged Mountains) until 1925, when they became Svalbard (Norwegian) in the Svalbard Treaty. (Note: RFA Blue Ranger and Oligarch, HMS Cowdray, Oakley, Windsor and Worcester) The summer melt of the polar ice cap meant that the convoy could sail north of Bear Island, considerably lengthening the journey and to conserve fuel, destroyer attacks on U-boats were limited to 90 minutes' duration.

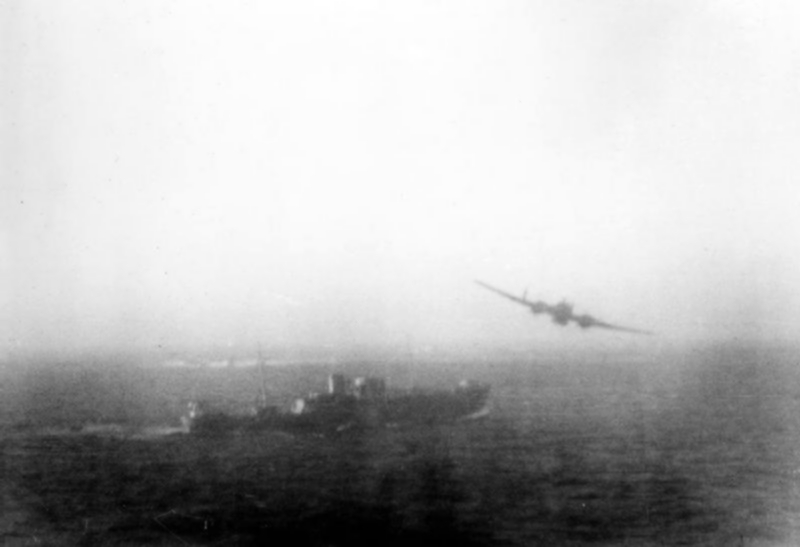
A Handley Page Hampden TB Mark I sweeps over an armed German supply ship off Egero, Norway (29 January 1943).

Vice-Admiral Stuart Bonham Carter commanded a Cruiser Covering Force (CCF) comprising three cruisers and a concurrent supply run was to be made to Svalbard by two cruisers and a destroyer. (Note: CCF HMS Norfolk, Suffolk and London, Svalbard group: Cumberland, Sheffield.) A Distant Covering Force (Vice Admiral Bruce Fraser) with the battleships HMS Anson and Duke of York, the cruiser Jamaica and five short-range destroyers, was to sail from Akureyri on the north Icelandic coast. Four submarines took station off the Lofoten Islands and three off north Norway. The convoy was to be escorted by Western Approaches Command from its departure Loch Ewe in Scotland on 2 September to the Denmark Strait by seven destroyers and five trawlers until a handover on 7 September. Four Soviet destroyers with four British corvettes and three minesweepers were to rendezvous with the convoy near Archangelsk.

=== Marinegruppenkommando Nord ===
On 24 June, a British minesweeper based at Kola was sunk by Ju 87 Stuka dive-bombers and on 16 August, Admiral Scheer conducted Unternehmen Wunderland, a sortie against Russian ships thought to be sailing along the route north of Siberia. Admiral Scheer sailed north of Novaya Zemlya and then to the east and sank a Soviet icebreaker. By 30 August Admiral Scheer was back in Narvik. B-Dienst signals interception and documents recovered from a crashed Hampden, revealed details about Convoy PQ 18 and Convoy QP 14, including their crossover and escort changeover points. U-boats, destroyers and the minelayer Ulm sailed on Operation Zar (Unternehmen Zar) to sow mines at the entrance of the White Sea and off Novaya Zemlya. Hubert Schmundt was the Admiral Nordmeer until September when Admiral Otto Klüber, his chief of staff, took over.

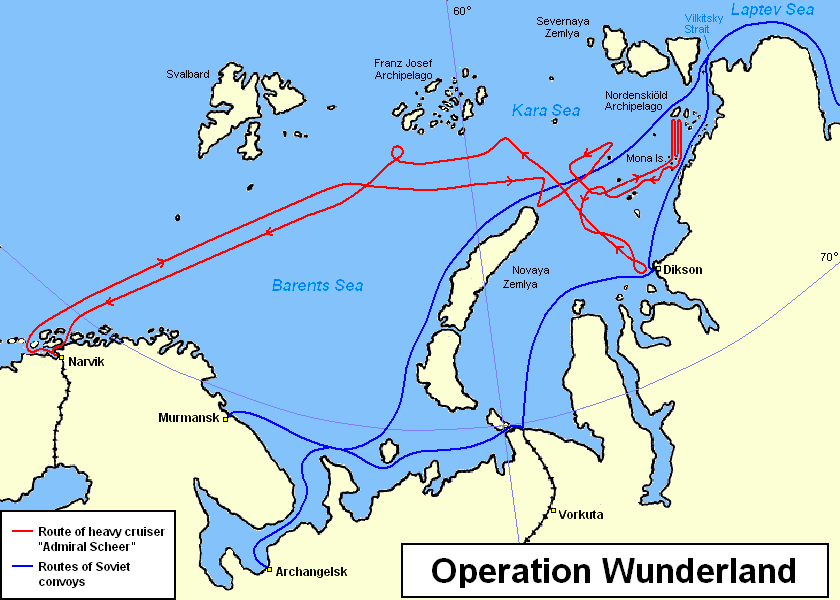
Unternehmen Wunderland

On 25 August, Ultra revealed the itinerary of Ulm and the destroyers (Onslaught, Marne and Martin) with Tuscaloosa, sailing south of Bear Island, were diverted and sank Ulm that night; sixty survivors were taken prisoner. The Germans had to press Admiral Hipper into service as a minelayer. The Kriegsmarine established a U-boat patrol group of twelve boats in the Norwegian Sea and a squadron comprising the cruisers Admiral Scheer, Admiral Hipper, German cruiser Köln and four destroyers to attack Convoy PQ 18. Since Unternehmen Rösselsprung in the summer, the battleship Tirpitz and cruiser Lützow and three destroyers were in dock for repairs and were not available for operations.

=== Luftwaffe ===
The Luftwaffe reconnaissance aircraft scoured the Norwegian Sea early in August, looking for the next convoy, using 1,000,000 L (220,000 imp gal; 260,000 US gal) of scarce aviation fuel to accumulate 1,603 flying hours before it was assumed that the convoy had been delayed and the effort was reduced. During the lull after Convoy PQ 17 the Luftwaffe assemble a force of 35 Junkers Ju 88 A-4 dive-bombers of Kampfgeschwader 30 (KG 30) at Banak and 42 torpedo-bombers of Kampfgeschwader 26 (KG 26) (I/KG 26 [Major Werner Klümper] with 28 Heinkel He 111 H-6s and III/KG 26 with 14 Ju 88A-4s) at Bardufoss (Fliegerführer Lofoten Colonel August Roth) and Banak, with I StG 5 (Ju 87) at Kirkenes (Fliegerführer Nordost, Colonel Alexander Holle). The reconnaissance aircraft of Luftflotte 5 (Generaloberst Hans-Jürgen Stumpff) comprised I/Seefernaufklärungsgruppe 406 (He 115) at Tromsø, I/Seefernaufklärungsgruppe 906 (BV 138) at Stavanger, I KG 40 (Fw 200) at Trondheim, I (F)/22 and I (F)/124 (Ju 88) divided between Bardufoss, Banak and Kirkenes and Wettererkundungstaffel 6 (Weste 6) at Banak.

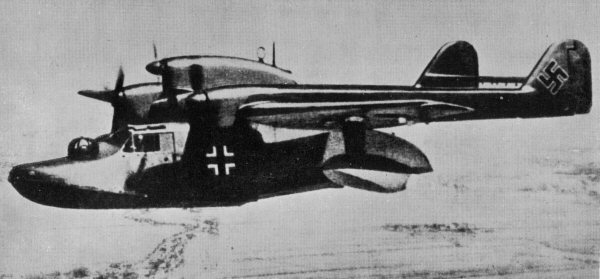
Blohm und Voss BV 138 reconnaissance flying boat

The Luftwaffe believed that the scattering of Convoy PQ 17 was caused by its attacks and looked forward to another success. The crews of Luftflotte 5 made exaggerated claims of ships sunk, including a cruiser and the anti-shipping units devised a new tactic called Goldene Zange (Golden Comb). Ju 88 bombers were to divert the defenders with medium and dive bombing attacks as the torpedo-bombers approached out of the twilight, flying in line abreast from the bow quarter at wave-top height to evade radar, the convoy being silhouetted against the lighter sky, then dropping their torpedoes in a salvo. When B-Dienst discovered that an aircraft carrier would accompany the next convoy, Reichsmarschall Hermann Göring gave orders for a maximum effort against it; aircrew were told that the destruction of the convoy was the best way to help the German army at Stalingrad and Caucasus in southern Russia.

== Convoy PQ 18 ==
=== 2–11 September ===
Voyage of Convoy PQ 18

Convoy PQ 18 left Loch Ewe on 2 September 1942, accompanied by its Local Escort force from Western Approaches Command. The convoy ran into stormy weather, which made formation keeping much harder, particularly for some of the ships with novice crews, dubious about the British since the PQ 17 disaster. Some escorts also had inexperienced crews and Scylla and Avenger were new ships. Avenger had engine trouble, a Sea Hurricane was washed overboard and aircraft tethered below, broke free and slid around the hangar, as did fuzed bombs. The convoy was reported by U-456 and on 6 September, a Focke-Wulf Fw 200 Condor long-range reconnaissance aircraft had observed Avenger and the Close Escort Force at Seidisfiord in Iceland. The Condor identified Avenger as Argus and near-missed with its bombs. Next day, as the convoy sailed round the south-west of Iceland, the local escort docked at Hvalfiordur and the close escort with six Soviet freighters joined the convoy, which rounded the west coast heading north. The convoy was sighted by a Condor on 8 September and then hidden by an overcast.

A Swedish source (A2) in Stockholm had told the British naval attaché that a surface ship operation would be mounted against the next convoy and by 8 September, the Admiralty could provide the escort commander a report on the positions of the twenty U-boats expected to attack the convoy and forecast that 65 torpedo-bombers (true figure 92) and 120 bombers were preparing the biggest torpedo attack on an Arctic convoy so far. On 8 September the convoy was joined by Scylla, with the FDE and the Avenger carrier group, which had waited until 8:30 p.m. before sailing, to conserve fuel and took post around the convoy at the same time on 9 September; the Germans sent new search positions to the U-boats and this was passed to the convoy the next day. The Cruiser Covering Force had sailed independently to a position west of Bear Island and the group carrying supplies bound for the Norwegian weather station at Barentsburg was off Svalbard, using Convoy PQ 18 to divert the Luftwaffe. The battleships of the distant covering force had sailed from Seidisfiord towards Jan Mayen Island.

Contact was made by U-boats from Wolfpack gruppe Eispalast of twelve boats, which were distributed in three groups along the expected route of the convoy. On 10 September, the weather worsened and fog descended as the escorts chased Asdic reports of submarines. Off Norway, far to the east, as Scheer, Hipper, Koln and their destroyers began Unternehmen Doppelschlag. Next day, as the convoy made its way through fog and rain squalls which turned to snow, Boddam-Whetham criticised the ships' station keeping and warned that they should keep two cables apart [about 200 yd (180 m)]. Scylla and five destroyers of the 3rd Destroyer Flotilla from the FDE departed the convoy for Bellsundet (Bell Sound) on the south-west coast on the Svalbard and arrived at 11:40 a.m. on 12 September, to fuel from the two oilers in Axelfjord; the destroyers departed at 4:00 a.m. on 13 September. (Note: The M class destroyers were the best armed of the escorts, their QF 4.7 inch Mark XI guns being capable of elevating to 50° and carried four or eight torpedo tubes in one or two quad mounts.)

=== 12 September ===
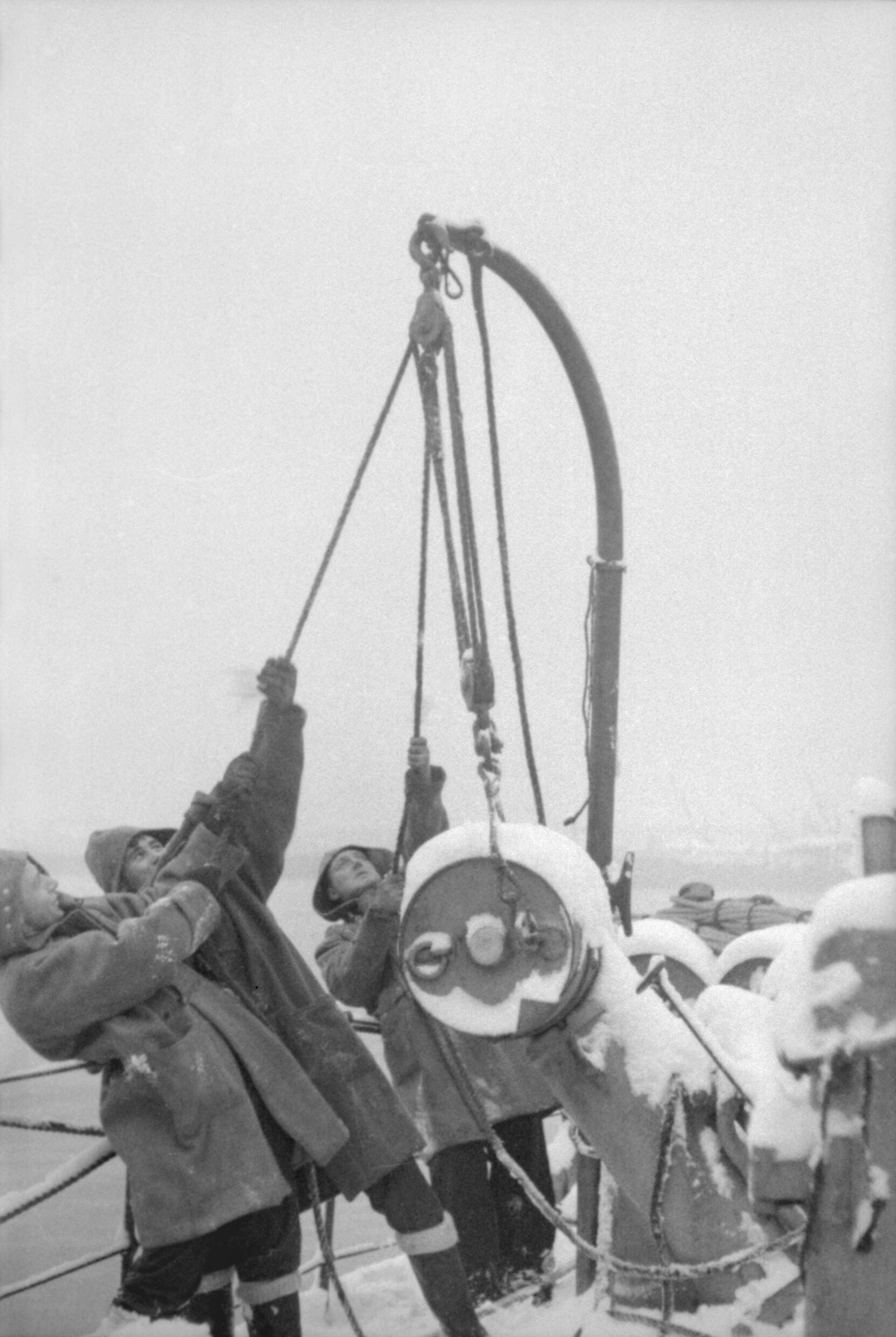
Royal Marines hoisting a depth charge onto its thrower in the snow at Rosyth (A7136)

Dawn on 12 September was overcast clear underneath, with a north-westerly breeze when a BV 138 dropped below the cloud. Four Sea Hurricanes took off from Avenger but failed to shoot down the shadower, which flew back into the clouds. Sea Hurricanes were armed with rifle calibre machine-guns and hits often failed to penetrate. During the day, escorts' High-frequency direction finding equipment (Huff-Duff) detected U-boat wireless transmissions and the escorts made many depth charge attacks, driving off several U-boats. In front of the convoy at 9:00 p.m., the destroyer Faulknor, received an Asdic echo and destroyed U-88 with its first depth charge salvo.

=== 13 September ===
The convoy received Ultra information on the latest U-boat positions from the Admiralty and Swordfish aircraft were on anti-submarine patrol by 4:00 a.m., dodging a BV 138 and a Ju 88, which were faster and better armed. The German aircraft disappeared into cloud when Sea Hurricanes took off from Avenger, then flew back as soon as they landed. Several U-boats were forced to dive by the Swordfish but at 9:00 a.m. the Russian freighter SS Stalingrad in the tenth column, on the right flank, was torpedoed and sunk at 75° 52' N, 07° 55' E by U-408 and U-589 with 21 dead from the crew of 87. Oliver Ellsworth, following behind, turned to avoid the ship and was hit by another torpedo as the rest of Convoy PQ 18 was making the emergency turn and one man was lost. Several minesweepers and trawlers converged on the site and rescued the survivors. Sea Hurricanes were sent to attack several BV 138s reported to be dropping mines ahead of the convoy but again failed to destroy them; Swordfish tried to attack U-boats on the surface only to be foiled by the BV 138s. Early in the afternoon, two escorts attacked with no result after a conning tower was seen and another U-boat was chased out of the convoy.

At 2:30 a.m., when Convoy PQ 18 was about 150 nmi (280 km; 170 mi) north-west of Bear Island and about to turn into the Barents Sea, the 3rd Destroyer Flotilla returned from refuelling at Svalbard. Twenty Ju 88s of KG 30 appeared and bombed through gaps in the cloud; Sea Hurricanes were sent to intercept but failed to shoot down any of the bombers. At about 3:40 p.m., when the Sea Hurricanes were back on deck and rearming, ships' radars detected several formations of aircraft at 60 nmi (110 km; 69 mi) range. There was an overcast, the cloud base was at 3,000 ft (910 m) a moderate sea was running and intermittent showers and sleet obscured the convoy. The bombing succeeded in disrupting the convoy formation as 28 He 111s of I/KG 26 in two waves, followed by 18 Ju 88s of III/KG 26 and seventeen from KG 30 prepared to make a Goldene Zange attack. One of the Ju 88s shadowing the convoy flew to rendezvous with the torpedo-bombers and guide them to their target.

They rose up on the horizon, black and repulsive, and they extended far on either side of our view. They came in low on the starboard bow of the convoy and seemed to fill the whole horizon.

— Sub-Lieutenant Hughes.

They swept in, thirty or forty of them, about twenty feet above sea level, disregarding completely the escort screen. It was the merchant ships they were after, and the merchant ships they meant to get.

Standing orders to keep station meant that the anti-aircraft ship HMS Ulster Queen, on the left side of the convoy, remained out of range. The escorts closed in, rather than keeping their distance to disrupt the Luftwaffe formations as they passed overhead; the Sea Hurricanes were still on deck. Boddam-Whetham ordered a 45° emergency turn away from a torpedo attack by sounding a horn and the raising a signal flag, to be repeated by the other ships as they were seen but the ninth and tenth columns (right flank column and the next one to port) maintained course. The torpedo-bombers approached so close to the sea that machine-guns and even the low-angle BL 4.7-inch guns Mk I on some of the destroyers could be brought to bear,

...a pall of smoke hung like a curtain out on the starboard flank...criss-crossed by the bright red tracers and punctuated by the flashes of the shell bursts. The place was an absolute inferno.

Some of the anti-aircraft fire was poorly aimed and spent rounds from the ships on the left flank hit those on the right, wounding gunners, damaging cargoes and holing lifeboats. The torpedo-bomber formation split to pass the cruiser Scylla then each bomber dropped two torpedoes and turned towards the stern of the convoy. Some pilots pressed their attacks

...with suicidal daring, [and] flew in amongst the ships, dropping their torpedoes at very close range.

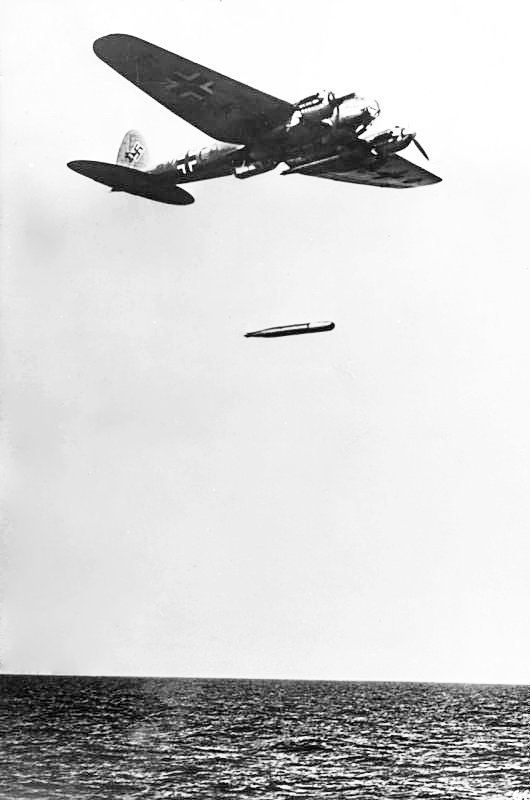
Photograph of a Heinkel 111 just after dropping one of its torpedoes. (Bundesarchiv Bild 183-L20414)

Empire Stevenson, at the head of the ninth column disappeared in a plume of smoke and was lost with all hands. A torpedo fell straight into a hold of Wacosta, the next ship in the column, exploded and sank the ship, the crew being rescued. Oregonian at the head of the tenth column was hit by three torpedoes, capsized and only 27 of the 55 crew survived, many being badly affected through exposure and swallowing oil. Macbeth, following behind, was hit by two torpedoes and the destroyer HMS Offa came alongside to take off the crew before the ship sank. Sukhona and Afrikander were also sunk and the crews rescued by the close escort, leaving Mary Luckenbach as the only survivor of the two columns. At the head of one of the left flank columns, Empire Beaumont was hit, set on fire and the crew rescued; John Penn was torpedoed in the engine room, three men were killed and the ship was sunk by gunfire from the escorts. Some observers reported periscopes inside the convoy and several ships were near-missed by bombs from the Ju 88s above. In fewer than fifteen minutes, eight ships had been sunk for a British claim of five bombers shot down and three probables.

Every bomber had been hit by anti-aircraft fire and four of the I/KG 26 aircraft made emergency landings in the sea; one crew being rescued by Seenotdienst (sea rescue service); two of the surviving aircraft were write-offs and several III/KG 26 aircraft in the second wave were shot down. After the Goldene Zange attack, several Heinkel He 115 (He 115) torpedo floatplanes, waiting out of range, attacked in two formations but were driven off. One of the floatplanes was attacked by four Sea Hurricanes but escaped after shooting down one of the pursuers. More aircraft were seen mining the water ahead of the convoy, which made a sharp turn to port until 8:15 p.m. Fifteen minutes later, as night fell, twelve He 115s attacked from the south-west but were deterred by the anti-aircraft barrage. Two Heinkels were shot down, one crew being captured and the other being rescued by U-405 in the wake of the convoy. (Some late evening losses on 13 September were recorded on the next day.) Colthurst decided that the Sea Hurricanes henceforth would fly standing patrols of 25 minutes duration each, to ensure that some were always available to break up Goldene Zange formations, even if they were too slow and ill-armed to inflict many losses. The captain of Ulster Queen resolved to ignore the standing orders to keep station and steer towards incoming aircraft instead.

==== Unternehmen Doppelschlag ====
The German surface force at Narvik had been alerted when the convoy was first sighted and on 10 September sailed north to Altafjord to begin Unternehmen Doppelschlag (Operation Double Hit). The move was sighted by the two British submarines on patrol and HMS Tigris made an abortive torpedo attack on Admiral Scheer, erroneously reporting the ship as Tirpitz. Soon after midnight on 10/11 September the Admiralty reported Enigma messages that Admiral Hipper was due at Altefjord at 3:00 a.m. and in the afternoon that Tirpitz was still at Narvik. On 13 September, Enigma showed that the ships at Altefjord had come to one hours' notice at 4:50 p.m. which was relayed to the convoy escort commander at 11;25 p.m. The ships were photographed at Altefjord by PRU Spitfires on 14, 15 and 16 September. Enigma showed that Tirpitz was still in Narvik on 14 September and on 16 September, the Swedish source A2 reported that only Admiral Hipper, Admiral Scheer and Köln would operate against Convoy PQ 18. Doppelschlag had already been called off on 13 September; while the ships were at Altefjord. Hitler, reluctant to risk the loss of any of his capital ships on an offensive operation, had refused to authorise a sortie. The Hampden force in Russia had undertaken an anti-shipping patrol on 14 September but found no targets. (The RAF donated the remaining Hampdens and Spitfires to the Soviet Air Force (Voyenno-Vozdushnye Sily, VVS) and the crews returned to Britain on the cruiser HMS Argonaut and two destroyers on 28 October).

=== 14 September ===
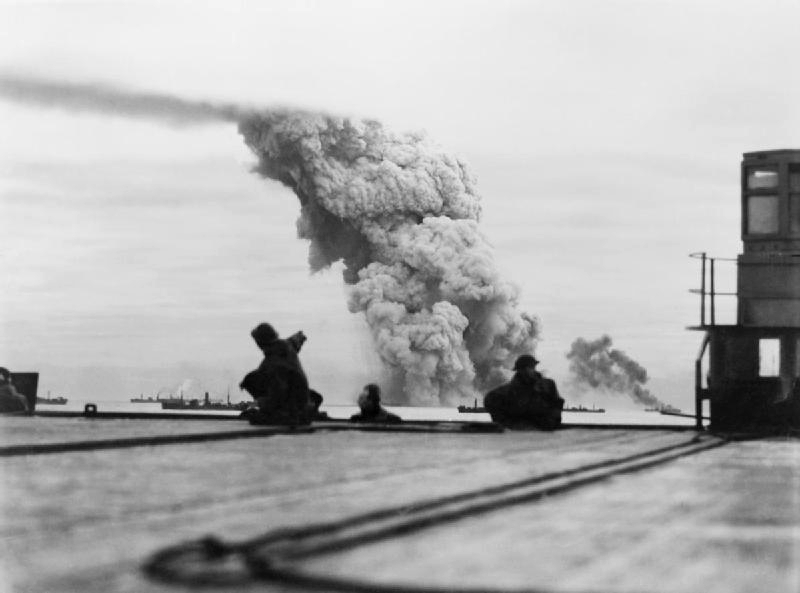
Ammunition ship SS Mary Luckenbach explodes while carrying 1,000 long tons (1,000 t) of TNT, seen from the deck of the escort carrier HMS Avenger

At 3:30 a.m. on 14 September, the oiler Atheltemplar was torpedoed by U-457 which was being stalked by an escort, the U-boat then dived under the convoy and escaped, cloaked from Asdic by propeller noise. Fires on Atheltemplar were impossible to extinguish and it was abandoned, to be sunk by the escorts after the survivors were rescued. Swordfish patrols began at dawn and at 9:40 a.m. a U-boat about 6 nmi (11 km; 6.9 mi) starboard of the convoy was spotted and marked by a smoke float before a Ju 88 shadowing aircraft saw off the Swordfish. U-589 surfaced again and was seen by an escort heading for the smoke around 10:50 a.m. U-589 dived again, was depth charged several times and destroyed on the eighth attack at 1:07 p.m. When the escort made for the convoy, its captain left a shot-down German bomber crew behind. The Swordfish played cat and mouse with Ju 88s and BV 138s, trying to lure them into range of ships' guns and at 12:37 p.m., a German torpedo-bomber formation of III/KG 26 was reported by a Swordfish to be en route for the convoy at wave top height. The torpedo-bomber formation divided to nullify attempts by the ships to evade their attacks.

Avenger had a standing patrol of Sea Hurricanes aloft and increased speed to emerge from the head of the convoy and run down the port side. Ulster Queen also left station to meet the attack along with Scylla and Achates. During these manoeuvres, Boddam-Whetham ordered another 45° emergency turn away. The torpedo-bomber formation divided and one part turned towards Avenger; the barrage made the others release their torpedoes too soon, some of which turned over in the air. No hits were achieved and by 12:45 p.m. eleven Ju 88s had been shot down. KG 30 arrived and dive-bombed from 2,000 ft (610 m) until 2:10 p.m. through breaks in the cloud, opposed by the anti-aircraft fire of the convoy and attacks by six Sea Hurricanes. One Ju 88 was shot down as Avenger and several other ships were near-missed. At 2:05 p.m. twenty-two He 111s of I/KG 26 and eighteen Ju 88 torpedo-bombers attacked head on, having received reports that Avenger was in front the convoy. The bombers found Scylla instead and were attacked from behind by Sea Hurricanes, which dived on the formation as it flew into the anti-aircraft barrage. Several torpedo-bomber pilots saw Avenger and altered course down the starboard side of the convoy to attack. Three of the Sea Hurricanes which followed the German aircraft into the barrage were shot down by the ships, the pilots being rescued by destroyers. Two He 111s aimed at Avenger which combed the tracks (steered between them) several bombers did not drop and others did at random.

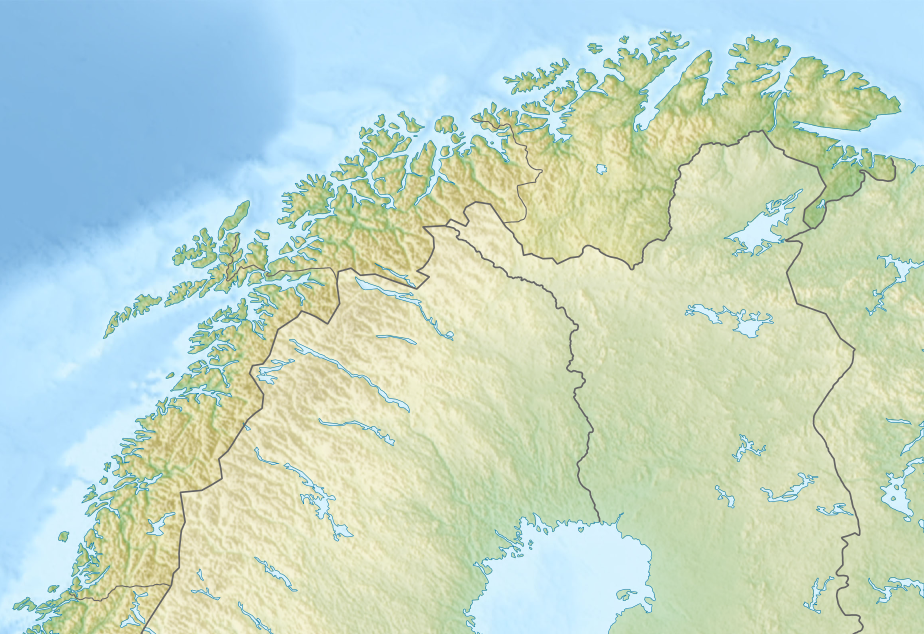
Northern Norway marked with Kriegsmarine and Luftwaffe bases

Mary Luckenbach was torpedoed from 300 yd (270 m) by a bomber which strafed the superstructure as it passed overhead, its starboard engine on fire as it crashed into the sea; Mary Luckenbach, the last ship of the ninth and tenth columns, disappeared in a huge explosion. Ships nearby were showered with débris and concussion led the captain of Nathaniel Greene to order abandon ship, under the impression that it had been torpedoed, until he realised his mistake; two injured gunners were taken off by a destroyer. Five He 111s crashed near the convoy, four more force-landed in the sea and five of the thirteen survivors were seriously damaged. The British claimed 13 torpedo-bombers for a loss of the three Sea Hurricanes. Luftwaffe records show at least 23 aircraft of I./KG 26, III./KG 26, III./KG 30, I./406 and I./906 were destroyed; I/KG 26 was reduced to eight serviceable aircraft.

The crew of one of the shot down bombers was fired on as columns of the convoy passed by. Ju 88 bombers from KG 30 conducted level- and dive-bombing attacks on the escorts until 3:30 p.m., then climbed into the cloud and departed. The Sea Hurricane pilots claimed five bombers and the speed with which the escorts had rescued the three shot down Hurricane pilots raised their morale. Avenger had achieved a much better radar-controlled fighter interception than the day before. During the evening, Convoy PQ 18 passed Hope Island and some of the 550 survivors were redistributed, 209 being accommodated on Scylla and 234 on the fleet destroyers due to return with Convoy QP 14. One destroyer bound for Iceland took off the unwounded survivors on Copeland, leaving 96 seriously wounded men being treated.

=== 15 September ===
Dawn on 15 September broke with a calm sea and patchy cloud at 3,000 ft (910 m); during the day the wind rose, bringing showers of rain, sleet and snow. Overnight and in the morning, Huff-Duff detected wireless transmissions from U-boats in the vicinity; Swordfish anti-submarine patrols were flown by Avenger from first light. German reconnaissance aircraft reached the convoy around 8:00 a.m. and near noon, German bombers were detected and Sea Hurricanes scrambled. The raid lasted for about three hours, the bombers attacking through gaps in the cloud cover but fighter attacks and the anti-aircraft fire from the ships prevented accurate bombing. The computer on Scylla, eavesdropping on 5610kHz, the Luftwaffe frequency, heard the dismay of the bomber pilots at the size of the convoy. The Sea Hurricanes managed eventually to keep the bombers circling out of range; Ulster Queen even managed to shoot down a Ju 88 in cloud, aiming with its gun-laying radar. The last bombers departed at 4:46 p.m. but although the weather worsened, U-boat alerts continued all day. Soon after noon, smoke was seen on the horizon, thought to be from surface ships but when an escort steered south-east to check, it turned out to be diesel smoke from two surfaced U-boats. The U-boats crash-dived and a BV 138 nearby was driven off; the ship failed to located the U-boats with Asdic and one of the U-boats made an abortive attack on the ship, which returned to the convoy at 3:45 p.m. The weather deterioration continued into the evening and as the destroyer Meteor returned to its station after dropping back to refuel, a depth-charge attack was made on a "suspicious object".

=== 16 September ===
U-boat contacts were made all night and at 3:00 a.m. on 16 September, U-457 sailed beneath the outer anti-submarine screen and prepared to fire a torpedo salvo at the convoy. Impulsive gained an Asdic contact, made a depth-charge attack and then lost contact amidst the propeller noises of the convoy. The destroyer passed between the merchant ships as they steamed over the position of the attack, found the suggestive smell of oil and bubbles on the sea, claiming a probable; U-457 had been destroyed. Soon after dawn, the first Catalina from Russia arrived, allowing the Swordfish crews to cease their anti-submarine patrols and at 9:00 a.m. the convoy turned south, running into mist and rising winds. At 10:40 a.m., two escorts attacked a U-boat but it evaded the attack with a Pillenwerfer, a discharge of compressed air which gave the same Asdic echo as a submarine and the hunt was terminated at 1:00 p.m. Wireless contact was made with the homeward QP 14, ready for the changeover and then Scylla and the FDE departed, along with the Avenger group, Alynbank and the two submarine escorts. Convoy PQ 18 and the close escort of corvettes, minesweepers and trawlers as a south-easterly gale brought mist and rain. There were constant U-boat alarms and at one point, mines were seen amidst the freighters, leading to the convoy gunners engaging anything seen afloat, to the detriment of seals in the sea, men, superstructure and cargo on other ships.

=== 17–18 September ===
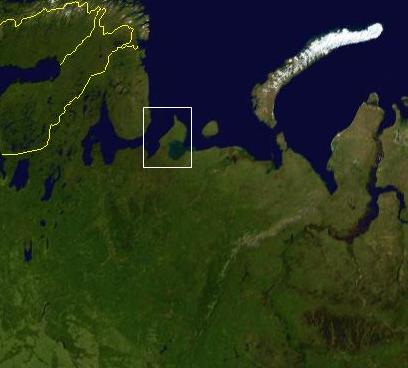
NASA satellite photograph of the Kanin Peninsula

The Soviet destroyers Gremyashchy and Sokrushitelny arrived before noon on 17 September and made a substantial addition to the anti-aircraft firepower of the close escort; Kuibishev and Uritski arriving next morning. At 6:00 a.m. on 18 September, the convoy reached Cape Kanin as the Luftwaffe made another Goldene Zange attack. The last twelve operational He 111 torpedo-bombers of KG 26 attacked at wave-top height from astern as the Ju 88s of KG 30 bombed the convoy. Ulster Queen turned meet the attack broadside; with the first two Russian destroyers, Ulster Queen fired into the sea to create a splash barrage. A witness on Copeland reported that the bombers

Swept in, skimming the water, divided just astern of us and roared past on either side, dropping their fish as they went by. We could see them [torpedoes] leaping clean out of the water like Tarpon before settling down on their course.

Kentucky was hit amidships and caught fire. The crew abandoned ship to be rescued, despite the sea state, by nearby escorts. A request was sent by wireless to Archangelsk for tugs to be sent as two escorts waited with Kentucky. As a party tried to board, a Ju 88 hit Kentucky with two bombs and caused more fires, attracting other bombers to the scene. The escorts tried to finish off the ship with gunfire and then returned to the convoy amidst the Goldene Zange. No Soviet aircraft were available and at 11:50 a.m. Empire Morn launched Flying Officer Burr in his CAM Hurricane, the last air defence of the convoy. Many convoy gunners fired at the Hurricane until it was out of range and Burr also had to weave through the barrage balloons flown by the merchantmen. Burr attacked Heinkels astern of the convoy and obtained a flamer before running out of ammunition. The torpedo-bombers failed to hit any ships for a loss of three bombers and one seriously damaged. (Note: Burr declined to ditch and with a course to Archangelsk, landed at Keg Ostrov at 2:45 p.m. having almost exhausted his fuel.)

The ships had been shaken by many near misses by the torpedo-bombers and after the event it was speculated that many of the torpedoes had dud fuzes. In the confusion, the master of Empire Tristram had thrown overboard the confidential books and begun an abandon ship, before realising his mistake and pressing on. Wild shooting by the convoy gunners wounded one man and hit several aircraft carried on the deck of Patrick Henry. No more torpedo attacks were made on the convoy and soon after, Soviet aircraft appeared and kept away the Ju 88 bombers of KG 30 as the weather deteriorated again. At 4:20 p.m. four British local escorts joined the convoy, which split into two columns as dark fell and the tide in the Dvina Estuary ebbed strongly. Ships crossing the Dvina bar needed navigation beacons but these were not illuminated and some pilot boats failed to appear. Convoy PQ 18 had to drop anchor and spend the night riding out a north-westerly gale against a Lee shore. Some ships dragged their anchors or lost them, others started engines and managed to move away from the shore and heave to and two trawlers used their last coal to steam into wind. One ship had to be steered by hand after the steering gear broke down, Exford lost both anchors and several ships made for the estuary.

=== 20–27 September ===
Map of the Northern Dvina river (Archangelsk top left)

By dawn on 20 September, five ships were aground and an attempt by two corvettes to tow off a trawler failed. Campfire, aground, was full of explosives; the captain ordered the crew to abandon and make for Modyugski Island, which was achieved despite the storm and on 21 September, in better weather, the master and several volunteers re-boarded. For the rest of 20 September, the ships waited for the storm to abate and as the winds fell in the afternoon, twelve Ju 88 bombers appeared through the cloud at 3:40 p.m. and attacked, achieving only several near-misses. On 21 September, pilot boats came out and the ships were guided into port. Three warships stayed behind to guard the grounded ships, which were attacked at 3:45 p.m. by two Ju 88s which had more near misses. As the ships moved upstream, Archangelsk was bombed but the raid hit the town, rather than the port. For several days, cargo on the ships stranded on the sandbar was transferred to two heavy lift ships by lighters and a salvage ship, all the ships being re-floated by 27 September; the last ship was re-floated later; discharging the ships took a month. At a reception to celebrate the arrival of Convoy PQ 18, the convoy Commodore Boddam-Whetham, was cheered to the rafters.

== Aftermath ==
=== Analysis ===
In the official history (1956 [1962]) Stephen Roskill called Convoy PQ 18 an Allied success. The convoy operation brought 28 ships safely to their destinations and the Arctic convoy route, which had been suspended since the loss of Convoy PQ 17, was open again. In 2001, Werner Rahn wrote that the Seekriegsleitung (SKL, Naval War Staff) had called the results "dearly bought and unsatisfactory". In 2004, Richard Woodman referred to Convoy PQ 18 as a Pyrrhic victory. The Luftwaffe torpedo-bomber attacks, while costly, had been highly effective and would have inflicted more losses had not the British Headache operators not given early warning of some attacks, which enabled Sea Hurricanes to be scrambled in time. The Germans failed to prevent the convoy reaching Russia and their losses, particularly in trained pilots, were severe, reducing the ability of the Luftwaffe to repeat its anti-convoy operation. Attacks on Avenger had been defeated and the depth of the escort screen made torpedo attacks on the centre of the convoy extravagantly risky. Coastal Command operations in support of Convoy PQ 18 and the returning convoy QP 14, involved 111 aircraft from 14 squadrons, which flew 279 sorties and logged 2,290 flying hours, most being taken up by the fights to and from the convoy. In November, Luftflotte 5, the German air command in Norway and Finland, was ordered to transfer its Ju 88 and He 111 torpedo-bombers to the Mediterranean against Operation Torch, a decision which the British received through Ultra intercepts. Only the Heinkel 115 floatplanes, suitable for torpedo attacks on stragglers and some Ju 87 dive-bombers remained in Norway, along with a few long-range reconnaissance aircraft to observe for the surface and U-boat forces.

=== Casualties ===
Roskill in 1962 and Richard Woodman in 2004 wrote that the Germans managed to sink thirteen merchant ships for a loss of four U-boats and 44 aircraft including 38 torpedo-bombers and six long-range bombers and reconnaissance aircraft. Michael Howard recorded that the Allies lost 38 aircraft from 309, 126 tanks from 448 and 85 of the 106 lorries carried in the convoy. Convoy PQ 19 was assembled at Loch Ewe but not dispatched, a net loss to the Allied war effort.

== Merchant ships ==
=== Loch Ewe to Arkhangelsk ===
Main body (Loch Ewe to Arkhangelsk)
Name	Year	Flag	GRT	Notes
SS Africander	1921	Panama	5,441	Sunk, aircraft
MV Atheltemplar	1930	Merchant Navy	8,992	Damaged by U-457, sunk by U-408, 16 killed
SS Beauregard	—	United States	5,976	Engine trouble, returned to Loch Ewe
RFA Black Ranger	1941	Royal Navy	3,417	Fleet oiler
SS Campfire	1919	United States	5,671	
SS Charles R. McCormick	1920	United States	6,027	
SS Copeland	1923	Merchant Navy	1,526	Rescue ship
SS Dan-y-Bryn	1940	Merchant Navy	5,117	Vice-Commodore
SS Empire Baffin	1941	Merchant Navy	6,978	
SS Empire Beaumont	1942	Merchant Navy	7,044	Sunk in air attack
SS Empire Morn	1941	Merchant Navy	7,092	CAM ship
SS Empire Snow	1941	Merchant Navy	6,327	
SS Empire Stevenson	1941	Merchant Navy	6,209	Sunk in air attack
SS Empire Tristram	1942	Merchant Navy	7,167	
SS Esek Hopkins	1942	United States	7,191	
SS Goolistan	1929	Merchant Navy	5,851	
RFA Gray Ranger	1941	Royal Navy	3,313	Fleet oiler
SS Hollywood	1920	United States	5,498	
SS John Penn	1942	United States	7,177	Sunk in air attack
SS Kentucky	1921	United States	5,446	Sunk in air attack
SS Lafayette	1919	United States	5,887	
SS Macbeth	1920	Panama	4,941	Sunk in air attack
SS Mary Luckenbach	1919	United States	5,049	Sunk in air attack
SS Meanticut	1921	United States	6,061	
SS Nathanael Greene	1942	United States	7,177	
SS Ocean Faith	1942	Merchant Navy	7,174	
RFA Oligarch	1918	Royal Navy	6,894	Fleet oiler Joined from Spitzbergen group
SS Oliver Ellsworth	1942	United States	7,191	Sunk by U-408, 1 killed
SS Oregonian	1917	United States	4,862	Sunk in air attack
SS Patrick Henry	1941	United States	7,191	
SS Sahale	1919	United States	5,028	
SS Schoharie	1919	United States	4,971	
SS St. Olaf	1942	United States	7,191	
SS Temple Arch	1940	Merchant Navy	5,138	Convoy Commodore E. K. Boddam-Whetham
SS Virginia Dare	1942	United States	7,177	
SS Wacosta	1920	United States	5,432	Sunk in air attack
SS White Clover	1920	Panama	5,462	
SS William Moultrie	1942	United States	7,177	

=== Loch Ewe to Reykjavík ===
Loch Ewe to Reykjavík group
Name	Year	Flag	GRT	Notes
SS Gateway City	1920	United States	5,432	Loch Ewe to Reykjavík only
SS Oremar	1919	United States	6,854	
SS San Zotico	1919	United Kingdom	5,582	

=== Reykjavík to Arkhangelsk ===
Reykjavík to Archangel group
Name	Year	Flag	GRT	Notes
SS Andre Marti	1918	Soviet Union	2,352	Joined from Reykjavík
SS Exford	1919	United States	4,969	
SS Komiles	1932	Soviet Union	3,966	
SS Petrovski	1921	Soviet Union	3,771	
SS Richard Bassett	1942	United States	7,191	Joined from, returned to, Reykjavík, engine trouble
SS Stalingrad	1931	Soviet Union	3,559	joined from Reykjavík, sunk by U-408, 21 killed
SS Sukhona	1918	Soviet Union	3,124	Sunk in air attack
SS Tbilisi	1912	Soviet Union	7,169	
