= HMS Bryony (K192) =

Flower-class corvette

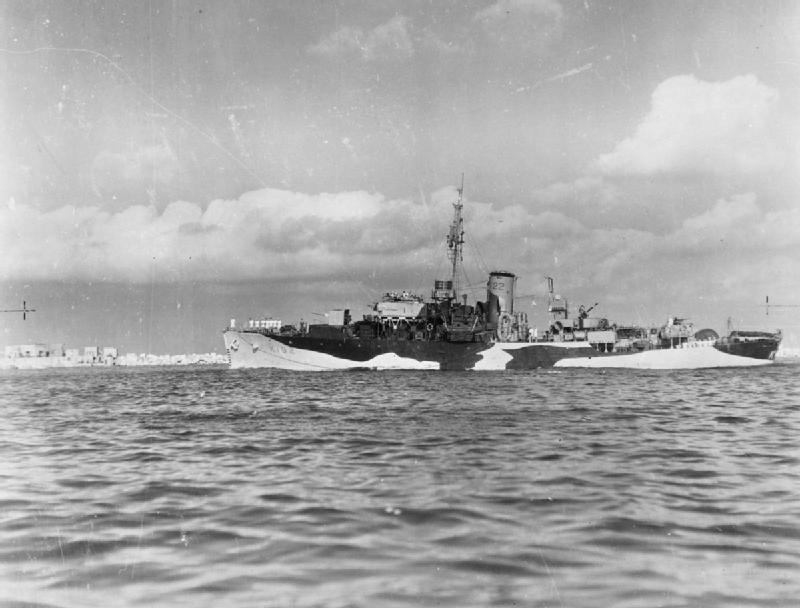

History

United Kingdom
- Name: HMS Bryony
- Ordered: 8 April 1940
- Builder: Harland & Wolff, Belfast, Northern Ireland
- Yard number: 1102
- Laid down: 16 November 1940
- Launched: 15 March 1941
- Completed: 16 June 1942
- Out of service: Sold to the Royal Norwegian Navy in 1948
- Identification: Pennant number: K192
- Motto: Quid habeo idem teneo; (Latin: "What I Have, the same I hold")

Norway
- Name: Polarfront II
- Acquired: 1948
- Stricken: 1979
- Fate: Scrapped 1980

General characteristics
- Class & type: Flower-class corvette
- Displacement: 940 tons
- Length: 205 ft (62 m)
- Beam: 33 ft (10 m)
- Draught: 11.5 ft (3.5 m)
- Propulsion: Two fire tube boilers; one 4-cycle triple-expansion steam engine
- Speed: 16 knots (30 km/h) at 2,750 hp (2,050 kW)
- Range: 3,500 nautical miles at 12 knots (6,500 km at 22 km/h)
- Complement: 85 men
- Armament: 1 × BL 4-inch (101.6 mm) Mk IX gun; 2 × .50 inch (12.7 mm) twin machine guns; 2 × .303 inch (7.7-mm) Lewis machine guns; 2 × stern depth charge racks with 40 depth charges

HMS Bryony was a Flower-class corvette that served in the Royal Navy and Royal Norwegian Navy.

== Construction and damage ==
She was laid down at the yards of Harland & Wolff, Belfast, Northern Ireland on 16 November 1940, having been ordered on 8 April of that year. She was launched on 15 March 1941 but on 15 April during an air raid on Harland and Wolff's yards Bryony was sunk by a direct hit. Her upper deck and superstructure were wrecked, and most of her hull plates were blown off, whilst the remainder of the hull was flooded. She was inspected by officials from Harland and Wolff and the Admiralty, and it was decided that it would be feasible to refloat and rebuild the ship.

== Salvage and working up ==
These events would give her the longest build time for any of the Flower class. She was built as a short fo'c'sle corvette, but after her salvage she was given a lengthened fo'c'sle and minesweeping gear. Although many Flowers eventually got the lengthened fo'c'sle, Bryony's was much longer than normal and she could be discerned by such. She was finally commissioned into the Royal Navy on 15 March 1941, under Lieutenant Commander Stewart of the Royal Naval Reserve. She left Belfast, crossing the Irish Sea to Tobermory in Scotland to undergo a two-week work and training exercise period, after which she sailed to Gladstone Dock, Liverpool, where she would be based until June 1943. Whilst in her trials period she was assigned to escort Convoy PQ 18, the next attempt to deliver supplies to Russia after the heavy losses sustained amongst Convoy PQ 17.

== With convoy PQ 18 ==
The convoy had mostly assembled by 1 September 1942 in Loch Ewe, and departed the following day. By 12 September a long-range Focke-Wulf Fw 200 Condor aircraft had detected and begun to shadow the convoy, directing German U-boats to the scene. Eventually seven U-boats were shadowing the convoy; these were for the moment kept at bay by Grumman Avenger anti-submarine aircraft and the escorts. On 14 September, U-457 penetrated the screen and torpedoed the tanker SS Atheltemplar in the engine room. Crippled, the ship was abandoned, as there were no spare ships available to tow her to Spitsbergen.

The next large wave of attacks came on 19 September as the convoy crossed the Dvina Bar. Twelve Junkers Ju 88s attacked the convoy, one of them dive bombing Bryony. The bombs fell wide and Bryony was unscathed. The convoy finally reached Archangel without further incident. Thirteen merchant ships had been lost, whilst the Germans had lost three U-boats and twenty-two aircraft.

== Postwar ==
Bryony returned to home waters and continued to serve as an escort and patrol vessel off the coast and in the North Sea. After the end of the war, she was sold to the Royal Norwegian Navy in 1948. They renamed her Polarfront II, and used her as a weather ship. She was sold in 1979 and broken up in the following year.
