= SS Empire Beaumont =

World War II merchant ship of the United Kingdom

History
- Name: Empire Beaumont
- Owner: Ministry of War Transport
- Operator: W Runciman & Co Ltd
- Port of registry: (United Kingdom) Middlesbrough
- Builder: Furness Shipbuilding Co Ltd, Haverton Hill-on-Tees
- Yard number: 345
- Laid down: 15 August 1941
- Launched: 31 March 1942
- Completed: June 1942
- Identification: UK Official Number 164854; Code Letters BDWD
- Fate: Torpedoed and sunk, 13 September 1942

General characteristics
- Type: Cargo ship
- Tonnage: 7,044 GRT
- Length: 431 ft 3 in (131.45 m)
- Beam: 56 ft 2 in (17.12 m)
- Depth: 35 ft 2 in (10.72 m)
- Propulsion: One triple expansion steam engine

Location of the sinking of Empire Beaumont.

Empire Beaumont was a British 7,044 GRT cargo ship which was built by Furness Shipbuilding Ltd, Haverton Hill-on-Tees in 1942. She was owned by the Ministry of War Transport (MoWT) and managed by W Runciman & Co Ltd. Empire Beaumont had a short career, being sunk on 13 September 1942 while a member of Convoy PQ 18.

== Description ==
Empire Beaumont was built by Furness Shipbuilding Co Ltd, Haverton Hill-on-Tees. She was yard number 345 and was laid down on 15 August 1941 Empire Beatrice was launched on 31 March 1942 and completed in June that year. She had a GRT of 7,044. Her port of registry was Middlesbrough. Empire Beaumont was managed by W Runciman & Co Ltd for the MoWT.

== Career ==
Empire Beaumont was a member of a number of convoys during the Second World War.

UR 32 Convoy UR 32 sailed from Loch Ewe on 11 July 1942 and was destined for Reykjavík, Iceland. Arrival was on or about 16 July.

PQ 18 Convoy PQ 18 sailed from Loch Ewe on 2 September 1942 and arrived at Arkhangelsk on 12 September. At 15:15 on 13 September, Empire Beaumont was attacked by Heinkel He 111 aircraft of KG26 and torpedoed. Empire Beaumont was still afloat at 16:45 although it was believed that she had sunk by 18:30. Thirty-three survivors were rescued by HMS Sharpshooter. The majority of them were transferred to HMS Scylla and five were landed at Arkhangelsk for transfer to SS Empire Bard. Those lost on Empire Beaumont are commemorated at the Tower Hill Memorial, London.

== Official Numbers and Code Letters ==
Official numbers were a forerunner to IMO Numbers. Empire Beaumont had the UK Official Number 164854 and used the Code Letters BDWD.

== Propulsion ==
Empire Beaumont was propelled by a triple expansion steam engine which had cylinders of 24 1/2 inches (62 cm), 39 inches (99 cm), and 70 inches (180 cm) diameter by 48 inches (120 cm) stroke. It was built by Richardsons, Westgarth & Co Ltd, Hartlepool.
