= HMS Offa (G29) =

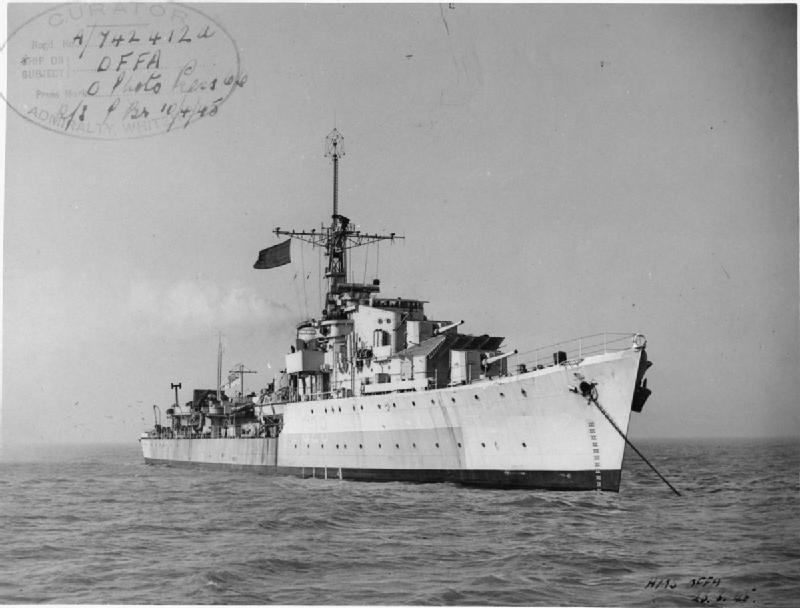
- HMS Offa

History

United Kingdom
- Name: Offa
- Ordered: 3 September 1939
- Builder: Fairfield Shipbuilding and Engineering Company, Govan
- Laid down: 15 January 1940
- Launched: 11 March 1941
- Commissioned: 20 September 1941
- Fate: Transferred to Pakistan, 30 November 1949

Pakistan
- Name: Tariq
- Acquired: 30 November 1949
- Identification: Pennant number: G29
- Fate: Scrapped 1959

General characteristics
- Class & type: O-class destroyer
- Displacement: 1,610 long tons (1,640 t) (standard)
- Length: 345 ft (105.2 m) (o/a)
- Beam: 35 ft (10.7 m)
- Draught: 13 ft 6 in (4.1 m)
- Installed power: 2 × Admiralty 3-drum boilers; 40,000 shp (29,828 kW)
- Propulsion: 2 × shafts; 2 × geared steam turbines
- Speed: 37 knots (69 km/h; 43 mph)
- Range: 3,850 nmi (7,130 km; 4,430 mi) at 20 knots (37 km/h; 23 mph)
- Complement: 176+
- Armament: 4 × single QF 4.7 in (120 mm) guns; 1 × single QF 4 in (102 mm) AA gun; 1 × quad 2 pdr (40 mm (1.6 in)) AA gun; 4 × single 20 mm (0.8 in) AA guns; 1 × quadruple 21 in (533 mm) torpedo tubes; 4 × throwers and 2 × racks for 70 depth charges

HMS Offa was an O-class destroyer of the Royal Navy which entered service in 1941 and was scrapped in 1959.

== Service history ==
=== Second World War service ===
During November 1941 Offa was part of the escort of Convoy PQ 4, the fifth of the Arctic Convoys of the Second World War. The convoy sailed from Hvalfjord, Iceland on 17 November 1941 and arrived at Arkhangelsk on 28 November 1941.

On 14 September 1942 Offa (Lt.Cdr. R.A. Ewing) picked up survivors from the British tanker Atheltemplar which had been damaged by a torpedo from the German submarine U-457 south west of Bear Island.

On 26 January 1944 Offa picked up survivors from the British merchant Fort Bellingham that was sunk by a torpedo from the German submarine U-957 in the Barents Sea north of North Cape.

She took part in the King's Birthday celebrations at Kiel on 2 June 1945 together with HMS Obedient

=== Postwar service ===
In 1946 Offa served as a target ship for submarines, until being placed in reserve at Devonport in February 1948. In April 1948 she was refitted at Devonport and on 30 November 1949 she was transferred to Pakistan and renamed Tariq.

She was returned to the Royal Navy at Portsmouth in July 1959. She was then scrapped, arriving at Sunderland on 13 October 1959.
