= Alastair Ewing =

Royal Navy Vice Admiral (1909–1997)

Vice-Admiral Sir Alastair Ewing KBE CB DSC
- Born: 10 April 1909; Roxburghshire, Scotland
- Died: 19 May 1997 (aged 88); Winchester, Hampshire
- Relatives: Diana Archer (m. 1940; died 1980) Anne Chichester (m. 1984)
- Military career
- Allegiance: United Kingdom
- Branch: Royal Navy
- Service years: 1923–1962
- Rank: Vice-Admiral
- Commands: HMS Cattistock; HMS Offa; HMS Diomede; HMS Cheviot
- Conflicts: World War II
- Awards: Knight Commander of the Order of the British Empire; Companion of the Order of the Bath

Vice-Admiral Sir Robert Alastair Ewing KBE CB DSC (10 April 1909 – 19 May 1997) was a Royal Navy officer who became Naval Secretary.

== Naval career ==
Educated at the Royal Naval College, Dartmouth, Ewing joined the Royal Navy in 1923. He served in World War II and was given command of the destroyer HMS Cattistock in 1940. As Captain of the destroyer HMS Offa, he took part in the Commando raid on Vågsøy in western Norway in December 1941 during the Norwegian Campaign and then saw the disintegration of Convoy PQ 17 on its way to Russia as 23 of its 36 ships were lost in July 1942 during convoy work. In 1943 he was given command of the cruiser HMS Diomede. He was twice mentioned in dispatches.

After the War he was given command of the destroyer HMS Cheviot. He was appointed to the NATO Standing Group Staff in 1950 and took command of the battleship HMS Vanguard in 1953 before becoming Director at the Naval Staff College at Greenwich in 1954. He went on to be Naval Secretary in 1956, Flag Officer Flotillas (Mediterranean) in 1958 and Flag Officer commanding the Reserves and Inspector of Recruiting in 1960. He was promoted to vice-admiral on 22 July 1960, before retiring in 1962.

In retirement he became a yacht broker in Florida.

== Family ==
In 1940, he married Diana Archer, and they had a son. Following the death of his first wife, he married Anne Chichester in 1984.

Military offices
Preceded by David Luce	Naval Secretary; 1956–1958	Succeeded by John Hamilton
