= MV Atheltemplar =

History

United Kingdom
- Name: MV Atheltemplar
- Operator: United Molasses Co Ltd, London (1930–1940); Athel Lines Ltd (1940–43)
- Port of registry: Liverpool
- Builder: Lithgows, Port Glasgow, Scotland
- Yard number: 843
- Launched: 15 April 1930
- Completed: 1930
- Out of service: 14 September 1942
- Identification: UK official number 161160; code letters LGBH (1930–33); Call sign GJYQ (1934–42)
- Fate: Sunk on 14 September 1942

General characteristics
- Class & type: Molasses tanker
- Tonnage: 8,939 GRT
- Length: 475 ft (144.78 m)
- Beam: 63 ft 5 in (19.33 m)
- Depth: 35 ft (10.67 m)
- Installed power: 709 NHP
- Propulsion: Twin screws powered by 2 x 6-cylinder 4-stroke single-acting diesel engines (John G. Kincaid & Company, Greenock)
- Speed: 11 knots (20 km/h)
- Capacity: 9,400 tons of Admiralty fuel oil
- Crew: 44 (early Second World War); 61 (Arctic convoys)
- Armament: Early Second World War: 1 × 4.7" gun; 1 × 12-pounder AA gun; 4 × Lewis .303" machine guns; 1 × barrage kite

MV Atheltemplar was a motor tanker built by Lithgows, Port Glasgow. She was launched on 15 April 1930, registered in Liverpool and operated by the United Molasses Co Ltd of London. She was transferred to Athel Lines on 1 January 1940.

== Early wartime career ==
Atheltemplar's first recorded voyage during the Second World War was to Abadan on the Persian Shatt al-Arab. She departed home waters with Convoy OB 10 and returned to Gibraltar with her cargo before sailing east again to Port Said.

Atheltemplar returned to Great Britain with Convoy HG 9 which left Port Said on 19 November 1939, but on the afternoon of 14 December 1939, she struck a mine laid by German destroyers off the Tyne Estuary. The destroyers HMS Kelly and HMS Mohawk were sent as escorts for the rescue tugs Great Emperor, Joffre and Langton. During the operation Kelly also struck a mine and sustained damage to her hull. While Mowhawk put a party aboard Atheltemplar, and Joffre and Langton took the tanker under tow, Kelly herself was taken in tow by Great Emperor and returned to the Tyne.

After repairs, Atheltemplar returned to service on 9 April 1940 and sailed to Bermuda before returning to home waters with Convoy HX 42. During late May and early June 1940 she was involved in Operation Dynamo, during which she bunkered Royal Navy destroyers and was attacked by the Luftwaffe several times in and around Dover Harbour. More transatlantic crossings followed, including a homeward-bound voyage in Convoy HX 84 which was attacked by the German German cruiser Admiral Scheer. Atheltemplar and her sister-ship Athelempress managed to escape unscathed.

Atheltemplar then made a series of coastal voyages in home waters before undergoing refit in Smith's Yard, North Shields in the winter of 1940–41. Sailing for Methil Roads on 25 February 1941, she joined the 26-ship Convoy EN 79 which departed Methil on 1 March 1941, bound for the Atlantic convoy marshalling area at Loch Ewe on the west coast of Scotland. Sailing northbound in ballast, Atheltemplar was the convoy's Vice-Commodore ship, positioned at the head of the starboard column of vessels when, with darkness falling, Convoy EN 79 was attacked off the Aberdeenshire coast by Heinkel He 111 bombers from Luftwaffe KG26, a combat group based in Denmark. Atheltemplar bore the brunt of the attack and was struck on the navigation bridge superstructure by two 250 kg bombs; at least five members of the crew were killed instantly (12 crew died during the incident), and a fire swept the vessel forcing the survivors to abandon ship. One of the He 111s was hit by defensive fire from SS Tewkesbury, and subsequently ditched off the Banffshire coast; the crew was captured. Atheltemplar's survivors were taken aboard the Halcyon-class minesweeper HMS Leda. Another Halcyon-class minesweeper, HMS Speedwell, fought the blaze and then took Atheltemplar in tow. Taken initially to the Imperial Dock at Leith, Atheltemplar later returned to Smith's Dock for extensive repairs; she resumed trading in June 1941. The remains of five unidentified members of her crew ("Known only unto God"), killed during the 1 March 1941 air attack, lie within a marked Commonwealth War Grave towards the south-east corner of New Calton Burial Ground in Edinburgh, about 2 miles (3 km) south of Port Leith.

== Convoy PQ 18 ==
Later in the Second World War Atheltemplar was used on convoys to carry fuel oil and supplies to the Kola Inlet and the northern Soviet ports of Arkhangelsk and Murmansk. The first of these was Convoy PQ 14 which arrived in Murmansk on 19 April 1942. On this voyage Atheltemplar was damaged by ice and she was repaired in Murmansk before sailing for the return journey with Convoy QP 11. This Convoy was attacked by German destroyers, U-boats and torpedo bombers; once again Atheltemplar was damaged but it is not clear whether the cause was ice, enemy action or both. After reaching Iceland on 7 May 1942, Atheltemplar then returned to North Shields for repairs (and possibly for the fitment of additional anti-aircraft defensive armament). She left the Tyne on 21 June 1942 for Loch Ewe and Iceland, arriving at Reykjavik on 16 July. On 7 September 1942 she sailed to join Convoy PQ 18 which had departed Loch Ewe on 2 September 1942. This was the next attempt to supply the Soviet Union since the disastrous losses sustained by the previous Convoy PQ 17. Atheltemplar, carrying 9,400 tons of Admiralty fuel oil plus 63 tons of dry stores, was to travel with the convoy to Archangel via Hvalfjörður, Iceland, commanded by her Master, Carl Ray.

The convoy was spotted by German aircraft on 10 September; then on 12 September, Royal Navy Sea Hurricane fighters - flying from the escort carrier HMS Avenger - drove off a Luftwaffe BV 138 flying boat which was attempting to shadow the convoy. Luftwaffe patrol aircraft returned the following day to vector U-boats towards the convoy. At about 0830 BST (GMT +2) on 13 September, two ships were attacked by U-boats, one sinking within minutes. Later, at about 1100, several Luftwaffe Ju 88 bombers of KG30 (based at Petsamo) attacked PQ 18. A series of U-boat alerts followed, and then at about 1500 a large formation of He 111s and Ju 88s of KG26 attacked with bombs and at least 30 torpedoes; eight of the convoy's ships were sunk. Further air attacks occurred at 2100 hrs, during which one of Atheltemplar's gunners succeeded in downing a Ju 88. At 0310 hours on 14 September U-457 penetrated the protective ring of escorts and attacked the convoy southwest of Bear Island. Despite reporting the sinking of one tanker and one other ship, and having damaged a Javelin-class destroyer, the U-boat's only success was to have torpedoed the Atheltemplar.

The crew immediately abandoned the burning tanker. The master, 42 crew members and 18 gunners were picked up by the British rescue ship Copeland and the O-class destroyer HMS Offa. They were then transferred to the Halcyon-class minesweepers HMS Harrier and HMS Sharpshooter, and later the Dido-class cruiser HMS Scylla. Atheltemplar settled low at the stern but, although disabled, seemed to be able to remain afloat. HMS Harrier briefly took Atheltemplar in tow but, as a prolonged tow of the ship would have been hazardous given the constant enemy threat, it was decided that the Atheltemplar should be scuttled. HMS Tartar tried to sink Atheltemplar with gunfire and depth charges, but failed and returned to the convoy. Then, at 14.30 hours, U-408 came across the capsized wreck of the Atheltemplar, by now drifting north of Bear Island, and sank her with her 88 mm gun at position 76°00′N 18°00′E. The survivors of the Atheltemplar were landed at Scapa Flow. The master of the rescue ship Copeland, W.J. Hartley, was awarded the Lloyd's War Medal for Bravery at Sea, for his actions in rescuing Atheltemplar's crew.

By the time of her sinking, Atheltemplar had completed at least 19 wartime Atlantic crossings, had sailed some 102,500 miles, and delivered 140,200 tons of essential fuel oil and molasses. 17 men died aboard her in the War.

== Official number, code letters and call sign ==
Official numbers were a forerunner to IMO Numbers. Atheltemplar had the UK Official Number 161160. She had the code letters LGBH until 1933, and the Call sign GKYQ from 1934.
