= SS Santa Rosa (1916) =

Passenger/cargo ocean liner

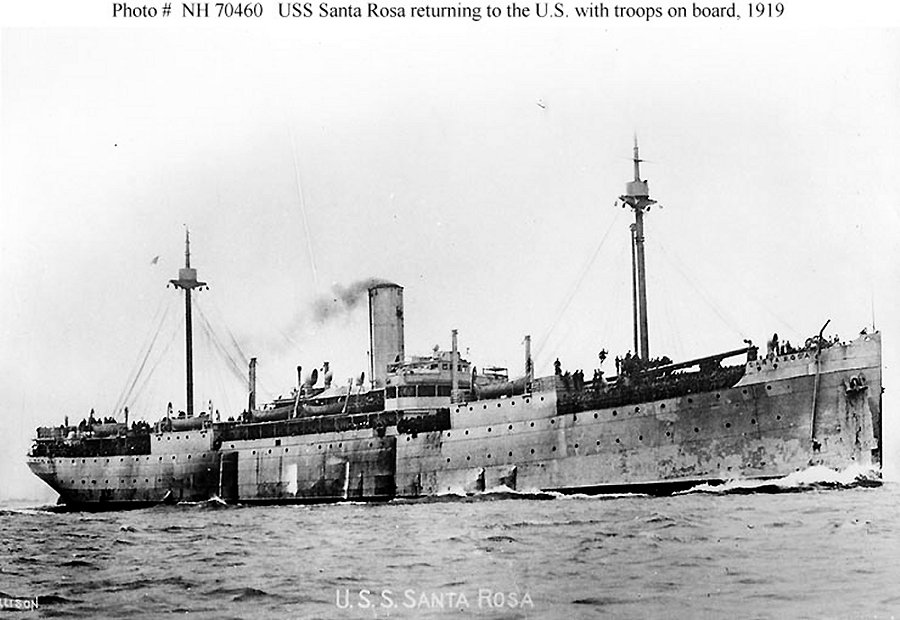
- USS Santa Rosa returning to the United States with troops on board, 1919.

History

- Name: SS Santa Rosa
- Operator: Grace Line (1917, 1919-1925)
- Port of registry: New York City
- Builder: William Cramp & Sons, Philadelphia
- Yard number: 438
- Launched: December 27, 1916
- In service: January 1917
- Fate: Sold in 1925
- Name: USAT Santa Rosa
- Operator: US Army (1917-1919)
- Port of registry: New York City
- Acquired: August 29, 1917
- Fate: Transferred to US Navy March 10, 1919
- Name: USS Santa Rosa (ID-2169)
- Operator: US Navy (1919)
- Port of registry: New York City
- Acquired: March 10, 1919
- Fate: Returned to owners October 27, 1919
- Name: SS Oregonian
- Operator: American-Hawaiian Steamship Company (1925-1942)
- Acquired: 1925
- Out of service: 1942
- Fate: Sunk by aerial torpedo, 1942

General characteristics
- Type: Passenger/Cargo Liner
- Tonnage: 6,415 GRT
- Length: 417.5 ft (127 m)
- Beam: 54.8 ft (16.7 m)
- Installed power: 1 quadruple expansion
- Propulsion: Single screw
- Speed: 12 knots (22 km/h; 14 mph)

SS Santa Rosa (later SS Oregonian) was a passenger/cargo ocean liner in service for the Grace Line and later the American-Hawaiian Steamship Company. The vessel also saw military transport service during both World War I and World War II.

Built at William Cramp & Sons Shipbuilding Company in Philadelphia, the vessel was completed in January 1917. She was named Santa Rosa and entered commercial service for the Grace Line. (Two later vessels would also carry the name Santa Rosa for Grace Line.)

After the United States entered World War I, the vessel was requisitioned by the US Army in August 1917 and became the USAT Santa Rosa. In March 1919 she was transferred to the US Navy for use as a transport and commissioned USS Santa Rosa (ID-2169). In October she was returned to her owners and resumed civilian service for the Grace Line.

On 26 December 1922, Santa Rosa ran aground at Charleston, South Carolina; she was refloated on 31 December 1922. In 1925 she was sold to the American-Hawaiian Steamship Company and renamed SS Oregonian. She served her new owners in Pacific inter-coastal service for 17 years.

On September 13, 1942, Oregonian was in the Barents Sea approximately 198 miles WNW of Bear Island as a civilian vessel in convoy PQ 18. Although armed, the convoy was immediately overwhelmed with attacks from U-boats, torpedo planes, and bombers, all launched from German-occupied Norway. Oregonian took three aerial torpedoes to her starboard side. Immediately the ship listed to starboard, rolled over, and sank. Twenty-two crew members and seven Armed Guard were killed, including her master, Harold Dowling. The fourteen surviving crew members were rescued by escort ships and eventually repatriated to the US aboard RMS Queen Mary. Oregonian's wreck is located at 76°00′N 09°30′E
