= HMS Scylla (98) =

Cruiser of the Royal Navy

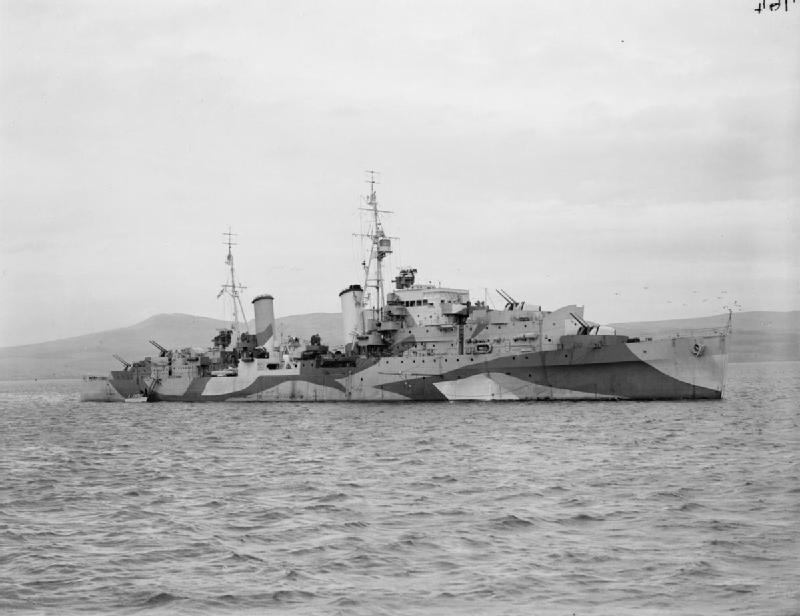
- Scylla at anchor on the Clyde, June 1942

History

United Kingdom
- Name: Scylla
- Builder: Scotts Shipbuilding and Engineering Company (Greenock, Scotland)
- Laid down: 19 April 1939
- Launched: 24 July 1940
- Commissioned: 12 June 1942
- Out of service: write-off, 23 June 1944
- Identification: Pennant number 98
- Fate: Scrapped, 4 May 1950.

General characteristics (as built)
- Class & type: Dido-class light cruiser
- Displacement: 5,600 tons standard; 6,850 tons full load
- Length: 485 ft (148 m) pp; 512 ft (156 m) oa
- Beam: 50.5 ft (15.4 m)
- Draught: 14 ft (4.3 m)
- Propulsion: 4 geared steam turbines; Four shafts; Four Admiralty 3-drum boilers; 62,000 shp (46 MW)
- Speed: 32.25 knots (59.73 km/h; 37.11 mph)
- Range: 2,414 km (1,500 miles) at 30 knots; 6,824 km (4,240 miles) at 16 knots
- Complement: 480
- Armament: 8 × 4.5 in (113 mm) dual guns; 1 × 4.0 in (102 mm) gun; 2 × 0.5 in MG quadruple guns; 3 × 2-pounder 40 mm pom-poms quad guns; 2 × 21 in (533 mm) triple torpedo tubes
- Armour: Belt: 3 inch; Deck: 1 inch; Magazines: 2 inch; Bulkheads: 1 inch

HMS Scylla was a Dido-class cruiser of the Royal Navy. She was built by Scotts Shipbuilding and Engineering Company (Greenock, Scotland), with the keel being laid down on 19 April 1939. She was launched on 24 July 1940 and commissioned 12 June 1942.

One of two sisters (the other was, appropriately, Charybdis, see Scylla and Charybdis), Scylla was completed with four twin QF 4.5 in Mk.III in UD MK III mountings because of a shortage of the intended QF 5.25 inch gun mountings.

The forward superstructure was considerably modified to accommodate the different guns and also to increase crew spaces. Known as the 'toothless terrors', they proved to be very good anti-aircraft ships, often leading to comparisons with their sisters armed with the heavier QF 5.25 in (133 mm) guns.

== History ==
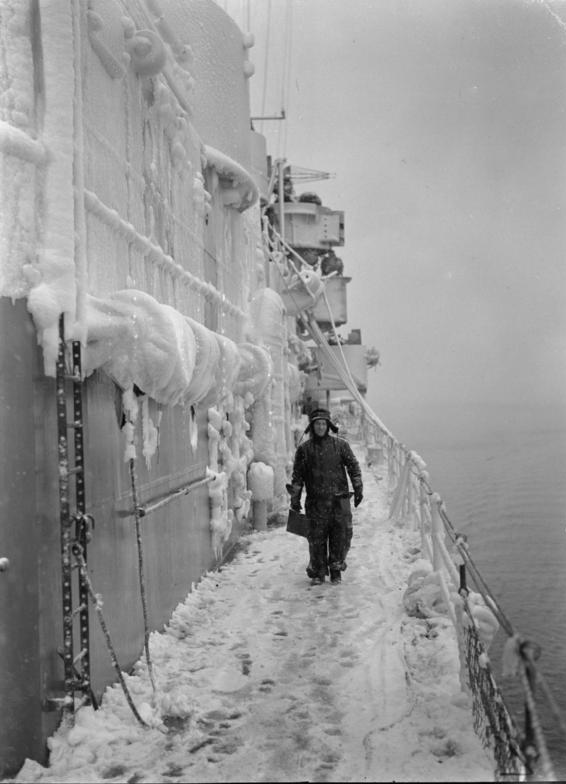
A member of crew on the snow-covered deck whilst on patrol in the North Atlantic

Scylla served with the Home Fleet escorting Arctic convoys. She was flagship of R. Adm. Robert Burnett during the battle for convoy PQ 18 in September 1942. She carried a signals intelligence team headed by F/O R. E. Gunn and on at least one trip to the Kola Peninsula she is reported as having collected Signals Intelligence (PRO HW 14/53 and 55). Scylla sailed for Gibraltar on 28 October 1942. The following month she was at the French North Africa landings (Operation Torch) as part of Force "O" with the Eastern Task Force, but in December was sent into the Bay of Biscay as part of the effort to catch homecoming Axis blockade runners.

On 31 December 1942, she was directed to the German blockade runner Rhakotis by a RAF Coastal Command Whitley from 502 Squadron based at RAF St Eval, Cornwall. The aircraft piloted by F/O Arthur Hodgson had located Rhakotis in appalling weather but after several attack runs they had run out of ammunition. The crew then shadowed the target for over an hour, reporting the vessel's position enabling Scylla to intercept Rhakotis some 200 miles (320 km) north-west of Cape Finisterre in position 45.01°N 10.50°W, where Scylla opened fire. She hit Rhakotis numerous times with her main armament before torpedoing and sinking her. F/O Hodgson was awarded the DFC for his part in the operation. In February she returned to the Home Fleet for Arctic convoys but was back in the Bay of Biscay by June 1943 to cover anti-submarine operations.

In July 1943 she stopped the Arklow schooner Mary B Mitchell in the Bay of Biscay. Captain Dowds, formerly principal of the Irish Nautical College, was captain of the schooner. The officer in charge of the boarding party was a pupil of Dowds. There was a pleasant reunion, then Mary B Mitchell resumed her voyage to Lisbon, and Scylla continued her search for blockade runners.

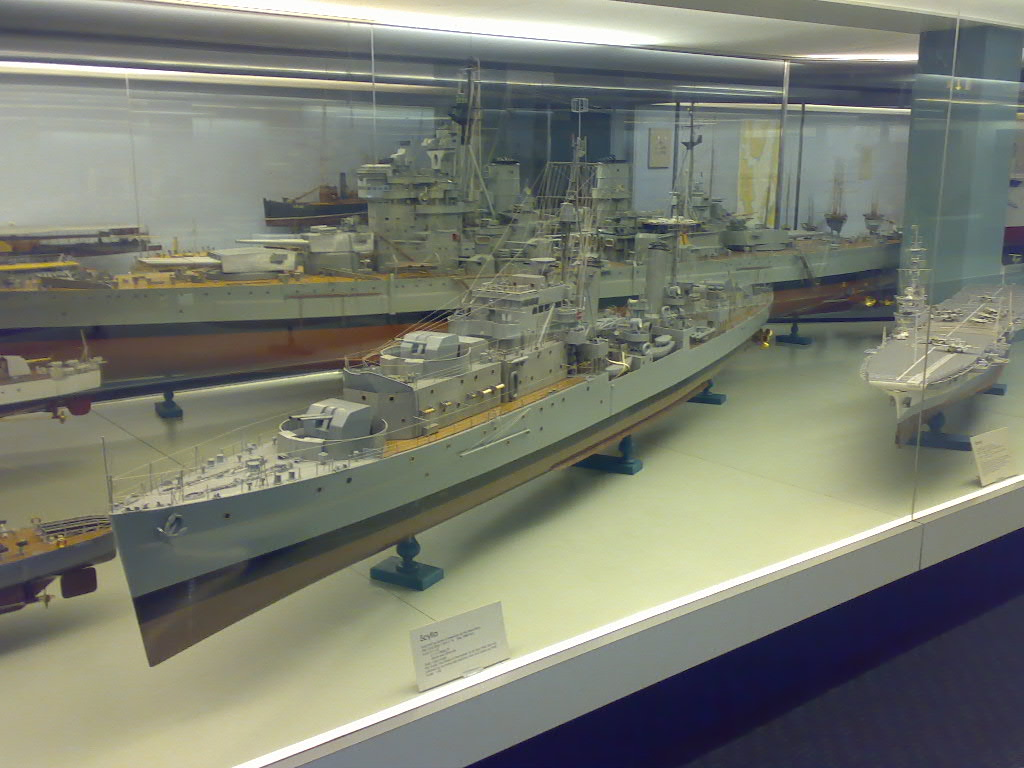
A model of Scylla at the Glasgow Museum of Transport.

In September 1943 Scylla was part of the Support Carrier Force at the Salerno landings (Operation Avalanche) but came home to refit for duty as an Escort Carrier Flagship in October, which lasted until April 1944. The Scylla was one of two Dido class cruisers fitted with, an Action Information Organisation (AIO) room (the other was HMS Royalist) to co-ordinate radar and intercept information. Scylla was the allotted RN flagship for the Normandy landings and the flagship for Vice Admiral Philip Vian and it was considered vital to all shipping and naval movements in the area, particularly that of coastal RN MTBs and enemy E boats, to prevent blue on blue incidents. She served off Normandy as flagship of the Eastern Task Force, for 18 days.

On 23 June 1944 Scylla was badly damaged by a mine and written off. Although towed to Portsmouth, she was not disposed of until 1950, after use as a target between 1948 and 1950. She arrived at Thos. W. Ward, (Barrow-in-Furness, UK) on 4 May 1950 for breaking up.
