= SS Stalingrad =

Soviet Union steamship

Coordinates: 75°52′N 7°55′E

History

Soviet Union
- Name: SS Stalingrad
- Operator: Chief Directorate of the Northern Sea Route (GUSMP)
- Builder: Zavod No 189 (Ordzhonikidze), Leningrad
- Laid down: 1931
- Completed: 1933
- Fate: Sunk on 13 September 1942

General characteristics
- Tonnage: 3,559 tons
- Crew: 87

SS Stalingrad was a steamship of the Soviet Union, named after the Soviet city of Stalingrad, itself named after Joseph Stalin. She was built at Soviet Shipyard No. 189 (Ordzhonikidze) in Leningrad and operated by Chief Directorate of the Northern Sea Route (GUSMP), who homeported her in Vladivostok. She had entered service in 1933.

== Career and sinking ==
Stalingrad was one of ten Anadyr-class cargo-passenger ships built for ice navigation in the Far East, around the port of Vladivostok. They had the unofficial name of "far-easterners". They were initially designed to be powered by diesel but were redesigned as coal powered steamers for economic reasons. Vladivostok did not have large oil stores and had to import most of its supplies, but coal was cheap and widely available in the region.

During the Second World War, Stalingrad was used in the Atlantic and Arctic Oceans to transport supplies from the United Kingdom to Russia. In September 1942, she was part of Convoy PQ 18, which left the Tyne on 2 September bound for North Russia via Reykjavík. Stalingrad was one of six Soviet merchants, and was carrying a cargo of munitions.

The convoy came under attack from the Luftwaffe and U-boats. At 09:52 on 13 September, with the convoy 100 miles south west of Spitsbergen, it was sighted by U-408, which fired a spread of three torpedoes at it. Stalingrad was hit by one torpedo and then suffered a boiler explosion. The other two torpedoes missed, but one of them hit another ship of the convoy, Oliver Ellsworth, which had to steer hard left to avoid the torpedoed Stalingrad.

Stalingrad had been hit amidships on her starboard side on one of her coal bunkers. She sank in just three minutes and 48 seconds. The crew members and passengers had to abandon ship in the port lifeboats because the starboard ones had been destroyed by the explosion. Further losses occurred when one of the boats capsized when it reached the water. Out of a complement of 87, 21 were killed, with 66 survivors being picked up by other ships of the convoy.
