= SS Oliver Ellsworth =

Liberty ship of WWII

- SS Oliver Ellsworth

History

United States
- Name: Oliver Ellsworth
- Namesake: Oliver Ellsworth
- Owner: War Shipping Administration (WSA)
- Operator: Agwilines Inc.
- Ordered: as type (EC2-S-C1) hull, MCE hull 42
- Awarded: 14 March 1941
- Builder: Bethlehem-Fairfield Shipyard, Baltimore, Maryland
- Cost: $1,051,644
- Yard number: 2029
- Way number: 6
- Laid down: 31 March 1942
- Launched: 4 June 1942
- Sponsored by: Miss Frances T. Cwalina
- Completed: 22 June 1942
- Fate: Sunk, 13 September 1942

General characteristics
- Class & type: Liberty ship; type EC2-S-C1, standard
- Tonnage: 10,865 LT DWT; 7,176 GRT
- Displacement: 3,380 long tons (3,434 t) (light); 14,245 long tons (14,474 t) (max)
- Length: 441 feet 6 inches (135 m) oa; 416 feet (127 m) pp; 427 feet (130 m) lwl
- Beam: 57 feet (17 m)
- Draft: 27 ft 9.25 in (8.4646 m)
- Installed power: 2 × Oil fired 450 °F (232 °C) boilers, operating at 220 psi (1,500 kPa); 2,500 hp (1,900 kW)
- Propulsion: 1 × triple-expansion steam engine, (manufactured by Clark Bros. Co., Cleveland, Ohio); 1 × screw propeller
- Speed: 11.5 knots (21.3 km/h; 13.2 mph)
- Capacity: 562,608 cubic feet (15,931 m^{3}) (grain); 499,573 cubic feet (14,146 m^{3}) (bale)
- Complement: 38–62 USMM; 21–40 USNAG
- Armament: Varied by ship; Bow-mounted 3-inch (76 mm)/50-caliber gun; Stern-mounted 4-inch (102 mm)/50-caliber gun; 2–8 × single 20-millimeter (0.79 in) Oerlikon anti-aircraft (AA) cannons and/or, 2–8 × 37-millimeter (1.46 in) M1 AA guns

SS Oliver Ellsworth was a Liberty ship built in the United States during World War II. She was named after Founding Father Oliver Ellsworth, an American lawyer, judge, politician, and diplomat. He was a framer of the United States Constitution, a United States senator from Connecticut, and the third Chief Justice of the United States.

== Construction ==
Oliver Ellsworth was laid down on 31 March 1942, under a Maritime Commission (MARCOM) contract, MCE hull 42, by the Bethlehem-Fairfield Shipyard, Baltimore, Maryland; she was sponsored by Miss Frances T. Cwalina, an Honor Student at Benjamin Franklin Junior High School, Brooklyn, Maryland, and was launched on 22 June 1942.

== History ==
She was allocated to A.H. Bull & Co., Inc., on 6 June 1942.

=== Sinking ===
Oliver Ellsworth was just three months old when she was assigned to Convoy PQ 18, one of the Arctic convoys delivering supplies to the Soviet Union. She carried 7,200 long tons (7,300 t) of ammunition and aircraft as deck cargo. She was commanded by her Master, Otto Ernest Buford.

On 13 September 1942, U-408, sighted the Convoy PQ 18, about 100 mi (160 km) southwest of Spitsbergen, and fired a spread of three torpedoes at 09:52. One of the torpedoes struck the Soviet merchant ship SS Stalingrad and ruptured her boiler. The other two torpedoes missed her, but one of them hit Oliver Ellsworth which had had to steer hard to port to avoid Stalingrad.

The torpedo struck Oliver Ellsworth on her starboard side between holds #4 and #5. After immediately securing the engines, the crew of eight officers, 34 crewmen, and 28 Armed guards quickly abandoned the stricken ship in four lifeboats, due to fear of their cargo of ammunition exploding. Because Oliver Ellsworth continued her forward momentum, both starboard lifeboats were swamped and one of her port lifeboats struck a raft and sank. Within an hour the rescue ship Copeland and the A/S trawler HMS St. Kenan, had picked up all the survivors; they were later landed at Archangel. After the rescue, St. Kenan scuttled Oliver Ellsworth by firing several shells into the drifting wreck. She sank stern first near 75°52′N 7°55′E at 10:30. Out of a complement of 70, all had been rescued except for one armed guard who drowned.

== Bibliography ==
- "Bethlehem-Fairfield, Baltimore MD". www.ShipbuildingHistory.com. 14 August 2008.
- Maritime Administration. "Oliver Ellsworth". Ship History Database Vessel Status Card. U.S. Department of Transportation, Maritime Administration.
- Davies, James (May 2004). "Specifications (As-Built)" (PDF). p. 23.
- "SS Oliver Ellsworth".
- "Oliver Ellsworth".
