= German submarine U-408 =

German World War II submarine

History

Nazi Germany
- Name: U-408
- Ordered: 16 October 1939
- Builder: Danziger Werft, Danzig
- Yard number: 109
- Laid down: 30 September 1940
- Launched: 16 July 1941
- Commissioned: 19 November 1941
- Fate: Sunk on 5 November 1942, north of Iceland

General characteristics
- Class & type: Type VIIC submarine
- Displacement: 769 tonnes (757 long tons) surfaced; 871 t (857 long tons) submerged
- Length: 67.10 m (220 ft 2 in) o/a; 50.50 m (165 ft 8 in) pressure hull
- Beam: 6.20 m (20 ft 4 in) o/a; 4.70 m (15 ft 5 in) pressure hull
- Height: 9.60 m (31 ft 6 in)
- Draught: 4.74 m (15 ft 7 in)
- Installed power: 2,800–3,200 PS (2,100–2,400 kW; 2,800–3,200 bhp) (diesels); 750 PS (550 kW; 740 shp) (electric)
- Propulsion: 2 shafts; 2 × diesel engines; 2 × electric motors.
- Speed: 17.7 knots (32.8 km/h; 20.4 mph) surfaced; 7.6 knots (14.1 km/h; 8.7 mph) submerged
- Range: 8,500 nmi (15,700 km; 9,800 mi) at 10 knots (19 km/h; 12 mph) surfaced; 80 nmi (150 km; 92 mi) at 4 knots (7.4 km/h; 4.6 mph) submerged
- Test depth: 230 m (750 ft); Crush depth: 250–295 m (820–968 ft)
- Complement: 4 officers, 40–56 enlisted
- Armament: 5 × 53.3 cm (21 in) torpedo tubes (four bow, one stern); 14 × torpedoes; 1 × 8.8 cm (3.46 in) deck gun (220 rounds); 1 x 2 cm (0.79 in) C/30 AA gun

Service record
- Part of: 5th U-boat Flotilla; 19 November 1941 – 30 April 1942; 9th U-boat Flotilla; 1 May – 30 June 1942; 11th U-boat Flotilla; 1 July – 5 November 1942
- Identification codes: M 47 966
- Commanders: K.Kapt. Reinhard von Hymmen; 19 November 1941 – 5 November 1942
- Operations: 3 patrols: 1st patrol: a. 7 June – 16 July 1942; b. 18 – 20 July 1942; c. 3 – 5 September 1942; 2nd patrol: 10 – 26 September 1943; 3rd patrol: 31 October – 5 November 1942
- Victories: 3 merchant ships sunk (19,689 GRT)

German submarine U-408 was a Type VIIC U-boat of Nazi Germany's Kriegsmarine during World War II.

She carried out three patrols. She sank three ships.

She was a member of two wolfpacks.

She was sunk by a US aircraft north of Iceland on 5 November 1942.

== Design ==
German Type VIIC submarines were preceded by the shorter Type VIIB submarines. U-408 had a displacement of 769 tonnes (757 long tons) when at the surface and 871 tonnes (857 long tons) while submerged. She had a total length of 67.10 m (220 ft 2 in), a pressure hull length of 50.50 m (165 ft 8 in), a beam of 6.20 m (20 ft 4 in), a height of 9.60 m (31 ft 6 in), and a draught of 4.74 m (15 ft 7 in). The submarine was powered by two Germaniawerft F46 four-stroke, six-cylinder supercharged diesel engines producing a total of 2,800 to 3,200 metric horsepower (2,060 to 2,350 kW; 2,760 to 3,160 shp) for use while surfaced, two Siemens-Schuckert GU 343/38–8 double-acting electric motors producing a total of 750 metric horsepower (550 kW; 740 shp) for use while submerged. She had two shafts and two 1.23 m (4 ft) propellers. The boat was capable of operating at depths of up to 230 metres (750 ft).

The submarine had a maximum surface speed of 17.7 knots (32.8 km/h; 20.4 mph) and a maximum submerged speed of 7.6 knots (14.1 km/h; 8.7 mph). When submerged, the boat could operate for 80 nautical miles (150 km; 92 mi) at 4 knots (7.4 km/h; 4.6 mph); when surfaced, she could travel 8,500 nautical miles (15,700 km; 9,800 mi) at 10 knots (19 km/h; 12 mph). U-408 was fitted with five 53.3 cm (21 in) torpedo tubes (four fitted at the bow and one at the stern), fourteen torpedoes, one 8.8 cm (3.46 in) SK C/35 naval gun, 220 rounds, and a 2 cm (0.79 in) C/30 anti-aircraft gun. The boat had a complement of between forty-four and sixty.

== Service history ==
The submarine was laid down on 30 September 1940 at the Danziger Werft at Danzig (now Gdansk) as yard number 109, launched on 16 July 1941 and commissioned on 19 November under the command of Korvettenkapitän Reinhard von Hymmen.

She served with the 5th U-boat Flotilla from 19 November 1941 for training and the 9th flotilla from 1 May 1942 for operations. She was reassigned to the 11th flotilla on 1 July 1942 and served with that organization until her loss.

=== First patrol ===
U-408's first patrol was preceded by a move from Kiel in Germany to Skjomenfjord in Norway. She left there for her first patrol on 7 June, sailing through the north Norwegian Sea into the Barents Sea. She returned to Skjomenfjord on 16 July 1942.

=== Second patrol ===
The boat set-out on her second foray on 10 September 1942. She sank Stalingrad on the 13th, 100 nmi (190 km; 120 mi) southwest of Spitsbergen. She also sank Oliver Ellsworth with the same spread of torpedoes. The master of the Soviet ship, A. Sakharov, was awarded the George Cross after acting as pilot for his convoy and spending 40 minutes in the freezing water.

The next day she sank Atheltemplar south-west of Bear Island.

=== Third patrol and loss ===
The submarine's third and last sortie began from Narvik on 31 October 1942. On 5 November she was sunk by a US PBY Catalina from VP-84 north of Iceland. Her previous track was from the east, towards the Denmark Strait, (which separates Greenland from Iceland).

Forty-five men died in U-408; there were no survivors.

=== Wolfpacks ===
U-408 took part in two wolfpacks, namely:

- Eisteufel (21 June – 10 July 1942)
- Trägertod (12 – 22 September 1942)

== Summary of raiding history ==
Date	Ship Name	Nationality	Tonnage (GRT)	Fate
13 September 1942	Oliver Ellsworth	United States	7,191	Sunk
13 September 1942	Stalingrad	Soviet Union	3,559	Sunk
14 September 1942	Atheltemplar	United Kingdom	8,939	Sunk

== Bibliography ==
- Busch, Rainer; Röll, Hans-Joachim (1999). German U-boat commanders of World War II : a biographical dictionary. Translated by Brooks, Geoffrey. London, Annapolis, Md: Greenhill Books, Naval Institute Press. ISBN 1-55750-186-6.
- Busch, Rainer; Röll, Hans-Joachim (1999). Deutsche U-Boot-Verluste von September 1939 bis Mai 1945 [German U-boat losses from September 1939 to May 1945]. Der U-Boot-Krieg (in German). Vol. IV. Hamburg, Berlin, Bonn: Mittler. ISBN 3-8132-0514-2.
- Gröner, Erich; Jung, Dieter; Maass, Martin (1991). U-boats and Mine Warfare Vessels. German Warships 1815–1945. Vol. 2. Translated by Thomas, Keith; Magowan, Rachel. London: Conway Maritime Press. ISBN 0-85177-593-4.
- Kemp, Paul (1999). U-Boats Destroyed – German Submarine Losses in the World Wars. London: Arms & Armour. ISBN 1-85409-515-3.
