= German submarine U-457 =

German World War II submarine

History

Nazi Germany
- Name: U-457
- Ordered: 16 January 1940
- Builder: Deutsche Werke, Kiel
- Yard number: 288
- Laid down: 26 October 1940
- Launched: 4 October 1941
- Commissioned: 5 November 1941
- Fate: Sunk on 16 September 1942

General characteristics
- Class & type: Type VIIC submarine
- Displacement: 769 tonnes (757 long tons) surfaced; 871 t (857 long tons) submerged
- Length: 67.10 m (220 ft 2 in) o/a; 50.50 m (165 ft 8 in) pressure hull
- Beam: 6.20 m (20 ft 4 in) o/a; 4.70 m (15 ft 5 in) pressure hull
- Height: 9.60 m (31 ft 6 in)
- Draught: 4.74 m (15 ft 7 in)
- Installed power: 2,800–3,200 PS (2,100–2,400 kW; 2,800–3,200 bhp) (diesels); 750 PS (550 kW; 740 shp) (electric)
- Propulsion: 2 shafts; 2 × diesel engines; 2 × electric motors.
- Speed: 17.7 knots (32.8 km/h; 20.4 mph) surfaced; 7.6 knots (14.1 km/h; 8.7 mph) submerged
- Range: 8,500 nmi (15,700 km; 9,800 mi) at 10 knots (19 km/h; 12 mph) surfaced; 80 nmi (150 km; 92 mi) at 4 knots (7.4 km/h; 4.6 mph) submerged
- Test depth: 230 m (750 ft); Crush depth: 250–295 m (820–968 ft)
- Complement: 4 officers, 40–56 enlisted
- Armament: 5 × 53.3 cm (21 in) torpedo tubes (four bow, one stern); 14 × torpedoes; 1 × 8.8 cm (3.46 in) deck gun (220 rounds); 1 x 2 cm (0.79 in) C/30 AA gun

Service record
- Part of: 6th U-boat Flotilla; 5 November 1941 – 30 June 1942; 11th U-boat Flotilla; 1 July – 16 September 1942
- Identification codes: M 36 700
- Commanders: K.Kapt. Karl Brandenburg; 5 November 1941 – 16 September 1942
- Operations: 3 patrols: 1st patrol: a. 28 June – 16 July 1942; b. 18 – 20 July 1942; 2nd patrol: 8 August – 7 September 1942; 3rd patrol: 10 – 16 September 1942
- Victories: 2 merchant ships sunk (15,593 GRT); 1 merchant ship damaged (8,939 GRT)

German submarine U-457 was a Type VIIC U-boat of Nazi Germany's Kriegsmarine during World War II.

She carried out three patrols, on which she sank two ships and damaged one more.

She was sunk northeast of the North Cape by a British warship on 16 September 1942.

== Design ==
German Type VIIC submarines were preceded by the shorter Type VIIB submarines. U-457 had a displacement of 769 tonnes (757 long tons) when at the surface and 871 tonnes (857 long tons) while submerged. She had a total length of 67.10 m (220 ft 2 in), a pressure hull length of 50.50 m (165 ft 8 in), a beam of 6.20 m (20 ft 4 in), a height of 9.60 m (31 ft 6 in), and a draught of 4.74 m (15 ft 7 in). The submarine was powered by two Germaniawerft F46 four-stroke, six-cylinder supercharged diesel engines producing a total of 2,800 to 3,200 metric horsepower (2,060 to 2,350 kW; 2,760 to 3,160 shp) for use while surfaced, two Siemens-Schuckert GU 343/38–8 double-acting electric motors producing a total of 750 metric horsepower (550 kW; 740 shp) for use while submerged. She had two shafts and two 1.23 m (4 ft) propellers. The boat was capable of operating at depths of up to 230 metres (750 ft).

The submarine had a maximum surface speed of 17.7 knots (32.8 km/h; 20.4 mph) and a maximum submerged speed of 7.6 knots (14.1 km/h; 8.7 mph). When submerged, the boat could operate for 80 nautical miles (150 km; 92 mi) at 4 knots (7.4 km/h; 4.6 mph); when surfaced, she could travel 8,500 nautical miles (15,700 km; 9,800 mi) at 10 knots (19 km/h; 12 mph). U-457 was fitted with five 53.3 cm (21 in) torpedo tubes (four fitted at the bow and one at the stern), fourteen torpedoes, one 8.8 cm (3.46 in) SK C/35 naval gun, 220 rounds, and a 2 cm (0.79 in) C/30 anti-aircraft gun. The boat had a complement of between forty-four and sixty.

== Service history ==
The submarine was laid down on 26 October 1940 in the Deutsche Werke, Kiel as yard number 288, launched on 4 October 1941 and commissioned on 5 November under the command of Korvettenkapitän Karl Brandenburg.

She served with the 6th U-boat Flotilla from 5 November 1941 for training and the 11th flotilla from 1 July 1942 for operations.

=== First patrol ===
U-457's first patrol was preceded by two short journeys from Kiel to Trondheim in Norway. The patrol itself commenced with her departure from Trondheim on 28 June 1942.

She sank the Christopher Newport 35 nautical miles (65 km; 40 mi) east of Bear Island on 4 July. The ship, from the ill-fated convoy PQ 17, had already been hit by an aerial torpedo in the Barents Sea. A 'coup de grace' torpedo from the British submarine P-614 failed to sink the ship; but one from U-457 succeeded.

The boat then went on to sink the RFA Aldersdale on 7 July 1942; after the merchantman, also a member of PQ 17, had been bombed. U-457 came across the abandoned tanker and after firing 75 rounds from her deck gun, finished the wreck off with a single torpedo.

=== Second patrol ===
Her second foray was relatively uneventful – starting in Narvik on 8 August 1942 and finishing in Trondheim on 7 September.

=== Third patrol and loss ===
The submarine damaged the Atheltemplar of the Convoy PQ 18 on 14 September 1942 south of Spitsbergen (Svalbard). U-457 was sunk on the 16th by depth charges from the British destroyer HMS Impulsive.

Forty-five men died in U-457; there were no survivors.

=== Wolfpacks ===
U-457 took part in two wolfpacks, namely:

- Eisteufel (30 June – 12 July 1942)
- Trägertod (12 – 16 September 1942)

== Summary of raiding history ==
Date	Ship Name	Nationality	Tonnage (Note: Merchant ship tonnages are in gross register tons. Military vessels are listed by tons displacement.)	Fate
4 July 1942	Christopher Newport	United States	7,191	Sunk
7 July 1942	RFA Aldersdale	Royal Fleet Auxiliary	8,402	Sunk
14 September 1942	Atheltemplar	United Kingdom	8,939	Damaged

== Bibliography ==
- Blair, Clay (2000) [1998]. Hitler's U-Boat War: The Hunted 1942–1945. Vol. 2. ISBN 0-304-35261-6.
- Busch, Rainer; Röll, Hans-Joachim (1999). German U-boat commanders of World War II : a biographical dictionary. Translated by Brooks, Geoffrey. London, Annapolis, Md: Greenhill Books, Naval Institute Press. ISBN 1-55750-186-6.
- Busch, Rainer; Röll, Hans-Joachim (1999). Deutsche U-Boot-Verluste von September 1939 bis Mai 1945 [German U-boat losses from September 1939 to May 1945]. Der U-Boot-Krieg (in German). Vol. IV. Hamburg, Berlin, Bonn: Mittler. ISBN 3-8132-0514-2.
- Gröner, Erich; Jung, Dieter; Maass, Martin (1991). U-boats and Mine Warfare Vessels. German Warships 1815–1945. Vol. 2. Translated by Thomas, Keith; Magowan, Rachel. London: Conway Maritime Press. ISBN 0-85177-593-4.
- Kemp, Paul (1999). U-Boats Destroyed – German Submarine Losses in the World Wars. London: Arms & Armour. ISBN 1-85409-515-3.
