= HMS Windsor (D42) =

Destroyer of the Royal Navy

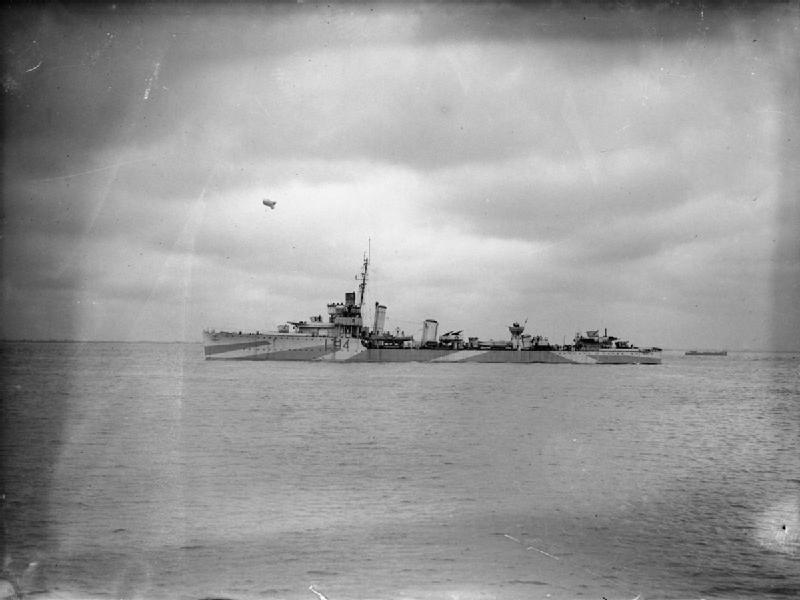
- HMS Windsor underway in coastal waters during World War II.

History

United Kingdom
- Name: HMS Windsor
- Ordered: 9 December 1916
- Builder: Scotts Shipbuilding and Engineering Company, Greenock
- Laid down: April 1917
- Launched: 21 June 1918
- Completed: 28 August 1918
- Commissioned: 28 August 1918
- Decommissioned: summer 1945
- Identification: Pennant number: F12 (September 1918); D42 (interwar); I42 (June 1940)
- Motto: Stat fortuna domus ("May the fortune of the House stand")
- Honours and awards: Battle honours for: Cartagena 1741 (carried forward from the first HMS Windsor); Finisterre I 1747 (carried forward from the first HMS Windsor); Finisterre II 1747 (carried forward from the first HMS Windsor); Atlantic 1939–1940; Dunkirk 1940; Arctic 1942; English Channel 1942–1943; North Sea 1942–1945; Normandy 1944
- Fate: Sold 4 March 1947 for scrapping
- Badge: A silver castle surmounted by the Royal Crown Proiper on a red field

General characteristics
- Displacement: 1,100 tons
- Length: 300 ft (91 m) o/a, 312 ft (95 m)p/p
- Beam: 26.75 ft (8.15 m)
- Draught: 9 ft (2.7 m) standard, 11.25 ft (3.43 m) in deep
- Propulsion: 3 Yarrow type Water-tube boilers; Brown-Curtis steam turbines; 2 shafts; 27,000 shp (20,000 kW)
- Speed: 34 knots (63 km/h; 39 mph)
- Range: 320–370 tons oil, 3,500 nmi (6,500 km) at 15 knots (28 km/h; 17 mph), 900 nmi (1,700 km) at 32 knots (59 km/h; 37 mph)
- Complement: 110
- Armament: 4 × QF 4 in Mk.V (102mm L/45), mount P Mk.I; 2 × QF 2 pdr Mk.II "pom-pom" (40 mm L/39) or; 1 × QF 3 inch 20 cwt (76 mm), mount HA Mk.II; 6 (2x3) tubes for 21 inch (533 mm) torpedoes; twin QF 6 pounder 10 cwt gun (1942 – replaced ‘A’ gun)

The third HMS Windsor (D42) was a W-class destroyer of the British Royal Navy that saw service in the final months of World War I and in World War II.

== Construction and commissioning ==
Windsor was ordered on 9 December 1916, and was laid down by Scotts Shipbuilding and Engineering Company at Greenock, Scotland, in April 1917. Launched on 21 June 1918, she was completed on 28 August 1918 and commissioned the same day. She was assigned the pennant number F12 in September 1918; it was changed to D42 during the interwar period.

== Service history ==
=== World War I ===
Upon completion, Windsor was assigned to the Grand Fleet, based at Scapa Flow in the Orkney Islands, in which she served for the rest of World War I. She was present at the surrender of the Imperial German Navy's High Seas Fleet in November 1918.

=== Interwar ===
Upon the signing of the Armistice, HMS Windsor was assigned to the Baltic Sea where it participated in the British campaign in the Baltic (1918–1919). Among the ship's operations included providing naval, training, and logistical support for Latvian troops fighting in the Latvian War of Independence. Later, Windsor was assigned to the 6th Destroyer Flotilla in the Atlantic Fleet in 1921. In 1928, she was part of the Portsmouth Local Flotilla.

=== World War II ===
==== 1939–1940 ====
On the day the United Kingdom entered World War II, 3 September 1939, Windsor was assigned to the 18th Destroyer Flotilla at Portland, England, for convoy escort and patrol duty in the English Channel and Southwestern Approaches. In October 1939 she transferred to Western Approaches Command but continued her assignment in the Southwestern Approaches. By January 1940, she was based at Plymouth for these duties. On 11 March 1940, she and the destroyer HMS Winchelsea relieved two French warships as the escort of Convoy HG 21, as it arrived in the Southwestern Approaches from Gibraltar, and escorted the convoy until the conclusion of its voyage at Liverpool on 13 March 1940.

In May 1940, Windsor transferred to the 19th Destroyer Flotilla at Dover and was assigned to the support of military operations opposing the highly successful German offensive into France, Belgium, the Netherlands, and Luxembourg that began that month. On the evening of 13 May 1940, she evacuated the Government of the Netherlands from the Hook of Holland. On 23 May 1940, she and the destroyer HMS Venetia patrolled off Boulogne, France, and engaged troops and tanks of the German Army's 2nd Panzer Division that were attacking the port; Windsor entered the port that evening and evacuated British troops trapped there by the German advance.

On 26 May 1940, Windsor was assigned to Operation Dynamo, the evacuation of Allied troops from Dunkirk, France. She began support operations on 27 May 1940, patrolling off the Dunkirk beachhead and escorting ships engaged in evacuating personnel from it. That day she came to the assistance of the passenger ship Mona's Isle, which had come under German air attack with 1,000 troops from Dunkirk on board, suffering 23 dead and 60 wounded; after rendering medical assistance to Mona's Isle, then Windsor escorted her to Dover. On 28 May, Windsor herself came under a heavy and sustained attack by 15 German aircraft, which bombed and strafed her, inflicting 30 casualties on her crew and causing significant damage, forcing her to return to Dover. Despite her damage, however, she remained in action, evacuating 606 troops from Dunkirk on 30 May 658 troops on one trip and 588 troops on a second trip on 31 May 493 troops on 1 June, and 644 troops in two voyages on 2 June. She made her final evacuation trip on 3 June, transporting 1,022 troops and bringing to 3,991 the number of troops she had evacuated from Dunkirk.

Windsor proceeded to Liverpool on 4 June 1940 for repairs and a refit, and her pennant number was changed to I42. After the completion of repairs, she and the destroyer HMS Vesper on 1 July 1940 rescued 111 survivors of the British merchant ship Beignon, which the German submarine U-30 had torpedoed and sunk in the North Atlantic Ocean 300 nm west of Ushant at 47°20′00″N 010°30′00″W.

Later in July 1940, Windsor was assigned along with the destroyer leader HMS Montrose and the destroyers HMS Walpole, and HMS Whitshed to the 16th Destroyer Flotilla at Harwich for convoy escort and patrol duty in the North Sea. On 28 October 1940, Windsor towed Walpole to Sheerness after Walpole detonated a magnetic mine and became disabled. On 8 December 1940, Windsor herself struck a naval mine off Aldeburgh, Suffolk, and she entered Chatham Dockyard for repairs.

==== 1941–1942 ====
Windsor's repairs were completed on 24 April 1941. In May 1941, she detached from her North Sea duties for service with the Home Fleet at Scapa Flow in the Orkney Islands. During her time with the Home Fleet, she escorted major warships during exercises in the Northwestern Approaches; on 17 May 1941, she and Walpole escorted the battleship HMS King George V during a gunnery exercise.

Windsor returned to the 16th Destroyer Flotilla at Harwich in July 1941 and resumed her North Sea convoy and patrol duties. By January 1942, these duties had begun to include operations to intercept German motor torpedo boats – S-boats, known to the Allies as "E-boats" – in the North Sea before they could mount attacks against Allied ships. On 13 March 1942, she, Walpole, and the escort destroyers HMS Blencathra, HMS Calpe, and HMS Fernie deployed in the English Channel to intercept the German merchant raider Michel during Michel's voyage – under escort by five torpedo boats and nine minesweepers – from Flushing in the Netherlands to German-occupied France; Windsor exchanged gunfire with the German ships on 14 March and made a torpedo attack against them, sustaining superficial damage from the German gunfire. She then returned to convoy and patrol duty in the North Sea and English Channel.

In August 1942, Windsor, Montrose, Walpole, and the destroyer HMS Worcester detached for duty with the Home Fleet at Scapa Flow and deployed in the Northwestern Approaches to escort major warships of the Home Fleet and conduct antisubmarine patrols. In September 1942, Windsor was assigned to support the passage of the Arctic convoys PQ 18 and QP 14 during their voyages to and from the Soviet Union, respectively. On 8 September 1942, she joined the escort of PQ 18, but on 9 September she detached from the convoy to form Force P, consisting of Windsor, the escort destroyers HMS Cowdray and HMS Oakley, and the Royal Fleet Auxiliary tankers RFA Blue Ranger (A157) and RFA Oligarch. Force P proceeded to Lowe Sound at Spitsbergen to establish a refuelling base. Windsor operated as a guard ship there from 12 September until 21 September 1942, when refuelling operations were complete and she departed for Iceland. On 26 September, she departed Iceland to return to her North Sea convoy and patrol duties with the 16th Destroyer Flotilla.

After spending the autumn of 1942 in North Sea operations, Windsor again detached in December 1942 for a tour of duty with the Home Fleet at Scapa Flow.

During 1942, the Urban District of Windsor in Berkshire "adopted" Windsor as the result of a Warship Week National Savings campaign.

==== 1943–1945 ====
In January 1943, Windsor continued her deployment with the Home Fleet, operating in the Northwestern Approaches. Later in the month, she returned to her North Sea duties with the 16th Destroyer Flotilla, and on 24 January 1943 she and the escort destroyer HMS Mendip drove off a German E-boat attack against a convoy they were escorting in the North Sea. On 4 March 1943, Windsor, the escort destroyer HMS Southdown, and the corvette HMS Sheldrake fought an action against E-boats off Great Yarmouth. Windsor joined Blencathra and the motor gunboats MGB 321 and MGB 333 in driving off an attack by E-boats against Convoy FS 1074 off Smith's Knoll on 28 March 1943.

Windsor continued her escort and patrol operations in the North Sea until May 1944, when the Royal Navy assigned her to support of the upcoming Allied invasion of Normandy, scheduled for early June 1944. Accordingly, she joined the corvette HMS Starwort and two motor launches of the Royal Navy Coastal Forces off Southend in early June 1944 to form Escort Group 132, assigned to escort Convoy ETC2Y, which consisted of 13 coasters carrying pre-loaded British transports as well as five water tankers and 10 oil tankers. On 4 June 1944, the convoy and its escorts moved from the Thames Estuary to the Solent, where the corvette HMS Buttercup and a motor minesweeper joined the escort. The invasion was postponed from 5 to 6 June 1944 due to bad weather, but on 7 June, the day after the initial landings, the convoy arrived off the invasion beaches to discharge its cargo, then returned to the Nore later in the day to begin a convoying cycle supporting the build-up of Allied forces and supplies in Normandy. From 8 June until later in the month, Windsor escorted convoys between England and the beachhead.

In July 1944, Windsor returned to patrol and escort duty in the North Sea, which she continued until the surrender of Germany in early May 1945.

== Decommissioning and disposal ==
During the summer of 1945, Windsor was decommissioned, transferred to the Reserve Fleet, and placed in reserve, no longer being listed on the Royal Navy's active list by July 1945. After the surrender of Japan on 15 August 1945, Windsor was placed on the disposal list. She was sold on 4 March 1947 to Metal Industries for scrapping, arrived under tow at the shipbreaker's yard in Charlestown, Fife, Scotland, in May 1949, and was scrapped in June 1949.

== Bibliography ==
- Campbell, John (1985). Naval Weapons of World War II. Annapolis, Maryland: Naval Institute Press. ISBN 0-87021-459-4.
- Chesneau, Roger, ed. (1980). Conway's All the World's Fighting Ships 1922–1946. Greenwich, UK: Conway Maritime Press. ISBN 0-85177-146-7.
- Colledge, J. J.; Warlow, Ben (2006) [1969]. Ships of the Royal Navy: The Complete Record of All Fighting Ships of the Royal Navy from the 15th Century to the Present (3rd Rev ed.). London: Chatham Publishing. ISBN 978-1-86176-281-8. OCLC 67375475.
- Cocker, Maurice. Destroyers of the Royal Navy, 1893–1981. Ian Allan. ISBN 0-7110-1075-7.
- Friedman, Norman (2009). British Destroyers From Earliest Days to the Second World War. Annapolis, Maryland: Naval Institute Press. ISBN 978-1-59114-081-8.
- Gardiner, Robert & Gray, Randal, eds. (1985). Conway's All the World's Fighting Ships 1906–1921. Annapolis, Maryland: Naval Institute Press. ISBN 0-85177-245-5.
- Lenton, H. T. (1998). British & Empire Warships of the Second World War. Annapolis, Maryland: Naval Institute Press. ISBN 1-55750-048-7.
- March, Edgar J. (1966). British Destroyers: A History of Development, 1892–1953; Drawn by Admiralty Permission From Official Records & Returns, Ships' Covers & Building Plans. London: Seeley Service. OCLC 164893555.
- Preston, Antony (1971). 'V & W' Class Destroyers 1917–1945. London: Macdonald. OCLC 464542895.
- Raven, Alan & Roberts, John (1979). 'V' and 'W' Class Destroyers. Man o'War. Vol. 2. London: Arms & Armour. ISBN 0-85368-233-X.
- Rohwer, Jürgen (2005). Chronology of the War at Sea 1939–1945: The Naval History of World War Two (Third Revised ed.). Annapolis, Maryland: Naval Institute Press. ISBN 1-59114-119-2.
- Whinney, Bob (2000). The U-boat Peril: A Fight for Survival. Cassell. ISBN 0-304-35132-6.
- Whitley, M. J. (1988). Destroyers of World War 2. Annapolis, Maryland: Naval Institute Press. ISBN 0-87021-326-1.
- Winser, John de D. (1999). B.E.F. Ships Before, At and After Dunkirk. Gravesend, Kent: World Ship Society. ISBN 0-905617-91-6.
