= Convoy QP 14 =

WWII Allied naval convoy

- Part of The Arctic convoys of the Second World War
- German occupied Norway (in green) lay along the flank of the sea route to northern Russia
| Date | 13–26 September 1942 |
| Location | Arctic Ocean |

Belligerents
| Germany | United Kingdom |

Commanders and leaders
| Karl Dönitz | John Dowding |

Strength
| 7 U-boats | 17 merchant ships; 65 escorts |

Casualties and losses
| 1 U-boat sunk; 5 damaged | 3 merchant ships sunk; 2 warships sunk |

Convoy QP 14 (13–26 September 1942) was an Arctic convoy of the QP series which ran during the Second World War. The convoy was a return journey of Allied ships from the port of Arkhangelsk in the Soviet Union to Loch Ewe in the west of Scotland. The British planned to send Convoy PQ 18 from Iceland to Murmansk and when the convoys crossed transfer much of the escort force from the outbound convoy to Convoy QP 14 and escort back it through the most dangerous waters off Norway.

Rather than provide a covering force of cruisers and a distant covering force of battleships and aircraft carriers as hitherto, a large Fighting Destroyer Escort was formed to accompany Convoy PQ 18 and be capable of independently operating, to present an attack by German ships with the risk of massed torpedo salvoes. To keep the larger number of escorts fuelled, Force P of fuel tankers with escorts were sent to Svalbard and fleet oilers joined Convoy PQ 18; on 16 September, much of the Convoy PQ 18 escort force and oilers transferred to Convoy QP 14 as the convoys crossed.

There was a scare on 19 September that German ships were attacking, but this was a false alarm, and the convoy was opposed only by aircraft and submarines. The German attacks sank three merchant ships and two of the escorts for the loss of a U-boat and five damaged, the aircraft on the escort carrier HMS Avenger doing much to deter U-boat attacks, assisted by land-based aircraft from 23 September. The convoy reached Loch Ewe in Scotland on 26 September.

Operation EV, the escort operation for Convoy QP 14 and Convoy PQ 18, was judged a success by its commander, Rear-Admiral Robert Burnett. He noted that the risks had been great and had re-fuelling not being achieved due to bad weather or if there had been better co-ordination between U-boats and Luftwaffe aircraft, there could have been another disaster like Convoy PQ 17. Burnett was criticised by Stephen Roskill, the official historian, for sending Avenger back to base on 20 September; weather grounded the land-based aircraft and three ships were sunk on 22 September but in 2004, Richard Woodman wrote that the risks to Convoy QP 14 had been justified.

== Background ==
=== Arctic Ocean ===
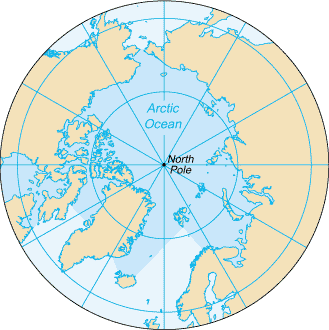
Diagram of the Arctic Ocean

Between Greenland and Norway are some of the most stormy waters of the world's oceans, 890 mi (1,440 km) of water under gales full of snow, sleet and hail. Around the North Cape and the Barents Sea the sea temperature rarely rises about 4° Celsius and a man in the water will probably die unless rescued immediately. The cold water and air makes spray freeze on the superstructure of ships, which has quickly to be removed to avoid the ship becoming top-heavy. The cold Arctic water is met by the Gulf Stream, a flow of warm water from the Gulf of Mexico, which becomes the North Atlantic Drift further north. Arriving at the south-west of England the drift moves between Scotland and Iceland. North of Norway the drift splits.

The northern stream of the drift goes north of Bear Island to Svalbard and the southern stream follows the coast of Murmansk into the Barents Sea. The mingling of cold Arctic water and warmer water of higher salinity generates thick banks of fog for convoys to hide. The waters drastically reduced the effectiveness of Asdic as U-boats moved in waters of differing temperatures and density. In winter, polar ice can form as far south as 50 mi (80 km) off the North Cape, forcing ships closer to Luftwaffe air bases and in summer it can recede to Svalbard, allowing ships to sail further out to sea. The area is in perpetual darkness in winter and permanent daylight in the summer which makes visual air reconnaissance almost impossible or easy.

=== Arctic convoys ===
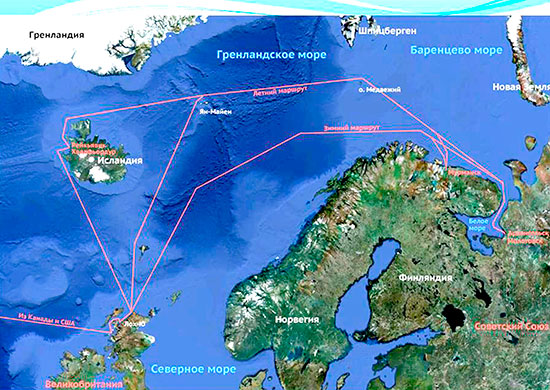
Russian map of Arctic convoy routes

In October 1941, after Operation Barbarossa, the German invasion of the USSR, which had begun on 22 June, the Prime Minister, Winston Churchill, made a commitment to send a convoy to the Arctic ports of the USSR every ten days and to deliver 1,200 tanks a month from July 1942 to January 1943, followed by 2,000 tanks and another 3,600 aircraft more than already promised. (Note: In October 1941, the unloading capacity of Arkhangelsk was 300,000 long tons (300,000 t), Vladivostok 140,000 long tons (140,000 t) and 60,000 long tons (61,000 t) in the Persian Gulf ports.)The first convoy was due at Murmansk around 12 October and the next convoy was to depart Iceland on 22 October. A motley of British, Allied and neutral shipping loaded with military stores and raw materials for the Soviet war effort would be assembled at Hvalfjordur (Hvalfiord) in Iceland, convenient for ships from both sides of the Atlantic.

By late 1941, the convoy system used in the Atlantic had been established on the Arctic run; a convoy commodore ensured that the ships' masters and signals officers attended a briefing before sailing to make arrangements for the management of the convoy, which sailed in a formation of long rows of short columns. The commodore was usually a retired naval officer, aboard a ship identified by a white pendant with a blue cross. The commodore was assisted by a Naval signals party of four men, who used lamps, semaphore flags and telescopes to pass signals, coded from books carried in a bag, weighted to be dumped overboard. In large convoys, the commodore was assisted by vice- and rear-commodores who directed the speed, course and zig-zagging of the merchant ships and liaised with the escort commander. (Note: By the end of 1941, 187 Matilda II and 249 Valentine tanks had been delivered, comprising 25 per cent of the medium-heavy tanks in the Red Army, making 30–40 per cent of the medium-heavy tanks defending Moscow. In December 1941, 16 per cent of the fighters defending Moscow were Hawker Hurricanes and Curtiss Tomahawks from Britain and by 1 January 1942, 96 Hurricane fighters were flying in the Soviet Air Forces (Voyenno-Vozdushnye Sily, VVS). The British supplied radar apparatus, machine tools, Asdic and commodities.)

Following Convoy PQ 16 and the disaster to Convoy PQ 17 in July 1942, Arctic convoys were postponed for nine weeks and much of the Home Fleet was detached to the Mediterranean for Operation Pedestal, a Malta convoy. During the lull, Admiral John Tovey concluded that the Home Fleet had been of no great protection to convoys beyond Bear Island, midway between Spitsbergen and the North Cape. Tovey would oversee the operation from Scapa Flow, where the fleet was linked to the Admiralty by landline, immune to variations in wireless reception. The next convoy should be accompanied by sufficient protection against surface attack; the longer-range destroyers of the Home Fleet could be used to augment the close escort force of anti-submarine and anti-aircraft ships, to confront a sortie by German ships with the threat of a massed destroyer torpedo attack. The practice of meeting homeward-bound QP convoys near Bear Island was dispensed with and Convoy QP 14 was to wait until Convoy PQ 18 was near its destination, despite the longer journey being more demanding of crews, fuel and equipment. The new escort carrier HMS Avenger (Commander Anthony Colthurst) had arrived from the United States and was added to the escort force, to give the convoy air cover.

=== Signals intelligence ===
==== Bletchley Park ====
The British Government Code and Cypher School (GC&CS) based at Bletchley Park housed a small industry of code-breakers and traffic analysts. By June 1941, the German Enigma machine Home Waters (Heimish) settings used by surface ships and U-boats could quickly be read. On 1 February 1942, the Enigma machines used in U-boats in the Atlantic and Mediterranean were changed but German ships and the U-boats in Arctic waters continued with the older Heimish (Hydra from 1942, Dolphin to the British) settings. By mid-1941, British Y-stations were able to receive and read Luftwaffe W/T transmissions and give advance warning of Luftwaffe operations. In 1941, naval Headache personnel with receivers to eavesdrop on Luftwaffe wireless transmissions were embarked on warships and from May 1942, ships gained RAF Y computor parties, which sailed with cruiser admirals in command of convoy escorts, to interpret Luftwaffe W/T signals intercepted by the Headaches. The Admiralty sent details of Luftwaffe wireless frequencies, call signs and the daily local codes to the computors, which combined with their knowledge of Luftwaffe procedures, could glean fairly accurate details of German reconnaissance sorties. Sometimes computors predicted attacks twenty minutes before they were detected by radar.

==== B-Dienst ====
The rival German Beobachtungsdienst (B-Dienst, Observation Service) of the Kriegsmarine Marinenachrichtendienst (MND, Naval Intelligence Service) had broken several Admiralty codes and cyphers by 1939, which were used to help Kriegsmarine ships elude British forces and provide opportunities for surprise attacks. From June to August 1940, six British submarines were sunk in the Skaggerak using information gleaned from British wireless signals. In 1941, B-Dienst read signals from the Commander in Chief Western Approaches informing convoys of areas patrolled by U-boats, enabling the submarines to move into "safe" zones. B-Dienst broke Naval Cypher No 3 (the convoy cypher) in February 1942 and by March was reading up to 80 per cent of the traffic, which continued until 15 December 1943. By coincidence, the British lost access to the Shark cypher and had no information to send in Cypher No 3 which might compromise Ultra. In early September, Finnish Radio Intelligence deciphered a Soviet Air Force transmission which divulged the convoy itinerary, which was forwarded it to the Germans.

== Prelude ==
=== Luftflotte 5 ===
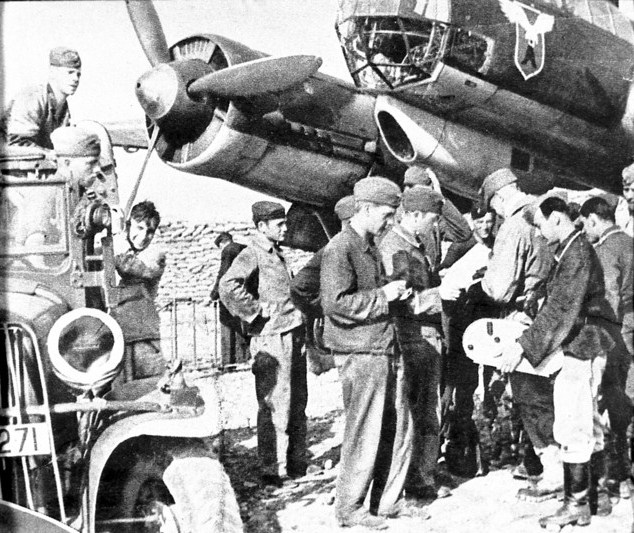
Junkers Ju 88 D-2 of 1. Staffel der Fernaufklärungsgruppe 124 (1.(F)/124, 1st Squadron of Long-Range Reconnaissance Wing 124), presumably in Kirkenes/Northern Norway, 1942. A film cassette is being handed over to the photo development and evaluation centre.

In March 1942, Adolf Hitler issued a directive for a greater anti-convoy effort to weaken the Red Army and prevent Allied troops being transferred to northern Russia, preparatory to a landing on the coast of northern Norway. Luftflotte 5 (Generaloberst Hans-Jürgen Stumpff) was to be reinforced and the Kriegsmarine was ordered to put an end to Arctic convoys and naval incursions. The Luftwaffe and Kriegsmarine were to work together with a simplified command structure, which was implemented after a conference; the Navy had preferred joint command but the Luftwaffe insisted on the exchange of liaison officers. Luftflotte 5 was to be reinforced by 2./Kampfgeschwader 30 (KG 30) and KG 30 was to increase its readiness for operations. A squadron of Aufklärungsflieger Gruppe 125 (Aufkl.Fl.Gr. 125) was transferred to Norway and more long-range Focke-Wulf Fw 200 Kondor patrol aircraft from Kampfgeschwader 40 (KG 40) were sent from France. At the end of March, the air fleet was divided.

Fliegerführer Nord (Ost) [Oberst Alexander Holle], the largest command, was based at Kirkenes with 2./JG 5, 10.(Z)/JG 5, 1./StG 5 (Dive Bomber Wing 5) and 1.Fernaufklärungsgruppe 124 [1./(F) 124] (1 Squadron, Long Range Reconnaissance Wing 124) charged with attacks on Murmansk and Arkhangelsk as well as attacks on convoys. Part of Fliegerführer Nord (Ost) was based at Petsamo (5./JG 5, 6./JG 5 and 3./Kampfgeschwader 26 (3./KG 26), Banak (2./KG 30, 3./KG 30 and 1./(F) 22) and Billefjord (1./Kü.Fl.Gr. 125). Fliegerführer Lofoten (Oberst Hans Roth) was based at Bardufoss but had no permanently attached units, which were added according to events. At the start of the anti-shipping campaign only the coastal patrol squadrons 3./Küstenfliegergruppe 906 at Trondheim and 1./1./Kü.Fl.Gr. 123 at Tromsø were attached to Fliegerführer Lofoten. Fliegerführer Nord (West) was based at Sola and was responsible for the early detection of convoys and attacks south of a line from Trondheim westwards to Shetland and Iceland, with 1./(F) 22, the Kondors of 1./KG 40, short-range coastal reconnaissance squadrons 1./Küstenfliegergruppe 406 (1./Kü.Fl.Gr. 406), 2./ Küstenfliegergruppe 406 (2./Kü.Fl.Gr. 406) and a weather reconnaissance squadron.

=== Luftwaffe tactics ===
As soon as information was received about the assembly of a convoy, Fliegerführer Nord (West) would send long-range reconnaissance aircraft to search Iceland and northern Scotland. Once a convoy was spotted aircraft were to keep contact as far as possible in the extreme weather of the area. If contact was lost its course at the last sighting would be extrapolated and overlapping sorties would be flown to regain contact. All three Fliegerführer were to co-operate as the convoy moved through their operational areas. Fliegerführer Lofoten would begin the anti-convoy operation east to a line from the North Cape to Spitzbergen Island, whence Fliegerführer Nord (Ost) would take over using his and Fliegerführer Lofoten's aircraft, which would to Kirkenes or Petsamo to stay in range. Fliegerführer Nord (Ost) was not allowed to divert aircraft to ground support during the operation. As soon as the convoy came into range, the aircraft were to keep up a continuous attack until the convoy docked at Murmansk or Arkhangelsk. From late March to late May the air effort against Convoy PQ 13, Convoy PQ 14, Convoy PQ 15 and Convoy QP 9, Convoy QP 10 and Convoy QP 11 had little effect, twelve sinkings out of 16 lost in PQ convoys and two out of five sinkings from QP convoys being credited to the Luftwaffe; 166 merchant ships had sailed for Russia and 145 had survived the journey.

Bad weather had been nearly as dangerous as the Luftwaffe, forcing 16 of the ships in Convoy PQ 14 to turn back. In April, the spring thaw grounded many Luftwaffe aircraft and in May bad weather led to contact being lost and convoys scattering, being impossible to find in the long Arctic night. When air attacks on convoys had taken place, the formations rarely amounted to more than twelve aircraft, greatly simplifying the task of convoy anti-aircraft gunners, who shot down several aircraft in April and May. Failings in liaison between the Luftwaffe and Kriegsmarine were uncovered and tactical co-operation greatly enhanced, Hermann Böhm (Kommandierender Admiral Norwegen) noting that in the operation against Convoy PQ 15 and Convoy QP 11, there were no problems in co-operation between aircraft, submarines and destroyers. From 152 aircraft in January, reinforcements to Luftflotte 5 increased its strength to 221 front-line aircraft by March 1942. By May Luftflotte 5 had 264 aircraft based around the North Cape in northern Norway, consisting of 108 Ju 88 long-range bombers, 42 Heinkel 111 torpedo-bombers, 15 Heinkel He 115 float-plane torpedo-bombers, 30 Junkers Ju 87 dive-bombers and 74 long range Focke Wulf 200s, Junkers 88s and Blohm & Voss BV 138s.

==== Goldene Zange (Golden Comb) ====
The Luftwaffe had used the lull after Convoy PQ 17 to assemble a force of 35 Junkers Ju 88 A-4 dive-bombers of KG 30 and 42 torpedo-bombers of KG 26 (I/KG 26 with 28 Heinkel He 111 H-6s and III/KG 26 with 14 Ju 88 A-4s) to join the reconnaissance aircraft of Luftflotte 5. After analysing the results of anti-shipping operations against Convoy PQ 17, in which the crews of Luftflotte 5 made exaggerated claims of ships sunk, including a cruiser, the anti-shipping units devised the Goldene Zange (Golden Comb). Ju 88 bombers were to divert the defenders with medium and dive bombing attacks as the torpedo-bombers approached out of the twilight. The torpedo bombers were to fly towards the convoy in line abreast, at wave-top height to evade radar, as the convoy was silhouetted against the lighter sky, then drop their torpedoes in a salvo. When B-Dienst discovered that an aircraft carrier would accompany the next convoy, Reichsmarschall Hermann Göring gave orders that it must be sunk first; Luftwaffe aircrew were told that the destruction of the convoy was the best way to help the German army at Stalingrad and in southern Russia.

==== German air-sea rescue ====
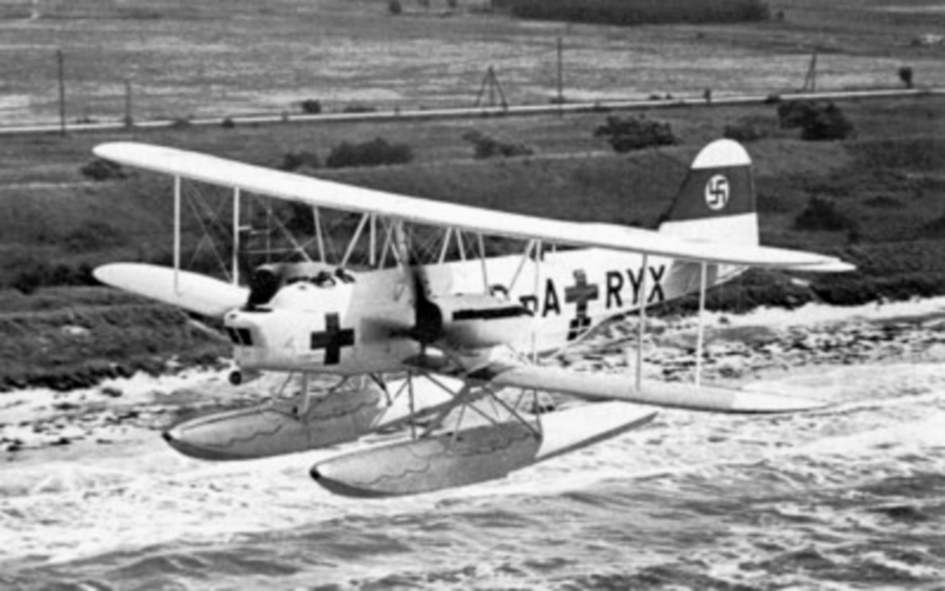
Example of a Heinkel He 59 search and rescue aircraft (1940)

The Luftwaffe Sea Rescue Service (Seenotdienst) along with the Kriegsmarine, the Norwegian Society for Sea Rescue (RS) and ships on passage, recovered aircrew and shipwrecked sailors. The service comprised Seenotbereich VIII at Stavanger covering Stavanger, Bergen and Trondheim and Seenotbereich IX at Kirkenes for Tromsø, Billefjord and Kirkenes. Co-operation was as important in rescues as it was in anti-shipping operations if people were to be saved before they succumbed to the climate and severe weather. The sea rescue aircraft comprised Heinkel He 59 floatplanes, Dornier Do 18 and Dornier Do 24 seaplanes.

Oberkommando der Luftwaffe (OKL, the high command of the Luftwaffe) was not able to increase the number of search and rescue aircraft in Norway, due to a general shortage of aircraft and crews, despite Stumpff pointing out that coming down in such cold waters required extremely swift recovery and that his crews "must be given a chance of rescue" or morale could not be maintained. After the experience of Convoy PQ 16, Stumpff gave the task to the coastal reconnaissance squadrons, whose aircraft were not usually engaged in attacks on convoys. They would henceforth stand by to rescue aircrew during anti-shipping operations.

=== Kriegsmarine ===
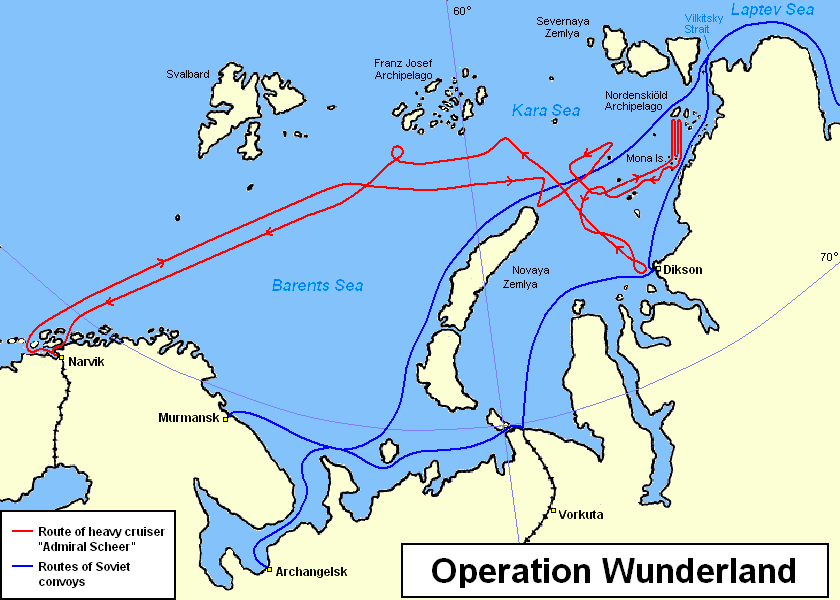
Route of Unternehmen Wunderland

Authority in the Kriegsmarine was derived from the Seekriegsleitung (SKL, Supreme Naval Command) in Berlin and Arctic operations were commanded by Admiral Boehm, the Admiral Commanding Norway, from the Marinegruppenkommando Nord (Naval Group North) HQ in Kiel. Three flag officers were detached to Oslo in command of minesweeping, coast defence, patrols and minelaying off the west, north and polar coasts. The large surface ships and U-boats were under the command of the Flag Officer Northern Waters at Narvik, who did not answer to Boehm but had authority over the Flag Officer Battlegroup, who commanded the ships when at sea. The Flag Officer Northern Waters also had tactical control of aircraft from Luftflotte 5 when they operated in support of the Kriegsmarine. The Norwegian-based aircraft had tactical headquarters at Kirkenes, Trondheim and Bardufoss. The Luftwaffe HQs were separate from the Kriegsmarine commanders except at Kirkenes, with the Flag Officer Polar Coast.

On 24 June, a British minesweeper based at Kola was sunk by Ju 87 Stuka dive-bombers and on 16 August, German cruiser Admiral Scheer conducted Operation Wunderland (Unternehmen Wunderland), a sortie against Russian ships thought to be sailing along the route north of Siberia. Admiral Scheer sailed north of Novaya Zemlya and then to the east and sank a Soviet icebreaker; by 30 August Admiral Scheer was back in Narvik. B-Dienst signals interception and documents recovered from the crashed Hampden UB-C, revealed the crossover and escort changeover points of Convoy PQ 18 and Convoy QP 14 and other details including Operation Orator. U-boats, destroyers and the minelayer Ulm sailed on Operation Zar (Unternehmen Zar) to sow mines at the entrance of the White Sea and off Novaya Zemlya. Tirpitz, the cruiser Lützow and three destroyers had been in dock for repairs since Unternehmen Rosselsprung against Convoy PQ 17 (2–5 July) and were not available. Twelve U-boats formed gruppe Trägertod in the Norwegian Sea against Convoy PQ 18 and the Kriegsmarine planned Unternehmen Doppelschlag (Operation Double Hit) in which the cruisers Admiral Scheer, Admiral Hipper and Köln with four destroyer escorts, would sail against the convoy. (Note: The Admiralty had learned from Ultra about the intended attack on Convoy PQ 18 but was unaware that the Germans also wanted to sail against Convoy QP 14 on 13 September. On the next day, having been warned by Hitler to preserve the ships for defensive use by avoiding risks in offensive operations, the sortie was cancelled.)

=== Preliminary British operations ===
After Convoy PQ 17, the supplies lost in the convoy, bound for the ships at Arkhangelsk, were replaced by the destroyers HMS Marne, Martin, Middleton and Blankney The destroyers sailed on 20 July and arrived without German interference, despite being spotted by German reconnaissance aircraft, near Jan Mayen Island. During August, Operation Orator, a Royal Air Force detachment, known as the Search & Strike Force, was sent to the USSR comprising two squadrons of Handley-Page Hampden torpedo bombers, a section of Photographic Reconnaissance Unit Spitfires and part of 210 Squadron with Catalina flying boats, to guard against sorties by German ships. The aircraft made a risky flight to the USSR, in which several Hampdens were lost; the ground crews and equipment were delivered by USS Tuscaloosa and three destroyers. (Note: A medical unit and equipment for Allied sailors was also embarked but the Soviet authorities refused permission for it to land and it had to return in Convoy QP 14.) On 25 August, during the return journey of Tuscaloosa and its escorts, Ultra revealed the itinerary of the minelayer Ulm, part of the German Operation Zar (Unternehmen Zar). Three of the destroyers were sent to intercept the ship to the south-west of Bear Island; Ulm was sunk that night and sixty survivors were taken prisoner. The Germans had to press the heavy cruiser Admiral Hipper into service as a minelayer.

== Operation EV ==
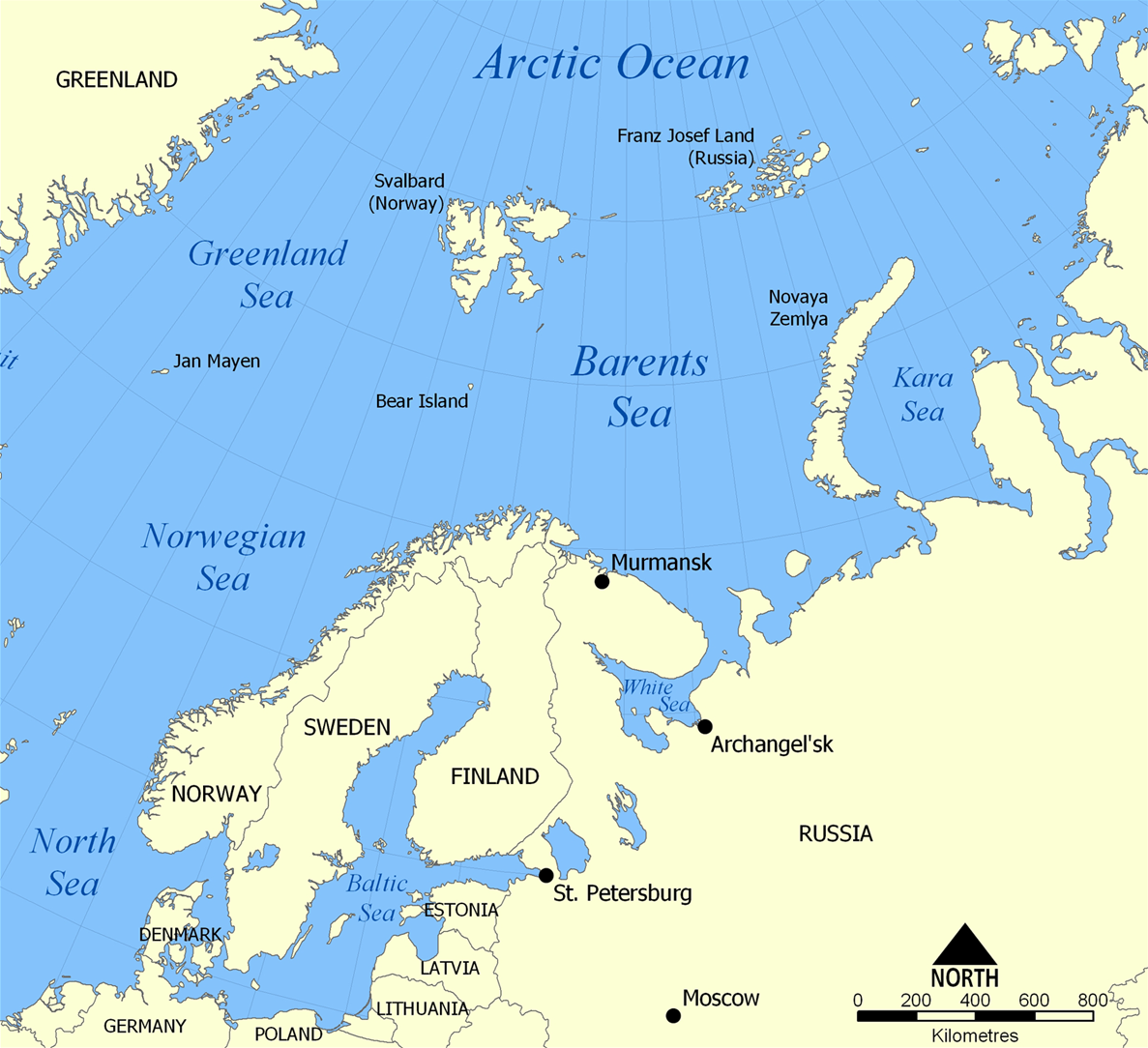
Map of the Barents Sea

Operation EV was the code-name for a naval operation to escort the northern USSR-bound Convoy PQ 18 through the Barents Sea, the area most dangerous to the convoy from air, sea and submarine attack, then to detach and join the returning Convoy QP 14. Convoy PQ 18 was to be taken over by the British and Soviet escorts from Arkhangelsk, which had escorted Convoy QP 14. Convoy PQ 18 consisted of forty merchant ships and three minesweepers to be based in Russia, along with Force Q, the Royal Fleet Auxiliary (RFA) oilers Gray Ranger and Black Ranger. A Close Escort (Commander Archibald Russell) was led by the flotilla leader HMS Malcolm with the destroyers HMS Achates and Amazon, the anti-aircraft ships Ulster Queen and Alynbank, the Flower-class corvettes Bergamot, Bluebell, Bryony and Camellia, the minesweepers Gleaner, Harrier and Sharpshooter and the submarines P. 614 and P. 615. The Carrier Force comprised Avenger with 802 Naval Air Squadron and 882 Naval Air Squadron, Fleet Air Arm (six Hawker Sea Hurricane fighters each) and 825 Naval Air Squadron (three Fairey Swordfish reconnaissance and torpedo-bombers with five crews) and the destroyers HMS Wheatland and Wilton to allow the carrier to dispatch and recover aircraft whilst sailing into the wind, independent of the convoy.

=== Fighting Destroyer Escort ===
Rather than providing a few destroyers for the escort with a cruiser force nearby, the permanent close escorts were reinforced by a Fighting Destroyer Escort (FDE) to command all of the escort forces with the convoy. Rear-Admiral Robert Burnett in the cruiser HMS Scylla the commander of the FDE had sixteen fleet destroyers disposed in Force A [Captain (D) H. T. Armstrong] in HMS Onslow with Onslaught, HMS Opportune, Offa, Ashanti, Eskimo, Somali, Tartar and Force B [Captain (D) I. M. R. Campbell] in HMS Milne with Marne, Martin, Meteor, Faulknor, Fury, Impulsive and Intrepid. (Burnett ["Bullshit Bob"] had tried to explain the reason for the scattering of Convoy PQ 17 when the destroyers had returned to Scapa Flow but his address fell flat.) Before Convoy PQ 18 sailed, the FDE was visited by Churchill to try to restore morale. The summer melt of the polar ice cap reached its most northerly extent in September and the convoys could sail north of Bear Island, considerably lengthening the journey. To conserve fuel, destroyer attacks on U-boats were to be limited to 90 minutes' duration.

=== Other ships ===
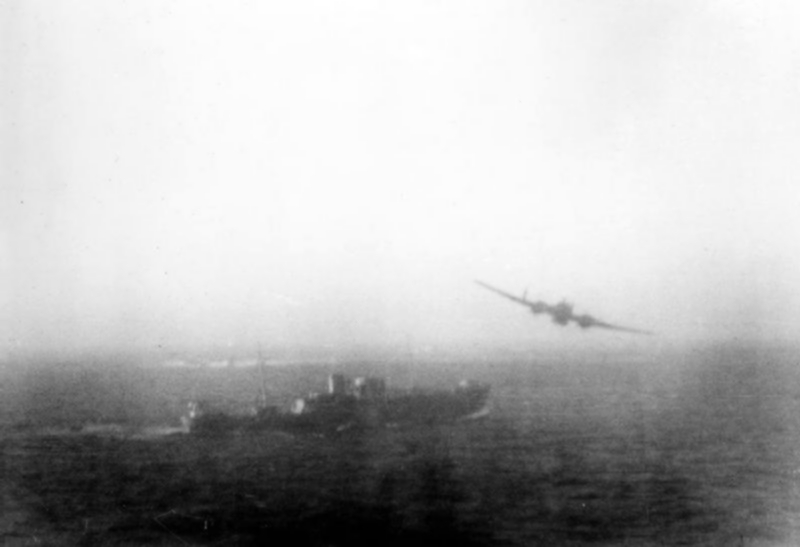
A Hampden TB Mark I over a German ship off Egero, Norway (29 January 1943).

The Spitzbergen Fuelling Force (Force P), departing ahead of Convoy PQ 18 on 3 September, was made up of the oilers RFA Blue Ranger and Oligarch with the destroyers HMS Cowdray, Oakley, Windsor and Worcester, bound for Van Mijenfjorden (Lowe Sound). (Note: Spitzbergen (Jagged Mountains) was the Dutch name of the archipelago until 1925, when they became Svalbard (Norwegian) in the Svalbard Treaty.) Vice-Admiral Stuart Bonham Carter commanded a Cruiser Covering Force (CCF) with HMS Norfolk, Suffolk and London. Operation Gearbox II, a concurrent supply run, was to be made to Svalbard by the cruisers Cumberland and Sheffield with the destroyer HMS Eclipse detached from the CCF. A Distant Covering Force (Vice Admiral Bruce Fraser) with the battleships HMS Anson and Duke of York, the cruiser Jamaica and five short-range destroyers, was to sail from Akureyri on the north Icelandic coast. Four submarines took station off the Lofoten Islands and three off northern Norway.

== Voyage ==
=== 13–15/16 September ===
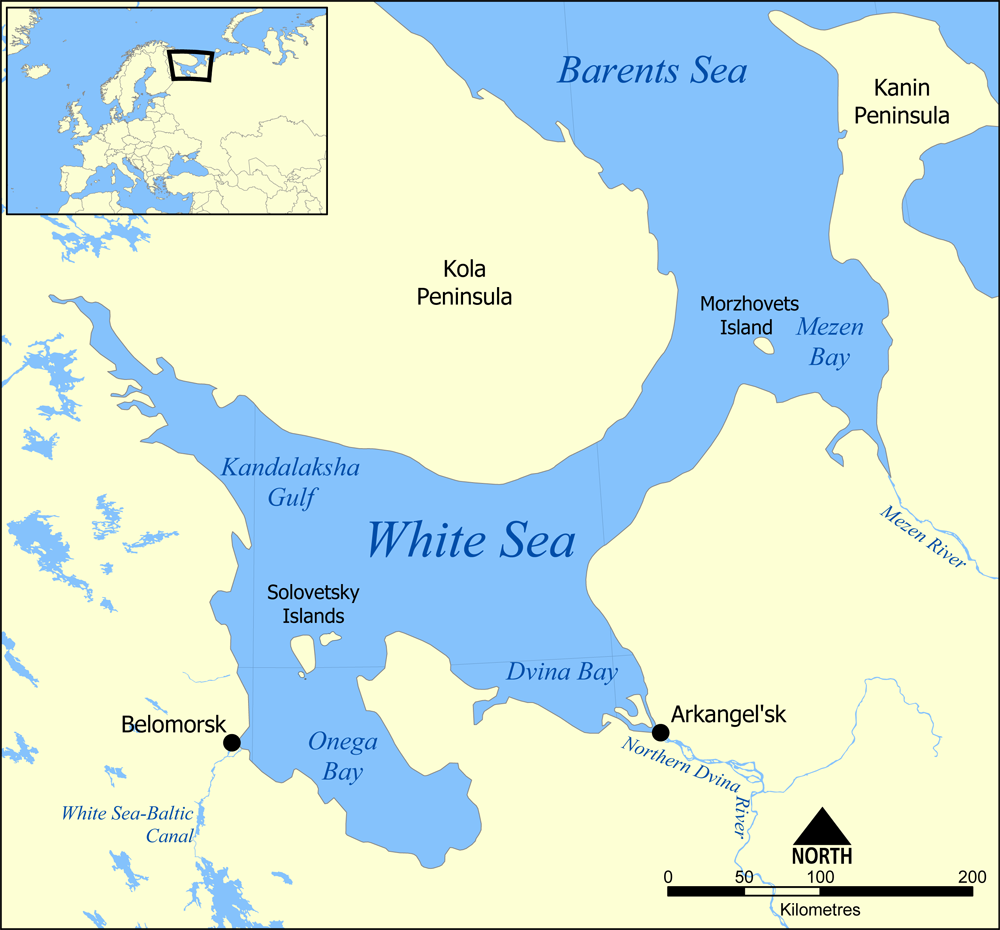
Map of Arkhangelsk, the Dvina Bay and the White Sea

Convoy QP 14 departed Arkhangelsk on 13 September, the day after German attacks on Convoy PQ 18 began. The convoy was accompanied by the Eastern Local Escort comprising the four anti-submarine Halcyon-class minesweepers HMS Britomart, HMS Halcyon, Hazard and Salamander, which departed after two days leaving the Close Escort of HMS Bramble (Captain J. J. W. Crombie, escort commander) with the Halcyon-class minesweepers HMS Leda and Seagull, the Hunt-class destroyers Blankney and Middleton, the anti-aircraft ships Palomares and Pozarica, the Flower-class corvettes HMS Lotus, Poppy, Dianella and La Malouine and the anti-submarine trawlers HMS Ayrshire, Lord Austin, Lord Middleton and Northern Gem. The voyage proved uneventful until the night of 15/16 September when Troubador and Winston Salem straggled from the convoy.

=== 16–17 September ===
The ground crew of Avenger had got thirteen Sea Hurricanes operational, one more than on the outbound voyage, because advantage had been taken of Avenger's merchant ship origins to store dismantled aircraft in its holds, which replaced the four aircraft lost during Convoy PQ 18. The three Swordfish remained airworthy but flying an open-cockpit aircraft in Arctic conditions was exhausting for the crews. On 16 September Convoy QP 14 passed Convoy PQ 18 and the ocean escort began to transfer, leaving Convoy PQ 18 in three groups to avoid drawing attention, completing the transfer by 3:00 a.m. on 17 September at about 75°N 48°E. The weather on 17 September was bitter cold with low, snow-laden clouds and frequent squalls. As the Germans were concentrating on Convoy PQ 18, only shadowing aircraft kept contact with Convoy QP 14, hiding in low cloud behind the ships and edging closer until anti-aircraft fire was received; as the weather worsened, the shadowing aircraft lost contact.

=== 18 September ===
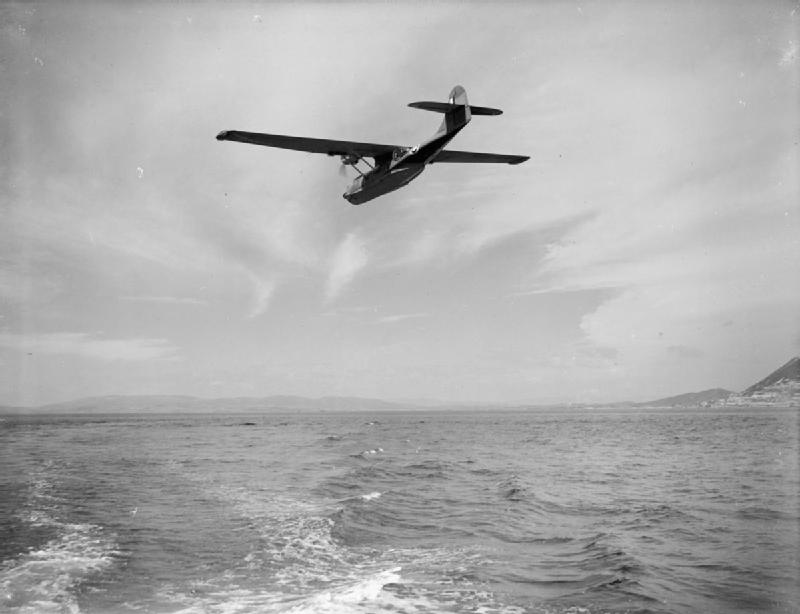
Coastal Command Catalina flying boat (CM2363)

Shadowing aircraft re-appeared before noon but lost touch in bad weather during the afternoon. During the afternoon a Catalina approached the convoy but gave the wrong recognition signal due to mistakes by the British Naval authorities at Arkhangelsk and the flying boat base at Graznaya. The Catalina crew reported that two U-boats were on the surface, ahead of the convoy, to the north-east. To keep as far as possible from the Luftwaffe airfields in Norway, Burnett made course for the Sørkapp (South Cape) of Spitzbergen in Svalbard and then head north towards Bellsundet (Bell Sound) to collect the oiler Oligarch from Force P which had fuelled the Cruiser Covering Force around 77°N 5°E on 17 and 18 September. Burnett sent the destroyers Impulsive and Fury ahead to make rendezvous, Force Q having run out of fuel, 5,600 long tons (5,700 t) having been taken by the escorts during Operation EV. During the evening, a Swordfish spotted a U-boat about 20 nmi (37 km; 23 mi) behind the convoy at 76°N 28°E and attacked with depth-charges, with no obvious result.

=== 19 September ===
During the morning, Offa was sent to check on mastheads seen to the north-east, which had caused apprehension that a German sortie by surface ships was under way. Offa found the superstructure to be Winston Salem, which had been creeping along the edge of the Polar ice and it was escorted back to the convoy. To decoy the shadowing U-boats, Burnett sent several destroyers across the wake of the convoy as it turned north-west, to sail up the west coast of Spitzbergen; after 6 nmi (11 km; 6.9 mi) the decoys re-joined the escorts. U-boats 7 nmi (13 km; 8.1 mi), 29 nmi (54 km; 33 mi), 12 nmi (22 km; 14 mi) distant from the convoy between 5:30 a.m. and 8:00 a.m. spotted by Swordfish crews, were forced to dive but a German reconnaissance aircraft was present at 8:20 a.m. to observe the final course change. A distress call was received from a ship 60 nmi (110 km; 69 mi) to the south-east, which turned out to be Troubador, under attack by a U-boat. At 1:00 p.m. a Swordfish was sent to provide air cover while Onslaught raced to the scene. There were indications of several U-boats in the vicinity and Commander William Selby, the captain of Onslaught, had depth-charges dropped periodically and shone searchlights to deter the U-boats from attacking, while urging Troubador to make its best speed. Night fell and the ships headed for Bellsundet (Bell Sound) to join Force P, the oiler Blue Ranger and its three accompanying destroyers, with which they returned to Britain. Convoy QP 14 had met Oligarch, Worcester, Impulsive and Fury, Worcester taking the place of Onslaught in the close escort as the Fighting Destroyer Escort spent the night chasing Asdic contacts.

=== 20 September ===
At 5:20 a.m. Leda, at 76°30′N 05°00′E in the rear of the convoy, was hit by two torpedoes from U-453. The ship remained afloat for an hour and the captain, Commander Wynne-Edwards, 86 members of the crew and two merchant navy passengers were rescued but six men died of their wounds or of hypothermia; the survivors were accommodated in Seagull, Rathlin and Zamalek. As more U-boats came into the vicinity of the convoy, Swordfish patrols began to spot them on the surface and before noon about five U-boats were stalking the convoy. At 11:20 a.m. a Swordfish crew depth-charged a U-boat 15 nmi (28 km; 17 mi) to the rear of the convoy at 76°10′N 02°50′E as it submerged and two destroyers racing to the scene were then re-directed by the crew towards another U-boat, which evaded them. At 12:30 p.m. Ashanti, at full speed, on another search at 76°00′N 01°30′E, spotted a U-boat as it dived, then saw its periscope 1 nmi (1.9 km; 1.2 mi) distant and dropped several salvoes of depth-charges, leading to bubbles of air and oil being seen as Asdic contact was lost, the U-boat being claimed as sunk. (Note: The claim was later not upheld.) Before the submarines P. 614 and P. 615 were due to depart from the convoy, Burnett ordered them to drop back and set an ambush, Opportune covering them. At about 3:00 p.m. the submarines split up and submerged. At 3:20 p.m. the captain of P. 614 saw U-408 on the surface at 76°20′N 00°30′E and fired torpedoes from .5 nmi (0.93 km; 0.58 mi) distance. A lookout on the U-boat saw a torpedo and the boat crash-dived; the first torpedo exploded prematurely and this set off the second torpedo.

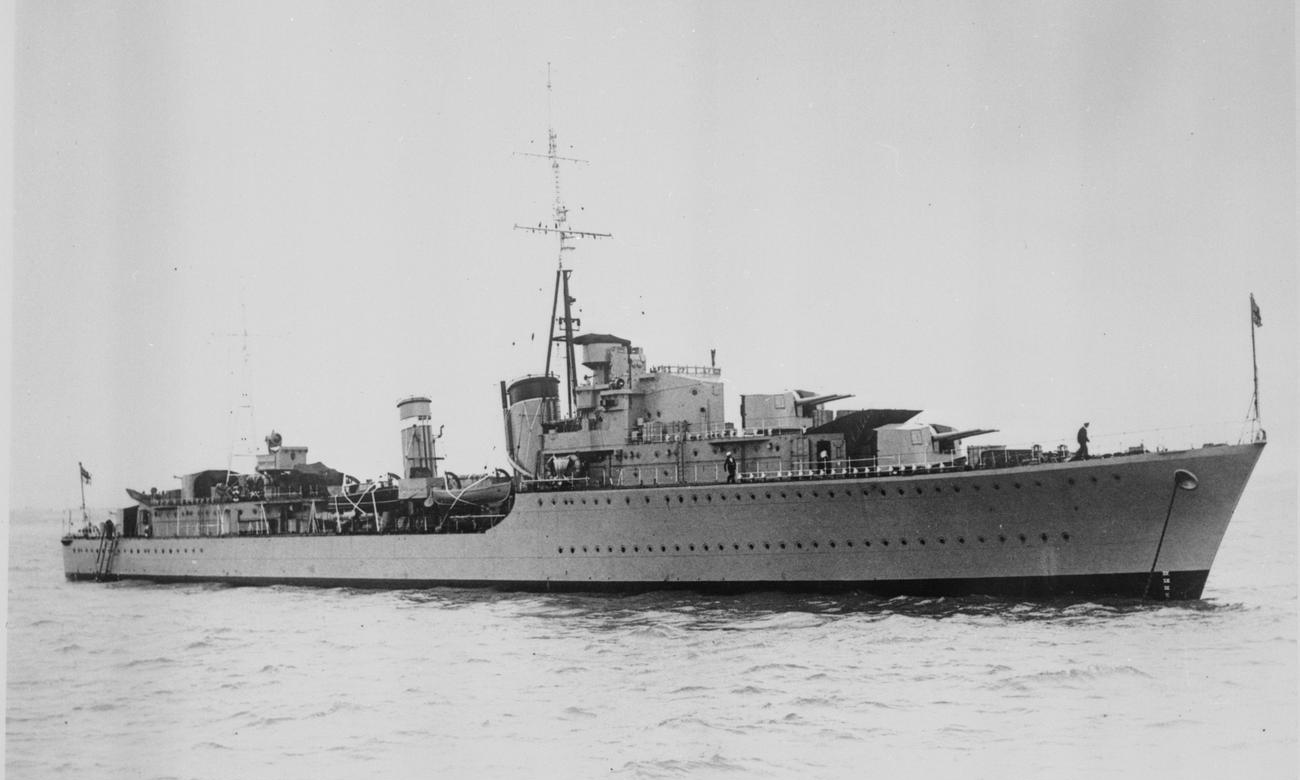
HMS Somali, photographed in 1939

P. 615 found no U-boats and both boats then began their journeys to Britain, arriving by 25 September. At 5:45 p.m. Silver Sword at the rear of the convoy at 75°50′N 00°40′W was torpedoed by U-255 and caught fire. The crew was rescued with considerable difficulty and the hulk was sunk by gunfire from Worcester. During the Polar twilight, the captain of Avenger, Commander Anthony Colthurst, signalled to Burnett that the Swordfish crews were exhausted. Burnett decided that Avenger and Scylla, his flagship, had become liabilities and at 6:30 p.m. Burnett transferred to the destroyer Milne; soon afterwards, Avenger, Scylla with Wheatland, Wilton and Fury departed the convoy. At 7:00 p.m. on the port side of Convoy QP 14 at 75°40′N 02°00′W, the destroyer Somali was torpedoed by U-703. Eskimo and Intrepid commenced Asdic sweeps as Opportune and Lord Middleton manoeuvred to take off survivors. Lieutenant-commander Colin Maud, captain of Somali urged that his ship be taken under tow and Burnett ordered Ashanti to help.

=== 21 September ===
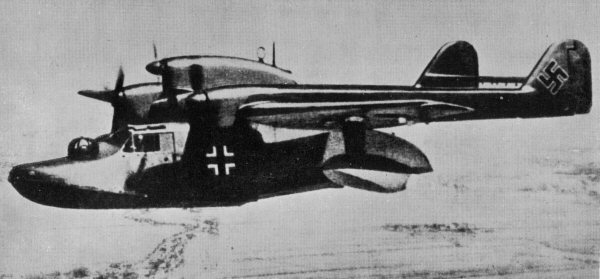
Blohm und Voss BV 138 reconnaissance flying-boat

High-frequency direction finding (huff-duff) detected wireless transmissions from at least three U-boats near the convoy and two BV 138 flying boats arrived to shadow the ships. With ships assisting Somali astern, Burnett ordered Milne back from the convoy to check on the towing attempt but had to break wireless silence to find their position, which was another 40 nmi (74 km; 46 mi) away. Burnett turned back and as Milne returned to the convoy, another U-boat was spotted trailing the convoy, which dived and escaped. The convoy had reached a position to which Catalina flying-boats from Shetland could reach and one had escorted briefly the convoy. Later in the morning Z-Zebra, the 330 (Norwegian) Squadron Catalina, returned and attacked U-378, which replied with anti-aircraft fire and damaged the Catalina. The crew continued the attack as their aircraft lost fuel and dropped four depth-charges at the U-boat. The Catalina crew landed and were taken on board by Marne, which sank the flying-boat with gunfire. Soon after, at 11:15 a.m. Bramble and Worcester dropped depth-charges at 73°50′N 8°20′W. The attack was thwarted when a U-boat used a Pillenwerfer to release a Bold (an Asdic decoy). The lack of success of the anti-submarine effort was thought to be due to differing sea densities which interfered with Asdic but five U-boats had been damaged.

=== 22 September ===
At 5:30 a.m. Burnett took Milne towards Seidisfiord in Iceland, leaving Alan Scott-Moncrieff, commander of the flotilla leader Faulknor, head of Destroyer Force B, to command the remaining eleven destroyers and nine smaller escort craft. At 6:30 a.m. about 71°N 11°W, U-435 got inside the escort screen and quickly sank Bellingham, Ocean Voice and the Force Q oiler Gray Ranger. The convoy commodore, John Dowding, was shipwrecked again and with his staff was rescued by Seagull, no casualties being suffered in the sunken ships. Dowding remained in Seagull and handed over to the vice-convoy commodore in Ocean Freedom. Scott-Moncrieff drew in the convoy screen, Middleton and Impulsive patrolling the flanks; a U-boat sighting during the afternoon turned out to be the last and Worcester zig-zagged across the rear of the cordon during the night, depth-charges being dropped occasionally as a deterrent.

=== 23–26 September ===
Regular Catalina patrols began to appear; Rathlin and Zamalek sailed for Seidisfiord to re-victual, Onslow, Offa and Worcester put in to re-fuel and Marne dropped off the crew of Z-Zebra at Akureyri, its base in Iceland. Langanes (Long Peninsula) at the north-east of Iceland came into view at 5:20 p.m. the convoy passing to the south towards Cape Wrath. The weather deteriorated, a gale blowing from the north-east. Catalina U-Uncle from 210 Squadron reached Convoy QP 14 at 6:00 a.m. and flying back along its course, soon saw U-253 and attacked at very low altitude. The crew dropped six depth-charges whose detonations forced the U-boat to the surface, it submerged again, re-surfaced then sank bows first. The gale backed to the north, causing the merchant ships to yaw, roll and scend, leading to Winston Salem heaving to, facing the gale. Despite the risk, Scott-Moncrieff sent Martin to keep watch. By 25 September the gale abated and the convoy sailed on in a heavy swell. The rescue ships and three destroyers detached to Seidisfiord returned to the convoy. During the next day, Bramble and Seagull left for Scapa Flow, followed by Middleton, Blankney, Oligarch and Black Ranger. When the convoy reached Cape Wrath, Faulknor led the Home Fleet destroyers to Scapa and Acting-Commander Archibald Russell, in Malcolm, guarded the ships as they anchored at Loch Ewe, Winston Salem arriving later.

== Aftermath ==
=== Analysis ===
Burnett wrote "for eighteen days there was no let-up"; he had doubts about the results of Operation EV, dwelling on the risks run, particularly the Allied dependence on oilers to refuel the destroyers. The consequences of greater German success could have been dire, had the Luftwaffe and Kriegsmarine better co-ordinated their attacks or had the destroyers run out of ammunition. If the weather prevented re-fuelling, EV could have become a "tragic failure". The official historian, Stephen Roskill, wrote in 1962 that Burnett's decision to detach Avenger and its escorts forfeited routine anti-submarine flights and that Somali was torpedoed soon afterwards. Burnett signalled for land-based aircraft and on 21 September, Catalina and Liberator aircraft from Iceland and Shetland gave about four hours' protection but Convoy SC 100 in the Atlantic was also under attack and this limited the cover available for Convoy QP 14. On 22 September, the weather grounded the shore-based aircraft and three ships were sunk in quick succession. The lack of aircraft and the exhaustion of the warship crews probably contributed to U-435 getting inside the escort screen.

In 2004, Richard Woodman wrote that the gamble was worth it. EV showed the crews of the smaller close escort vessels that the destroyers had proved their worth. When there were no air-raids [during Convoy PQ 18] the destroyers performed

...countless anti-submarine hunts, counter-attacks and investigations, continuous zig-zagging in formation...moving to fill gaps of others away chasing contacts and during lulls, topping-up with oil or running alongside to take on or transfer survivors.

== Allied order of battle ==
=== Merchant ships ===
Merchant ships in Convoy QP 14
| Name | Year | Flag | GRT | Notes |
|---|---|---|---|---|
| SS Alcoa Banner | 1919 | United States | 5,035 | |
| SS Bellingham | 1920 | United States | 5,345 | Sunk U-435 22 September W of Jan Mayen Island, crew rescued |
| SS Benjamin Harrison | 1942 | United States | 2,191 | |
| SS Deer Lodge | 1919 | United States | 6,187 | |
| MV Empire Tide | 1941 | Merchant Navy | 6,978 | MAC ship, 23 passengers |
| SS Harmatris | 1932 | Merchant Navy | 5,395 | |
| SS Minotaur | 1918 | United States | 4,554 | |
| SS Ocean Freedom | 1942 | Merchant Navy | 7,173 | Vice-Convoy Commodore, 8 passengers |
| SS Ocean Voice | 1941 | Merchant Navy | 7,174 | Convoy Commodore, sunk U-435, 22 September, no loss. (Note: Survivors picked up by Seagull, landed at Scapa Flow and Zamalek, which landed at Glasgow.) |
| SS Rathlin | 1936 | Merchant Navy | 1,600 | Convoy rescue ship, routed via Seidisfjord, 23 September, for stores |
| SS Samuel Chase | 1942 | United States | 7,191 | |
| SS Silver Sword | 1919 | United States | 4,937 | Torpedoed U-255, Spitzbergen, 20 September, scuttled Worcester (Note: One man killed; survivors rescued by Rathlin and Zamalek and landed at Glasgow.) |
| SS Tobruk | 1942 | Poland | 7,048 | |
| SS Troubador | 1920 | Panama | 6,428 | Straggled 15/16 September, joined Force P, 19 September |
| SS West Nilus | 1920 | United States | 5,495 | |
| SS Winston-Salem | 1920 | United States | 6,223 | Straggled 15/16 September, rejoined 19 September |
| SS Zamalek | 1921 | Merchant Navy | 1,567 | Convoy rescue ship, 4 passengers, 61 survivors |

=== Force Q ===
Force Q
| Name | Year | Flag | GRT | Notes |
|---|---|---|---|---|
| RFA Black Ranger | 1941 | Royal Fleet Auxiliary | 3,417 | Oiler, sailed Convoy PQ 18, returned Convoy QP 14 |
| RFA Gray Ranger | 1941 | Royal Fleet Auxiliary | 3,313 | Oiler, returned Convoy QP 14; sunk U-435, 22 September, Jan Mayen (Note: Six killed, survivors picked up by Rathlin) |

=== Escorts ===
Escort forces (Note: Data from Llewellyn-Jones unless indicated)
| Name | Flag | Type | Notes |
Eastern local escort
| HMS Britomart | Royal Navy | Halcyon-class minesweeper | 13–15 September |
| HMS Halcyon | Royal Navy | Halcyon-class minesweeper | 13–15 September |
| HMS Hazard | Royal Navy | Halcyon-class minesweeper | 13–15 September |
| HMS Salamander | Royal Navy | Halcyon-class minesweeper | 13–15 September |
| HMT Lord Middleton | Royal Navy | ASW trawler | 13–15 September |
Oceanic escort
| HMS Alynbank | Royal Navy | Anti-aircraft cruiser | Left 16 September, joined Convoy QP 14, 17 September |
| HMS Palomares | Royal Navy | Anti-aircraft cruiser | 13–26 September |
| HMS Pozarica | Royal Navy | Anti-aircraft cruiser | 23–26 September |
| HMS Blankney | Royal Navy | Hunt-class destroyer | 13–25 September |
| HMS Middleton | Royal Navy | Hunt-class destroyer | 13–25 September |
| HMS Dianella | Royal Navy | Flower-class corvette | 13–26 September |
| HMS La Malouine | Royal Navy | Flower-class corvette | 13–26 September |
| HMS Lotus | Royal Navy | Flower-class corvette | 13–26 September |
| HMS Poppy | Royal Navy | Flower-class corvette | 13–26 September |
| HMS Bramble | Royal Navy | Halcyon-class minesweeper | 13–25 September |
| HMS Leda | Royal Navy | Halcyon-class minesweeper | 13–20 September, sunk U-435, 20 September S-W Spitzbergen (Note: Commander A. H. Wynne-Edwards, 85 crew and two passengers rescued and distributed in Seagull, Rathlin and Zamalek; six men died of wounds or hypothermia.) |
| HMS Seagull | Royal Navy | Halcyon-class minesweeper | 13–25 September |
| HMT Ayrshire | Royal Navy | AWS trawler | 13–25 September |
| HMT Lord Austin | Royal Navy | ASW trawler | 13–25 September |
| HMT Northern Gem | Royal Navy | ASW trawler | 13–25 September |
| HMS P. 614 | Royal Navy | Oruç Reis-class submarine | Joined Convoy QP 14, 17 September |
| HMS P. 615 | Royal Navy | Oruç Reis-class submarine | Joined Convoy QP 14, 17 September |
Distant cover (Home Fleet))
| HMS Anson | Royal Navy | King George V-class battleship | 19–22 September, flag, Vice-Admiral Bruce Fraser |
| HMS Duke of York | Royal Navy | King George V-class battleship | 19–22 September |
| HMS Jamaica | Royal Navy | Fiji-class cruiser | 19–22 September |
| HMS Bramham | Royal Navy | Hunt-class destroyer | 23 September (Note: Replaced by Broke on second sortie) |
| HMS Broke | Royal Navy | Flotilla leader | Replaced Bramham on second sortie |
| HMS Keppel | Royal Navy | Flotilla leader | 19–22 September |
| HMS Mackay | Royal Navy | Scott-class destroyer | 19–22 September |
Carrier force
| HMS Avenger | Royal Navy | Escort carrier | Convoy PQ 18, transferred to Convoy QP 14, 17–20 September |
| HMS Wheatland | Royal Navy | Hunt-class destroyer | 17–20 September |
| HMS Wilton | Royal Navy | Hunt-class destroyer | 17–20 September |
Cruiser cover (Convoy PQ 18 and Convoy QP 14)
| HMS Cumberland | Royal Navy | County-class cruiser | Detached cruiser force 16–18 September, Spitzbergen |
| HMS London | Royal Navy | County-class cruiser | 14–22 September, Cruiser covering force |
| HMS Norfolk | Royal Navy | County-class cruiser | Flagship (Vice-Admiral S. S. Bonham Carter) 14–22 September |
| HMS Scylla | Royal Navy | Dido-class cruiser | 17–20 September, Flag, (Rear-Admiral Robert Burnett) |
| HMS Sheffield | Royal Navy | Town-class cruiser | Detached cruiser force 17–19 September, Spitzbergen |
| HMS Suffolk | Royal Navy | County-class cruiser | 14–22 September, cruiser covering force |
| HMS Amazon | Royal Navy | Destroyer | 15–22 September |
| HMS Bulldog | Royal Navy | B-class destroyer | 14–22 September |
| HMS Echo | Royal Navy | E-class destroyer | |
Destroyer Group A
| HMS Ashanti | Royal Navy | Tribal-class destroyer | 17–21 September |
| HMS Eskimo | Royal Navy | Tribal-class destroyer | 17–21 September |
| HMS Somali | Royal Navy | Tribal-class destroyer | 17–20 September, torpedoed U-703, 20 September. (Note: Most of the crew rescued by Lord Middleton and Opportune; skeleton crew stayed aboard; Ashanti began a tow but the line parted, Somali folded in two, capsized and sank; 47 men sank with the ship, were washed away or died of hypothermia on Ashanti; 35 survivors.) |
| HMS Tartar | Royal Navy | Tribal-class destroyer | 17–25 September |
| HMS Offa | Royal Navy | O-class destroyer | 17–25 September |
| HMS Onslaught | Royal Navy | O-class destroyer | 17–25 September, detached 19 September for Troubador, Force P |
| HMS Onslow | Royal Navy | O-class destroyer | 17–25 September |
| HMS Opportune | Royal Navy | O-class destroyer | 17–21 September |
Destroyer group B
| HMS Faulknor | Royal Navy | F-class destroyer | 17–25 September |
| HMS Fury | Royal Navy | F-class destroyer | 17–20 September, detached 18–19 September for Oligarch |
| HMS Impulsive | Royal Navy | I-class destroyer | 17–25 September w. local escort, det. 18–19 September |
| HMS Intrepid | Royal Navy | I-class destroyer | 17–21 September |
| HMS Marne | Royal Navy | M-class destroyer | 17–25 September, 19 September, rescued Catalina crew |
| HMS Meteor | Royal Navy | M-class destroyer | 17–25 September |
| HMS Milne | Royal Navy | M-class destroyer | 17–22 September |

=== Force P ===
Force P (Note: Data from Llewellyn-Jones (2014) unless indicated)
| Name | Flag | Type | Notes |
|---|---|---|---|
| RFA Blue Ranger | Royal Fleet Auxiliary | Oiler | 14–20 September, Spitzbergen re-fuelling force |
| RFA Oligarch | Royal Fleet Auxiliary | Oiler | 14–18 September, Spitzbergen re-fuelling force |
| HMS Cowdray | Royal Navy | Hunt-class destroyer | 14–20 September, Spitzbergen re-fuelling force |
| HMS Oakley | Royal Navy | Hunt-class destroyer | 14 –20 September, Spitzbergen re-fuelling force |
| HMS Windsor | Royal Navy | W-class destroyer | 14–20 September, Spitzbergen re-fuelling force |
| HMS Worcester | Royal Navy | Modified W-class destroyer | 19–25 September, Spitzbergen re-fuelling force |

=== Operation Gearbox II ===
Spitzbergen supply mission (Note: Details from Llewellyn-Jones (2014) unless indicated)
| Name | Flag | Type | Notes |
|---|---|---|---|
| HMS Cumberland | Royal Navy | County-class cruiser | Detached from cruiser force, 16–18 September |
| HMS Sheffield | Royal Navy | Town-class cruiser | Detached from cruiser force, 17–19 September |
| HMS Eclipse | Royal Navy | E-class destroyer | Detached from cruiser force, 16–19 September |

=== Allied submarines ===
Allied submarines (Note: Details from Llewellyn-Jones (2014) unless indicated)
| Name | Flag | Type | Notes |
|---|---|---|---|
| HMS P. 45 | Royal Navy | S-class submarine | |
| HMS P. 221 | Royal Navy | S-class submarine | |
| HMS Unique | Royal Navy | U-class submarine | |
| HMS Tribune | Royal Navy | T-class submarine | |
| HMS Tigris | Royal Navy | T-class submarine | |
| HMS Unshaken | Royal Navy | U-class submarine | |
| HNoMS Uredd | Royal Norwegian Navy | U-class submarine | |
| Saphir | French Navy | Saphir-class submarine | |

== German forces ==
=== U-boats ===
U-boats operating against Convoy QP 14 (Note: Data from Rohwer and Hümmelchen (2005) unless indicated)
| Name | Flag | Type | Notes |
|---|---|---|---|
| U-251 | Kriegsmarine | Type VIIc submarine | |
| U-253 | Kriegsmarine | Type VIIc submarine | Sink (mined?) 67°N, 23°W, all 45† (Note: Originally mistaken for an attack on U-255.) |
| U-255 | Kriegsmarine | Type VIIc submarine | 20 September Sank Silver Sword, severely damaged, Catalina U/210 Sqn 23 September |
| U-403 | Kriegsmarine | Type VIIc submarine | |
| U-435 | Kriegsmarine | Type VIIc submarine | Sank Leda 20 September, Bellingham, Ocean Voice, Gray Ranger 22 September |
| U-592 | Kriegsmarine | Type VIIc submarine | |
| U-703 | Kriegsmarine | Type VIIc submarine | Damaged HMS Somali, 20/21 September, that foundered 24 September |

== Bibliography ==
- Bekker, Cajus (1966). The Luftwaffe War Diaries. New York: Ballantine. OCLC 657996667.
- Budiansky, S. (2000). Battle of Wits: The Complete Story of Codebreaking in World War II. New York: The Free Press (Simon & Schuster). ISBN 0-684-85932-7 – via Archive Foundation.
- Claasen, A. R. A. (2001). Hitler's Northern War: The Luftwaffe's Ill-fated Campaign, 1940–1945. Lawrence, KS: University Press of Kansas. ISBN 0-7006-1050-2.
- Edgerton, D. (2011). Britain's War Machine: Weapons, Resources and Experts in the Second World War. London: Allen Lane. ISBN 978-0-7139-9918-1.
- Hinsley, F. H. (Harry) (1994) [1993]. British Intelligence in the Second World War: Its Influence on Strategy and Operations. History of the Second World War (2nd rev. abr. ed.). London: HMSO. ISBN 978-0-11-630961-7.
- Hinsley, Francis; Thomas, E. E.; Ransom, C. F. G.; Knight, R. C. (1981). British intelligence in the Second World War: Its Influence on Strategy and Operations. History of the Second World War. Vol. II. London: HMSO. ISBN 0-521-242908.
- Howard, M. (1972). Grand Strategy: August 1942 – September 1943. History of the Second World War United Kingdom Military Series. Vol. IV. London: HMSO. ISBN 978-0-11-630075-1.
- Jordan, Roger W. (2006) [1999]. The World's Merchant Fleets 1939: The Particulars and Wartime Fates of 6,000 Ships (2nd ed.). London: Chatham/Lionel Leventhal. ISBN 978-1-86176-293-1.
- Kahn, D. (1973) [1967]. The Codebreakers: The Story of Secret Writing (10th abr. Signet, Chicago ed.). New York: Macmillan. LCCN 63-16109. OCLC 78083316.
- Llewellyn-Jones, Malcolm, ed. (2014) [2007]. The Royal Navy and the Arctic Convoys: A Navay Staff History. Naval Staff Histories. London: Routledge. ISBN 978-0-415-86177-9.
- Macksey, K. (2004) [2003]. The Searchers: Radio Intercept in two World Wars (Cassell Military Paperbacks ed.). London: Cassell. ISBN 978-0-304-36651-4.
- Mitchell, W. H.; Sawyer, L. A. (1990) [1965]. The Empire Ships: A Record of British-built and acquired Merchant Ships during the Second World War (2nd ed.). London (New York, Hamburg, Hong Kong): Lloyd's of London Press. ISBN 1-85044-275-4.
- Rohwer, Jürgen; Hümmelchen, Gerhard (2005) [1972]. Chronology of the War at Sea, 1939–1945: The Naval History of World War Two (3rd rev. ed.). London: Chatham Publishing. ISBN 1-86176-257-7.
- Roskill, S. W. (1962) [1956]. The Period of Balance. History of the Second World War: The War at Sea 1939–1945. Vol. II (3rd impr. ed.). London: HMSO. OCLC 174453986.
- Ruegg, R.; Hague, A. (1993) [1992]. Convoys to Russia: Allied Convoys and Naval Surface Operations in Arctic Waters 1941–1945 (2nd rev. enl. ed.). Kendal: World Ship Society. ISBN 0-905617-66-5.
- Sharpe, Peter (1998). U-Boat Fact File: Detailed Service Histories of the Submarines Operated by the Kriegsmarine 1935–1945. Leicester: Midland Publishing. ISBN 978-1-85-780072-2.
- Smith, Peter (1975). Convoy PQ18: Arctic Victory. London: William Kimber. ISBN 978-0-7183-0074-6.
- The Rise and Fall of the German Air Force (facs. repr. Public Record Office War Histories ed.). Richmond, Surrey: Air Ministry. 2001 [1948]. ISBN 978-1-903365-30-4. Air 41/10 number 248.
- Walling, M. G. (2012). Forgotten Sacrifice: The Arctic Convoys of World War II. General Military. Oxford: Osprey. ISBN 978-1-84908-718-6.
- Wood, Tony; Gunston, Bill (1990). Hitler's Luftwaffe. New York: Crescent Books. OCLC 704898536.
- Woodman, Richard (2004) [1994]. Arctic Convoys 1941–1945. London: John Murray. ISBN 978-0-7195-5752-1.

Websites

- "Birth of Radio Intelligence in Finland and its Developer Reino Hallamaa". Pohjois–Kymenlaakson Asehistoriallinen Yhdistys Ry (North-Karelia Historical Association Ry) (in Finnish). 1996.
