= Wolfpack Ungestüm =

- Active: 11 December 1942 - 30 December 1942
- Country: Nazi Germany
- Branch: Kriegsmarine
- Size: 13 submarines

Commanders
- Notable commanders: Siegfried Strelow

Ungestüm (Vehemence) was the name given to a wolfpack of German U-boats that operated during the World War II Battle of the Atlantic from 11 December 1942 to 30 December 1942.

== Ungestüm ==
The group was responsible for sinking nine merchant ships 33,130 gross register tons (GRT) and damaging one merchant ship 5,701 GRT.

=== Raiding History ===
Date	U-boat	Name of ship	GRT	Nationality	Convoy	Fate
21 December 1942	U-591	Montreal City	3,066	United Kingdom	ON 152	Sunk
28 December 1942	U-591	Norse King	5,701	Norway	ONS 154	Damaged
29 December 1942	U-435	Empire Shackleton	7,068	United Kingdom	ONS 154	Sunk
29 December 1942	U-628	Lynton Grange	5,029	United Kingdom	ONS 154	Sunk
29 December 1942	U-435	Norse King	5,701	Norway	ONS 154	Sunk
29 December 1942	U-336	President Francqui	4,919	Belgium	ONS 154	Sunk
29 December 1942	U-591	Zarian	4,871	United Kingdom	ONS 154	Sunk
30 December 1942	U-435	HMS Fidelity	2,456	Royal Navy	ONS 154	Sunk
30 December 1942	U-435	HMS LCV-752	10	Royal Navy	ONS 154	Sunk while being transported
30 December 1942	U-435	HMS LCV-754	10	Royal Navy	ONS 154	Sunk while being transported
38,831						

=== U-boats ===
U-boat	Commander	From	To
U-336	Hans Hunger	11 December 1942	30 December 1942
U-373	Paul-Karl Loeser	15 December 1942	26 December 1942
U-435	Siegfried Strelow	11 December 1942	30 December 1942
U-445	Heinz-Konrad Fenn	15 December 1942	25 December 1942
U-455	Hans-Martin Scheibe	11 December 1942	30 December 1942
U-524	Walter von Steinaecker	11 December 1942	23 December 1942
U-569	Hans-Peter Hinsch	11 December 1942	22 December 1942
U-591	Hans-Jürgen Zetzsche	11 December 1942	30 December 1942
U-604	Horst Höltring	11 December 1942	22 December 1942
U-610	Walter Freiherr von Freyberg-Eisenberg-Allmendingen	11 December 1942	13 December 1942
U-615	Ralph Kapitzky	11 December 1942	30 December 1942
U-623	Hermann Schröder	11 December 1942	13 December 1942
U-628	Heinrich Hasenschar	11 December 1942	30 December 1942
