= Special service vessel =

Special service vessel (SSV) is a designation used by the Royal Navy for a miscellaneous group of ships in service; a catch-all term for ships that did not fit into its more regular categories.

The Navy List of 1906 records 19 SSVs, mainly tenders assigned to shore establishments.

In the First World War the category included yachts (five, including three Royal Yachts), ferries (four), retired gunboats (nine), and three ex-Russian ice-breakers. However the largest group of special service vessels in World War I were civilian vessels taken unto service as submarine decoy ships; some 116 of the more than 200 decoy vessels in service were classed as SSVs, to preserve secrecy about their function.

During the Second World War the Royal Navy outfitted nine submarine decoy ships, which were classed as SSVs; the category also included such ships as Golden Eagle, an anti-aircraft paddle steamer, and Glengyle, a fast supply ship. Probably the best-known special service vessel of World War II was HMS Fidelity, the home of an independent group of fighting Frenchmen led by ex-French Navy officer Jack Langlais. Fidelity carried out several clandestine missions under the auspices of Britain's Special Operations Executive, before being outfitted as the depot ship for an amphibious raiding force of marine commandos. Fidelity was torpedoed and sunk as part of convoy ON 154, en route to the Far East.
