= Pier 9 =

Pier 9 may refer to:

- Pier 9 Books, an alternate name for Murdoch Books
- Pier 9 (Baltimore), once Baltimore's arrival dock for incoming immigrants -- see Kerry Range.
