= German submarine U-591 =

German World War II submarine

History

Nazi Germany
- Name: U-591
- Ordered: 16 January 1940
- Builder: Blohm & Voss, Hamburg
- Yard number: 567
- Laid down: 30 October 1940
- Launched: 20 August 1941
- Commissioned: 9 October 1941
- Fate: Sunk on 30 July 1943 in the South Atlantic near Pernambuco in position 08°36′S 34°34′W, by depth charges from a US Lockheed Ventura aircraft.

General characteristics
- Class & type: Type VIIC submarine
- Displacement: 769 tonnes (757 long tons) surfaced; 871 t (857 long tons) submerged
- Length: 67.10 m (220 ft 2 in) o/a; 50.50 m (165 ft 8 in) pressure hull
- Beam: 6.20 m (20 ft 4 in) o/a; 4.70 m (15 ft 5 in) pressure hull
- Height: 9.60 m (31 ft 6 in)
- Draught: 4.74 m (15 ft 7 in)
- Installed power: 2,800–3,200 PS (2,100–2,400 kW; 2,800–3,200 bhp) (diesels); 750 PS (550 kW; 740 shp) (electric)
- Propulsion: 2 shafts; 2 × diesel engines; 2 × electric motors
- Speed: 17.7 knots (32.8 km/h; 20.4 mph) surfaced; 7.6 knots (14.1 km/h; 8.7 mph) submerged
- Range: 8,500 nmi (15,700 km; 9,800 mi) at 10 knots (19 km/h; 12 mph) surfaced; 80 nmi (150 km; 92 mi) at 4 knots (7.4 km/h; 4.6 mph) submerged
- Test depth: 230 m (750 ft); Crush depth: 250–295 m (820–968 ft)
- Complement: 4 officers, 40–56 enlisted
- Armament: 5 × 53.3 cm (21 in) torpedo tubes (four bow, one stern); 14 × torpedoes or 26 TMA mines; 1 × 8.8 cm (3.46 in) deck gun (220 rounds); 1 x 2 cm (0.79 in) C/30 AA gun

Service record
- Part of: 6th U-boat Flotilla; 9 October 1941 – 30 June 1942; 11th U-boat Flotilla; 1 July 1942 – 31 May 1943; 9th U-boat Flotilla; 1 June – 30 July 1943
- Identification codes: M 37 230
- Commanders: Kptlt. Hans-Jürgen Zetzsche; 9 October 1941 – 8 September 1942; Oblt.z.S. Peter Schrewe; 9 September – 12 November 1942; Kptlt. Hans-Jürgen Zetzsche; 12 November 1942 – 17 May 1943; Lt.z.S. Joachim Sauerbier; 15 – 17 May 1943; Oblt.z.S. Reimar Ziesmer; 1 June – 30 July 1943
- Operations: 8 patrols: 1st patrol: 15 January – 20 February 1942; 2nd patrol: 1 – 11 April 1942; 3rd patrol: a. 10 May – 2 June 1942; b. 4 – 7 June 1942; 4th patrol: a. 27 July – 14 August 1942; b. 22 – 24 August 1942; c. 27 August 1942; d. 28 – 29 August 1942; e. 8 – 9 September 1942; f. 11 – 12 September 1942; 5th patrol: 1 December 1942 – 12 January 1943; 6th patrol: 17 February – 7 April 1943; 7th patrol: 12 – 17 May 1943; 8th patrol: 26 June – 30 July 1943
- Victories: 4 merchant ships sunk (19,932 GRT); 1 merchant ship damaged (5,701 GRT)

German submarine U-591 was a Type VIIC U-boat built for Nazi Germany's Kriegsmarine for service during World War II. She was laid down on 30 October 1940 by Blohm & Voss, Hamburg as yard number 567, launched on 20 August 1941 and commissioned on 9 October 1941 under Kapitänleutnant Hans-Jürgen Zetzsche.

== Design ==
German Type VIIC submarines were preceded by the shorter Type VIIB submarines. U-591 had a displacement of 769 tonnes (757 long tons) when at the surface and 871 tonnes (857 long tons) while submerged. She had a total length of 67.10 m (220 ft 2 in), a pressure hull length of 50.50 m (165 ft 8 in), a beam of 6.20 m (20 ft 4 in), a height of 9.60 m (31 ft 6 in), and a draught of 4.74 m (15 ft 7 in). The submarine was powered by two Germaniawerft F46 four-stroke, six-cylinder supercharged diesel engines producing a total of 2,800 to 3,200 metric horsepower (2,060 to 2,350 kW; 2,760 to 3,160 shp) for use while surfaced, two Brown, Boveri & Cie GG UB 720/8 double-acting electric motors producing a total of 750 metric horsepower (550 kW; 740 shp) for use while submerged. She had two shafts and two 1.23 m (4 ft) propellers. The boat was capable of operating at depths of up to 230 metres (750 ft).

The submarine had a maximum surface speed of 17.7 knots (32.8 km/h; 20.4 mph) and a maximum submerged speed of 7.6 knots (14.1 km/h; 8.7 mph). When submerged, the boat could operate for 80 nautical miles (150 km; 92 mi) at 4 knots (7.4 km/h; 4.6 mph); when surfaced, she could travel 8,500 nautical miles (15,700 km; 9,800 mi) at 10 knots (19 km/h; 12 mph). U-591 was fitted with five 53.3 cm (21 in) torpedo tubes (four fitted at the bow and one at the stern), fourteen torpedoes, one 8.8 cm (3.46 in) SK C/35 naval gun, 220 rounds, and a 2 cm (0.79 in) C/30 anti-aircraft gun. The boat had a complement of between forty-four and sixty.

== Service history ==
The boat's service began on 9 October 1941 with training, followed by active service as part of the 6th U-boat Flotilla. She was transferred to the 11th Flotilla on 1 July 1942 for active service in the North Atlantic operating out of Bergen. The following year, on 1 June 1943, she transferred to 9th Flotilla operating of Brest, France.

In 8 patrols she sank four merchant ships, for a total of 19,932 gross register tons (GRT), plus one merchant ship damaged.

=== Convoy ONS 154 ===
The first victim of Convoy ONS 154 was the 5,701-GRT Norwegian freighter Norse King, the second in column eleven, on 28 December 1942. U-591 torpedo hit her at 20:04. Badly damaged, Norse King attempted to limp to the Azores but was found by U-435 and sent to the bottom.
U-591’s second success was the badly damaged and abandoned 4,871-GRT United Africa Company freighter Zarian with a single torpedo, although she missed the Baron Cochrane

=== Convoy SC 121 ===
Having recently returned to sea after a long recovery from gunshot wounds, Hans-Jürgen Zetzsche was on target with Convoy SC 121 when he sighted the Empire Impala, hove-to picking up survivors from the torpedoed Egyptian, on 7 March 1943. Of the combined crew of 80 men, from both Egyptian and Empire Impala, only 3 survived.

=== Fate ===
U-591 was sunk on 30 July 1943 in the South Atlantic near Pernambuco in position 08°36′S 34°34′W; depth charged by a US Lockheed Ventura aircraft of VB-127. There were 19 dead and 28 survivors.

=== Wolfpacks ===
U-591 took part in nine wolfpacks, namely:

- Schlei (21 January – 12 February 1942)
- Bums (6 – 10 April 1942)
- Greif (14 – 29 May 1942)
- Nebelkönig (27 July – 13 August 1942)
- Ungestüm (11 – 30 December 1942)
- Sturmbock (21 – 26 February 1943)
- Wildfang (26 February – 5 March 1943)
- Westmark (6 – 11 March 1943)
- Seewolf (21 – 30 March 1943)

== Summary of raiding history ==
Date	Ship Name	Nationality	Tonnage (GRT)	Fate
21 December 1942	Montreal City	United Kingdom	3,066	Sunk
28 December 1942	Norse King	Norway	5,701	Damaged
29 December 1942	Zarian	United Kingdom	4,871	Sunk
7 March 1943	Empire Impala	United Kingdom	6,116	Sunk
8 March 1943	Vojvoda Putnik	Yugoslavia	5,879	Sunk

== Bibliography ==
- Busch, Rainer; Röll, Hans-Joachim (1999). German U-boat commanders of World War II : a biographical dictionary. Translated by Brooks, Geoffrey. London, Annapolis, Md: Greenhill Books, Naval Institute Press. ISBN 1-55750-186-6.
- Busch, Rainer; Röll, Hans-Joachim (1999). Der U-Boot-Krieg, 1939-1945: Deutsche U-Boot-Verluste von September 1939 bis Mai 1945 [German U-boat losses from September 1939 to May 1945] (in German). Vol. IV. Hamburg, Berlin, Bonn: Mittler. ISBN 3-8132-0514-2.
- Edwards, Bernard (1996). Dönitz and the Wolf Packs - The U-boats at War. Cassell. pp. 137, 138, 167–169. ISBN 0-304-35203-9.
- Gröner, Eric; Jung, Dieter; Maass, Martin (1991). German Warships 1815-1945: U-boats and Mine Warfare Vessels. Vol. 2. Translated by Thomas, Keith; Magowan, Rachel. London: Conway Maritime Press. ISBN 0-85177-593-4.
- Sharpe, Peter (1998). U-Boat Fact File. Great Britain: Midland Publishing. ISBN 1-85780-072-9.
