= HMS Worcester (D96) =

Destroyer of the Royal Navy

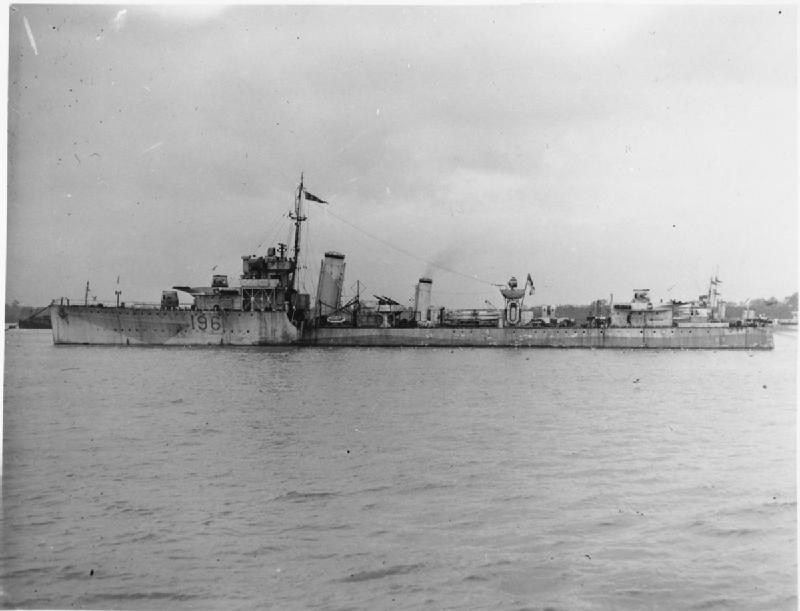
- HMS Worcester moored at a buoy during World War II, sometime between the changing of her pennant number to I96 in June 1940 and her becoming a constructive total loss in December 1943.

History

United Kingdom
- Name: HMS Worcester
- Namesake: Worcester, England
- Ordered: April 1918
- Builder: J. Samuel White, Cowes, Isle of Wight, and Royal Navy Dockyard, Portsmouth
- Laid down: 20 December 1918
- Launched: 24 October 1919
- Completed: 20 September 1922
- Commissioned: 20 September 1922
- Decommissioned: early 1930s
- Recommissioned: September 1939
- Fate: Constructive total loss 23 December 1943
- Decommissioned: April 1944
- Reclassified: Accommodation ship, May 1944
- Recommissioned: June 1945
- Renamed: HMS Yeoman, June 1945
- Fate: Sold 17 September 1946 for scrapping
- Motto: In bello in pace fidelis ("Faithful in peace and war")
- Honours and awards: Dunkirk 1940; Atlantic 1940; North Sea 1942-1943; Dover Straits 1942; English Channel 1942; Arctic 1943
- Badge: A silver castle with three towers on a field divided into black and red quarters

General characteristics
- Class & type: Admiralty Modified W-class destroyer
- Displacement: 1,140 tons standard, 1,550 tons full
- Length: 300 ft o/a, 312 ft p/p
- Beam: 29.5 feet (9.0 m)
- Draught: 9 feet (2.7 m), 11.25 feet (3.43 m) under full load
- Propulsion: Yarrow type Water-tube boilers, Brown-Curtis geared steam turbines, 2 shafts, 27,000 shp
- Speed: 34 kt
- Range: 320–370 tons oil; 3,500 nmi at 15 kt; 900 nmi at 32 kt
- Complement: 127
- Sensors & processing systems: Type 286M Air Warning Radar fitted 1940; Type 271 Surface Warning Radar fitted 1940
- Armament: As built 1920: 4 × BL 4.7 in (120-mm) Mk.I guns, mount P Mk.I; 2 × QF 2 pdr Mk.II "pom-pom" (40 mm L/39); 6 × 21-inch Torpedo Tubes; 1940 SRE conversion: 3 × BL 4.7 in (120mm) Mk.I L/45 guns; 1 × 3 in (76 mm) AA gun; 2 × QF 2 pdr Mk.II "pom-pom" (40 mm L/39); 3 × 21-inch Torpedo Tubes (one triple mount); 2 × depth charge racks; twin QF 6 pounder 10 cwt gun (1942 – replaced ‘A’ gun)

The eighth HMS Worcester (D96, later I96), was a Modified W-class destroyer of the British Royal Navy that saw service in World War II. She later served as an accommodation ship as the second HMS Yeoman.

== Construction and commissioning ==
Worcester was ordered in April 1918 as part of the 13th Order of the 1917-1918 Naval Programme. She was laid down on 20 December 1918 by J. Samuel White at Cowes, Isle of Wight, and launched on 24 October 1919. After launching, she was transferred to the Royal Navy Dockyard at Portsmouth for fitting out, and was completed there on 20 September 1922. She was commissioned into service the same day with the pennant number D96.

== Service history ==
=== Before World War II ===
After entering service with the fleet in 1922, Worcester saw service in the Atlantic Fleet and Mediterranean Fleet before being decommissioned, transferred to the Reserve Fleet, and placed in reserve at Portsmouth in the early 1930s.

In 1939, Worcester was selected for recommissioning as the fleet mobilised because of deteriorating diplomatic relations between the United Kingdom and Nazi Germany.

=== World War II ===
==== 1939–40 ====
After the United Kingdom entered World War II on 3 September 1939, Worcester prepared for war service, recommissioning that month, taking aboard stores, and reporting for duty with the 16th Destroyer Flotilla – which also included the destroyer leader HMS Montrose and the destroyers HMS Venomous, HMS Veteran, HMS Verity, HMS Whitshed, HMS Wild Swan, and HMS Wivern – at Portsmouth for convoy escort and patrol operations in the English Channel and Southwestern Approaches, which she began in October 1939. She remained on these duties until May 1940, when the German invasion of the Netherlands, Belgium, Luxembourg, and France began and she came under the Commander-in-Chief, Dover to support the evacuation of Allied personnel from Europe as German ground forces advanced. On 24 May, she was assigned to Operation Dynamo, the evacuation of Allied troops from Dunkirk, France, during which she made six trips to the Dunkirk beaches, transported a total of 4,350 troops to the United Kingdom, and suffered damage in a German air attack on 27 May 1940.

Worcester was under repair during June 1940 – the month in which her pennant number was changed to I96 – but in July 1940 she returned to service with the 16th Destroyer Flotilla, now based at Harwich, for convoy escort and patrol operations in the North Sea. In August 1940 she was transferred to Western Approaches Command for convoy defence duty in the Western Approaches, which she continued without major incident through the end of 1940.

==== 1941–42 ====
In January 1941, Worcester transferred back to the 16th Destroyer Flotilla at Harwich for more North Sea convoy escort and patrol work, this time with Whitshed and the destroyer leader HMS Mackay and destroyer HMS Walpole. In March 1941, she and Whitshed escorted Convoy FS 29, which was steaming south along the east coast of Great Britain and came under German air attack on 6 March. On 7 March, she and Whitshed chased a German motor torpedo boat – an S-boat, known to the Allies as an "E-boat" – which had been detected near the convoy; the two destroyers were unable to make contact with it. Unfortunately for the convoy, the E-boat had been serving as a decoy for the German 1st S-Boote (E-boat) Flotilla, which attacked the convoy when Worcester and Whitshed were too far away to intervene. The Germans penetrated the remaining escort – reduced to only the escort destroyer HMS Pytchley and the patrol sloop HMS Puffin – to sink two of FS 29's merchant ships.

Worcester continued her escort and patrol duties without significant incident until February 1942, when her flotilla was put on alert for the possibility that the German battlecruisers Scharnhorst and Gneisenau and heavy cruiser Prinz Eugen would attempt a breakout from Brest in German-occupied France to move to a port in Germany. In preparation for opposing such a breakout, Worcester, Mackay, Walpole, and Whitshed were conducting exercises with the destroyer leader HMS Campbell and destroyer HMS Vivacious of the 21st Destroyer Flotilla to practise torpedo attacks against enemy ships when they received word on 12 February 1942 that the German ships were indeed steaming to Germany via the English Channel, Strait of Dover, and North Sea in what was to become known as the "Channel Dash." The British ships were ordered to attack the German naval force. During her unsuccessful torpedo attack, Worcester was hit by 11-inch (280-mm) shells from the battlecruisers and 8-inch (203-mm) shells from Prinz Eugen, suffering 26 killed or mortally wounded and 45 injured. Most of the dead are buried side by side at Shotley Naval Cemetery, opposite Worcester's Harwich moorings. The German gunfire inflicted severe structural damage on Worcester, starting fires, flooding her No. 1 boiler room, and causing her to go dead in the water. Her surviving crew managed to put out her fires, get back underway, and proceed to Parkeston Quay (Harwich) for repairs without the aid of tugs.

Nominated for conversion to a Short-Range Escort, Worcester was under repair and conversion until August 1942. Returning to service in September 1942, she was assigned to the Home Fleet at Scapa Flow in the Orkney Islands to support Arctic convoys during their voyages between the United Kingdom and the Kola Inlet in the Soviet Union. On 16 September, she deployed with Venomous, the destroyers HMS Amazon, HMS Bulldog, HMS Echo and HMS Windsor, and the escort destroyer HMS Cowdray for Operation Gearbox, in which the ships established a refuelling base at Lowe Sound on Spitsbergen for Allied escort ships on the Arctic run. With the base established, Worcester departed Lowe Sound on 20 September with the destroyers HMS Fury and HMS Impulsive and the Royal Fleet Auxiliary oiler RFA Oligarch to join Convoy QP 14 during its voyage from the Kola Inlet to Loch Ewe, Scotland. She detached from QP 14 on 26 September.

Worcester remained with the Home Fleet through December 1942. That month, she deployed with Montrose and the destroyers HMS Musketeer and HMS Raider, the Royal Australian Navy destroyer HMAS Queenborough, and the Polish Navy destroyer ORP Piorun as the screen for the battleships HMS King George V and HMS Howe and the light cruiser HMS Bermuda as they provided cover for Convoy RA 51 as it steamed from the Kola Inlet to the United Kingdom in case German heavy warships attempted to interfere in its passage.

==== 1943–45 ====
In January 1943, Worcester was released from duty with the Home Fleet. She returned to the 16th Destroyer Flotilla at Harwich and in February 1943 resumed operations in the North Sea, escorting convoys and conducting interception patrols targeting German E-boats before they could launch attacks against Allied convoys. On 24 October 1943, she deployed off Norfolk, England, with Mackay and small craft of the Royal Navy Coastal Forces to intercept E-boats thought to be gathering for an attack on Convoys FN 1160 and FS 1164, steaming northbound and southbound, respectively, in the North Sea along the east coast of Great Britain. Worcester, Mackay, and the Coastal Forces craft engaged E-boats of the German 4th Torpedo Boat Flotilla on 25 October 1943 off Cromer, preventing them from attacking the convoys; four of the E-boats did not return to base at IJmuiden in the Netherlands.

Worcester continued her escort and interception operations until 23 December 1943 when she detonated a mine in the North Sea near Smith's Knoll. The mine destroyed her stern structure, and she was towed to Great Yarmouth. She was under repair and survey until April 1944, when she was deemed beyond economical repair and was decommissioned.

In May 1944, Worcester was selected for use as an accommodation ship in London upon completion of repairs and modification for her new role. In January 1945 she was towed to London, and after local preparation for use as an accommodation ship, was recommissioned with the new name HMS Yeoman, the second Royal Navy ship of the name, in June 1945. She remained in service as such after the surrender of Japan brought World War II to an end in August 1945.

== Decommissioning and disposal ==
Yeoman remained in use as an accommodation ship until placed on the disposal list in 1946. She was sold for scrapping on 17 September 1946 to the British Iron & Steel Corporation (BISCO), which allocated her to Thos. W. Ward to be broken up. She was towed to the shipbreaker's yard at Grays, Essex, England, in February 1947.

== Bibliography ==
- Cernuschi, Enrico & Grobmeier, Alvin H. (1999). "Question 5/98: Damage to British destroyer Campbell". Warship International. XXXVI (2): 194–195. ISSN 0043-0374.
- Chesneau, Roger, ed. (1980). Conway's All the World's Fighting Ships 1922–1946. Greenwich, UK: Conway Maritime Press. ISBN 0-85177-146-7.
- Colledge, J. J.; Warlow, Ben (2006) [1969]. Ships of the Royal Navy: The Complete Record of All Fighting Ships of the Royal Navy from the 15th Century to the Present (3rd Rev ed.). London: Chatham Publishing. ISBN 978-1-86176-281-8. OCLC 67375475.
- Cocker, Maurice. Destroyers of the Royal Navy, 1893–1981. Ian Allan. ISBN 0-7110-1075-7.
- Friedman, Norman (2009). British Destroyers From Earliest Days to the Second World War. Annapolis, Maryland: Naval Institute Press. ISBN 978-1-59114-081-8.
- Gardiner, Robert & Gray, Randal, eds. (1985). Conway's All the World's Fighting Ships 1906–1921. Annapolis, Maryland: Naval Institute Press. ISBN 0-85177-245-5.
- Lenton, H. T. (1998). British & Empire Warships of the Second World War. Annapolis, Maryland: Naval Institute Press. ISBN 1-55750-048-7.
- March, Edgar J. (1966). British Destroyers: A History of Development, 1892–1953; Drawn by Admiralty Permission From Official Records & Returns, Ships' Covers & Building Plans. London: Seeley Service. OCLC 164893555.
- Preston, Antony (1971). 'V & W' Class Destroyers 1917–1945. London: Macdonald. OCLC 464542895.
- Raven, Alan & Roberts, John (1979). 'V' and 'W' Class Destroyers. Man o'War. Vol. 2. London: Arms & Armour. ISBN 0-85368-233-X.
- Rohwer, Jürgen (2005). Chronology of the War at Sea 1939–1945: The Naval History of World War Two (Third Revised ed.). Annapolis, Maryland: Naval Institute Press. ISBN 1-59114-119-2.
- Whinney, Bob (2000). The U-boat Peril: A Fight for Survival. Cassell. ISBN 0-304-35132-6.
- Whitley, M. J. (1988). Destroyers of World War 2. Annapolis, Maryland: Naval Institute Press. ISBN 0-87021-326-1.
- Winser, John de D. (1999). B.E.F. Ships Before, At and After Dunkirk. Gravesend, Kent: World Ship Society. ISBN 0-905617-91-6.
