= Madeleine Barclay =

French espionage agent

- Born: 21 February 1911; Paris, France
- Died: 1 January 1943 (aged 31); HMS Fidelity, North Atlantic Ocean, off Azores
- Military career
- Allegiance: France; United Kingdom
- Branch: Special Operations Executive, WRNS
- Service years: 1941-1943
- Rank: First Officer
- Unit: HMS Fidelity

First Officer Madeleine Victorine Bayard (21 February 1911 — 1 January 1943), who served as Madeleine Barclay aboard HMS Fidelity on agent-running operations into Vichy France, was a French agent of the Special Operations Executive during World War II. She was lost, with the rest of the crew, when the ship was sunk in 1943.

== Biography ==
Madeleine Victorine Bayard was born in Paris in 1911, the daughter of Adele Suzanne Bayard (father unknown). There are also references to Madeleine Guesclin, a play on her surname as both du Guesclin and Bayard were famous warriors in medieval France. She served on the French merchant vessel Le Rhin. After the fall of France, in 1940, the ship escaped to Britain and was accepted for service with SOE. The ship was therefore re-commissioned as HMS Fidelity and the French crew inducted into the Royal Navy. Because members of the crew had families in occupied Europe they adopted pseudonyms, thus Madeleine Barclay. Barclay was the mistress of Fidelity's commanding officer, Claude Andre Michel Peri (Jack Langlais), whom she had met in French Indo-China.

Bayard was commissioned into the "Wrens", the Women's Royal Naval Service, (WRNS) becoming a First Officer (equivalent to a Lieutenant commander). She attended her WRNS Officers' Training Course at the Royal Naval College, Greenwich in January 1941, before rejoining her ship on operations for SOE. At the time, it was extremely rare for a Wren, whether rating or officer, to serve afloat.

In November 1942, the Allies landed in French North Africa and the Germans occupied Vichy France as a precaution. It was no longer appropriate to continue the operations to this part of France. However, a new role was considered for HMS Fidelity in the Far East. Large enough to carry her own motor torpedo boats (MTBs) and spotter aircraft, she was ideal as an offshore base to mount Commando operations on Japanese-held coasts in South-East Asia. A company (in reality, more a Troop) of 40(RM) Commando was embarked and Fidelity set off on her new mission, joining a convoy for the dangerous initial part of the voyage through the North Atlantic.

Off the Azores, Fidelity was damaged by an attack from U-615, then sunk by U-435 around 1 January 1943. There were reports of survivors of the sinking, but Fidelity had herself been rescuing other survivors and was far behind the convoy. A detached Motor Torpedo Boat reached safety, but otherwise all hands were lost.

A biography Claude and Madeleine: A True Story of War, Espionage and Passion by Edward Marriott was published in 2005.

== Awards ==

1939–1945 Star	France and Germany Star	War Medal 1939–1945
