= RFA Gray Ranger =

1941 Ranger-class fleet support tanker of the Royal Fleet Auxiliary

Coordinates: 70°N 11°W

History

United Kingdom
- Name: Gray Ranger
- Ordered: 28 August 1939
- Builder: Caledon Shipbuilding & Engineering Company
- Laid down: 28 June 1940
- Launched: 27 May 1941
- Commissioned: 25 September 1941
- Fate: Sunk, 22 September 1942

General characteristics
- Class & type: Ranger-class fleet support tanker
- Displacement: 6,700 long tons (6,808 t) full load
- Length: 365 ft 4 in (111.35 m)
- Beam: 47 ft (14 m)
- Draught: 22 ft 2 in (6.76 m)
- Propulsion: 1 × 4-cylinder Doxford diesel; 2,800 shp (2,100 kW); 1 shaft
- Speed: 13 knots (15 mph; 24 km/h)
- Range: 6,000 nmi (11,000 km) at 13 kn (15 mph; 24 km/h)
- Complement: 40

RFA Gray Ranger was a British fleet support tanker of the Royal Fleet Auxiliary which served in World War II. She was torpedoed and sunk in the Greenland Sea by the German submarine U-435 on 22 September 1942 while travelling as part of Convoy QP 14.
