= Deluge (fireboat, 1911) =

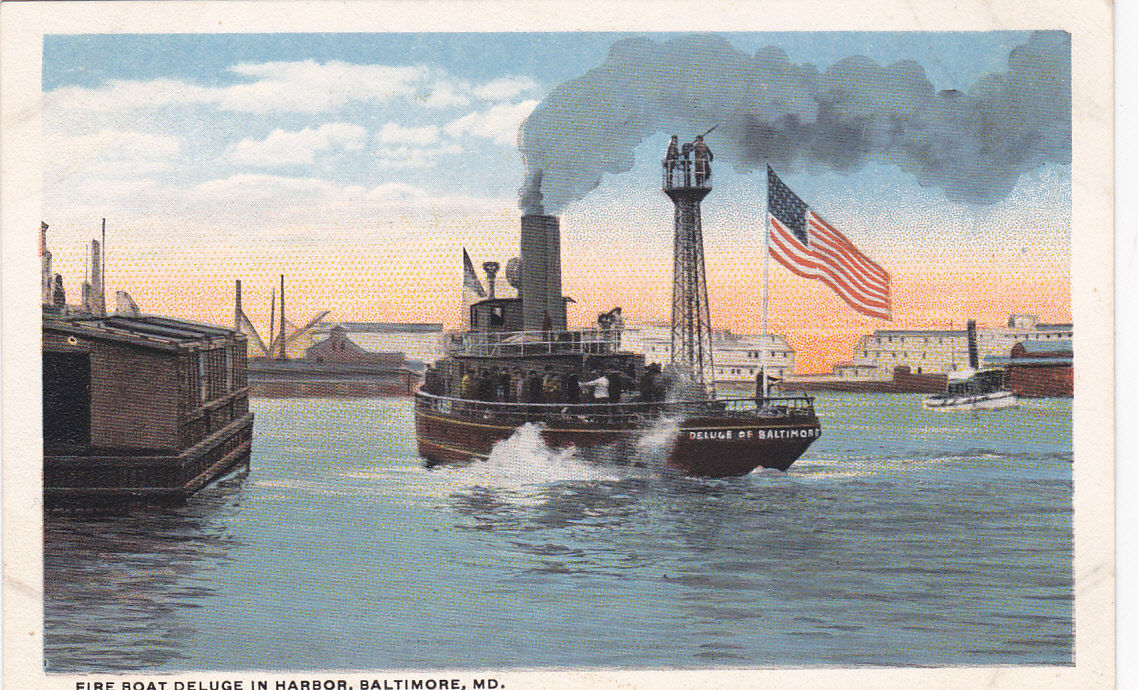
Baltimore's fireboat Deluge

The Deluge was a fireboat operated, for decades, in Baltimore, Maryland. When built, in 1911, her capacity to pump 12,000 gallons per minute made her one of the most powerful fireboats. (Note: Some 21st Century fireboats can pump around 50,000 gallons per minute, four times as much water.)

In 1917 the Deluge played a key role in fighting a fire at Baltimore's historic Pier 9, that spread to the British freighter Kerry Range She helped fight another fire, in 1917, near a munition plant.
