= HMS Fidelity =

Special Service Vessel of the British Royal Navy during World War II

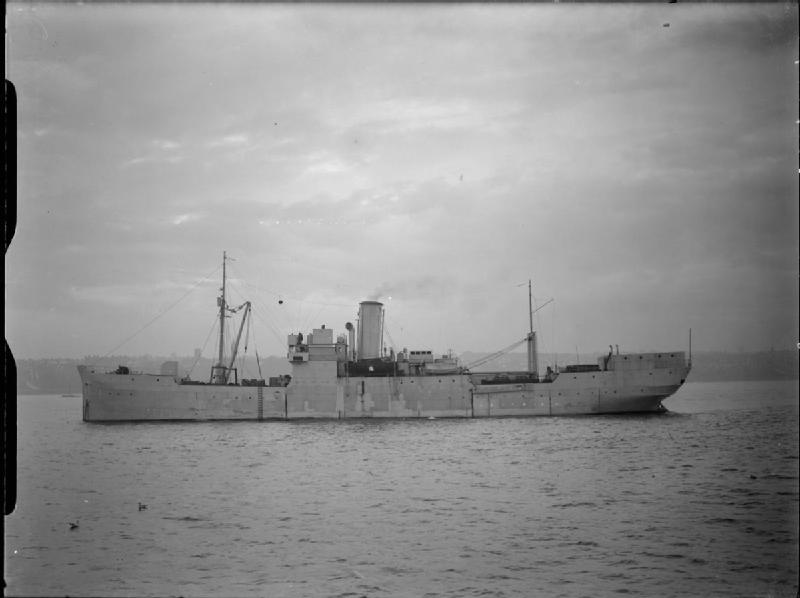

History

United Kingdom
- Name: HMS Fidelity
- Builder: H. & C. Grayson Ltd., Garston, Liverpool
- Launched: 23 February 1920
- Completed: 1920
- Commissioned: 24 September 1940
- Fate: Sunk, 30 December 1942

General characteristics
- Type: Special Service Vessel
- Tonnage: 2,356 GRT
- Length: 80.7 m (264 ft 9 in)
- Beam: 12.6 m (41 ft 4 in)
- Depth: 5.7 m (18 ft 8 in)
- Propulsion: 252 nhp triple expansion steam engine
- Speed: 10.5 knots (19.4 km/h; 12.1 mph)
- Boats & landing craft carried: 1 × Motor Torpedo Boat; 2 × Landing Craft
- Complement: 280
- Armament: 4 × 4 in (100 mm) guns; 4 × torpedo tubes
- Aircraft carried: 2 × OS2U Kingfisher floatplanes

HMS Fidelity was a Special Service Vessel of the British Royal Navy during World War II, originally the French merchant vessel Le Rhin.

== Background ==
The 2,456-ton ship was built by H. & C. Grayson Ltd. of Garston, Liverpool, and completed in 1920 for Compagnie de Navigation Paquet, Marseille.

In June 1940 Le Rhin was seized by Lieutenant de Vaisseau Claude Andre Michel Peri at Marseille and sailed for Gibraltar. Peri and his crew wished to continue the fight after the Fall of France and Le Rhin was turned over to the Royal Navy at Barry, Wales. The ship was converted into an auxiliary warship, and commissioned on 24 September 1940 as HMS Fidelity under the command of Lt. Peri, serving as Lieutenant Commander Jack Langlais RNVR. Her officers included Lt-Cmdr. Albert Guérisse serving as Patrick Albert O'Leary RNVR, and First Officer Madeleine Bayard serving as Madeleine Barclay WRNS. Because they had families in occupied Europe crew members were serving under pseudonyms. Bayard was Peri's mistress and one of very few women to be a commissioned officer on a Royal Navy ship.

Fidelity was classified as a "Special Service Vessel", a catch-all designation for vessels that don't fit easily into any other group. In the First World War submarine decoy vessels ("Q-ships") were classed as SSVs, which has led some authors to refer to Fidelity as a Q-ship, but the terms are not synonymous, and there is no evidence she was ever employed as a submarine decoy ship.

== Service history ==
In 1941 Fidelity operated off the coast of Southern France as a clandestine transport under the direction of the Special Operations Executive (SOE), landing agents and picking up escaped prisoners, disguised as Spanish or Portuguese freighters. She also took part in small-scale sabotage operations.

In 1942 Fidelity was refitted to operate as a commando carrier for operations in south-east Asia. She was armed with four 4-inch guns, four 21-inch torpedo tubes, and carried two OS2U Kingfisher floatplanes, the motor torpedo boat MTB-105, and the landing craft LCV-752 and LCV-754.

== Fate ==
In December 1942 Fidelity, with T Company, 40 Commando aboard, joined Convoy ON 154 for passage to the Far East. The convoy was attacked by U-boats from 27 December while north of the Azores. On 29 December Fidelity, suffering from engine problems, fell out of the convoy. She launched her aircraft as an anti-submarine patrol while repairs took place. During this time her aircraft reported lifeboats to the southwest and her landing craft was sent to pick them up. These were 44 men from Empire Shackleton, the convoy commodore's ship. During the night Fidelity was making 5 knots towards the Azores, but came under attack twice. She was fired on by U-225, and later by U-615. Both U-boats were driven off when Fidelity fired back. On 30 December she was found by U-435, under the command of Siegfried Strelow at position 43°23′N 27°07′W and was torpedoed twice. Strelow observed the sinking, and estimated about 300 survivors in the water, but when he made his report later he was asked "whether their destruction in the prevailing weather can be counted on". This was some months after BdU's infamous Laconia Order, instructing U-boat commanders not to assist survivors in any way, and regarded at the Nuremberg trials as a tacit encouragement to ensure there were none. At the time of her sinking Fidelity had on board some 369 souls (274 crew, 51 Marines and 44 survivors from Empire Shackleton): All were lost. The only survivors were the eight crew of the motor torpedo boat, detached on anti-submarine patrol, who were later picked up by HMCS Woodstock, and two crewmen of a seaplane that had crashed on take-off on 28 December and been picked up by HMCS St. Laurent. To this day 40 Commando has never reused T as a company designation in memory of the loss.

Guérisse was not aboard when Fidelity sank, having earlier been stranded in France. He became the namesake of the Pat O'Leary escape line which helped more than 650 allied soldiers and downed airmen escape occupied France. A memorial to the men of T Company is located in the Parish Church of St Andrew, Chale, Isle of Wight, near where their training took place.
