= SS Kerry Range =

General cargo freighter

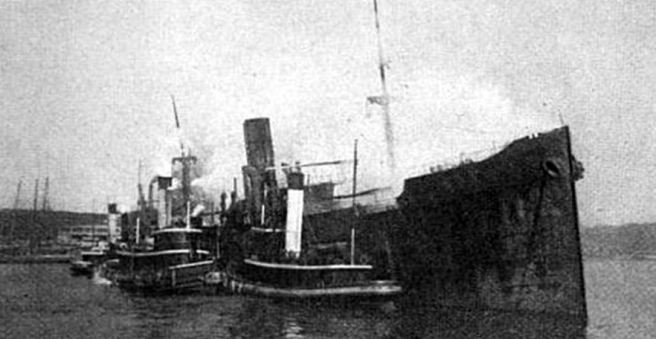
- SS Kerry Range, scuttled in Baltimore, 1917

History
- Name: Kerry Range (1917–1920); Blossom Heath (1920–1925); Vojvoda Putnik (1925–1943)
- Owner: Neptune SN Co Ltd (Furness, Withy & Co Ltd), Liverpool (1916–1918); Steam Navigation Co of Canada Ltd, Montreal (1918–1925); Jugoslovensko Amerikaniska Plovidba, Dubrovnik (1925–1928); Jugoslavenski Lloyd, Dubrovnik (1928–1943)
- Port of registry: (United Kingdom) (1916–1920); (Socialist Federal Republic of Yugoslavia) (1920–1943)
- Builder: Northumberland Shipbuilding Company, Howden
- Yard number: 225
- Launched: 27 November 1915
- Completed: February 1916
- Identification: United Kingdom Official Number 137494
- Fate: Sunk 8 March 1943, 58°42′N 31°25′W

General characteristics
- Type: Cargo ship
- Tonnage: 5,856 GRT
- Length: 400 feet (120 m)
- Beam: 52 feet (16 m)
- Height: 35.4 feet (10.8 m)
- Installed power: Steam engine
- Propulsion: Screw propeller

The steamship Kerry Range was a 5,800-ton general cargo freighter, armed with 4.7-inch (119 mm) guns, that had been built by the Northumberland Shipbuilding Company and launched on 27 November 1915. While serving as a Royal Navy armed transport she was damaged in a fire, with loss of life, in Baltimore, Maryland, in October 1917. Investigating officials, after the fire, were convinced the vessel was the target of arson, and that the arsonists were German agents—an enemy of the United Kingdom and the United States, during World War I. Several suspects were arrested. However, it was later determined that the fire on Pier 9, that triggered the fire on board Kerry Range, was due to an electrical malfunction that triggered oakum, a flammable product once used to pack seams on ships. Three crew members lost their lives. Firefighting officials towed the blazing vessel away from the pier, to help prevent it igniting nearby Pier 8, and scuttled her. It took over a day to completely put out the fires on the hulk. Some press reports at the time wrote she was a complete write-off. However, the damaged vessel was salvaged and sold to the Steam Navigation Company of Canada in 1918.

The fireboats Deluge and Cataract played a key role in fighting the 1917 blaze.

In 1920, the ship's Canadian owners renamed her Blossom Heath, and in 1925 she was sold to the Dubrovnik-based Yugoslavian company Yugoslavenska Americaniska Plovidba ad. The Yugoslav owners renamed the ship Vojvoda Putnik. Three years later she was sold on to Yugoslavenski Lloyd dd, also based in Dubrovnik. Vojvoda Putnik stayed in Yugoslav service until torpedoed and sunk during World War II by the German U-boat U-591 in the Atlantic Ocean (58°42′N 31°25′W) on 8 March 1943.
