= Jack Langlais =

Former French naval officer

Jack Langlais was the nom de guerre of former French naval officer Claude Andre Michel Peri during the Second World War. Langlais was the leader of an independent group of displaced Frenchmen, operating the armed merchant vessel HMS Fidelity in collaboration with the Special Operations Executive. Langlais and his crew died in December 1942 when Fidleity was sunk en route to the Far East.

== Early life ==
Claude Peri was born on 7 April 1906 in Hanoi, French Indochina, the son of Francois Michel Peri, a French colonial officer. Peri was educated in Hanoi at the College Paul Bert, and the Lycée Albert Sarraut. In 1925 joined the Fr Navy and served briefly in submarines before being discharged on medical grounds Returning to Indo-China Peri worked as an insurance broker, and as an organizer of big-game hunts. He was also recruited for the local branch of the Deuxieme Bureau, the French Intelligence service. It was during this period he met Madeleine Bayard, who became his companion and comrade-in-arms.

== Service career ==
At the outbreak of the Second World War Peri reported to metropolitan France for service; his first assignment was to organize an attack on the German freighter Corrientes, moored at Las Palmas in the Canary Islands, which was being used to re-fuel and re-equip raiding U-boats. To achieve his Peri commandeered a freighter, Le Rhin, in Marseille, and used her to put into Las Palmas, from where he mounted an underwater attack on Corrientes, attaching limpet mines which disabled the ship.

With the Fall of France Peri sailed Le Rhin to Gibraltar, after seizing whatever goods he could find at Marseille, where he offered his services to the Royal Navy, He proclaimed he had no further involvement with France, which he regarded as dishonoured for surrendering. Using the sale of his cargo he had Le Rhin outfitted as an armed merchantman, and renamed her HMS Fidelity. He himself adopted the nom de guerre Jack Langlais; his companions did likewise, Albert Guérisse becoming Pat O’Leary, and Madeleine Bayard becoming Madeleine Barclay. Under the auspices of the SOE Langlais and Fidelity undertook two clandestine missions in 1941 to land SOE agents in the south of France and to collect escaped Prisoners of War. During the first mission O’Leary became cut off in France, and rose to command one of the most important escape lines for POWs, the Pat O'Leary Line. In 1942 Langlais persuaded the Allied Combined Ops to employ Fidelity as a depot ship for a Marine Commando raiding party. Langlais, with Fidelity’s crew and T troop, 40 Commando spent the summer training for this role, which was to be in the Far East, while Fidelity was re-fitted. However, in December 1942, while in transit to the Far East, Fidelity was sunk in the North Atlantic while sailing with convoy ON 154. Fidelity had fallen out of convoy and came under attack by several U-boats. She was torpedoed and sunk, and all on board were lost.

== Personal life ==
In 1935 Peri married Raymonde Fouche, but their relationship cooled; In 1938 Peri fathered a child for his mistress, Marguerite Paire, with a Vietnamese woman, Do Tikem. The baby, his son Andre, was passed to Marguerite (who was unable to have children) soon after his birth, and she brought him up as her own. In 1940, before Peri left for France (and being not yet divorced from Raymonde) he married Marguerite, to secure her title over Andre. The main relationship of his life however, was with Madeleine Bayard, whom he first met in 1935, and who from 1938 was his constant companion and partner-in-arms.
