= RFA Blue Ranger =

1941 Ranger-class fleet support tanker of the Royal Fleet Auxiliary

History

United Kingdom
- Name: Blue Ranger
- Ordered: 28 August 1939
- Builder: Harland & Wolff
- Yard number: 1047
- Laid down: 26 October 1939
- Launched: 29 January 1941
- Completed: 6 June 1941
- Commissioned: 5 June 1941
- Decommissioned: June 1966; Laid up at Devonport
- Stricken: 1975
- Identification: IMO number: 5046786
- Fate: Sold commercially in January 1972 and renamed Korytsa; Arrived Aliaga for demolition, 8 September 1987

General characteristics
- Class & type: Ranger-class fleet support tanker
- Displacement: 6,700 long tons (6,808 t) full load
- Length: 365 ft 10 in (111.51 m)
- Beam: 47 ft (14 m)
- Draught: 20 ft 2 in (6.15 m)
- Propulsion: 1 × 6-cylinder B&W diesel; 3,500 shp (2,600 kW); 1 shaft
- Speed: 13 knots (15 mph; 24 km/h)
- Range: 6,000 nmi (11,000 km) at 13 kn (15 mph; 24 km/h)
- Complement: 40

RFA Blue Ranger (A157) was a Ranger-class fleet support tanker of the Royal Fleet Auxiliary. She was launched by Harland & Wolff from their Govan yard on 29 January 1941 and served until June 1966 when she was laid up in reserve at Devonport. In January 1972 she was sold commercially and renamed Korytsa. The ship was scrapped at Aliaga in September 1987.
