= German submarine U-435 =

German World War II submarine

History

Nazi Germany
- Name: U-435
- Ordered: 16 October 1939
- Builder: F Schichau GmbH, Danzig
- Yard number: 1477
- Laid down: 11 April 1940
- Launched: 31 May 1941
- Commissioned: 30 August 1941
- Fate: Sunk by depth charges on 9 July 1943 west of Figueira, Portugal at position 39°48′N 14°22′W by an RAF Wellington bomber of 179 Squadron operating out of Gibraltar.

General characteristics
- Class & type: Type VIIC submarine
- Displacement: 769 tonnes (757 long tons) surfaced; 871 t (857 long tons) submerged
- Length: 67.10 m (220 ft 2 in) o/a; 50.50 m (165 ft 8 in) pressure hull
- Beam: 6.20 m (20 ft 4 in) o/a; 4.70 m (15 ft 5 in) pressure hull
- Height: 9.60 m (31 ft 6 in)
- Draught: 4.74 m (15 ft 7 in)
- Installed power: 2,800–3,200 PS (2,100–2,400 kW; 2,800–3,200 bhp) (diesels); 750 PS (550 kW; 740 shp) (electric)
- Propulsion: 2 shafts; 2 × diesel engines; 2 × electric motors
- Speed: 17.7 knots (32.8 km/h; 20.4 mph) surfaced; 7.6 knots (14.1 km/h; 8.7 mph) submerged
- Range: 8,500 nmi (15,700 km; 9,800 mi) at 10 knots (19 km/h; 12 mph) surfaced; 80 nmi (150 km; 92 mi) at 4 knots (7.4 km/h; 4.6 mph) submerged
- Test depth: 230 m (750 ft); Crush depth: 250–295 m (820–968 ft)
- Complement: 4 officers, 40–56 enlisted
- Armament: 5 × 53.3 cm (21 in) torpedo tubes; 14 × torpedoes; 1 × 2 cm (0.79 in) C/30 anti-aircraft gun

Service record
- Part of: 5th U-boat Flotilla; 30 August – 31 December 1941; 1st U-boat Flotilla; 1 January – 30 June 1942; 11th U-boat Flotilla; 1 July 1942 – 31 January 1943; 1st U-boat Flotilla; 1 February – 9 July 1943
- Identification codes: M 03 593
- Commanders: K.Kapt. Siegfried Strelow; 30 August 1941 – 9 July 1943
- Operations: 8 patrols: 1st patrol: a. 20 January – 16 February 1942; b. 18 – 22 February 1942; 2nd patrol: 16 March – 5 April 1942; 3rd patrol: a. 7 – 26 April 1942; b. 18 – 20 June 1942; c. 25 – 26 June 1942; d. 18 – 25 July 1942; 4th patrol: 25 July – 31 August 1942; 5th patrol: a. 16 – 28 September 1942; b. 30 September – 3 October 1942; 6th patrol: 30 November 1942 – 10 January 1943; 7th patrol: 18 February – 25 March 1943; 8th patrol: 20 May – 9 July 1943
- Victories: 9 merchant ships sunk (53,712 GRT); 3 warships sunk (855 tons); 1 auxiliary warship sunk (2,456 GRT)

German submarine U-435 was a Type VIIC U-boat built for Nazi Germany's Kriegsmarine for service during World War II. She was laid down on 11 April 1940 by F Schichau GmbH in Danzig as yard number 1477, launched on 31 May 1941 and commissioned on 30 August 1941 under Korvettenkapitän Siegfried Strelow (Knight's Cross).

The boat's service began on 30 August 1941 with training as part of the 5th U-boat Flotilla. She was transferred to the 1st flotilla on 1 January 1942 for active service and then to the 11th flotilla on 1 July 1942. She returned to the 1st flotilla on 1 February 1943.

== Design ==
German Type VIIC submarines were preceded by the shorter Type VIIB submarines. U-435 had a displacement of 769 tonnes (757 long tons) when at the surface and 871 tonnes (857 long tons) while submerged. She had a total length of 67.10 m (220 ft 2 in), a pressure hull length of 50.50 m (165 ft 8 in), a beam of 6.20 m (20 ft 4 in), a height of 9.60 m (31 ft 6 in), and a draught of 4.74 m (15 ft 7 in). The submarine was powered by two Germaniawerft F46 four-stroke, six-cylinder supercharged diesel engines producing a total of 2,800 to 3,200 metric horsepower (2,060 to 2,350 kW; 2,760 to 3,160 shp) for use while surfaced, two AEG GU 460/8–27 double-acting electric motors producing a total of 750 metric horsepower (550 kW; 740 shp) for use while submerged. She had two shafts and two 1.23 m (4 ft) propellers. The boat was capable of operating at depths of up to 230 metres (750 ft).

The submarine had a maximum surface speed of 17.7 knots (32.8 km/h; 20.4 mph) and a maximum submerged speed of 7.6 knots (14.1 km/h; 8.7 mph). When submerged, the boat could operate for 80 nautical miles (150 km; 92 mi) at 4 knots (7.4 km/h; 4.6 mph); when surfaced, she could travel 8,500 nautical miles (15,700 km; 9,800 mi) at 10 knots (19 km/h; 12 mph). U-435 was fitted with five 53.3 cm (21 in) torpedo tubes (four fitted at the bow and one at the stern), fourteen torpedoes, one 8.8 cm (3.46 in) SK C/35 naval gun, 220 rounds, and a 2 cm (0.79 in) C/30 anti-aircraft gun. The boat had a complement of between forty-four and sixty.

== Service history ==
In eight patrols she sank nine merchant ships, plus three warships and one auxiliary warship for a total of 56,168 GRT and 855 tons.

Convoy PQ 13

U-456 attacked and damaged the American freighter Effingham straggling the convoy. U-435 then finished off the abandoned vessel.

Convoy QP 10

U-435 was more successful in April sinking both the Panamanian freighter El Occidente and British steamer Harpalion. The straggler Harpalion was finished off after being abandoned having been previously heavily damaged by Luftwaffe Ju 88 dive bombers.

Convoy QP 14

U-435 had even more success when she was part of a combined attack on Arctic Convoy QP 14. She sank 4 vessels, comprising the minesweeper HMS Leda, RFA fleet oiler Gray Ranger, British Liberty ship Ocean Voice and American freighter Bellingham.

Convoy ONS 154

U-435 continued her earlier successes sinking 3 vessels from ONS 154, the CAM ship Empire Shackleton, the freighter Norse King, the special service vessel HMS Fidelity: She was also credited with two landing craft carried on Fidelity when she was sunk.

=== Wolfpacks ===
She took part in eleven wolfpacks, namely:

- Hecht (27 January – 4 February 1942)
- Umbau (4 – 16 February 1942)
- Eiswolf (28 – 31 March 1942)
- Robbenschlag (7 – 13 April 1942)
- Nebelkönig (27 July – 14 August 1942)
- Ungestüm (11 – 30 December 1942)
- Burggraf (24 February – 5 March 1943)
- Raubgraf (7 – 19 March 1943)
- Trutz (1 – 16 June 1943)
- Trutz 3 (16 – 29 June 1942)
- Geier 2 (30 June – 9 July 1943)

=== Fate ===
She was depth charged and sunk on 9 July 1943 at position 39°48′N 14°22′W west of Figueira, Portugal by an RAF Wellington bomber from 179 Squadron.

== Summary of raiding history ==
Raiding record (Note: Merchant ship tonnages are in gross register tons. Military vessels are listed by tons displacement.)
Date	Name	Flag	GRT	Fate
30 March 1942	Effingham	United States	6,421	Sunk
13 April 1942	El Occidente	Panama	6,008	Sunk
13 April 1942	Harpalion	United Kingdom	5,486	Sunk
20 September 1942	HMS Leda	Royal Navy	835	Sunk
22 September 1942	Bellingham	United Kingdom	5,345	Sunk
22 September 1942	RFA Gray Ranger	Royal Fleet Auxiliary	3,313	Sunk
22 September 1942	Ocean Voice	United Kingdom	7,174	Sunk
29 December 1942	Empire Shackleton	United Kingdom	7,068	Sunk
29 December 1942	Norse King	Norway	5,701	Sunk
30 December 1942	HMS Fidelity	Royal Navy	2,456	Sunk
30 December 1942	HMS LCV-752	Royal Navy	10 (Note: Carried by HMS Fidelity)	Sunk
30 December 1942	HMS LCV-754	Royal Navy	10	Sunk
17 March 1943	William Eustis	United States	7,196	Sunk

== Bibliography ==
- Busch, Rainer; Röll, Hans-Joachim (1999). German U-boat commanders of World War II : a biographical dictionary. Translated by Brooks, Geoffrey. London, Annapolis, Md: Greenhill Books, Naval Institute Press. ISBN 1-55750-186-6.
- Busch, Rainer; Röll, Hans-Joachim (1999). Deutsche U-Boot-Verluste von September 1939 bis Mai 1945 [German U-boat losses from September 1939 to May 1945]. Der U-Boot-Krieg (in German). Vol. IV. Hamburg, Berlin, Bonn: Mittler. ISBN 3-8132-0514-2.
- Gröner, Erich; Jung, Dieter; Maass, Martin (1991). U-boats and Mine Warfare Vessels. German Warships 1815–1945. Vol. 2. Translated by Thomas, Keith; Magowan, Rachel. London: Conway Maritime Press. ISBN 0-85177-593-4.
- Edwards, Bernard (1996). Dönitz and the Wolf Packs – The U-Boats at War. London, UK: Cassell Military Classics. pp. 138, 139. ISBN 0-304-35203-9.
