= HMS Cowdray =

Destroyer of the Royal Navy

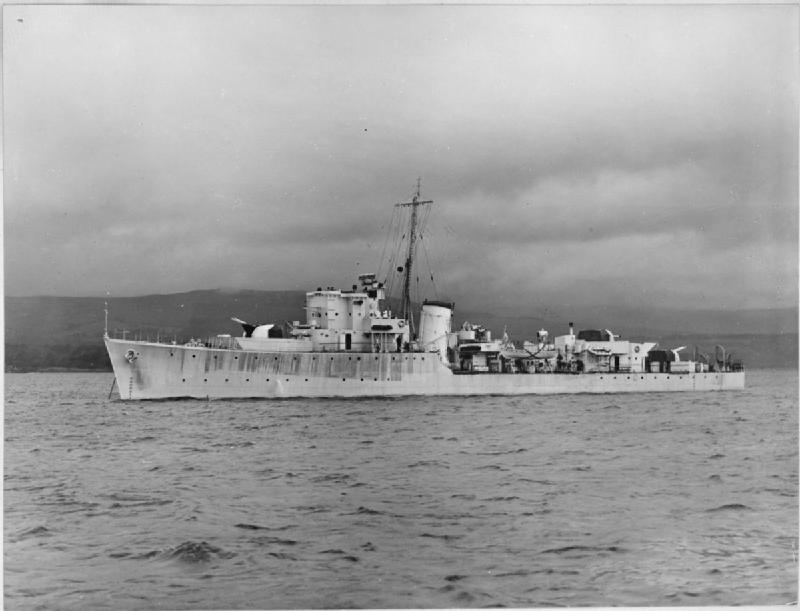
- HMS Cowdray, July 1942 (IWM)

History

United Kingdom
- Name: HMS Cowdray
- Ordered: 4 September 1939
- Builder: Scotts Shipbuilding and Engineering Company, Greenock, Scotland
- Laid down: 30 April 1940
- Launched: 22 July 1941
- Completed: 29 July 1942
- Decommissioned: January 1950
- Identification: Pennant number:L52
- Honours and awards: Arctic 1942; North Africa 1943; Atlantic 1943; English Channel 1944; North Sea 1944-45
- Fate: Scrapped, 1959
- Badge: On a Field, Gold, in front of a horseshoe inverted, a spear erect black within the horseshoe and in front of the spear, a sun in splendour Red.

General characteristics
- Class & type: Type II Hunt-class destroyer
- Displacement: 1,050 long tons (1,070 t) standard; 1,430 long tons (1,450 t) full load
- Length: 85.3 m (279 ft 10 in) o/a
- Beam: 9.6 m (31 ft 6 in)
- Draught: 2.51 m (8 ft 3 in)
- Propulsion: 2 Admiralty 3-drum boilers; 2 shaft Parsons geared turbines, 19,000 shp (14,000 kW)
- Speed: 27 knots (31 mph; 50 km/h); 25.5 kn (29.3 mph; 47.2 km/h) full
- Range: 3,600 nmi (6,700 km) at 14 kn (26 km/h)
- Complement: 164
- Armament: 6 × QF 4 in Mark XVI guns on twin mounts Mk. XIX; 4 × QF 2 pdr Mk. VIII on quad mount MK.VII; 2 × 20 mm Oerlikons on single mounts P Mk. III; 110 depth charges, 2 throwers, 3 racks

HMS Cowdray was a Type II Hunt-class destroyer of the Royal Navy which served in World War II. She has been the only Royal Navy ship to bear the name. She was scrapped in 1959.

== Service history ==
Cowdray was ordered on 4 September 1939 under the 1939 War Emergency Build Programme as job number J1116. She was completed on 29 July 1942 and adopted by the town of Chichester, West Sussex, as part of Warship Week in 1942.

On 8 November 1942 she sustained extensive damage during service in the Mediterranean. Repairs took most of 1943 and 1944. As a result, she only saw a total of three months active service during the Second World War. She earned battle honours during the Second World War for service on the Arctic Convoys, Atlantic, North Sea, North Africa and the English Channel. In mid-1945 she was prepared for service in the Far East, but only completed a few weeks in the East Indies before returning to the UK in November 1945.

On 5 December 1945 she arrived at Chatham for service with the Nore Local Flotilla. She then transferred to the Reserve Fleet at Chatham in January 1950. She was then moved to Portsmouth in 1953 and laid up. She was then sold to BISCO for scrap. She arrived at the breakers yard of JJ King at Sunderland on 3 September 1959.

== Publications ==
- Colledge, J. J.; Warlow, Ben (2006) [1969]. Ships of the Royal Navy: The Complete Record of All Fighting Ships of the Royal Navy from the 15th Century to the Present (3rd Rev ed.). London: Chatham Publishing. ISBN 978-1-86176-281-8. OCLC 67375475.
- English, John (1987). The Hunts: A history of the design, development and careers of the 86 destroyers of this class built for the Royal and Allied Navies during World War II. World Ship Society. ISBN 0-905617-44-4.
