= Convoy PQ 18 order of battle =

World War II naval convoy

Convoy PQ 18
- Part of Arctic Convoys of the Second World War
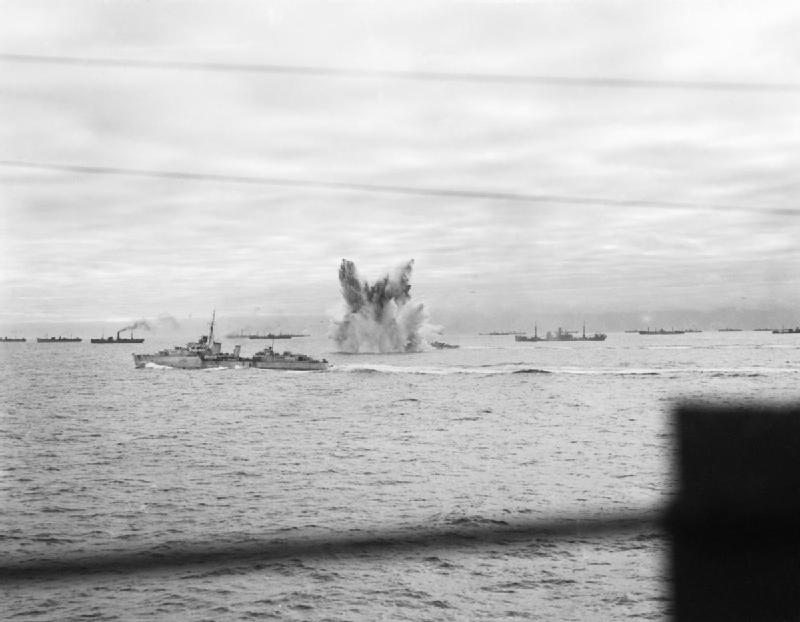
- A depth-charge explosion near Convoy PQ 18
Date	2–21 September 1942
Location	Greenland Sea; Norwegian Sea; Barents Sea; 75°N 40°E
Result	Allied victory

Belligerents
United Kingdom; United States; Soviet Union	Germany

Commanders and leaders
Robert Burnett	Rolf Carls

Strength
40 merchant ships; 40–50 escorts (in relays); 2 submarines; 1 escort carrier; (12 fighters, 3 reconnaissance aircraft)	12 U-boats; 92 torpedo-bombers; 120 bombers; long-range reconnaissance aircraft

Casualties and losses
550+ survivors rescued; 13 merchant ships; 4 Sea Hurricane fighters	4 U-boats; 22–44 aircraft
- A Sea Hurricane was washed overboard

Convoy PQ 18 (2–21 September 1942) was an Arctic convoy of forty Allied freighters from Scotland and Iceland to Arkhangelsk in the Soviet Union, during the Second World War. The convoy departed Loch Ewe, Scotland on 2 September 1942, rendezvoused with more ships and escorts at Iceland and arrived at Arkhangelsk on 21 September. An exceptionally large number of escorts were provided by the Royal Navy in Operation EV, including the first escort carrier to accompany an Arctic convoy. Detailed information on German intentions was provided by the code breakers at Bletchley Park and elsewhere, through Ultra signals decrypts and eavesdropping on Luftwaffe wireless communications. The German B-Dienst code-breakers read some British signals and the Luftwaffe used the lull in convoys after Convoy PQ 17 (27 June – 10 July) to prepare a maximum effort with the Kriegsmarine.

From 12 to 21 September Convoy PQ 18 was attacked by bombers, torpedo-bombers, U-boats and mines, which sank thirteen ships at a cost of 22−44 aircraft and four U-boats. The convoy was defended by escort ships and the aircraft of the escort carrier HMS Avenger which used signals intelligence gleaned from Ultra and Luftwaffe wireless frequencies, to provide early warning of some air attacks and to attempt evasive routeing of the convoy around concentrations of U-boats. United States Navy Armed Guard and British Naval and Royal Artillery Maritime Regiment gunners were embarked on the freighters to operate anti-aircraft guns and barrage balloons, which made air attacks more difficult and because of inexperience, occasionally wounded men and damaged ships and cargo, with wild shooting.

The convoy handed over its distant escorts and Avenger to the homeward bound Convoy QP 14 near Archangelsk on 16 September and continued with the close escort and local escorts, riding out a storm in the Northern Dvina estuary and the last attacks by the Luftwaffe, before reaching Archangelsk on 21 September. Several ships ran aground in the storm but all were eventually refloated; unloading the convoy took a month. Because of its losses and the transfer in November of its most effective remaining aircraft to the Mediterranean to oppose Operation Torch, the Luftwaffe effort could never be repeated.

== Aftermath ==
=== Analysis ===
In the official history (1956 [1962]) Stephen Roskill called Convoy PQ 18 an Allied success. The convoy operation brought 28 ships safely to their destinations and the Arctic convoy route, which had been suspended since the loss of Convoy PQ 17, was open again. In 2001, Werner Rahn wrote that the Seekriegsleitung (SKL, Naval War Staff) had called the results "dearly bought and unsatisfactory". In 2004, Richard Woodman referred to Convoy PQ 18 as a Pyrrhic victory. The Luftwaffe torpedo-bomber attacks, while costly, had been highly effective and would have inflicted more losses had not the British Headache operators not given early warning of some attacks, which enabled Sea Hurricanes to be scrambled in time. The Germans failed to prevent the convoy reaching Russia and their losses, particularly in trained pilots, were severe, reducing the ability of the Luftwaffe to repeat its anti-convoy operation.

Attacks on Avenger had been defeated and the depth of the escort screen made torpedo attacks on the centre of the convoy extravagantly risky. Coastal Command operations in support of Convoy PQ 18 and the returning Convoy QP 14, involved 111 aircraft from 14 squadrons, which flew 279 sorties and logged 2,290 flying hours, most being taken up by the fights to and from the convoy. In November, Luftflotte 5, the German air command in Norway and Finland, was ordered to transfer its Ju 88 and He 111 torpedo-bombers to the Mediterranean against Operation Torch, a decision which the British received through Ultra intercepts. Only the Heinkel He 115 floatplanes, suitable for torpedo attacks on stragglers and some Junkers Ju 87 dive-bombers remained in Norway, along with a few long-range reconnaissance aircraft to observe for the surface and U-boat forces.

=== Casualties ===
Roskill in 1962 and Woodman in 2004 wrote that the Germans managed to sink thirteen merchant ships for a loss of four U-boats and 44 aircraft, 38 of them being torpedo-bombers and six long-range bombers and reconnaissance aircraft. Michael Howard, in 1972, recorded that the Allies lost 38 aircraft from 309, 126 tanks from 448 and 85 of the 106 lorries carried in the merchant ships. Convoy PQ 19 was assembled at Loch Ewe but not dispatched, a net loss to the Allied war effort.

== Allied order of battle ==
=== Cargo ===
Cargo carried in Convoy PQ 18
From	Vehicle	Tank	Aircraft	Expl	Other (LT)
Dispatched
UK: 11	312	230	271	1,601	37,799
US: 16	2,588	384	175	7,297	72,288
Lost
UK: 4	123	89	271	134	10,862
US: 8	1,385	132	175	2,249	36,554
Delivered
Total	4,408	835	566	11,281	157,503

=== Convoy, Loch Ewe to Arkhangelsk ===
Loch Ewe to Arkhangelsk
Ship	Year	Flag	GRT	Notes
SS Africander	1921	Panama	5,441	Sunk in air attack
MV Atheltemplar	1930	Merchant Navy	8,992	Damaged by U-457 Sunk by U-408, 16 casualties
SS Beauregard	1920	United States	5,976	Engine trouble, returned Loch Ewe
SS Campfire	1919	United States	5,671	
SS Charles R. McCormick	1920	United States	6,027	
SS Copeland	1923	Merchant Navy	1,526	Rescue ship
SS Dan-y-Bryn	1940	Merchant Navy	5,117	Vice-Convoy Commodore
SS Empire Baffin	1941	Merchant Navy	6,978	
SS Empire Beaumont	1942	Merchant Navy	7,044	Sunk in air attack
SS Empire Morn	1941	Merchant Navy	7,092	CAM ship
SS Empire Snow	1941	Merchant Navy	6,327	
SS Empire Stevenson	1941	Merchant Navy	6,209	Sunk in air attack
SS Empire Tristram	1942	Merchant Navy	7,167	
SS Esek Hopkins	1942	United States	7,191	
SS Goolistan	1929	Merchant Navy	5,851	
SS Hollywood	1920	United States	5,498	
SS John Penn	1942	United States	7,177	Sunk in air attack
SS Kentucky	1921	United States	5,446	Sunk in air attack
SS Lafayette	1919	United States	5,887	
SS Macbeth	1920	Panama	4,941	Sunk in air attack
SS Mary Luckenbach	1919	United States	5,049	Sunk in air attack
SS Meanticut	1921	United States	6,061	
SS Nathanael Greene	1942	United States	7,177	
SS Ocean Faith	1942	Merchant Navy	7,174	
RFA Oligarch	1918	Royal Fleet Auxiliary	6,894	Fleet oiler Joined from Spitzbergen group
SS Oliver Ellsworth	1942	United States	7,191	Sunk by U-408 1 casualty
SS Oregonian	1917	United States	4,862	Sunk in air attack
SS Patrick Henry	1941	United States	7,191	
SS Sahale	1919	United States	5,028	
SS Schoharie	1919	United States	4,971	
SS St. Olaf	1942	United States	7,191	
SS Temple Arch	1940	Merchant Navy	5,138	Flagship Convoy Commodore E. K. Boddam-Whetham
SS Virginia Dare	1942	United States	7,177	
SS Wacosta	1920	United States	5,432	Sunk in air attack
SS White Clover	1920	Panama	5,462	
SS William Moultrie	1942	United States	7,177	
MMS 90	—	Royal Navy	—	7–21 September 1942, MMS-class minesweeper rescue ship
MMS 203	—	Royal Navy	—	7–21 September 1942, MMS-class minesweeper rescue ship
MMS 212	—	Royal Navy	—	7–21 September 1942, MMS-class minesweeper rescue ship

=== Force Q ===
Force Q oilers
Ship	Year	Flag	GRT	Type	Notes
RFA Black Ranger	1941	Royal Fleet Auxiliary	3,417	Ranger-class tanker	Fleet oiler, sailed in convoy
RFA Gray Ranger	1941	Royal Fleet Auxiliary	3,313	Ranger-class tanker	Fleet oiler, sailed in convoy

=== Convoy ===
Convoy route
Ship	Year	Flag	GRT	Notes
Loch Ewe to Reykjavík only
SS Gateway City	1920	United States	5,432	
SS Oremar	1919	United States	6,854	
SS San Zotico	1919	Merchant Navy	5,582	
Joined at Reykjavík for Arkhangelsk
SS Andre Marti	1918	Soviet Union	2,352	Joined from Reykjavík
SS Exford	1919	United States	4,969	
SS Komiles	1932	Soviet Union	3,966	
SS Petrovski	1921	Soviet Union	3,771	
SS Richard Bassett	1942	United States	7,191	Joined from, returned to, Reykjavík (engine trouble)
SS Stalingrad	1931	Soviet Union	3,559	Joined from Reykjavík, sunk by U-408, 21 casualties
SS Sukhona	1918	Soviet Union	3,124	Sunk in air attack
SS Tbilisi	1912	Soviet Union	7,169	

=== Convoy formation ===
Convoy formation, * = ship sunk
column 1	column 2	column 3	column 4	column 5	column 6	column 7	column 8	column 9	column 10
11 Empire Baffin	21 Komiles	31 Empire Snow	41 Empire Beaumont*	51 Empire Tristram	61 Temple Arch	71 Ocean Faith	81 Dan-Y-Bryn	91 Empire Stevenson*	101 Oregonian*
12 Kentucky*	22 Petrovski	32 St Olaf	42 Patrick Henry	52 Sahale	62 Lafayette	72 Nathaniel Greene	82 Virginia Dare	92 Wacosta*	102 Macbeth*
13 Charles R McCormick	23 White Clover	33 Exford	43 Esek Hopkins	53 Empire Morn	63 Campfire	73 John Penn*	83 William Moultrie	93 Mary Luckenbach*	103 Stalingrad*
14 Andre Marti	24 —	34 Hollywood	44 Meanticut	54 Black Ranger	64 Schoharie	74 Goolistan	84 —	94 Africander*	104 Sukhona*
15 Copeland	25 —	35 —	45 Atheltemplar*	55 —	65 Gray Ranger	75 Tbilisi	85 —	95 —	105 Oliver Ellsworth*

The Motor Minesweepers MMS 90, MMS 203 and MMS 212 were being delivered to the Soviet Northern Fleet and were to act as rescue ships en route, receiving no position number.

== Operation EV ==
=== Loch Ewe to Iceland ===
Local escort
Ship	Navy	Class	Dates	Notes
HMS Echo	Royal Navy	E-class destroyer	2–8 September 1942	
HMS Campbell	Royal Navy	Scott-class destroyer leader	2–8 September 1942	Joined Heavy Cover Force
HMS Mackay	Royal Navy	Scott-class destroyer leader	2–8 September 1942	Joined Heavy Cover Force
HMS Montrose	Royal Navy	Scott-class destroyer leader	2–8 September 1942	Joined Heavy Cover Force
HMS Walpole	Royal Navy	W-class destroyer	2–8 September 1942	
HNoMS Eskdale	Royal Norwegian Navy	Hunt-class destroyer	2–8 September 1942	
HMS Farndale	Royal Navy	Hunt-class destroyer	2–8 September 1942	
HMT Arab	Royal Navy	ASW trawler	2–8 September 1942	To Reykjavík as escort
HMT Duncton	Royal Navy	ASW trawler	2–8 September 1942	
HMT Hugh Walpole	Royal Navy	ASW trawler	2–8 September 1942	
HMT King Sol	Royal Navy	ASW trawler	2–8 September 1942	
HMT Paynter	Royal Navy	ASW trawler	2–8 September 1942	

=== Escorts, Iceland to Arkhangelsk ===
Close escort
Ship	Flag	Class	Dates	Notes
HMS Alynbank	Royal Navy	Auxiliary anti-aircraft cruiser	7–21 September 1942	
HMS Ulster Queen	Royal Navy	Auxiliary anti-aircraft cruiser	7–21 September 1942	
HMS Achates	Royal Navy	A-class destroyer	7–21 September 1942	
HMS Malcolm	Royal Navy	Scott-class destroyer	7–21 September 1942	Cdr A. B. Russell SOE
HMS Amazon	Royal Navy	W-class destroyer	7–21 September 1942	
HMS Bergamot	Royal Navy	Flower-class corvette	7–21 September 1942	
HMS Bluebell	Royal Navy	Flower-class corvette	7–21 September 1942	
HMS Bryony	Royal Navy	Flower-class corvette	7–21 September 1942	
HMS Camellia	Royal Navy	Flower-class corvette	7–21 September 1942	
HMS Gleaner	Royal Navy	Halcyon-class minesweeper	7–21 September 1942	
HMS Harrier	Royal Navy	Halcyon-class minesweeper	7–21 September 1942	
HMS Sharpshooter	Royal Navy	Halcyon-class minesweeper	7–21 September 1942	
HMT Cape Argona	Royal Navy	ASW trawler	7–21 September 1942	
HMT Cape Mariato	Royal Navy	ASW trawler	7–21 September 1942	
HMT Daneman	Royal Navy	ASW trawler	7–21 September 1942	
HMT St Kenan	Royal Navy	ASW trawler	7–21 September 1942	

=== Carrier group ===
Avenger and escorts
Ship	Navy	Class	Dates	Notes
HMS Avenger	Royal Navy	Avenger-class escort carrier	9–17 September 1942	
HMS Wheatland	Royal Navy	Hunt-class destroyer	9–17 September 1942	
HMS Wilton	Royal Navy	Hunt-class destroyer	9–17 September 1942	

=== Fighting Destroyer Escort ===
==== Force A ====
Fighting Destroyer Escort Force A
Ship	Flag	Class	Dates	Notes
HMS Scylla	Royal Navy	Dido-class cruiser	9–17 September 1942	Flagship Rear Admiral Robert "Bullshit Bob" Burnett
HMS Offa	Royal Navy	O-class destroyer	9–17 September 1942	
HMS Onslaught	Royal Navy	O-class destroyer	9–17 September 1942	
HMS Onslow	Royal Navy	O-class destroyer	9–17 September 1942	
HMS Opportune	Royal Navy	O-class destroyer	9–17 September 1942	
HMS Ashanti	Royal Navy	Tribal-class destroyer	9–17 September 1942	
HMS Eskimo	Royal Navy	Tribal-class destroyer	9–17 September 1942	
HMS Somali	Royal Navy	Tribal-class destroyer	9–17 September 1942	
HMS Tartar	Royal Navy	Tribal-class destroyer	9–17 September 1942	

==== Force B ====
Fighting Destroyer Escort Force B
Ship	Flag	Class	Dates	Notes
HMS Faulknor	Royal Navy	F-class destroyer	9–17 September 1942	
HMS Fury	Royal Navy	F-class destroyer	9–17 September 1942	
HMS Impulsive	Royal Navy	I-class destroyer	9–17 September 1942	
HMS Intrepid	Royal Navy	I-class destroyer	9–17 September 1942	
HMS Marne	Royal Navy	M-class destroyer	9–17 September 1942	
HMS Martin	Royal Navy	M-class destroyer	9–17 September 1942	
HMS Meteor	Royal Navy	M-class destroyer	9–17 September 1942	
HMS Milne	Royal Navy	M-class destroyer	9–17 September 1942	Captain (D) Ian Campbell

=== Eastern Local Escort ===
Eastern local escort from Arkhangelsk
Ship	Flag	Class	Dates	Notes
Gremyashchy	Soviet Navy	Gnevny-class destroyer	17–22 September 1942	
Valerian Kuybyshev	Soviet Navy	Orfey-class destroyer	17–22 September 1942	
Sokrushitelny	Soviet Navy	Gnevny-class destroyer	17–22 September 1942	
Uritski	Soviet Navy	Orfey-class destroyer	17–22 September 1942	
HMS Britomart	Royal Navy	Halcyon-class minesweeper	17–22 September 1942	
HMS Halcyon	Royal Navy	Halcyon-class minesweeper	17–22 September 1942	
HMS Hazard	Royal Navy	Halcyon-class minesweeper	17–22 September 1942	
HMS Salamander	Royal Navy	Halcyon-class minesweeper	17–22 September 1942	

=== Cruiser Covering Force ===
Cruiser Covering Force
Ship	Flag	Class	Dates	Notes
HMS London	Royal Navy	County-class cruiser	14–22 September 1942	
HMS Norfolk	Royal Navy	County-class cruiser	14–22 September 1942	Flagship Vice-Admiral Stuart Bonham Carter
HMS Suffolk	Royal Navy	County-class cruiser	14–22 September 1942	
HMS Bulldog	Royal Navy	B-class destroyer	14–22 September 1942	
HMS Venomous	Royal Navy	W-class destroyer	14–22 September 1942	

=== Distant cover ===
Distant cover (Home Fleet)
Ship	Flag	Class	Dates	Notes
HMS Anson	Royal Navy	King George V-class battleship	11–14 September 1942	Flagship, Vice-Admiral Bruce Fraser
HMS Duke of York	Royal Navy	King George V-class battleship	11–14 September 1942	
HMS Jamaica	Royal Navy	Fiji-class cruiser	11–14 September 1942	
HMS Campbell	Royal Navy	Scott-class destroyer leader	11–14 September 1942	Joined from local escort group
HMS Mackay	Royal Navy	Scott-class destroyer leader	11–14 September 1942	Joined from local escort group
HMS Montrose	Royal Navy	Scott-class destroyer leader	11–14 September 1942	Joined from local escort group
HMS Broke	Royal Navy	Thornycroft type destroyer leader	11–14 September 1942	
HMS Keppel	Royal Navy	Thornycroft type destroyer leader	11–14 September 1942	Commander Jack Broome
HMS Bramham	Royal Navy	Hunt-class destroyer	11–14 September 1942	

=== Spitzbergen ===
Spitzbergen fuelling base (Note: Spelled as it was originally named.)
Ship	Flag	Class	Dates	Notes
RFA Blue Ranger	Royal Navy	Ranger-class tanker	9–21 September 1942	
RFA Oligarch	Royal Navy	Ol-class tanker	9–21 September 1942	
HMS Windsor	Royal Navy	W-class destroyer	9–21 September 1942	
HMS Worcester	Royal Navy	W-class destroyer	9–21 September 1942	
HMS Cowdray	Royal Navy	Hunt-class destroyer	9–21 September 1942	
HMS Oakley	Royal Navy	Hunt-class destroyer	9–21 September 1942	

=== Operation Gearbox II ===
Gearbox II (Spitzbergen supply run) (Note: Spelled as it was originally named.)
Ship	Flag	Class	Dates	Notes
HMS Cumberland	Royal Navy	County-class cruiser	14 September 1942	
HMS Sheffield	Royal Navy	Town-class cruiser	14 September 1942	
HMS Eclipse	Royal Navy	E-class destroyer	14 September 1942	

=== Submarine patrols ===
Submarine patrols (September–October 1942)
Boat	Flag	Type	Patrol	Notes
HMS Shakespeare	Royal Navy	S-class submarine	7–23 September	Off Norwegian coast
HMS Sturgeon	Royal Navy	S-class submarine	2–6 September	Patrol force, returned port
Rubis	Free French Naval Forces	Saphir-class submarine		Minelayer
HMS Tigris	Royal Navy	T-class submarine	2 September – 1 October	Patrol force
HMS Tribune	Royal Navy	T-class submarine	2 September – 1 October	Patrol force
HMS Unique	Royal Navy	U-class submarine	7 September – 1 October	Off Norwegian coast
HMS Unrivalled	Royal Navy	U-class submarine	7 September – 1 October	Off Norwegian coast
HMS Unshaken	Royal Navy	U-class submarine	2 September – 1 October	Patrol force
HNoMS Uredd	Royal Norwegian Navy	U-class submarine	2 September – 1 October	Patrol force
K-1	Soviet Navy	Soviet K-class submarine		Patrol
K-2	Soviet Navy	Soviet K-class submarine		Patrol
K-21	Soviet Navy	Soviet K-class submarine		Patrol
M-174	Soviet Navy	Soviet M-class submarine		Patrol
Shch-422	Soviet Navy	Shchuka-class submarine		Patrol

=== RAF ===
Search and Strike Force (Group-Captain Frank Hopps) based at Polyarny
Sqn	Type	No.	Role	Notes
1 PRU	Spitfire PR Mk IV(D)	3	Reconnaissance	1 written off 9 September, 1 shot down 27 September
144 Squadron RAF	Hampden	16	torpedo-bomber	Afrikanda, 6 lost in transit 4–5 September 1942
210 Squadron RAF	Catalina	9	Reconnaissance/ASW	Grasnaya, no losses
455 Squadron RAAF	Hampden	16	torpedo-bomber	Afrikanda, 3 lost in transit 4–5 September 1942

== Axis order of battle ==
=== U-boats ===
Wolfpack Trägertod (Death to carrier)
Name	Flag	Commander	Class	Notes
U-88	Kriegsmarine	Heino Bohmann	Type VIIC submarine	Sunk, Faulknor
U-255	Kriegsmarine	Reinhart Reche	Type VIIC submarine	
U-377	Kriegsmarine	Otto Köhler	Type VIIC submarine	
U-378	Kriegsmarine	Hans-Jürgen Zetzsche	Type VIIC submarine	
U-403	Kriegsmarine	Heinz-Ehlert Clausen	Type VIIC submarine	
U-405	Kriegsmarine	Rolf-Heinrich Hopmann	Type VIIC submarine	
U-408	Kriegsmarine	Reinhard von Hymmen	Type VIIC submarine	Sank Stalingrad
U-435	Kriegsmarine	Siegfried Strelow	Type VIIC submarine	
U-457	Kriegsmarine	Karl Brandenburg	Type VIIC submarine	Damaged Atheltemplar, sunk Impulsive
U-589	Kriegsmarine	Hans-Joachim Horrer	Type VIIC submarine	Sank Oliver Ellsworth, sunk (by) Onslow
U-592	Kriegsmarine	Carl Borm	Type VIIC submarine	
U-703	Kriegsmarine	Heinz Bielfeld	Type VIIC submarine	

=== Surface ships ===
Sortie, 9 September 1942
Name	Flag	Type	Notes
Admiral Hipper	Kriegsmarine	Admiral Hipper-class cruiser	
Admiral Scheer	Kriegsmarine	Deutschland-class cruiser	Flagship Vice Admiral Kummetz
Köln	Kriegsmarine	Königsberg-class cruiser	
Z4 Richard Beitzen	Kriegsmarine	Type 1934 destroyer	
Z23	Kriegsmarine	Type 1936A destroyer	
Z27	Kriegsmarine	Type 1936A destroyer	Flag Kapitän zur See Gottfried Pönitz
Z29	Kriegsmarine	Type 1936A destroyer	
Z30	Kriegsmarine	Type 1936A destroyer	

=== Aircraft involved ===
Luftflotte 5 (Note: Woodman (2004) has 42 Heinkel and 35 Ju 88 torpedo-bombers.)
Unit	Flag	Type	No.	Role	Notes
I./Kampfgeschwader 26	Luftwaffe	Heinkel He 111 H6	42–46	Torpedo-bomber	Banak
III./Kampfgeschwader 26	Luftwaffe	Junkers Ju 88 A17	27–35	Torpedo-bomber	Bardufoss
Kampfgeschwader 30	Luftwaffe	Junkers Ju 88	60	Bomber/dive-bomber	Banak
1./Kampfgeschwader 40	Luftwaffe	Focke-Wulf Fw 200	—	Long-range reconnaissance	Trondheim
1./Küstenfliegergruppe 406	Luftwaffe	Heinkel He 115	15	torpedo-bomber	Sørreisa, Billefjord, Tromsø
1./Küstenfliegergruppe 906	Luftwaffe	Blohm & Voss BV 138	—	Weather reconnaissance	Sørreisa, Billefjord, Tromsø
I(F)/22, I(F)/124	Luftwaffe	Junkers Ju 88	—	Reconnaissance	Banak, Bardufoss, Kirkenes

=== Luftflotte 5 ===
Luftflotte 5, order of battle, 1 June 1942
Command	Units
Luftflotte 5 HQ Colonel-General Hans-Jürgen Stumpff
Oslo	Wettererkundungsstaffel 5 (Weather reconnaissance squadron)
Fliegerführer Nord (Ost) (Note: Air Commander North (East)) Colonel Alexander Holle
Kirkenes	I., II./ Kampfgeschwader 30; II., 13./ Jagdgeschwader 5; I./ Sturzkampfgeschwader 5 (Dive-Bomber Wing); 3./ Kampfgeschwader 26; 1./ Seeaufklärungsgruppe 125 (Maritime Reconnaissance Wing); 1./ Fernaufklärungsgruppe 22; 1./ Fernaufklärungsgruppe 124 (Long-Range Reconnaissance Wing)
Fliegerführer Nord (West) (Note: Air Commander North (West))
—	I./ Kampfgeschwader 26; I./ Kampfgeschwader 40; 2./ Küstenfliegergruppe 906 (Coastal Reconnaissance Wing); Bordfliegerstaffel Tirpitz; 1./ Fernaufklärungsgruppe 120
Fliegerführer Lofoten (Note: Air Commander Lofotens) Colonel Ernst-August Roth
Bardufoss	III./ Kampfgeschwader 30; III./ Jagdgeschwader 5; 2./ Kampfgeschwader 26; 4./ Sturzkampfgeschwader 5; Kette 1./ Fernaufklärungsgruppe 124
Jagdfliegerführer Norwegen (Note: Fighter Commander Norway)
—	I./Jagdgeschwader 5; Jagdgruppe Drontheim (Fighter Wing)
Seenotdienstführer Norwegen (Note: Maritime Rescue Service Leader Norway)
—	Seenotbereichskommando VIII (Maritime Rescue Area Command); Seenotbereichskommando IX
