= Convoy QP 15 =

Arctic convoy of World War II

- Part of the Arctic Convoys of the Second World War
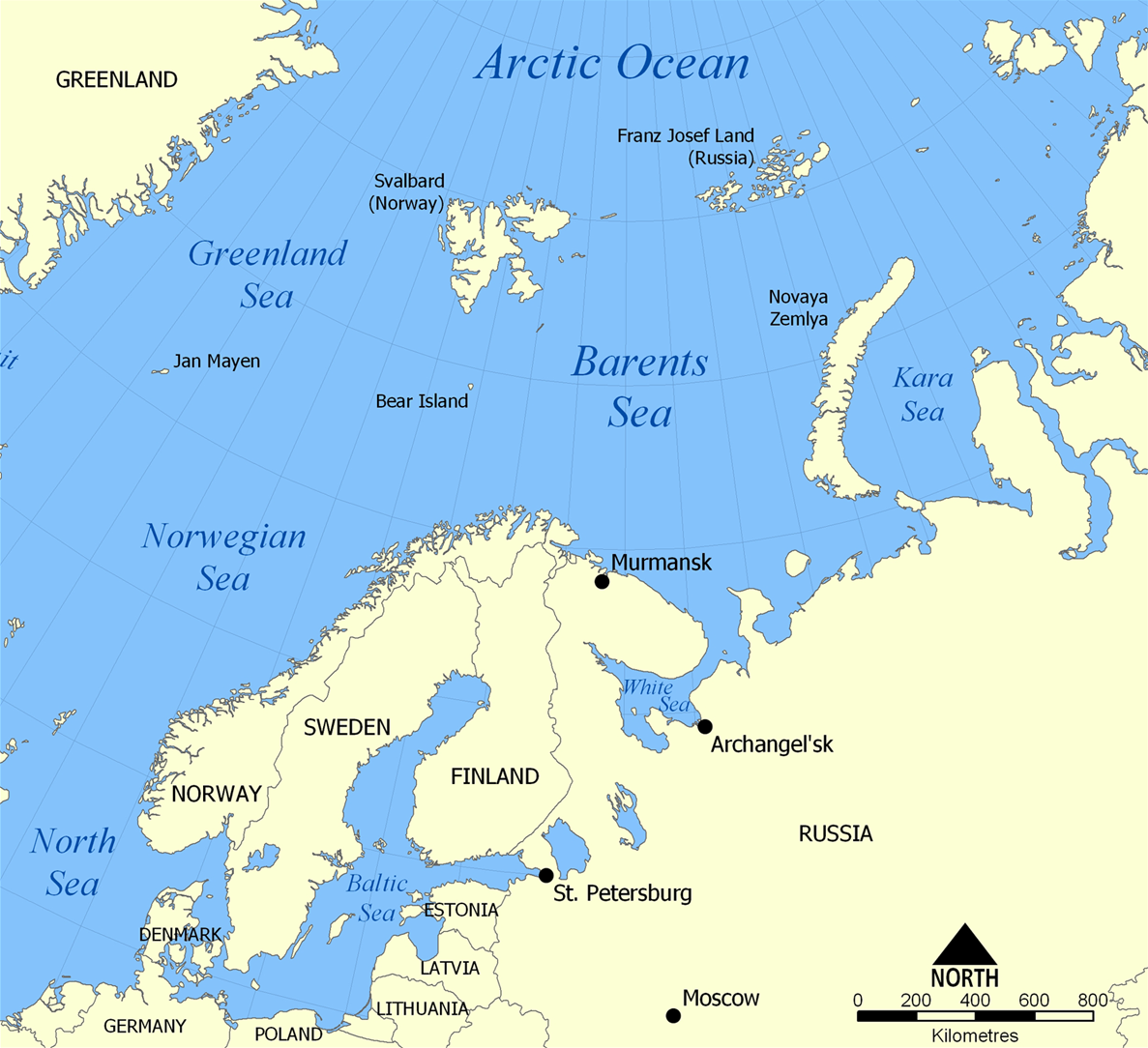
- The Norwegian Sea and the Barents Sea, site of the Arctic convoys
Date	17–30 November 1942
Location	Arctic Ocean

Belligerents
Germany	United Kingdom

Commanders and leaders
Karl Dönitz; Hubert Schmundt	Convoy commodore: William Meek; Escort: Alan Scott-Moncrieff

Strength
gruppe Boreas; (10 U-boats)	31 merchant ships; 30 escorts (in relays)

Casualties and losses
	93 killed; 2 merchant ships, 1 rescue ship did not sail; 2 merchant ships sunk; Sokrusitelny foundered

Convoy QP 15 (17–30 November 1942) was one of the Arctic convoys of World War II the last of the PQ–QP series between northern Russia and Britain. QP convoys were run during the Second World War to return Allied ships to their home ports. The convoy was intended to return many of the unloaded ships from Convoy PQ 18 before the White Sea froze.

The convoy sailed from Arkhangelsk in the White Sea on 17 November 1942. The convoy was scattered by a storm that began on 20 November, in which the Soviet destroyer Sokrushitelny was hit from behind (pooped) by a big wave and foundered on 22 November. The weather also grounded the Luftwaffe and led to the cancellation of a sortie by Admiral Hipper and its destroyers.

The convoy was attacked by U-boats of the Wolfpack gruppe Boreas that sank two of the merchant ships, even though they had received a course change to go south of Bear Island to avoid the U-boats. The convoy straggled into port in Iceland where it was re-organised into two groups and escorted to Loch Ewe in Scotland, the first section arriving on 30 November and the second section on 3 December.

== Background ==
=== Lend-lease ===
The Soviet leaders needed to replace the colossal losses of military equipment lost after the German invasion, especially when Soviet war industries were being moved out of the war zone and emphasised tank and aircraft deliveries. Machine tools, steel and aluminium were needed to replace indigenous resources lost in the invasion. The pressure on the civilian sector of the economy needed to be limited by food deliveries. The Soviets wanted to concentrate the resources that remained on items that the Soviet war economy had the greatest comparative advantage over the German economy. Aluminium imports allowed aircraft production to a far greater extent than would have been possible using local sources and tank production was emphasised at the expense of lorries and food supplies were squeezed by reliance on what could be obtained from lend–lease. At the Moscow Conference, it was acknowledged that 1.5 million tons of shipping was needed to transport the supplies of the First Protocol and that Soviet sources could provide less than 10 per cent of the carrying capacity.

The British and Americans accepted that the onus was on them to find most of the shipping, despite their commitments in other theatres. The Prime Minister, Winston Churchill, made a promise to send a convoy to the Arctic ports of the USSR every ten days and to deliver 1,200 tanks a month from July 1942 to January 1943, followed by 2,000 tanks and another 3,600 aircraft more than already promised. In November, the US president, Franklin D. Roosevelt, ordered Admiral Emory Land of the US Maritime Commission and then the head of the War Shipping Administration that deliveries to Russia should only be limited by 'insurmountable difficulties'. The first convoy was due at Murmansk around 12 October and the next convoy was to depart Iceland on 22 October. A motley of British, Allied and neutral shipping loaded with military stores and raw materials for the Soviet war effort would be assembled at Hvalfjörður in Iceland, convenient for ships from both sides of the Atlantic.

From Operation Dervish to Convoy PQ 11, the supplies to the USSR were mostly British, in British ships defended by the Royal Navy. A fighter force that could defend Murmansk was delivered that protected the Arctic ports and railways into the hinterland. Before September 1941 the British had dispatched 450 aircraft, 22,000 long tons (22,000 t) of rubber, 3,000,000 pairs of boots and stocks of tin, aluminium, jute, lead and wool. In September representatives from Britain and the United States travelled to Moscow to study Soviet requirements and their ability to meet them. The representatives of the three countries drew up a protocol in October 1941 to last until June 1942. British supplied aircraft and tanks reinforced the Russian defences of Leningrad and Moscow from December 1941. The tanks and aircraft did not save Moscow but were important in the Soviet counter-offensive. The Luftwaffe was by then reduced to 600 operational aircraft on the Eastern Front, to an extent a consequence of Luftflotte 2 being sent to the Mediterranean against the British. Tanks and aircraft supplied by the British helped the Soviet counter-offensive force push the Germans further back than might have been possible. In January and February 1941, deliveries of tanks and aircraft allowed the Russians to have a margin of safety should the Germans attempt to counter-attack.

=== Signals intelligence ===
==== Ultra ====
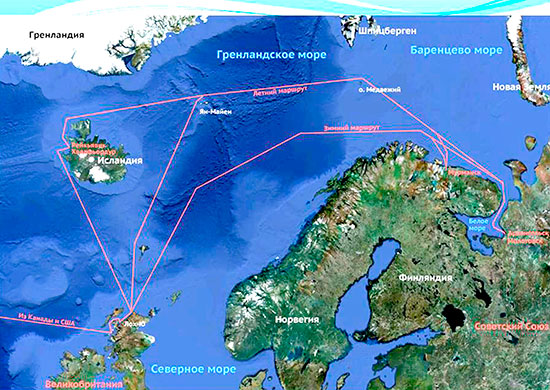
Russian map showing Arctic convoy routes from Britain and Iceland, past Norway to the Barents Sea and northern Russian ports

The British Government Code and Cypher School (GC&CS) based at Bletchley Park housed a small industry of code-breakers and traffic analysts. By June 1941, the German Enigma machine Home Waters (Heimish) settings used by surface ships and U-boats could quickly be read. On 1 February 1942, the Enigma machines used in U-boats in the Atlantic and Mediterranean were changed but German ships and the U-boats in Arctic waters continued with the older Heimish Home Hydra from 1942, Dolphin to the British). By mid-1941, British Y-stations were able to receive and read Luftwaffe W/T transmissions and give advance warning of Luftwaffe operations. In 1941, naval Headache personnel with receivers to eavesdrop on Luftwaffe wireless transmissions were embarked on warships.

=== B-Dienst ===
The rival German Beobachtungsdienst (B-Dienst, Observation Service) of the Kriegsmarine Marinenachrichtendienst (MND, Naval Intelligence Service) had broken several Admiralty codes and cyphers by 1939, which were used to help Kriegsmarine ships elude British forces and provide opportunities for surprise attacks. From June to August 1940, six British submarines were sunk in the Skaggerak using information gleaned from British wireless signals. In 1941, B-Dienst read signals from the Commander in Chief Western Approaches informing convoys of areas patrolled by U-boats, enabling the submarines to move into "safe" zones.

=== Arctic Ocean ===
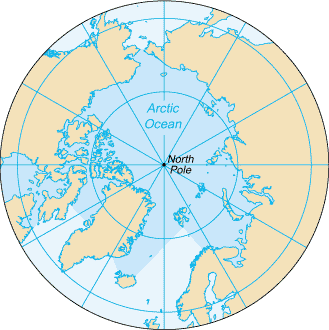
Diagram of the Arctic Ocean

Between Greenland and Norway are some of the most stormy waters of the world's oceans, 890 mi (1,440 km) of water under gales of snow, sleet and hail. The cold Arctic water was met by the Gulf Stream, warm water from the Gulf of Mexico, which became the North Atlantic Drift. Arriving at the south-west of England the drift moves between Scotland and Iceland; north of Norway the drift splits. One stream bears north of Bear Island to Svalbard and a southern stream follows the coast of Murmansk into the Barents Sea. The mingling of cold Arctic water and warmer water of higher salinity generates thick banks of fog for convoys to hide in but the waters drastically reduced the effectiveness of Asdic as U-boats moved in waters of differing temperatures and density.

In winter, polar ice can form as far south as 50 mi (80 km) off the North Cape and in summer it can recede to Svalbard. The area is in perpetual darkness in winter and permanent daylight in the summer and can make air reconnaissance almost impossible. Around the North Cape and in the Barents Sea the sea temperature rarely rises about 4 °C (39 °F) and a man in the water will die unless rescued immediately. The cold water and air makes spray freeze on the superstructure of ships, which has to be removed quickly to avoid the ship becoming top-heavy. Conditions in U-boats were, if anything, worse the boats having to submerge in warmer water to rid the superstructure of ice. Crewmen on watch were exposed to the elements, oil lost its viscosity and nuts froze and sheared off bolts. Heaters in the hull were too demanding of current and could not be run continuously.

== Prelude ==
=== Kriegsmarine ===
German naval forces in Norway were commanded by Hermann Böhm, the Kommandierender Admiral Norwegen. Two U-boats were based in Norway in July 1941, four in September, five in December and four in January 1942. Hitler contemplated establishing a unified command but decided against it. The German battleship Tirpitz arrived at Trondheim on 16 January, the first ship of a general move of surface ships to Norway. British convoys to Russia had received little attention since they averaged only eight ships each and the long Arctic winter nights negated even the limited Luftwaffe reconnaissance effort that was available. Admiral Hipper and Köln and their destroyers, in Altafjord waited for an opportunity to sail against a convoy.

=== Luftflotte 5 ===
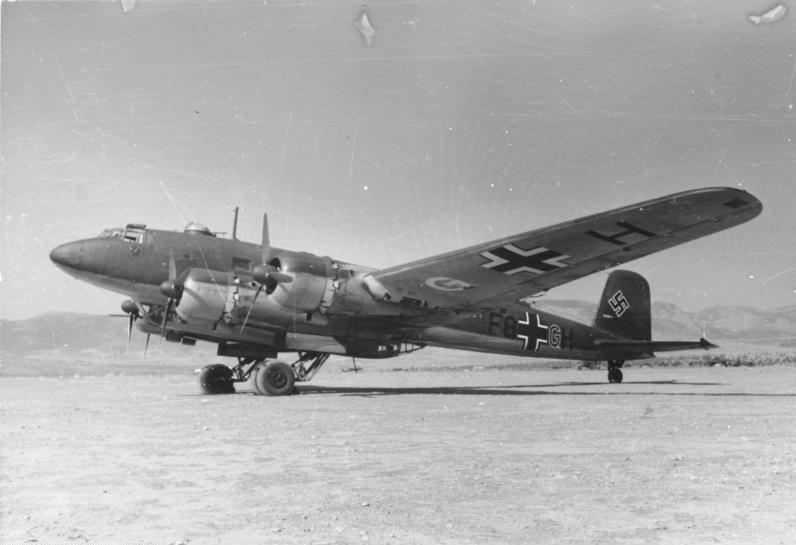
A Focke-Wulf Fw 200 Kondor of KG 40

In mid-1941, Luftflotte 5 (Air Fleet 5) had been re-organised for Operation Barbarossa with Luftgau Norwegen (Air Region Norway) headquartered in Oslo. Fliegerführer Stavanger (Air Commander Stavanger) covered the centre and north of Norway, Jagdfliegerführer Norwegen (Fighter Leader Norway) commanded the fighter force and Fliegerführer Kerkenes (Oberst [colonel] Andreas Nielsen) in the far north had airfields at Kirkenes and Banak. The Air Fleet had 180 aircraft, sixty of which were reserved for operations on the Karelian Front against the Red Army.

The distance from Banak to Arkhangelsk is 560 mi (900 km); Fliegerführer Kerkenes had ten Junkers Ju 88 bombers of Kampfgeschwader 30, thirty Junkers Ju 87 Stuka dive-bombers, ten Messerschmitt Bf 109 fighters of Jagdgeschwader 77, five Messerschmitt Bf 110 heavy fighters of Zerstörergeschwader 76, ten reconnaissance aircraft and an anti-aircraft battalion. Sixty aircraft were far from adequate in such a climate and terrain where,

...there is no favourable season for operations. (Earl Ziemke [1959] in Claasen [2001])

The emphasis of the Luftwaffe changed from army support to anti-shipping operations, after March 1942, when Allied Arctic convoys were becoming larger and more frequent, that coincided with the reinforcement of Norway with ships and aircraft and the less extreme climatic conditions of the Arctic summer. When Operation Torch (8–16 November 1942) the Allied invasion of French North Africa began, Luftflotte 5 was stripped of much of its bomber and torpedo-bomber force for the Mediterranean.

=== Arctic convoys ===
A convoy was defined as at least one merchant ship sailing under the protection of at least one warship. At first the British had intended to run convoys to Russia on a forty-day cycle (the number of days between convoy departures) during the winter of 1941–1942, but this was shortened to a ten-day cycle. The round trip to Murmansk for warships was three weeks and each convoy needed a cruiser and two destroyers, which severely depleted the Home Fleet. Convoys left port and rendezvoused with the escorts at sea. A cruiser provided distant cover from a position to the west of Bear Island. Air support was limited to 330 Squadron and 269 Squadron of RAF Coastal Command from Iceland, with some help from anti-submarine patrols along the coast of Norway from RAF Sullom Voe in Shetland. Anti-submarine trawlers escorted the convoys on the first part of the outward voyage. Built for Arctic conditions, the trawlers were coal-burning ships and had sufficient endurance. The trawlers were commanded by their peacetime crews and captains with the rank of Skipper, Royal Naval Reserve (RNR) who were used to Arctic conditions, added to by anti-submarine specialists of the Royal Naval Volunteer Reserve (RNVR). British minesweepers based at Arkhangelsk and Murmansk met the convoys to join the escort for the remainder of the voyage.

=== Convoy QP 15 ===
The diversion of many of the anti-shipping aircraft in Luftflotte V to the Mediterranean, led to the decision to run the convoy to retrieve as many unloaded ships as possible from Arkhangelsk and Murmansk in the Arctic before the winter freeze closed the White Sea. The convoy consisted of 31 merchant ships, to alleviate a shortage of ships in US ports, most from Convoy PQ 18, fourteen US, eight British, seven Soviet and one Panamanian-registered ship, despite Tovey saying that there were ten too many. The convoy commodore was Captain William Meek Royal Navy Reserve (RNR) in Temple Arch, the vice-convoy commodore was in DanY-Bryn, Copeland was a convoy rescue ship and SS Empire Morn was a CAM ship.

== Voyage ==
=== 17−22 November ===
The convoy sailed from Arkhangelsk on 17 November 1942 but Ironclad did not sail and Meanticut grounded after leaving harbour, both ships being left behind. Rathlin, the rescue ship, also stayed behind after damaging its rudder at Molotovsk. (Note: Meanticut was re-floated and returned to port. By the time the damaged ships were ready to sail, it was too late to catch up with the convoy.) The convoy was accompanied from the White Sea by the Eastern local escort, comprised of four Halcyon-class minesweepers, HMS Britomart, Halcyon, Hazard and Sharpshooter that were joined on 18 November by the Leningrad class destroyer Baku and the Gnevny class destroyer Sokrushitelny. The ocean escort sailed with the convoy on 17 November and comprised the Flower-class corvettes HMS Bergamot, Bluebell, Bryony and Camellia, joined by the Halcyon-class minesweeper HMS Salamander at the same time.

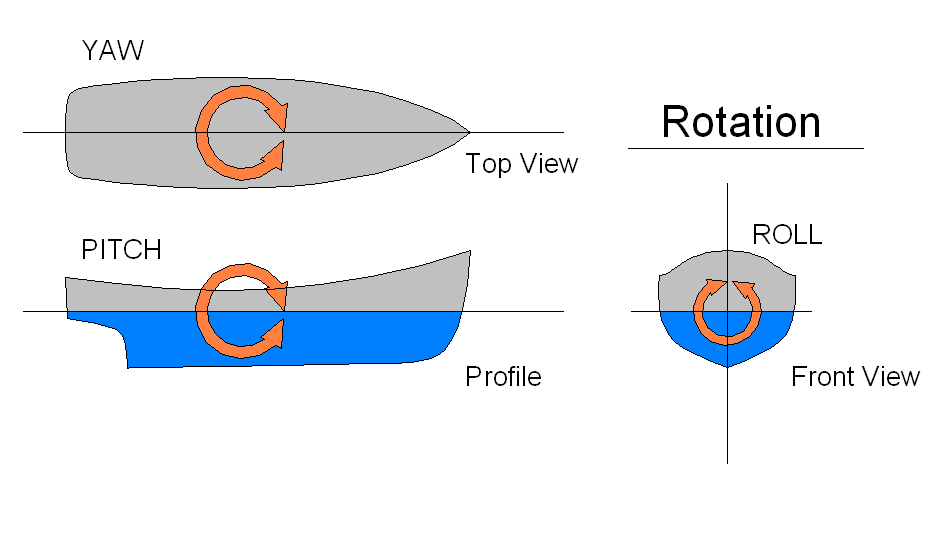
Ship gyrations

On 19 November, a Wolfpack, gruppe Boreas (god of the north wind) was formed in the Norwegian Sea by the Admiral Nordmeer, Hubert Schmundt, with ten U-boats, to lie in wait for the convoy. West of Bear Island (Bjørnøya) cruised the heavy cruisers HMS London and Suffolk with the destroyers HMS Forester, Obdurate and Onslaught. To defend against the German cruisers Admiral Hipper and Köln with their destroyers, in Altafjord, the submarines HMS Trespasser, Seadog, Junon and HNoMS Uredd lay in wait off the Norwegian coast. On 20 November, a gale blew up that dispersed the convoy and led to a fuel shortage amongst the ships of the close escort. Ulster Queen, Bluebell and Camellia had to detach from the convoy to refuel on 24 November.

The merchant ships pressed on but being mainly empty, pitched and rolled to an alarming degree in the storm that was blowing head-on. The smaller escorts were swept by spray that froze in the air and hit the ships and crewmen in exposed positions like splinters. Ice accumulated on superstructures when waves broke over the escorts. the convoy was supposed to have been joined by its ocean escort of the destroyers, HMS Echo and HMS Faulknor, Intrepid, Icarus and Impulsive from the Kola Inlet. Echo departed on 22 November when the Hunt class destroyers HMS Ledbury and Middleton were due to join.

==== Loss of Sokrushitelny ====
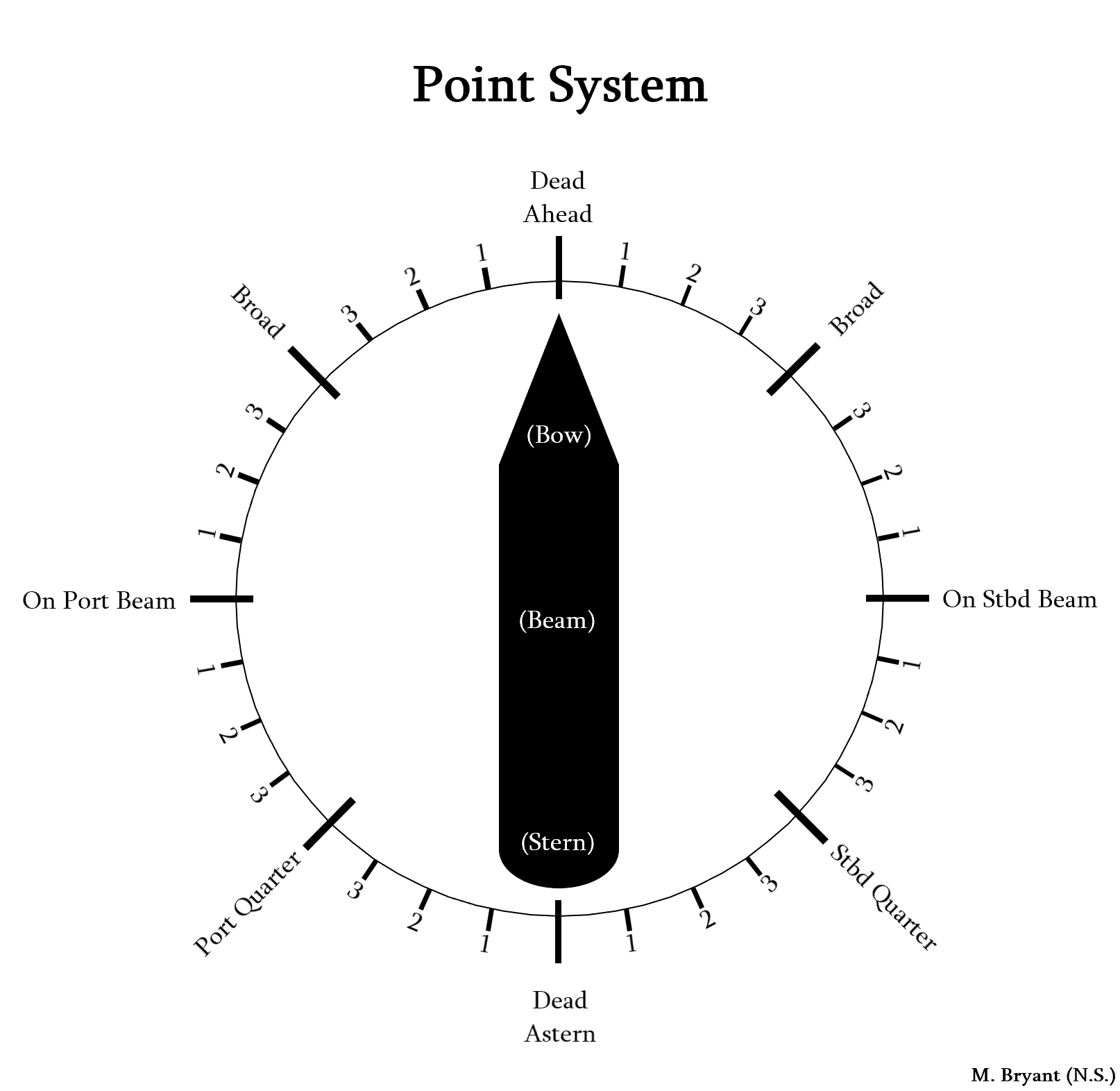
Diagram showing the starboard quarter at the rear on the right hand side of a ship

On 20 November, the convoy was at about the 30th meridian east, the usual departure point for the soviet destroyers from Murmansk, when the first storm blew up. Baku and Sokrushitelny turned for home in the storm, huge waves arriving on their starboard quarters, rolling the ships and scending the ship hulls (being forced upwards by passing waves) twisting their hulls and springing welds, Baku beginning to leak at the bows and the boiler room, some waves ripping away parts of the superstructure, the ship made for the Kola Inlet, the leaks getting worse but eventually arriving.

Sokrushitelny turned to run in the direction of the gale but was pooped (hit from behind) by a wave with a mass of water hitting the deck and pouring into the hull, flooding the engine and boiler rooms and lost power. Baku was in no condition to help and Golovko sent Valerian Kuybyshev, Razumny and Uritski. Sokrushitelny was adrift for two days, its hull gradually splitting and on 22 November the stern came adrift, six men being killed; both ends of the destroyer began to sink. The three destroyers managed to rescue 187 members of the crew in mountainous seas but 35 men were killed.

=== 23 November ===
HMS Musketeer, Oakley and Orwell were due to disengage the destroyers that were short of fuel but they failed to find the convoy due to the weather. The Admiralty ordered a change to the convoy route from north of Bear Island to its south, having received Ultra decrypts that wolfpack Boreas was in the Norwegian Sea, lying in wait for the convoy. Many of the merchant ships did not receive the order and followed the course given at the convoy conference. The ships that did receive the course change diverted south of the island. Goolistan followed the diversion only to be sunk by U-625, as did Kuznetz Lesov, that was sunk by U-601; both ships were lost with all hands.

=== 24 November – 3 December ===
Ulster Queen detached from the convoy on 24 November and on 26 November, Faulknor, Intrepid, Icarus and Impulsive detached from the convoy because of fuel shortage. Ships arrived at Iceland in small groups and were re-organised. Part of the convoy arrived at Loch Ewe on 30 November and the rest arrived on 3 December.

== Aftermath ==
=== Analysis ===
The weather that broke the convoy formation also caused difficulty to the Germans, who, with the Luftwaffe grounded, lost the advantage of aerial reconnaissance and hesitated to risk Admiral Hipper and its destroyers in such stormy weather. Having hoped to exploit the depletion of the Home Fleet for Operation Torch, the sortie was cancelled. German and Soviet destroyers had heavier guns than British destroyers, at the cost of being less stable in stormy seas. Convoy QP 15 was the last of the PQ−QP convoys. Henceforth, outbound convoys were coded JW and return convoys RA, the first convoys of the new cycle being Convoy JW 51A and Convoy RA 51, the last Arctic convoys of the year.

During the voyage of the convoy the commander of the Kriegsmarine, Grand Admiral Erich Raeder had discussions with Adolf Hitler, who was apprehensive of a British invasion of Norway while the winter darkness prevented air reconnaissance. Hitler ordered that a minimum of 23 serviceable U-boats should be kept in the Arctic Ocean to prevent an invasion and to attack Arctic convoys while much of the offensive strength of Luftflotte V was busy in the Mediterranean. Hitler required a study of an invasion of Iceland with transport submarines, even though they did not exist. Raeder briefed Hitler on the engine-trouble of Tirpitz and the shortage of fuel oil. The cruisers Lützow and Prinz Eugen were in the Baltic Sea ready to sail to Norway but the lack of fuel led only Lützow to be sent north.

At the Admiralty, Tovey discussed the escort arrangements for later convoys. With most of the naval effort for Operation Torch complete by late December, most of the ships detached from the Home Fleet were on their way home. Tovey wanted smaller convoys with less escorts but the Admiralty refused in favour of big convoys with cruiser cover, that was to keep contact with a convoy until quite late in the voyage. The fates of the ships of Convoy PQ 17 that was scattered, Operation FB where ships sailed singly and unescorted and Convoy QP 15 that was dispersed by storms, led to Tovey wringing a compromise out of the Admiralty, that Convoy PQ 19 was to be split into Convoy JW 51A and Convoy JW 51B that would sail separately.

=== Casualties ===
Goolistan was sunk with the loss of all 52 hands and Kuznetz Lesov was also sunk with all 41 crew lost.

== Allied order of battle ==
=== Merchant ships ===
Convoyed ships (Note: Convoys had a standard formation of short columns, number 1 to the left in the direction of travel. Each position in the column was numbered; 11 was the first ship in column 1 and 12 was the second ship in the column; 21 was the first ship in column 2.)
Ship	Year	Flag	GRT	P'n	Notes
SS Andre Marti	1918	Soviet Union	2,352	33	
SS Belomorcanal	1936	Soviet Union	2,900	12	
SS Charles R. McCormick	1920	United States	6,027	62	
SS Copeland	1923	Merchant Navy	1,526	54	Rescue ship
SS Dan-y-Bryn	1940	Merchant Navy	5,117	71	Vice-convoy commodore
SS Empire Baffin	1941	Merchant Navy	6,978	61	
SS Empire Morn	1941	Merchant Navy	7,092	13	CAM ship
Empire Snow	1941	Merchant Navy	6,327	31	
Empire Tristram	1942	Merchant Navy	7,167	72	
SS Esek Hopkins	1942	United States	7,191	73	
SS Exford	1919	United States	4,969	41	
SS Friedrich Engels	1930	Soviet Union	3,972	23	
SS Goolistan	1929	Merchant Navy	5,851	53	Sunk by U-625 on 23 November
SS Hollywood	1920	United States	5,498	93	
SS Ironclad	1919	United States	5,685	—	
SS Komiles	1932	Soviet Union	3,966	21	
SS Kuznetz Lesov	1933	Soviet Union	3,974	64	Sunk by U-601 on 23 November
SS Lafayette	1919	United States	5,887	43	
SS Meanticut	1921	United States	6,061	—	
SS Nathanael Greene	1942	United States	7,177	83	
SS Ocean Faith	1942	Merchant Navy	7,174	81	
SS Patrick Henry	1941	United States	7,191	82	
SS Petrovski	1921	Soviet Union	3,771	44	
SS Sahale	1919	United States	5,028	11	
SS Schoharie	1919	United States	4,971	32	
SS St Olaf	1942	United States	7,191	22	
SS Tbilisi	1912	Soviet Union	7,169	52	
SS Temple Arch	1940	Merchant Navy	5,138	51	Convoy commodore
HMS Ulster Queen	—	Royal Navy	—	42	AA cruiser 17–24 November, left to refuel
SS Virginia Dare	1942	United States	7,177	91	
SS White Clover	1920	Panama	5,462	63	
SS William Moultrie	1942	United States	7,177	92	

=== Escorts ===
Escort (in relays)
Ship	Flag	Class	Notes
Eastern local escort
Sokrushitelny	Soviet Navy	Gnevny-class destroyer	18–20 November, foundered, 22 November
Baku	Soviet Navy	Leningrad-class destroyer	18–20 November
HMS Britomart	Royal Navy	Halcyon-class minesweeper	17–20 November
HMS Halcyon	Royal Navy	Halcyon-class minesweeper	17–20 November
HMS Hazard	Royal Navy	Halcyon-class minesweeper	17–20 November
HMS Sharpshooter	Royal Navy	Halcyon-class minesweeper	17–20 November
Oceanic escort
HMS Echo	Royal Navy	E-class destroyer	20–22 November
HMS Faulknor	Royal Navy	F-class destroyer	20–26 November
HMS Intrepid	Royal Navy	I-class destroyer	20–26 November
HMS Icarus	Royal Navy	I-class destroyer	20–26 November
HMS Impulsive	Royal Navy	I-class destroyer	20–26 November
HMS Musketeer	Royal Navy	M-class destroyer	23–30 November
HMS Orwell	Royal Navy	O-class destroyer	23–30 November
HMS Oakley	Royal Navy	Hunt-class destroyer	23–30 November
HMS Ledbury	Royal Navy	Hunt-class destroyer	22–30 November
HMS Middleton	Royal Navy	Hunt-class destroyer	22–30 November
HMS Bergamot	Royal Navy	Flower-class corvette	17–30 November
HMS Bluebell	Royal Navy	Flower-class corvette	17–30 November
HMS Bryony	Royal Navy	Flower-class corvette	17–30 November
HMS Camellia	Royal Navy	Flower-class corvette	17–30 November
HMS Salamander	Royal Navy	Halcyon-class minesweeper	17–30 November
Distant escort
HMS London	Royal Navy	County-class cruiser	
HMS Suffolk	Royal Navy	County-class cruiser	
HMS Forester	Royal Navy	F-class destroyer	destroyer screen
HMS Obdurate	Royal Navy	O-class destroyer	destroyer screen
HMS Onslaught	Royal Navy	O-class destroyer	destroyer screen
Submarine patrols
Junon	Free French Naval Forces	Minerve-class submarine	
HMS Seadog	Royal Navy	British S-class submarine	
HMS Trespasser	Royal Navy	Triton-class submarine	
HNoMS Uredd	Royal Norwegian Navy	U-class submarine	
L-20	Soviet Navy	Leninets-class submarine	Minelayer

=== Rescue flotilla ===
Sokrushitelny rescue flotilla
Ship	Flag	Class	Dates	Notes
Razumny	Soviet Navy	Gnevny-class destroyer	20–22 November	Helped to rescue 187 men from Sokrushitelny
Kuibyshev	Soviet Navy	Novik-class destroyer	20–22 November	Helped to rescue 187 men from Sokrushitelny
Uritski	Soviet Navy	Orfey-class destroyer	20–22 November	Helped to rescue 187 men from Sokrushitelny

== German order of battle ==
=== Kriegsmarine ===
Wolfpack Boreas (god of the north wind) (19 November – 7 December 1942)
Name	Flag	Commander	Class	Notes
U-209	Kriegsmarine	Heinrich Brodda	Type VIIC submarine	
U-212	Kriegsmarine	Helmut Vogler	Type VIIC submarine	
U-376	Kriegsmarine	Friedrich-Karl Marks	Type VIIC submarine	
U-378	Kriegsmarine	Hans-Jürgen Zetzsche	Type VIIC submarine	
U-405	Kriegsmarine	Rolf-Heinrich Hopmann	Type VIIC submarine	
U-456	Kriegsmarine	Max-Martin Teichert	Type VIIC submarine	
U-586	Kriegsmarine	Dietrich von der Esch	Type VIIC submarine	
U-592	Kriegsmarine	Carl Borm	Type VIIC submarine	
U-601	Kriegsmarine	Peter-Ottmar Grau	Type VIIC submarine	Sank Kuznetz Lesov, 23 November
U-625	Kriegsmarine	Hans Benker	Type VIIC submarine	Sank Goolistan, 23 November

Sortie cancelled
Name	Flag	Type	Notes
Admiral Hipper	Kriegsmarine	Admiral Hipper-class cruiser	
Köln	Kriegsmarine	Königsberg-class cruiser	
Z4 Richard Beitzen	Kriegsmarine	Type 1934 destroyer	
Z23	Kriegsmarine	Type 1936A destroyer	
Z27	Kriegsmarine	Type 1936A destroyer	Flag Kapitän zur See Gottfried Pönitz
Z29	Kriegsmarine	Type 1936A destroyer	
Z30	Kriegsmarine	Type 1936A destroyer	

=== Luftflotte 5 ===
Anti-shipping aircraft
Unit	Flag	Type	Notes
I./Kampfgeschwader 26	Luftwaffe	Heinkel He 111 H6	Torpedo-bomber, 2 × LT F5b torpedoes each
Kampfgeschwader 30	Luftwaffe	Junkers Ju 88	Bomber/dive-bomber

== Bibliography ==
- Allen, Tony (2019). "SS Goolistan". Wrecksite.eu.
- Boog, H.; Rahn, W.; Stumpf, R.; Wegner, B. (2001). The Global War: Widening of the Conflict into a World War and the Shift of the Initiative 1941–1943. Germany in the Second World War. Vol. VI. Translated by Osers, E.; Brownjohn, J.; Crampton, P.; Willmot, L. (Eng trans. Oxford University Press, London ed.). Potsdam: Militärgeschichtliches Forschungsamt (Research Institute for Military History). ISBN 0-19-822888-0.
  - Rahn, W. "Part III The War at Sea in the Atlantic and in the Arctic Ocean III. The Conduct of the War in the Atlantic and the Coastal Area (b) The Third Phase, April–December 1941: The Extension of the Areas of Operations". In Boog et al. (2001).
- Boyd, Andrew (2024). Arms for Russia & the Naval War in the Arctic 1941–1945. Barnsley: Seaforth (Pen & Sword). ISBN 978-1-3990-3886-7.
- Claasen, A. R. A. (2001). Hitler's Northern War: The Luftwaffe's Ill-fated Campaign, 1940–1945. Lawrence, KS: University Press of Kansas. ISBN 0-7006-1050-2.
- Hague, Arnold (2000). The Allied Convoy System 1939–1945: Its Organisation, Defence and Operation. London: Chatham. ISBN 978-1-55125-033-5.
- Hancock, W. K.; Gowing, M. M. (1949). Hancock, W. K. (ed.). British War Economy. History of the Second World War, United Kingdom Civil Series. London: HMSO. OCLC 630191560.
- Helgason, Guðmundur (2024). "Wolfpacks: Boreas". U-boat.net.
- Hinsley, F. H. (1994) [1993]. British Intelligence in the Second World War: Its Influence on Strategy and Operations. History of the Second World War, United Kingdom Military Series (2nd rev. abr. ed.). London: HMSO. ISBN 978-0-11-630961-7.
- Kahn, D. (1973) [1967]. The Codebreakers: The Story of Secret Writing (10th abr. Signet, Chicago ed.). New York: Macmillan. LCCN 63-16109. OCLC 78083316.
- Lettens, Jan (2019). "Sokrushitelny (Сокрушительный)". Wrecksite.eu.
- Lettens, Jan (2017). "MV Kuznetz Lesov (Кузнец Лесов)". Wrecksite.eu.
- Macksey, K. (2004) [2003]. The Searchers: Radio Intercept in two World Wars (Cassell Military Paperbacks ed.). London: Cassell. ISBN 978-0-304-36651-4.
- Paterson, Lawrence (2016). Steel and Ice: The U-boat Battle in the Arctic and Black Sea 1941–45. Stroud: The History Press. ISBN 978-1-59114-258-4.
- Rohwer, Jürgen; Hümmelchen, Gerhard (2005). Chronology of the War at Sea: 1939–1945: The Naval History of World War Two (3rd rev. ed.). Annapolis, MD: Naval Institute Press. ISBN 978-1-59114-119-8.
- Roskill, S. W. (1957) [1954]. Butler, J. R. M. (ed.). The War at Sea 1939–1945: The Defensive. History of the Second World War United Kingdom Military Series. Vol. I (4th impr. ed.). London: HMSO. OCLC 881709135. Archived from the original on 27 February 2022.
- Ruegg, R.; Hague, A. (1993) [1992]. Convoys to Russia: Allied Convoys and Naval Surface Operations in Arctic Waters 1941–1945 (2nd rev. enl. ed.). Kendal: World Ship Society. ISBN 0-905617-66-5.
- Woodman, Richard (1994). Arctic Convoys 1941–1945 (hbk. ed.). London: John Murray. ISBN 0-7195-5079-3.
- Woodman, Richard (2004) [1994]. Arctic Convoys 1941–1945. London: John Murray. ISBN 978-0-7195-5752-1.
- Ziemke, Earl F. (1959). The German Northern Theatre of Operations, 1940–1945. Washington, DC: Headquarters, United States Department of the Army. OCLC 610363660. 20-271.
