= TCG Piyale Paşa =

TCG Piyalepaşa is the name of the following ships of the Turkish Navy, named for Admiral Piali Pasha:

- TCG Piyale Paşa (D 351), ex-HMS Meteor (G73), a M-class destroyer acquired in 1959
- TCG Piyale Paşa (D 350), ex-USS Fiske (DD-842), a Gearing-class destroyer acquired in 1980, scrapped in 1999
