= K189 =

K189 or K-189 may refer to:

- K-189 (Kansas highway), a state highway in Kansas
- HMS Bergamot (K189), a former UK Royal Navy ship
