= Elisabeth Smit =

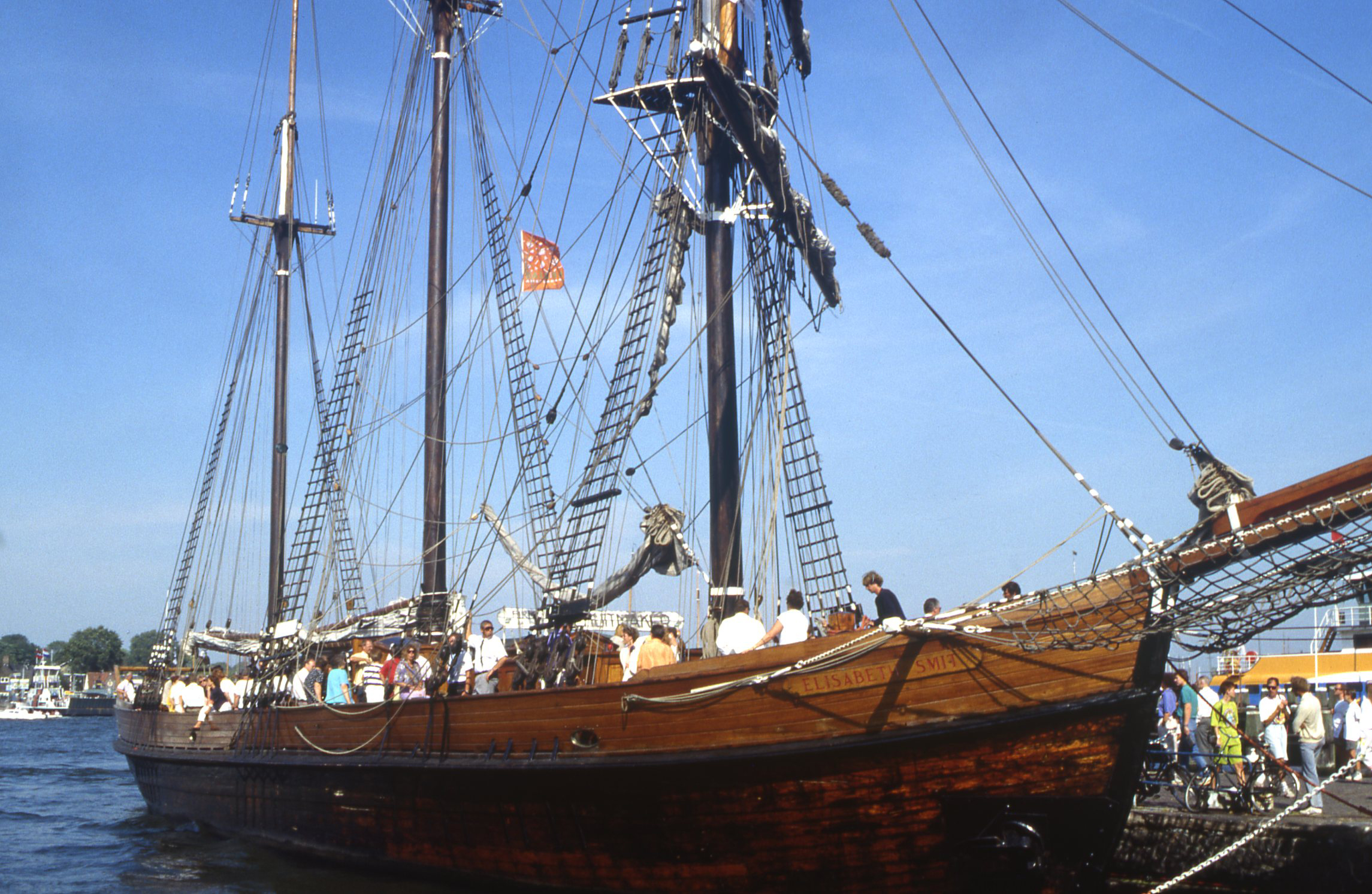
- Elisabeth Smit

History
- Name: MMS 54 (1941–44); Marken (1944–77); Elisabeth Smit (1977-2020)
- Owner: Royal Navy (1941–44); Royal Netherlands Navy (1944–57); Zeekadettenkorps (1957–77); Stichting Het Varend Museumschip (1977-2020)
- Port of registry: Royal Navy (1941–44); Royal Netherlands Navy (1944–57); Utrecht, Netherlands (1957–77); Muiden, Netherlands (1977–2020)
- Ordered: 5 September 1940
- Builder: Herd & Mackenzie
- Yard number: 89
- Launched: 22 September 1941
- Completed: 25 December 1941
- Commissioned: 1942 (Royal Navy); 23 August 1944 (Royal Netherlands Navy)
- Decommissioned: 1944 (Royal Navy); 1957 (Royal Netherlands Navy)
- Out of service: October 2002
- Identification: Pennant Number J554 (1941–44); Pennant Number FY54 (1944- ); Pennant Number MV7; Pennant Number M863
- Fate: Broken up December 2020

General characteristics
- Class & type: MMS-class minesweeper (1941–57); School ship (1957–77); Barquentine (1977–2020)
- Displacement: 295 Tons (1941–57)
- Length: 105 feet 0 inches (32.00 m) between perpendiculars
- Beam: 23 feet 0 inches (7.01 m)
- Draught: 9 feet 6 inches (2.90 m)
- Depth: 11 feet 0 inches (3.35 m)
- Propulsion: Diesel engine (1941–77); Sails (1977–2020)
- Speed: 11 knots (20 km/h) (1941–77)

Elizabeth Smit was a ship built in 1941, and scrapped in 2020. It was built for the Royal Navy as the MMS-class minesweeper HMS MMS 54. It was transferred to the Royal Netherlands Navy in 1944, serving as HNLMS Marken. In 1957, it became a school ship for the Dutch Zeekadetenkorps. It was sold in 1977 and turned into a barquentine in civilian service, renamed Elizabeth Smit. It was badly damaged in 2002 and was scrapped in 2020.

== Description ==
As built, it was 105 feet 0 inches (32.00 m) long between perpendiculars, with a beam of 23 feet 0 inches (7.01 m). It had a depth of 11 feet 0 inches (3.35 m) and a draught of 9 feet 6 inches (2.90 m). The ship was powered by a diesel engine which was built by Crossley Brothers, Manchester. It had eight cylinders of 10 1/2 inches (27 cm) diameter by 13 1/2 inches (34 cm) stroke. It drove a single screw propeller. Maximum speed was 11 knots (20 km/h).

== History ==
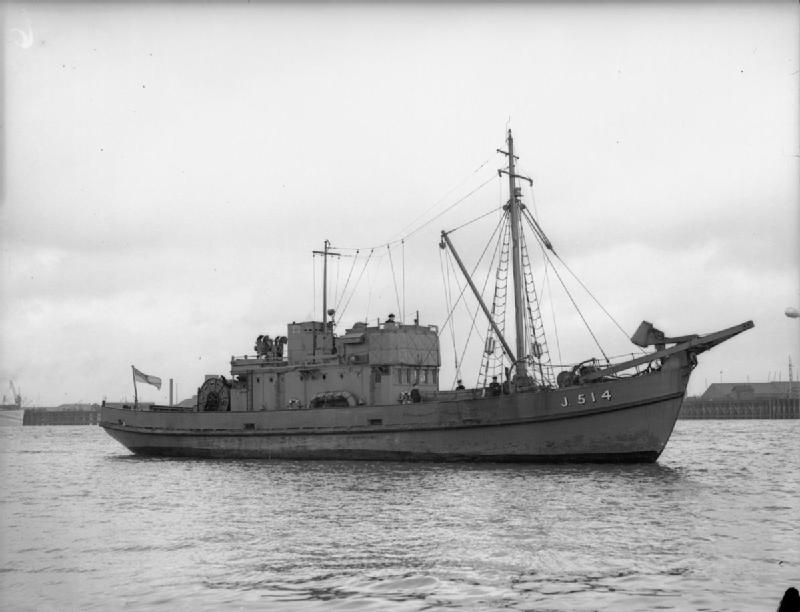
An MMS-class minesweeper, similar to HMS MMS 54.

=== Naval service ===
HMS MMS 54 was ordered on 5 September 1940. It was built by Herd & Mackenzie, Buckie, Fife. It was launched on 22 September 1941 and was completed on 25 December. Assigned the pennant number J554, it was assigned to the Royal Navy's 103rd Minesweeping Flotilla, based at Sheerness. In 1942, it was assigned to the 102nd Minesweeping Flotilla, also based at Sheerness. In 1944, it was transferred to the Royal Netherlands Navy. and commissioned on 23 August as HNLMS Marken, named after the village and former island of Marken in North Holland, with the pennant number FY54. The ship was a replacement for HNLMS Marken, which had struck a mine and sank in the Thames Estuary off the Sunk Lightvessel. In 1945, it was assigned to the 139th Minesweeping Flotilla, operating in Dutch waters.

HNLMS Haren subsequently carried the pennant numbers MV7 and M863. In 1957, it was transferred to the Zeekadettencorps, based at Utrecht.

=== Passenger ship ===
Marken was sold in 1977 to the Stichting Het Varend Museumschip of Muiden, Netherlands. It was converted to a barquentine, renamed Elisabeth Smit and used for passenger cruises on the IJsselmeer.

In May 1981, politician Jan Terlouw, leader of the Democrats 66 party, chartered the ship to stage a protest against the proposed reclamation of the Markerwaard.

Elisabeth Smit was severely damaged in a storm whilst moored at Muiden in October 2002. The ship became derelict. It was broken up on and after 7 December 2020.
