= SS Mary Luckenbach =

SS Mary Luckenbach may refer to the following ships:

- SS Mary Luckenbach (1918), a Hog Islander, launched with that name, then taken up as USS Sac City (ID-3861); renamed Black Falcon (1932) and, again, Mary Luckenbach (1941); sunk by an aerial torpedo on 13 September 1942
- SS Mary Luckenbach (1920), a Design 1019 ship (ID-4556); renamed four times between 1936 and 1957; scrapped in 1963
- SS Mary Luckenbach (1945), a post-World War II name for the United States Navy attack cargo ship USS Waukesha (AKA-84); collided with and sank U.S. Navy hospital ship USS Benevolence in 1950; scrapped in 1970
