= German submarine U-555 =

German World War II submarine

History

Nazi Germany
- Name: U-555
- Ordered: 25 September 1939
- Builder: Blohm & Voss, Hamburg
- Yard number: 531
- Laid down: 2 January 1940
- Launched: 7 December 1940
- Commissioned: 30 January 1941
- Decommissioned: March 1945
- Fate: Surrendered on 3 May 1945, broken up in 1946

General characteristics
- Class & type: Type VIIC submarine
- Displacement: 769 tonnes (757 long tons) surfaced; 871 t (857 long tons) submerged
- Length: 67.10 m (220 ft 2 in) o/a; 50.50 m (165 ft 8 in) pressure hull
- Beam: 6.20 m (20 ft 4 in) o/a; 4.70 m (15 ft 5 in) pressure hull
- Height: 9.60 m (31 ft 6 in)
- Draught: 4.74 m (15 ft 7 in)
- Installed power: 2,800–3,200 PS (2,100–2,400 kW; 2,800–3,200 bhp) (diesels); 750 PS (550 kW; 740 shp) (electric)
- Propulsion: 2 shafts; 2 × diesel engines; 2 × electric motors.
- Speed: 17.7 knots (32.8 km/h; 20.4 mph) surfaced; 7.6 knots (14.1 km/h; 8.7 mph) submerged
- Range: 8,500 nmi (15,700 km; 9,800 mi) at 10 knots (19 km/h; 12 mph) surfaced; 80 nmi (150 km; 92 mi) at 4 knots (7.4 km/h; 4.6 mph) submerged
- Test depth: 230 m (750 ft); Crush depth: 250–295 m (820–968 ft)
- Complement: 4 officers, 40–56 enlisted
- Armament: 2 × 53.3 cm (21 in) torpedo tubes (bow); 14 × G7e torpedoes or 26 TMA mines; 1 × 8.8 cm (3.46 in) deck gun (220 rounds); 1 x 2 cm (0.79 in) C/30 AA gun

Service record
- Part of: 24th U-boat Flotilla; 30 January 1941 – 30 November 1942; 21st U-boat Flotilla; 1 December 1942 – March 1945
- Identification codes: M 34 971
- Commanders: Kptlt. Hans-Joachim Horrer; 30 January – 25 August 1941; Kptlt.. Götz von Hartmann; 26 August 1941 – 4 February 1942; Oblt.z.S. Horst Rendtel; 5 February – August 1942; Lt.z.S. Franz Saar; August – 4 October 1942; Oblt.z.S. Dieter Erdmann; 5 October 1942 – 30 November 1943; Oblt.z.S. Detlev Fritz; 1 December 1943 – March 1945
- Operations: None
- Victories: None

German submarine U-555 was a Type VIIC U-boat of Nazi Germany's Kriegsmarine during World War II. The submarine was laid down on 2 January 1940 at the Blohm & Voss yard in Hamburg as yard number 531, launched on 7 December 1940, and commissioned on 30 January 1941 under the command of Kapitänleutnant Hans-Joachim Horrer.

== Design ==
German Type VIIC submarines were preceded by the shorter Type VIIB submarines. U-555 had a displacement of 769 tonnes (757 long tons) when at the surface and 871 tonnes (857 long tons) while submerged. She had a total length of 67.10 m (220 ft 2 in), a pressure hull length of 50.50 m (165 ft 8 in), a beam of 6.20 m (20 ft 4 in), a height of 9.60 m (31 ft 6 in), and a draught of 4.74 m (15 ft 7 in). The submarine was powered by two Germaniawerft F46 four-stroke, six-cylinder supercharged diesel engines producing a total of 2,800 to 3,200 metric horsepower (2,060 to 2,350 kW; 2,760 to 3,160 shp) for use while surfaced, two BBC GG UB 720/8 double-acting electric motors producing a total of 750 metric horsepower (550 kW; 740 shp) for use while submerged. She had two shafts and two 1.23 m (4 ft) propellers. The boat was capable of operating at depths of up to 230 metres (750 ft).

The submarine had a maximum surface speed of 17.7 knots (32.8 km/h; 20.4 mph) and a maximum submerged speed of 7.6 knots (14.1 km/h; 8.7 mph). When submerged, the boat could operate for 80 nautical miles (150 km; 92 mi) at 4 knots (7.4 km/h; 4.6 mph); when surfaced, she could travel 8,500 nautical miles (15,700 km; 9,800 mi) at 10 knots (19 km/h; 12 mph). U-555 was fitted with two 53.3 cm (21 in) torpedo tubes at the bow, fourteen torpedoes, one 8.8 cm (3.46 in) SK C/35 naval gun, 220 rounds, and a 2 cm (0.79 in) C/30 anti-aircraft gun. The boat had a complement of between forty-four and sixty.

== Service history ==
Initially attached to the 24th U-boat Flotilla, she was transferred to the 21st U-boat Flotilla based at Pillau (now Baltiysk, Russia) on 1 December 1942, and served throughout the war under a number of commanders as a training boat, seeing no combat service.

The U-boat was stricken in March 1945, and surrendered to the British on 3 May 1945. She was later broken up in 1946.

== Bibliography ==
- Helgason, Guðmundur. "The Type VIIC boat U-555". German U-boats of WWII - uboat.net.
- Gröner, Erich; Jung, Dieter; Maass, Martin (1991). U-boats and Mine Warfare Vessels. German Warships 1815–1945. Vol. 2. Translated by Thomas, Keith; Magowan, Rachel. London: Conway Maritime Press. ISBN 0-85177-593-4.
