= SS Nathanael Greene =

World War II Liberty ship of the United States

History

United States
- Name: Nathanael Greene
- Namesake: Nathanael Greene
- Builder: North Carolina Shipbuilding Company, Wilmington, North Carolina
- Yard number: 2
- Way number: 2
- Laid down: 22 May 1941
- Launched: 17 January 1942
- Out of service: 24 February 1943
- Fate: Scrapped 1948

General characteristics
- Type: Liberty ship
- Tonnage: 7,000 long tons deadweight (DWT)
- Length: 441 ft 6 in (134.57 m)
- Beam: 56 ft 11 in (17.35 m)
- Draft: 27 ft 9 in (8.46 m)
- Propulsion: Two oil-fired boilers; Triple expansion steam engine; Single screw; 2,500 hp (1,864 kW)
- Speed: 11 knots (20 km/h; 13 mph)
- Capacity: 9,140 tons cargo
- Complement: 41
- Armament: 1 × Stern-mounted 4 in (100 mm) deck gun; AA guns

SS Nathanael Greene (MC contract 146) was a Liberty ship built in the United States during World War II. She was named after Nathanael Greene, Continental Army general famous for his service in the Southern theater of the American Revolutionary War. She was operated by the United States Lines under charter with the Maritime Commission and War Shipping Administration.

The ship was laid down by North Carolina Shipbuilding Company in their Cape Fear River yard on May 22, 1941, then launched on January 17, 1942. She was operated by United States Lines for the War Shipping Administration. In September 1942 Greene was part of the heavily escorted Arctic Convoy PQ 18. When fellow merchant ship SS Mary Luckenbach was struck by an aerial torpedo, its cargo of TNT detonated. One member of the Naval Armed Guard detachment assigned to the Greene was killed and the ship damaged. For her conduct during the convoy, the Greene and crew received the Gallant Ship Citation.

She was struck by a torpedo off Oran, Algeria February 23, 1943 and beached. Survey declared her a total loss the next day. She remained in Algeria until sold to an Italian salvage company and was scrapped in 1948.
