= German submarine U-589 =

German World War II submarine

History

Nazi Germany
- Name: U-589
- Ordered: 16 January 1940
- Builder: Blohm & Voss, Hamburg
- Yard number: 565
- Laid down: 31 October 1940
- Launched: 6 August 1941
- Commissioned: 25 September 1941
- Fate: Sunk on 14 September 1942

General characteristics
- Class & type: Type VIIC submarine
- Displacement: 769 tonnes (757 long tons) surfaced; 871 t (857 long tons) submerged
- Length: 67.10 m (220 ft 2 in) o/a; 50.50 m (165 ft 8 in) pressure hull
- Beam: 6.20 m (20 ft 4 in) o/a; 4.70 m (15 ft 5 in) pressure hull
- Height: 9.60 m (31 ft 6 in)
- Draught: 4.74 m (15 ft 7 in)
- Installed power: 2,800–3,200 PS (2,100–2,400 kW; 2,800–3,200 bhp) (diesels); 750 PS (550 kW; 740 shp) (electric)
- Propulsion: 2 shafts; 2 × diesel engines; 2 × electric motors
- Speed: 17.7 knots (32.8 km/h; 20.4 mph) surfaced; 7.6 knots (14.1 km/h; 8.7 mph) submerged
- Range: 8,500 nmi (15,700 km; 9,800 mi) at 10 knots (19 km/h; 12 mph) surfaced; 80 nmi (150 km; 92 mi) at 4 knots (7.4 km/h; 4.6 mph) submerged
- Test depth: 230 m (750 ft); Crush depth: 250–295 m (820–968 ft)
- Complement: 4 officers, 40–56 enlisted
- Armament: 5 × 53.3 cm (21 in) torpedo tubes (four bow, one stern); 14 × torpedoes or 26 TMA mines; 1 × 8.8 cm (3.46 in) deck gun (220 rounds); 1 x 2 cm (0.79 in) C/30 AA gun

Service record
- Part of: 6th U-boat Flotilla; 25 September 1941 – 30 June 1942; 11th U-boat Flotilla; 1 July – 14 September 1942
- Identification codes: M 21 755
- Commanders: K.Kapt. Hans-Joachim Horrer; 25 September 1941 – 14 September 1942
- Operations: 7 patrols: 1st patrol: 28 February – 21 March 1942; 2nd patrol: 24 March – 2 April 1942; 3rd patrol: 8 – 20 April 1942; 4th patrol: a. 29 April – 6 May 1942; b. 8 – 12 May 1942; c. 16 – 23 May 1942; d. 26 – 28 May 1942; 5th patrol: 17 July – 12 August 1942; 6th patrol: 23 August – 1 September 1942; 7th patrol: 9 – 14 September 1942
- Victories: 1 auxiliary warship sunk (417 GRT); 1 merchant ship damaged (2,847 GRT)

German submarine U-589 was a Type VIIC U-boat of Nazi Germany's Kriegsmarine during World War II.

She carried out seven patrols, was a member of ten wolfpacks, sank one ship of 417 gross register tons (GRT) and damaged one other of 2,847 GRT.

The boat was sunk by depth charges from a British warship assisted by a British aircraft on 14 September 1942.

== Design ==
German Type VIIC submarines were preceded by the shorter Type VIIB submarines. U-589 had a displacement of 769 tonnes (757 long tons) when at the surface and 871 tonnes (857 long tons) while submerged. She had a total length of 67.10 m (220 ft 2 in), a pressure hull length of 50.50 m (165 ft 8 in), a beam of 6.20 m (20 ft 4 in), a height of 9.60 m (31 ft 6 in), and a draught of 4.74 m (15 ft 7 in). The submarine was powered by two Germaniawerft F46 four-stroke, six-cylinder supercharged diesel engines producing a total of 2,800 to 3,200 metric horsepower (2,060 to 2,350 kW; 2,760 to 3,160 shp) for use while surfaced, two Brown, Boveri & Cie GG UB 720/8 double-acting electric motors producing a total of 750 metric horsepower (550 kW; 740 shp) for use while submerged. She had two shafts and two 1.23 m (4 ft) propellers. The boat was capable of operating at depths of up to 230 metres (750 ft).

The submarine had a maximum surface speed of 17.7 knots (32.8 km/h; 20.4 mph) and a maximum submerged speed of 7.6 knots (14.1 km/h; 8.7 mph). When submerged, the boat could operate for 80 nautical miles (150 km; 92 mi) at 4 knots (7.4 km/h; 4.6 mph); when surfaced, she could travel 8,500 nautical miles (15,700 km; 9,800 mi) at 10 knots (19 km/h; 12 mph). U-589 was fitted with five 53.3 cm (21 in) torpedo tubes (four fitted at the bow and one at the stern), fourteen torpedoes, one 8.8 cm (3.46 in) SK C/35 naval gun, 220 rounds, and a 2 cm (0.79 in) C/30 anti-aircraft gun. The boat had a complement of between forty-four and sixty.

== Service history ==
The submarine was laid down on 31 October 1940 at Blohm & Voss, Hamburg as yard number 565, launched on 6 August 1941 and commissioned on 25 September under the command of Korvettenkapitän Hans-Joachim Horrer.

She served with the 6th U-boat Flotilla from 26 June 1941 for training and stayed with that organization for operations from 1 February 1942. She was reassigned to the 11th flotilla on 1 July.

=== First and second patrols ===
U-589's first patrol was preceded by a short trip from Kiel to the German-controlled island of Helgoland, (also known as Heligoland), in February 1942. The patrol itself commenced on the 28th. She steamed through the Norwegian Sea and arrived at Kirkenes in the far north of Norway on 21 March.

On her second patrol she fired four torpedoes at the minesweeper HMS Niger but the tracks were seen and evasive action was carried out. An unsuccessful depth charge attack followed which caused no damage to the U-boat.

=== Third patrol ===
She left Kirkenes on 8 April 1942 and covered the Barents Sea. She returned to her start point on the 20th.

=== Fourth patrol ===
U-589 damaged the Soviet merchant vessel Tsiolkovskij on 1 May 1942. This ship was later sunk by the German destroyers Z-24 and Z-25.

=== Fifth patrol ===
After more short voyages from Kirkenes to Skjomenfjord (south of Narvik), then Narvik itself and Bergen in May 1942, she carried out a relatively uneventful patrol which culminated in her arrival at Skjomenfjord on 12 August.

=== Sixth patrol ===
The boat set out for her sixth sortie on 23 August 1942. She travelled as far east as Nova Zemlya and returned to Narvik on 1 September.

=== Seventh patrol and loss ===
U-589 set out from Narvik on 9 September 1942. On the 14th, she was sunk by depth charges, first from a Fairey Swordfish of 825 Naval Air Squadron from HMS Avenger, then the British destroyer HMS Onslow.

Forty-four men died with U-589; there were no survivors.

==== Alternate account of loss ====
U-589 was sunk on 12 September 1942 by the joint force of HMS Avenger and HMS Faulknor.

=== Wolfpacks ===
U-589 took part in ten wolfpacks, namely:

- Aufnahme (9 – 11 March 1942)
- Blücher (11 – 18 March 1942)
- Eiswolf (28 – 31 March 1942)
- Bums (8 – 10 April 1942)
- Robbenschlag (10 – 14 April 1942)
- Blutrausch (15 – 19 April 1942)
- Strauchritter (29 April – 5 May 1942)
- Greif (16 – 22 May 1942)
- Nebelkönig (27 July – 11 August 1942)
- Trägertod (12 – 14 September 1942)

== Summary of raiding history ==
Date	Ship Name	Nationality	Tonnage (GRT)	Fate
1 May 1942	Tsiolkovsky	Soviet Union	2,847	Damaged
11 October 1942	Musson (No 23)	Soviet Navy	417	Sunk (mine)

== Bibliography ==
- Gröner, Eric; Jung, Dieter; Maass, Martin (1991). German Warships 1815-1945: U-boats and Mine Warfare Vessels. Vol. 2. Translated by Thomas, Keith; Magowan, Rachel. London: Conway Maritime Press. ISBN 0-85177-593-4.
- Kemp, Paul (1997). U-Boats Destroyed – German Submarine Losses in the World Wars. Arms & Armour. ISBN 1-85409-515-3.
- Smith, Peter (1968). Destroyer Leader: The Story of HMS Faulknor. London: William Kimber & Co.
