= SS St. Olaf =

Liberty ship of WWII

History

United States
- Name: USAHS St. Olaf
- Namesake: St. Olaf
- Owner: War Shipping Administration (WSA)
- Operator: Union Sulphur Co., Inc.
- Ordered: as type (EC2-S-C1) hull, MCE hull 33
- Awarded: 14 March 1941
- Builder: Bethlehem-Fairfield Shipyard, Baltimore, Maryland
- Cost: $1,111,815
- Yard number: 2020
- Way number: 7
- Laid down: 6 January 1942
- Launched: 12 April 1942
- Completed: 20 May 1942
- Fate: Sold to United States Department of War, 22 November 1943

United States
- Name: St. Olaf
- Owner: United States Department of War
- Operator: US Army
- Commissioned: July 1944
- Recommissioned: 1946
- Decommissioned: November 1945; June 1947
- Refit: Simpson Yard, Boston, July 1944
- Identification: USAHS (United States Army Hospital Ship) 1944—1945; USAT (United States Army Transport) 1946—1947
- Fate: Returned to MARCOM, laid up in National Defense Reserve Fleet, Astoria, Oregon, 24 June 1947; Sold for scrapping, 1 April 1963

General characteristics
- Class & type: Liberty ship; type EC2-S-C1, standard
- Tonnage: 10,865 LT DWT; 7,176 GRT
- Displacement: 3,380 long tons (3,434 t) (light); 14,245 long tons (14,474 t) (max)
- Length: 441 feet 6 inches (135 m) oa; 416 feet (127 m) pp; 427 feet (130 m) lwl
- Beam: 57 feet (17 m)
- Draft: 27 ft 9.25 in (8.4646 m)
- Installed power: 2 × Oil fired 450 °F (232 °C) boilers, operating at 220 psi (1,500 kPa); 2,500 hp (1,900 kW)
- Propulsion: 1 × triple-expansion steam engine, (manufactured by Worthington Pump & Machinery Corp, Harrison, New Jersey); 1 × screw propeller
- Speed: 11.5 knots (21.3 km/h; 13.2 mph)
- Capacity: 562,608 cubic feet (15,931 m^{3}) (grain); 499,573 cubic feet (14,146 m^{3}) (bale)
- Troops: 591 patient capacity (Hospital ship); 1,067 troops (Transport ship); 147 dependents (Transport ship)
- Complement: 38–62 USMM; 21–40 USNAG
- Armament: Varied by ship; Bow-mounted 3-inch (76 mm)/50-caliber gun; Stern-mounted 4-inch (102 mm)/50-caliber gun; 2–8 × single 20-millimeter (0.79 in) Oerlikon anti-aircraft (AA) cannons and/or, 2–8 × 37-millimeter (1.46 in) M1 AA guns
- Notes: Armament removed when converted to Hospital Ship

SS St. Olaf was a Liberty ship built in the United States during World War II. She was named after St. Olaf, the King of Norway from 1015 to 1028. He was posthumously given the title Rex Perpetuus Norvegiae (English: Eternal/Perpetual King of Norway) and canonised at Nidaros, by Bishop Grimkell, one year after his death in the Battle of Stiklestad.

== Construction ==
St. Olaf was laid down on 6 January 1942, under a Maritime Commission (MARCOM) contract, MCE hull 33, by the Bethlehem-Fairfield Shipyard, Baltimore, Maryland; and was launched on 12 April 1942.

== History ==
She was allocated to Union Sulphur Co.Inc., on 20 May 1942.

On 22 November 1943, she was purchased by the United States Department of War to be converted to a hospital ship. From 23 November to late July 1944, she was converted at Simpson Yard, in Boston, by Bethlehem Steel Co. She was commissioned USAHS St. Olaf in July 1944. She had been given the name Jasmine but this wasn't used.

During the war, St. Olaf operated in the European-African-Middle East and Asiatic-Pacific Theaters. She was decommissioned in November 1945.

She was refit at Standard Shipbuilding Co., San Pedro, California, to a transport ship, for returning military personnel and their dependents from Alaska, to Seattle, Washington. She was recommissioned USAT St. Olaf in 1946, and again decommissioned in June 1947.

On 24 June 1947, she was laid up in the National Defense Reserve Fleet, Astoria, Oregon. She was sold for scrapping on 1 April 1963, to Zidell Explorations, Inc., for $62,023.26. She was removed from the fleet on 12 April 1963.

== Bibliography ==
- "Bethlehem-Fairfield, Baltimore MD". www.ShipbuildingHistory.com. 14 August 2008.
- Maritime Administration. "St. Olaf". Ship History Database Vessel Status Card. U.S. Department of Transportation, Maritime Administration.
- Davies, James (May 2004). "Specifications (As-Built)" (PDF). p. 23.
- "SS St. Olaf".
- "USAT St. Olaf".
- Charles, Roland W. (April 1947). Troopships of World War II. Washington, D.C.: Army Transportation Association. OCLC 1871625.
