= MMS-class minesweeper =

1940 class of British minesweepers

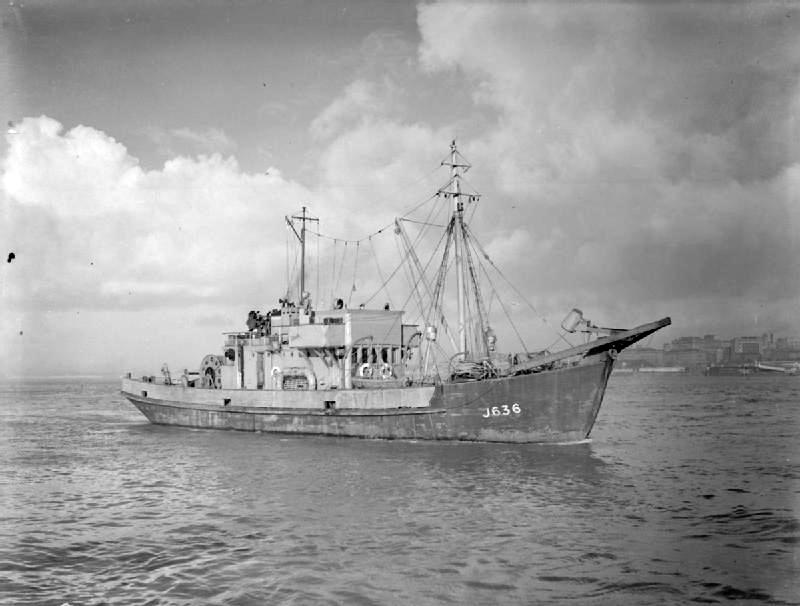
- 105 ft motor minesweeper

Class overview
- Operators: Royal Navy; Royal Canadian Navy; Royal Indian Navy; Free French Naval Forces; Royal Hellenic Navy; Royal Netherlands Navy; (Belgium) Free Belgian Navy; Royal Norwegian Navy; Soviet Navy; Italian Navy
- Subclasses: Llewellyn class
- Built: 1940–1945

General characteristics
- Type: Minesweeper
- Displacement: 240–250 long tons (244–254 t)
- Length: 105 ft (32 m) p/p; 119 ft (36 m) o/a
- Beam: 23 ft (7.0 m)
- Draught: 9 ft 6 in (2.90 m)
- Propulsion: Diesel engine, 375–425 bhp (280–317 kW)
- Speed: 12 knots (14 mph; 22 km/h)
- Complement: 20
- Armament: 2 × 20 mm AA guns; 2 × machine guns

The British Royal Navy operated large numbers of small Motor Minesweepers (MMS) during the Second World War, in two major classes: the first with 105 ft (32 m) hulls (of which 294 were built) and the second with 126 ft (38 m) hulls (of which 102 were built). Intended to counter magnetic influence mines in coastal waters, they had wooden hulls.

== 105 ft MMS ==
In the early months of the Second World War, Germany made extensive use of magnetic mines, which led to a requirement for a wooden minesweeper, less vulnerable than steel trawlers. The resultant design, the 105 ft-class (also known as the MMS 1 series and later the Type 1501 series) was built between 1940 and 1944.

They were 105 ft (32.0 m) long between perpendiculars, with an overall length of 119 ft 4 in (36.37 m), a beam of 23 ft 5 in (7.14 m) and a draught of 8 ft 9 in (2.67 m). Displacement was 240–255 long tons (244–259 t). They were powered by a 500 bhp (370 kW) diesel engine, giving a speed of 11 kn (13 mph; 20 km/h). Their major minesweeping equipment was the LL sweep, where two minesweepers operating side-by-side each trailed two buoyant cables with electrodes at the end of the cables. Pulsing a high current through the cables generated a magnetic field sufficient to set off mines over an area of about 1 acre (0.40 ha). They were later fitted with an SA sweep to deal with acoustic mines, which consisted of an acoustic hammer box mounted on an A-frame on the ship's bow, which could be lowered into the water when required. The ships did not have enough towing power to use conventional contact sweeps for dealing with moored contact mines. Defensive armament consisted of two 0.5 inch machine guns and/or one or two Oerlikon 20mm cannons. The ships had a complement of 20 men.

The coastal minesweepers had pennant numbers MMS-1 to MMS-118, MMS-123 to MMS-313 and MMS-1001 to MMS-1090, the last group measuring 126 feet between perpendiculars. They were nicknamed "Mickey Mouse" from their initials.

The motor minesweepers had limited use post-war and were quickly disposed of. By 1949, only four remained in service in the Royal Navy: St. David (MMS-1733, ex-MMS-233) Venturer (MMS-1761, ex-MMS-261), MMS-1717 (ex-MMS-217) and MMS-1736 (ex-MMS-236). St. David and Venturer were tenders to RNVR divisions.

Ten had been built for the Royal Canadian Navy, Coquitlam, Crankbrook, Daerwood, Kalamalka, La Vallée, Llewellyn, Lloyd George, Revelstoke, Rossland and St. Joseph. By 1946 only Llewellyn, Lloyd George and Revelstoke were still in service.

Five were built for the Royal Indian Navy, MMS-129, 130, 131, 132 (renamed Barq) and 154; MMS-151 was transferred later. Four remained in service in 1949: Barq and MMS-130, 151 and 154.

During the war, MMS-43, 45, 75, 79, 112, 182, 187, 188, 189 and 193 were manned by Belgian personnel. As late as 1949, MMS-182, 187, 188, 189, 191, 193 and 266 were on loan to the Belgian Navy.

Sixteen were transferred to the French Navy: D241 (ex-MMS-21; later D361), D242 (ex-MMS-184; later D362), D251 (ex-MMS-47; later D363), D252 (ex-MMS-9; later D364), D261 (ex-MMS-116; later D365), D262 (ex-MMS-118; later D366'), D291 (ex-MMS-133; later D367), D292 (ex-MMS-134; later D368), D371 (ex-MMS-221), D372 (ex-MMS-202), D373 (ex-MMS-220), D374 (ex-MMS-91), D375 (ex-MMS-75), D376 (ex-MMS-204), D377 (ex-MMS-49) and D378 (ex-MMS-13). All were returned to the Royal Navy in October 1947.

Eleven were transferred to the Royal Netherlands Navy; two were lost, one returned to the RN, and eight were retained postwar. The 11 vessels were: Ameland (ex-MMS-231), Beveland (ex-MMS-237), Marken (i) (ex-MMS-227, lost 20 May 1944), Marken (ii) (ex-MMS-54), Putten (ex-MMS-138), Rozenburg (ex-MMS-292), Terschelling (i) (ex-MMS-174, lost 12 July 1942), Terschelling (ii) (ex-MMS-234), Texel (i) (ex-MMS-173, returned to RN November 1942), Texel (ii) (ex-MMS-73), and Vlieland (ex-MMS-226). Vlieland was lost in Indonesian waters in November 1951.

Seventeen were loaned to the Italian Navy: MMS-10, 32, 34, 35, 48, 50, 99, 100, 102-106, 135, 167, 172 and 185. The first to be returned to the Royal Navy were MMS-34 and 35, in August 1949.

Eight were transferred to the Royal Hellenic Navy in 1946: Andros (ex HMS MMS-310, J810), Argyrokastron (ex-HMS MMS-58, J558), Chimarra (ex-HMS MMS-1 J501), Korytsa (ex-HMS MMS-53, J553), Mikonos (ex-HMS MMS-5, J505), Syros (ex-HMS MMS-313, J813), Tepeleni (ex-HMS MMS-46, J546), and Tinos (ex-HMS MMS-144, J644).

Three were transferred by Lend-Lease to the Soviet Navy, T-108, 109 and 110 (ex-MMS-90, 203 and 212, respectively).

=== Newfoundland MMS ===
MMS-119-122 were built in Newfoundland in 1941-42 and requisitioned by the Royal Navy. They were larger than the MMS-1 type but smaller than the MMS-1001 and BYMS-1 types, and had a top speed of 9 knots. The four vessels were renamed Emberley, Oderin, Marticot and Mervasheen, respectively, as danlayers in 1942.

== 126 ft MMS ==
This type comprised 90 vessels for the Royal Navy, numbered MMS-1001-1090, and 16 laid down for the Royal Canadian Navy but never delivered to that Service. They measured 126 feet long between perpendiculars and 139 feet 9 inches to 140 feet overall. Displacements were 360 tons standard and 430 tons deep load. A one-shaft diesel provided 1,000 bhp for a speed of 10 knots. Armament during the war comprised two 20mm guns with a few armed with four 20mm; the survivors with the RN in 1949 were armed with two 20mm and two machine guns.

By 1949, only 12 vessels of the type remained in RN service. Of these, MMS-1060 and 1061 were in use as minesweepers, while 1003, 1004 and 1011 were described in Jane's Fighting Ships as "mobile wiping deperming units." Seven were in use as tenders to RNVR divisions: Bernicia (ex-MMS-1090), Curzon (ex-MMS-1017), Graham (ex-MMS-1045), hUMBER (EX-mms-1030), Kilmorey (ex-MMS-1034), Mersey (ex-MMS-1075) and Montrose (ex-MMS-1077).

Six were transferred to the French Navy: D341 (ex-MMS-1069), D342 (ex-MMS-1054), D343 (ex-MMS-1065), D344 (ex-MMS-1055), D345 (ex-MMS-1070) and D346 (ex-MMS-1056). All were returned to the RN for disposal in October 1947.

Eight were transferred to the Royal Netherlands Navy: Duiveland (ex-MMS-1044), Ijselmond (ex-MMS-1026), Overflakee (ex-MMS-1046), Schokland (ex-MMS-1082), Tholen (ex-MMS-1014), Voorne (ex-MMS-1043), Wieringen (ex-MMS-1025) and Walcheren (ex-MMS-1042).

MMS-1085 and 1086 were transferred to the Royal Norwegian Navy, where they were named Orka and Vefsna, respectively They were retained postwar.

Of the 16 laid down for the RCN, Ash Lake, Birch Lake, Cherry Lake, Fir Lake, Maple Lake and Oak Lake, were cancelled. The remaining ten - Alder Lake, Beech Lake, Cedar Lake, Elm Lake, Hickory Lake, Larch Lake, Pine Lake, Poplar Lake, Spruce Lake and Willow Lake - were transferred to the Soviet Navy as T-193-202. Two others were transferred from the RN to the Soviet Navy: T-121 and 122 (ex-MMS-1005 and 1023).

MMS-1020 was loaned postwar to the Belgian Navy for use as a fishery protection vessel.

== Bibliography ==
- Blackman, Raymond V. B., ed. (1953). Jane's Fighting Ships 1953–54. New York: McGraw-Hill Book Company Inc. OCLC 473434104.
- Brown, David K. (2000). Nelson to Vanguard: Warship Design and Development 1923–1945. Barnsley, UK: Seaforth Publishing. ISBN 978-1-84832-149-6.
- Cowie, J. S. (1949). Mines, Minelayers and Minelaying. London: Oxford University Press. OCLC 2753706.
- Gardiner, Robert; Chesneau, Roger, eds. (1980). Conway's All The World's Fighting Ships 1922–1946. London: Conway Maritime Press. ISBN 0-85177-146-7.
- Preston, Antony (1989). Jane's Fighting Ships of World War II. London: Studio Publishing. ISBN 1-85170-194-X.
- Lenton, H. T.; Colledge, J. J. (1973). Warships of World War II (2nd ed.). London: Ian Allan. ISBN 0-7110-0403-X.
- McMurtrie, Francis E.; Blackman, Raymond V.B., eds. (1949). Jane's Fighting Ships 1949−50. New York: McGraw-Hill Book Company, Inc. OCLC 655148691.
- Worth, Jack (1984). British Warships Since 1945: Part 4: Minesweepers. Liskeard: Maritime Books. ISBN 0-907771-12-2.
