= HMS Oakley (L98) =

Destroyer of the Royal Navy

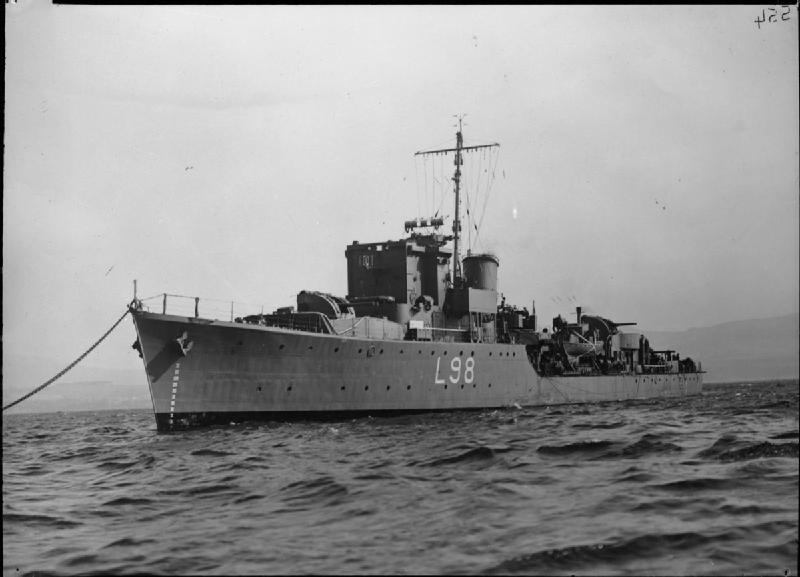
- HMS Oakley at anchor on the Clyde c1943 (IWM)

History

United Kingdom
- Name: HMS Oakley
- Ordered: 20 December 1939
- Builder: Yarrow & Co Ltd, Scotstoun
- Laid down: 19 August 1940
- Launched: 15 January 1942
- Commissioned: 7 May 1942
- Identification: Pennant number: L98
- Fate: Sold to West Germany, 11 November 1957
- Badge: On a Field Red, a bugle horn erect and an annulet interlaced Gold

History

West Germany
- Name: Gneisenau
- Acquired: 11 November 1957
- Commissioned: 18 October 1958
- Identification: Pennant number: F212
- Fate: Scrapped 1972

General characteristics
- Class & type: Type II Hunt-class destroyer
- Displacement: 1,050 long tons (1,070 t) standard, 1,490 long tons (1,510 t) full load
- Length: 264 ft 3 in (80.54 m) pp, 280 ft (85.34 m) oa
- Beam: 31 ft 6 in (9.60 m)
- Draught: 7 ft 9 in (2.36 m)
- Propulsion: 2 Admiralty 3-drum boilers; 2 shaft Parsons geared turbines, 19,000 shp (14,000 kW)
- Speed: 27 kn (50 km/h; 31 mph)
- Range: 3,700 nmi (6,900 km; 4,300 mi) at 14 kn (26 km/h; 16 mph)
- Complement: 168
- Armament: 6 × QF 4 in Mark XVI guns on twin mounts Mk. XIX; 4 × QF 2 pdr Mk. VIII (1 × quad mount); 2 × 20 mm Oerlikons; 110 depth charges

HMS Oakley was a Type II Hunt-class destroyer of the Royal Navy. She was originally to have been named Tickham; however, she was renamed after her sister ship Oakley was transferred to Poland and was renamed ORP Kujawiak (L72). She entered service in May 1943, carrying out convoy escort, patrol and anti-shipping attacks for most of the rest of the Second World War. She was adopted by the Civil community of Leighton Buzzard in Bedfordshire as part of Warship Week in 1942. In 1957, she was sold to the West German Navy, serving as a training ship for the German Naval Gunnery school until scrapped in 1972.

== Construction ==
HMS Oakley was ordered from Yarrows on 20 December 1939, one of 16 Type II Hunt-class destroyers ordered from various shipbuilders on that date, (including two from Yarrows). The Hunts were meant to fill the Royal Navy's need for a large number of small destroyer-type vessels capable of both convoy escort and operations with the fleet. The Type II Hunts differed from the earlier ships in having increased beam in order to improve stability (Note: A design error caused the first Hunt, Atherstone to be dangerously unstable when built. The first 23 Hunts had a twin 4-inch mount removed, the ships' superstructure cut down and ballast fitted in order to restore adequate stability.) and carry the ships' originally intended armament.

The ship intended to be HMS Tickham was laid down at Yarrow's Scotstoun, Glasgow shipyard on 19 August 1940, with construction being badly delayed by German bombing of the shipyard. On 3 April 1941 it was agreed that the original Oakley, under construction by Vickers-Armstrongs on the Tyne, would be transferred to the Polish Navy as the Kujawiak, with Tickham being renamed Oakley in her place. Oakley was launched on 15 January 1942 and completed on 7 May 1942.

Oakley was 264 feet 3 inches (80.54 m) long between perpendiculars and 280 feet (85.34 m) overall. The ship's beam was 31 feet 6 inches (9.60 m) and draught 7 feet 9 inches (2.36 m). Displacement was 1,050 long tons (1,070 t) standard and 1,490 long tons (1,510 t) under full load. Two Admiralty boilers raising steam at 300 pounds per square inch (2,100 kPa) and 620 °F (327 °C) fed Parsons single-reduction geared steam turbines that drove two propeller shafts, generating 19,000 shaft horsepower (14,000 kW) at 380 rpm. This gave a speed of 27 knots (50 km/h; 31 mph). 277 long tons (281 t) of oil were carried, giving a design range of 2,560 nautical miles (4,740 km; 2,950 mi) (although in service use, this dropped to 1,550 nautical miles (2,870 km; 1,780 mi)).

The ship's main gun armament was six 4 inch (102 mm) QF Mk XVI dual purpose (anti-ship and anti-aircraft) guns in three twin mounts, with one mount forward and two aft. Additional close-in anti-aircraft armament was provided by a quadruple 2-pounder "pom-pom" mount and two single Oerlikon 20 mm cannon mounted in the bridge wings. Power-operated twin 20 mm Oerlikon mounts replaced the single Oerlikons during the war. Up to 110 depth charges could be carried. (Note: While Lenton and Friedman both state a capacity of 110 depth charges, Gardiner and Chesneau give a capacity of 30 or 60 charges.) The ship had a complement of 168 officers and men.

== Royal Navy service ==
After rectification of defects found during the ship's sea trials, Oakley sailed for Scapa Flow in Orkney on 22 June 1942, and took part in escorting a minelaying operation and in a diversion operation intended to distract German attentions from the Arctic Convoy PQ 17. After completion of these operations, Oakley completed working up her crew, becoming a part of the Orkney and Shetland Command, where her main duties consisted of escorting convoys to and from the Faroe Islands. In September 1942, the Royal Navy sailed the next major supply convoy to the Soviet Union, Convoy PQ 18, and Oakley was again involved in support operations for the convoy. It was decided to set up a temporary refueling base for the convoy's escorts at Lowe Sound, Spitsbergen, with Oakley part of the escort for the oilers that carried out these refueling operations. On 17 November 1942, the westbound convoy QP 15 sailed from Arkhangelsk in Northern Russia, with Oakley joining the escort of the Loch Ewe bound convoy on 23 November, continuing with the convoy, which was heavily disrupted by storms, until it reached Scotland.

In early 1943, Oakley was allocated to service in the Mediterranean, and sailed as part of the escort of Algiers-bound convoy KMF 9, reaching Oran in Algeria on 16 February, where she joined the 59th Destroyer Division. Oakley's normal duties with the 59th Division consisted of convoy escort and patrol duties in the Western and Central Mediterranean. By the end of April 1943, Allied armies were closing in on German and Italian troops in Tunisia, and on 8 May Admiral Cunningham, commander of the British Mediterranean Fleet, ordered Operation Retribution, a blockade of Tunisian ports by Allied sea and air forces to stop any evacuation of Axis troops to Sicily, with 18 destroyers, including Oakley, forming part of the blockading force. On 9 May, Oakley and sister ship Bicester were operating off Cape Bon when, in a case of mistaken identity, the two destroyers were attacked by 18 Spitfire fighter aircraft, with Bicester receiving heavy damage from a near miss of a bomb.

On 8 July 1943, Oakley set out from Sfax in Tunisia as part of the escort of a convoy of 26 Landing Ship, Tanks carrying troops of the 51st (Highland) Division as part of the Allied invasion of Sicily. The convoy reached its assigned assault beach designated "Bark South", near Capo Passero at the South-east corner of Sicily on 10 July, with Oakley shelling Italian defences during the landings before returning to the duty of escorting transports between African ports and the invasion beaches. Oakley continued on escort duties in the Mediterranean for most of the rest of the year, but on 12 December, Oakley struck a submerged wreck (Note: While English states that Oakley struck a submerged wreck, Mason states that she stuck a rock.) at the entrance to Taranto harbor, seriously damaging the ship's hull and propellers.

Oakley was under repair at Taranto until April 1944, then sailed to Malta where she underwent a refit, rejoining the 59th Destroyer Division at Malta in June. In August 1944, Oakley took part in Operation Dragoon, the Allied Invasion of Southern France, continuing to escort convoys supporting the invasion until September 1944, when she returned to the 59th Division. In October 1944, Oakley took part in Operation Manna, the return of British and the forces of the Greek government-in-exile following the German withdrawal from Greece, supporting minesweeping operations and the re-occupation of Athens.

In January 1945, the naval threat in the Mediterranean having greatly reduced, Oakley returned to the United Kingdom, joining the 21st Destroyer Flotilla based at Sheerness for escort and patrol duties on the East coast of England before entering refit at Portsmouth in March that year. In April, Oakley, allocated to the East Indies Fleet, sailed to Taranto to complete the refit. The refit continued until September 1945, with Oakley returning to British waters in October. Oakley entered Category B reserve (for ships which were being kept for future service) at Portsmouth in December 1945. She underwent a refit in 1947, but remained in reserve until 1957 and transfer to the West German Navy.

Oakley was awarded battle honours for Arctic 1942, Sicily 1943, South France 1944 and North Sea 1945 for her service in the Second World War.

== West German Navy service ==
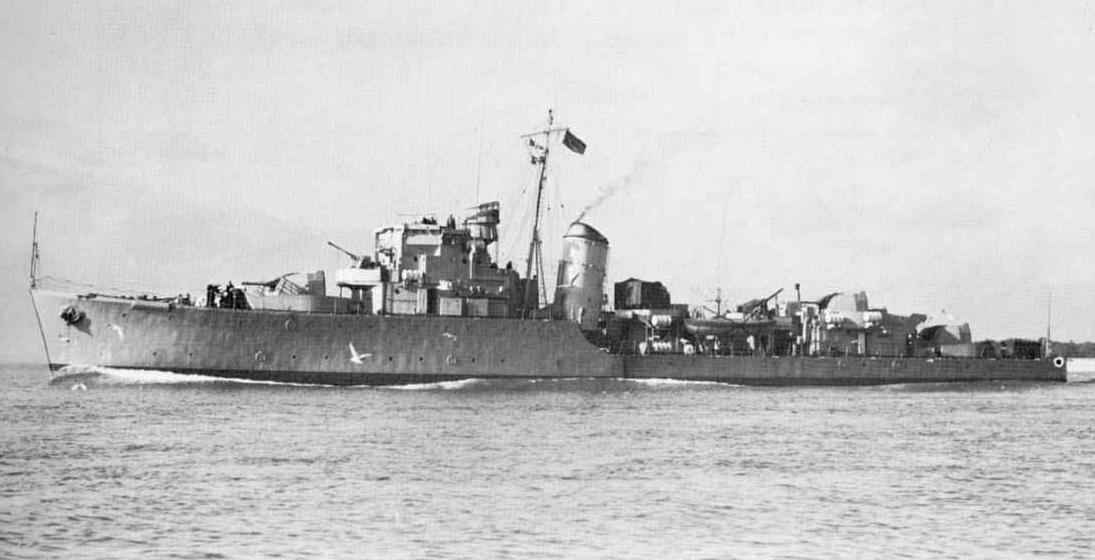
Gneisenau before rebuild with new armament

In May 1956, Oakley was one of seven frigates (Note: The Hunt class were re-designated as frigates in 1947.) selected for transfer to the new West German Navy for use as training ships, with the seven ships (Oakley, two Type II Hunts and four Black Swan class) being designated as Type 138 frigates by West Germany despite their dissimilar nature. Oakley was purchased by Germany on 11 November 1957, and refitted at Harland and Wolff at their Liverpool yard before being taken over on 2 October 1958. She was re-commissioned as Gneisenau (with the Pennant number F212) at Bremerhaven on 18 October 1958, serving as part of the Naval Gunnery School along with Scharnhorst (ex-Mermaid). Early changes included fitting with stabilisers, radar and a cowl funnel, with close-in anti-aircraft armament changing to two 40 mm Bofors guns. Gneiseneau was further modified in 1961, with anti-submarine armament being removed and the main gun armament being reduced by the removal of a 4-inch mount.

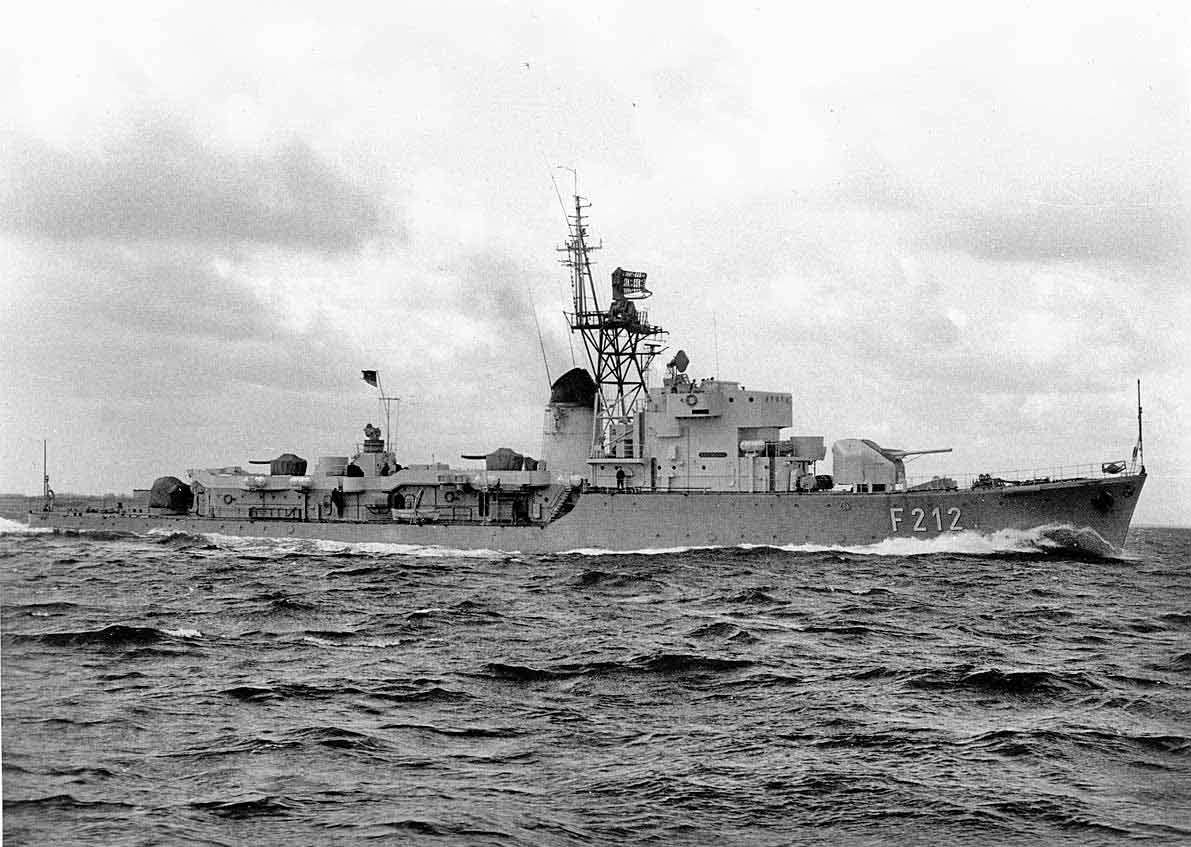
Gneisenau in 1967, after rearming

From 28 October 1962, Gneisenau underwent a major refit at Howaldtswerke, Kiel, with a more modern armament and sensor outfit being added, and the ship's superstructure and masts being rebuilt. The 4-inch guns and 40 mm Bofors mounts were removed, with a single French 100 mm naval gun forward, and a close-in anti-aircraft armament of four L/70 40 mm Bofors guns, in one twin and two single mounts. Dutch DA02 air search radar and M40 fire control systems were fitted. Gneisenau re-entered service after this rebuilt on 5 March 1964. In 1965, Gneisenau became a stationary training ship, and went into reserve in 1968. She was stricken on 30 September 1972 and was cannibalized for spare parts at Wilhelmshaven before being sold in October 1968 and scrapped from 18 January 1977.

== Publications ==
- Blackman, Raymond V.B. (1960). Jane's Fighting Ships 1960–61. London: Sampson Low, Marston & Co. Ltd. OCLC 852035262.
- Blackman, Raymond V.B. (1962). Jane's Fighting Ships 1962–63. London: Sampson Low, Marston & Co. Ltd. OCLC 181864290.
- Blackman, Raymond V.B. (1971). Jane's Fighting Ships 1971–72. London: Sampson Low, Marston & Co. Ltd. ISBN 0-354-00096-9.
- Colledge, J. J.; Warlow, Ben (2006) [1969]. Ships of the Royal Navy: The Complete Record of All Fighting Ships of the Royal Navy from the 15th Century to the Present (3rd Rev ed.). London: Chatham Publishing. ISBN 978-1-86176-281-8. OCLC 67375475.
- Critchley, Mike (1982). British Warships Since 1945: Part 3: Destroyers. Liskeard, UK: Maritime Books. ISBN 0-9506323-9-2.
- English, John (2001). Afridi to Nizam: British Fleet Destroyers 1937–43. Gravesend, UK: World Ship Society. ISBN 0-905617-95-0.
- English, John (1987). The Hunts: A history of the design, development and careers of the 86 destroyers of this class built for the Royal and Allied Navies during World War II. World Ship Society. ISBN 0-905617-44-4.
- Friedman, Norman (2008). British Destroyers and Frigates: The Second World War and After. Barnsley, UK: Seaforth Publishing. ISBN 978-1-84832-015-4.
- Gardiner, Robert; Chesneau, Roger, eds. (1980). Conway's All The World's Fighting Ships 1922–1946. London: Conway Maritime Press. ISBN 0-85177-146-7.
- Gardiner, Robert; Chumbley, Stephen, eds. (1995). Conway's All The World's Fighting Ships 1947–1995. Annapolis, Maryland, USA: Naval Institute Press. ISBN 1-55750-132-7.
- Lenton, H.T. (1970). Navies of the Second World War: British Fleet & Escort Destroyers Volume Two. London: Macdonald & Co. ISBN 0-356-03122-5.
- Rohwer, Jürgen; Hümmelchen, Gerhard (1992). Chronology of the War at Sea 1939–1945. London: Greenhill Books. ISBN 1-85367-117-7.
- Roskill, Stephen (1960). The War at Sea 1939–1945: Volume III: The Offensive Part I: 1st June 1943–31st May 1944. History of the Second World War: United Kingdom Military Series. London: Her Majesty's Stationery Office. OCLC 58588186.
- Ruegg, Bob; Hague, Arnold (1993). Convoys to Russia: 1941–1945. Kendal, UK: World Ship Society. ISBN 0-905617-66-5.
- Whitley, M.J. (2000). Destroyers of World War Two: An International Encyclopedia. London: Cassell & Co. ISBN 1-85409-521-8.
