= Hans-Joachim Horrer =

German navy officer and world war II U-boat commander

- Born: 6 February 1908; Dortmund, German Empire
- Died: 12 September 1942 (aged 34); Arctic Ocean
- Military career
- Allegiance: Weimar Republic; Nazi Germany
- Branch: Reichsmarine; Kriegsmarine
- Service years: 1933–42
- Rank: Korvettenkapitän
- Commands: U-555; U-589
- Conflicts: World War II
- Awards: Narvik Shield, Iron Cross 2nd Class, Iron Cross 1st Class

Hans-Joachim Horrer (6 February 1908 – 12 September 1942) was a German U-boat commander in World War II.

== Naval career ==
Hans-Joachim Horrer joined the Reichsmarine in 1933 and went through the usual officer training. He was a Gunnery Officer and Watch Officer on the destroyer Z9 Wolfgang Zenker from July 1938 to April 1940 when the destroyer was sunk during the fierce battles of Narvik, Norway. Horrer then started his U-boat officer training which lasted from July 1940 to January 1941. He was then assigned to the almost completed Type VIIC U-555 as Baubelehrung commander on 18 January, then taking command of the boat upon commission on 30 January 1941. He served on the boat until 25 August 1941 but never went on patrol. He again served as Baubelehrung commander from 26 August to 24 September 1941. He then took command of the new Type VIIC boat U-589. He went on eight patrols with the boat and was lost with his entire crew when the boat was sunk by depth charges from the British destroyer HMS Faulknor., and depth charges from a Fairey Swordfish aircraft of the British escort carrier Avenger, south-west of Spitzbergen on 12 September 1942.

== Summary of career ==
=== Ships sunk ===
Date	U-boat	Name of ship	Nationality	Tonnage	Fate
1 May 1942	U-589	Tsiolkovskij	Soviet Union	2,847	Sunk
11 October 1942	U-589	Musson (No 23)	Soviet Union	417	Sunk

=== Awards ===
- Narvik Shield
- Iron Cross 2nd Class
- Iron Cross 1st Class

== Bibliography ==
- Busch, Rainer; Röll, Hans-Joachim (1999). German U-boat commanders of World War II : a biographical dictionary. Translated by Brooks, Geoffrey. London, Annapolis, Md: Greenhill Books, Naval Institute Press. ISBN 1-55750-186-6.
- Smith, Peter (1968). Destroyer Leader: The Story of HMS Faulknor. London: William Kimber & Co.

Military offices
First	Commanding officer, U-555; 30 January 1941 – 25 August 1941	Succeeded by Kapitänleutnant Götz von Hartmann
First	Commanding officer, U-589; 25 September 1941 – 14 September 1942	Ship sunk
