= M-class destroyer =

Several classes of destroyer have been known as "M". These include:

- Admiralty M-class destroyer, a class of Royal Navy destroyers built 1913–1916 and that served in World War I
  - Hawthorn Leslie M-class destroyer, a variant of the above class
  - Thornycroft M-class destroyer, a variant of the Admiralty design
  - Yarrow M-class destroyer, a variant of the Admiralty design
- L and M-class destroyer, a class of Royal Navy destroyers launched 1939–1942 and that served in World War II
- Marcílio Dias-class destroyer, three ships of the Brazilian Navy that served in World War II

== See also ==
- M class (disambiguation)
