= SS Esek Hopkins =

Liberty ship of WWII

History

United States
- Name: Esek Hopkins
- Namesake: Esek Hopkins
- Owner: War Shipping Administration (WSA)
- Operator: Moore-McCormack Lines, Inc.
- Ordered: as type (EC2-S-C1) hull, MCE hull 34
- Awarded: 14 March 1941
- Builder: Bethlehem-Fairfield Shipyard, Baltimore, Maryland
- Cost: $1,108,418
- Yard number: 2021
- Way number: 9
- Laid down: 28 January 1942
- Launched: 27 April 1942
- Completed: 23 May 1942
- Identification: Call sign: KEUC
- Fate: Sold for scrapping, 27 April 1967

General characteristics
- Class & type: Liberty ship; type EC2-S-C1, standard
- Tonnage: 10,865 LT DWT; 7,176 GRT
- Displacement: 3,380 long tons (3,434 t) (light); 14,245 long tons (14,474 t) (max)
- Length: 441 feet 6 inches (135 m) oa; 416 feet (127 m) pp; 427 feet (130 m) lwl
- Beam: 57 feet (17 m)
- Draft: 27 ft 9.25 in (8.4646 m)
- Installed power: 2 × Oil fired 450 °F (232 °C) boilers, operating at 220 psi (1,500 kPa); 2,500 hp (1,900 kW)
- Propulsion: 1 × triple-expansion steam engine, (manufactured by Clark Bros. Co., Cleveland, Ohio); 1 × screw propeller
- Speed: 11.5 knots (21.3 km/h; 13.2 mph)
- Capacity: 562,608 cubic feet (15,931 m^{3}) (grain); 499,573 cubic feet (14,146 m^{3}) (bale)
- Complement: 38–62 USMM; 21–40 USNAG
- Armament: Varied by ship; Bow-mounted 3-inch (76 mm)/50-caliber gun; Stern-mounted 4-inch (102 mm)/50-caliber gun; 2–8 × single 20-millimeter (0.79 in) Oerlikon anti-aircraft (AA) cannons and/or, 2–8 × 37-millimeter (1.46 in) M1 AA guns

SS Esek Hopkins was a Liberty ship built in the United States during World War II. She was named after Esek Hopkins, the only Commander in Chief of the Continental Navy during the American Revolutionary War. He was also an accomplished merchant captain and privateer. He is noted for his successful raid on the British port of Providence, in the Bahamas, and capturing large stores of military supplies.

== Construction ==
Esek Hopkins was laid down on 28 January 1942, under a Maritime Commission (MARCOM) contract, MCE hull 34, by the Bethlehem-Fairfield Shipyard, Baltimore, Maryland; and was launched on 27 April 1942.

== History ==
She was allocated to Moore-McCormack Lines, Inc., on 23 May 1942. On 17 May 1948, she was laid up in the National Defense Reserve Fleet, Mobile, Alabama. On 27 April 1967, she was sold for scrapping to Union Minerals & Alloys Corp., for $45,501. She was withdrawn from the fleet on 13 May 1967.

== Bibliography ==
- "Bethlehem-Fairfield, Baltimore MD". www.ShipbuildingHistory.com. 14 August 2008.
- Maritime Administration. "Esek Hopkins". Ship History Database Vessel Status Card. U.S. Department of Transportation, Maritime Administration.
- Davies, James (May 2004). "Specifications (As-Built)" (PDF). p. 23.
- "SS Esek Hopkins".
