= SS Mary Luckenbach (1918) =

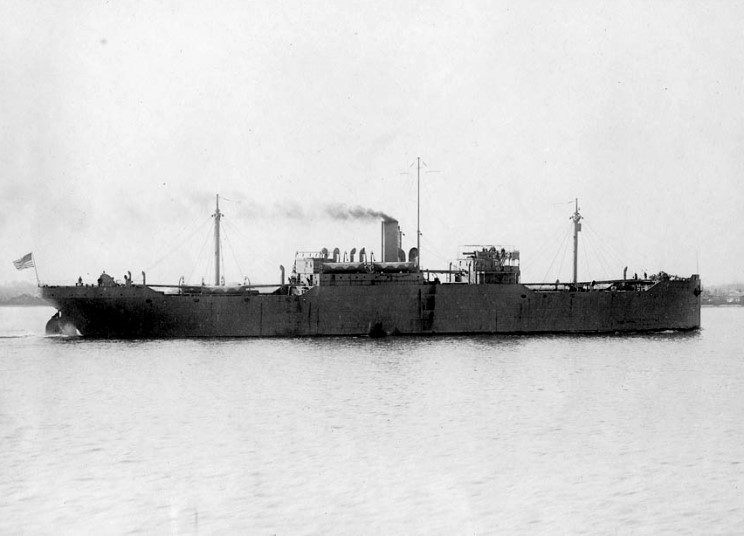
- USS Sac City at Hog Island Shipyard 6 January 1919.

History

United States
- Name: USS Sac City
- Namesake: Sac City, Iowa
- Builder: American International Shipbuilding Corp., Hog Island, Pennsylvania
- Laid down: 11 March 1918
- Launched: 30 September 1918
- Acquired: 6 January 1919
- Commissioned: 6 January 1919
- Decommissioned: 17 June 1919
- Renamed: SS Black Falcon (1932); SS Mary Luckenbach (1941)
- Fate: Sunk 13 September 1942

General characteristics
- Class & type: Design 1022 cargo ship
- Displacement: 6,629 long tons (6,735 t) light
- Length: 401 ft (122 m)
- Beam: 54 ft 2 in (16.51 m)
- Draft: 24 ft 5 in (7.44 m)
- Propulsion: Geared steam turbine, single screw, 2,500 shp (1,864 kW)
- Speed: 11.5 knots (21.3 km/h; 13.2 mph)
- Complement: 189 officers and enlisted
- Armament: 2 × single 5"/38 caliber guns; 4 × single 3"/50 caliber guns; 8 × 20 mm AA guns

SS Mary Luckenbach, was a cargo ship of the United States Navy. She was launched in 1918 and completed the following year by the American International Shipbuilding Corp., Hog Island, Pennsylvania as USS Sac City (ID-3861).

== Service history ==
The U.S. Navy commissioned USS Sac City on 6 January 1919. At the end of January 1919, the ship sailed from Norfolk, Virginia, with a cargo destined for Montevideo, Uruguay. The ship arrived at Montevideo at the beginning of March 1919. She moved to the nearby port of Rosario, and loaded a private commercial cargo, which she took to Gibraltar. She sailed to New York City from Gibraltar in June 1919.

Sac City was decommissioned on 17 June 1919 and transferred to the United States Shipping Board. She then entered commercial service as SS Sac City.

Sac City ran aground in the Scheldt at Walsoorden, Zeeland, the Netherlands, on 9 December 1926. She was refloated on 16 December 1926.

On 11 March 1927, Sac City was steaming in New York Harbor in dense fog when she collided with the Morgan Line cargo ship SS El Sol. El Sol, inbound to New York with a $1,000,000 cargo of pig iron, copper, and bales of cotton, was maneuvering into position to anchor to wait for the fog to lift when the collision occurred at about 07:45. Sac City hit a glancing blow to El Sol, bounced off, and then struck El Sol a second time, ripping through El Sol's plating. Sac City's bow had some slight damage, but El Sol sank quickly in about 60 feet (18 m) of water about a half-mile (800 m) south of the Statue of Liberty. Out of El Sol's crew of 45 men, 44 were rescued; the ship's carpenter, who could not swim, was last seen clutching the ship's rail as it went below the surface. El Sol settled on the bottom at a 45° angle with only the tops of her masts protruding above the surface. In hearings before the United States Steamboat Inspection Service, the captain of Sac City and Captain Charles H. Knowles of El Sol both were cleared of wrongdoing in the collision, and the blame was laid on the heavy fog.

During her subsequent commercial service, the ship was sold to the Black Diamond Steamship Company and renamed SS Black Falcon in 1932. She was later sold to the Luckenbach Steamship Co. of New York and renamed SS Mary Luckenbach in 1941.

In September 1942, Mary Luckenbach was part of Convoy PQ 18, a convoy of 40 merchant ships under heavy escort transiting the Barents Sea en route to Murmansk in the Soviet Union. On 14 September 1942 (some sources list 13 September), the convoy was west of North Cape, Norway, when Mary Luckenbach was attacked by several German Junkers Ju 88 torpedo bomber aircraft and was hit by an aerial torpedo. The impact of the torpedo detonated the ship's cargo of 1,000 tons of TNT, vaporizing her along with her entire crew of 41 and the 24 personnel of the United States Navy Armed Guard assigned to her. Her sinking is described in the memoir of Robert Hughes, a gunnery officer on HMS Scylla. The last known location of the ship was at 75°N 10°E.
