= SS Exford =

SS Exford may refer to one of several ships of American Export Lines:

- SS Exford (1918) (USSB hull number 1371, Design 1019), a later name (1928–33) of West Carnifax built by Southwestern Shipbuilding; served in United States Navy at the end of World War I as USS West Carnifax (ID-3812); renamed Pan Royal, 1933; sunk after collision, February 1943
- SS Exford (1919), (USSB hull number 1483, the Design 1022), a later name (1940–44) of SS Hog Island built by American International Shipbuilding; named Express from 1928–1940; scuttled as a breakwater at Normandy, August 1944
- SS Exford (1946) (USMC hull number 2795, Type C3-S-A3), built by Bethlehem Sparrows Point Shipyard; delivered May 1946; scrapped in 1976
