= HMS Bergamot (K189) =

Flower-class corvette

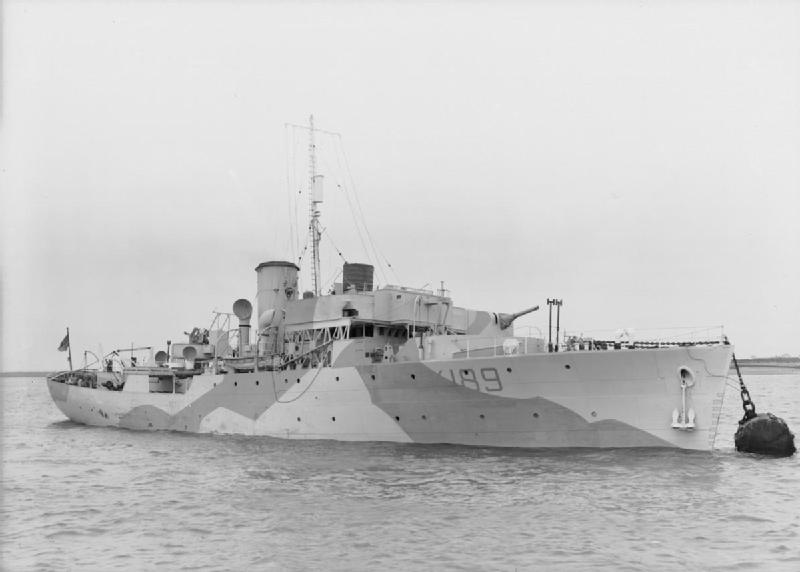
- HMS Bergamot in July 1942

History

United Kingdom
- Name: HMS Bergamot
- Builder: Harland and Wolff
- Yard number: 1100
- Laid down: 15 October 1940
- Launched: 15 February 1941
- Completed: 9 May 1941
- Commissioned: 12 May 1941
- Identification: Pennant number: K189
- Fate: Sold May 1946 for mercantile service, scrapped 1974

General characteristics
- Class & type: Flower-class corvette

HMS Bergamot was a Flower-class corvette that served in the Royal Navy.

== Construction ==
She was laid down at Harland and Wolff in Belfast on 15 October 1940 and launched on 15 February 1941. Her commissioning followed on 12 May of the same year. Her pennant number was K189.

== Royal Navy wartime service ==
Her main duty was as a convoy escort and in this capacity she crossed the Atlantic - North and South - several times, escorting convoys to and from the United Kingdom.

On two occasions Bergamot was involved in Arctic convoys to the Soviet Union, once to Murmansk and once to Archangel. Most notably she took part in convoy PQ 18, sailing all the way from Loch Ewe in Scotland to Russia, subjected for days on end to attacks by German aircraft.

She sailed from Liverpool with the convoy which initiated the Allied invasion of Sicily in 1943 (Operation Husky). From then on the Mediterranean was her home: escorting supplies to Tobruk; being involved in the invasions at Salerno in September 1943 and Anzio in January 1944; she was also present when the Italian fleet surrendered to the Allies.

== Post-war mercantile service ==
After the war she was sold in May 1946 to a Greek company and became a ferry, carrying passengers between the various Greek islands. She belonged to different companies and had different names – Syros, Delphini and Ekaterina. She was broken up in 1974.
