= Comely Bank =

Area of Edinburgh, Scotland

Coordinates: 55°57′30″N 3°13′9″W

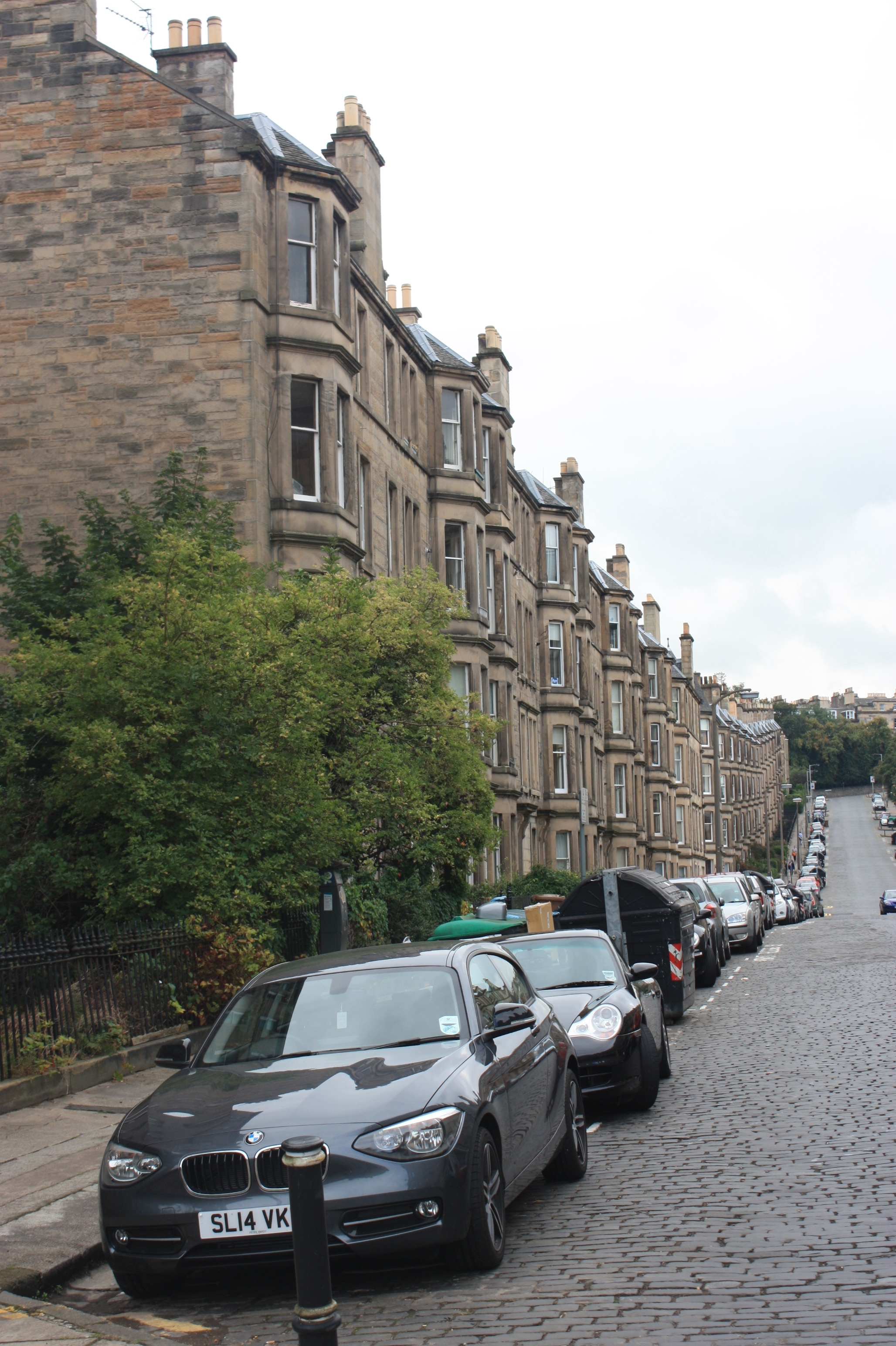
Tenements, Comely Bank

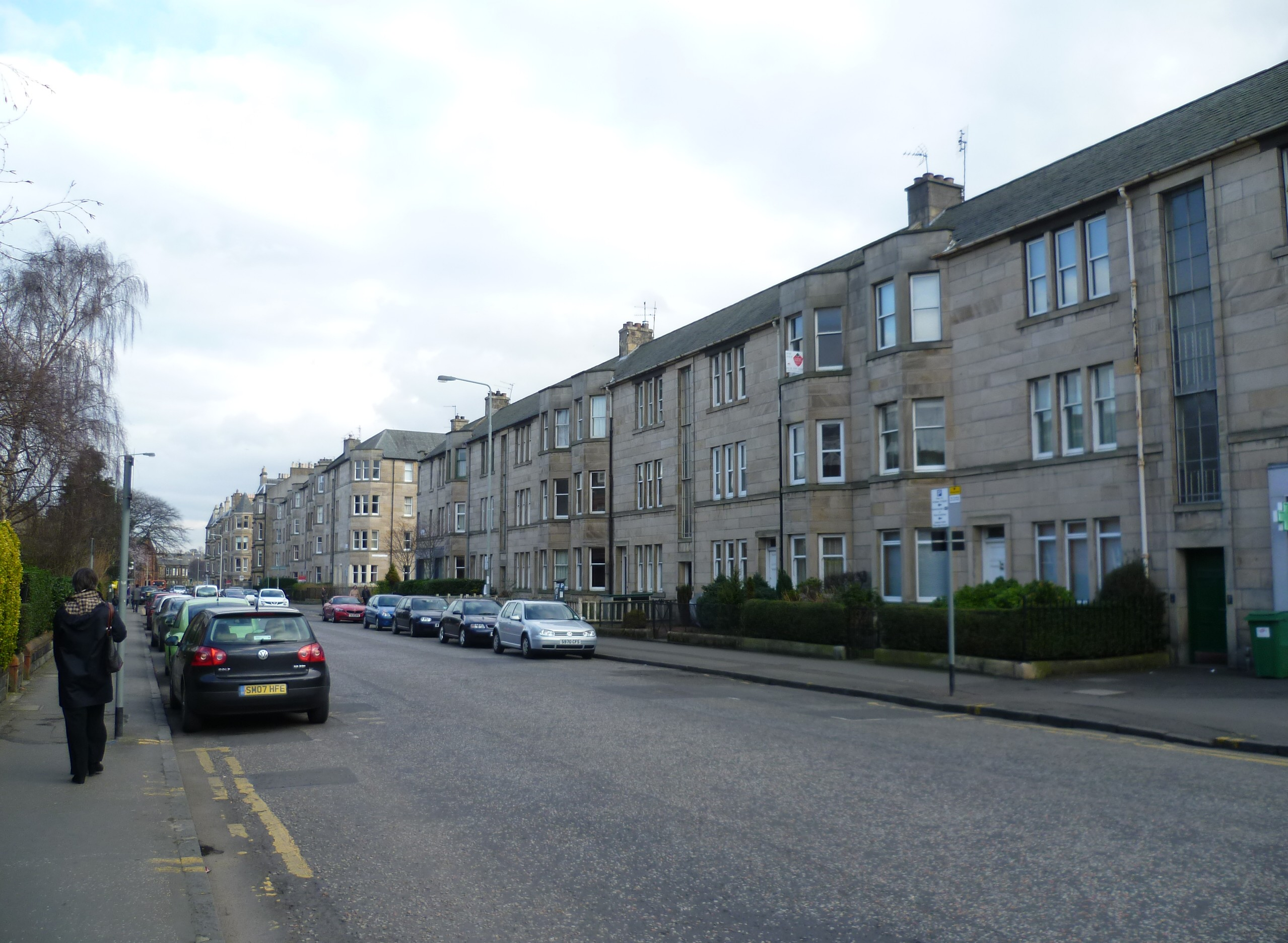
Comely Bank Road

Comely Bank (/ˌkɒmɪli ˈbæŋk/; Scottish Gaelic: Bruach Cheanalta, IPA:[ˈpɾuəxˈçɛnəɫ̪t̪ʰə]) is an area of Edinburgh, the capital of Scotland. It lies southwest of Royal Botanic Garden and is situated between Stockbridge and Craigleith. It is bound on its northernmost point by Carrington Road and on its southernmost point by Learmonth Terrace. The area is covered by Stockbridge and Inverleith Community Council.

== History ==
The ground was originally part of Sir William Fettes' estate. The original development was a terrace of Georgian town-houses built to face the main east–west road leading to Stockbridge. This was designed by Thomas Brown (architect) in 1817 and still stands today.

The Victorian writer Thomas Carlyle lived at 21 Comely Bank Road from 1826 to 1828 with his wife Jane Carlyle. At that time, the terrace at the western end of the road was the last row of houses in Edinburgh before the village of Blackhall.

In 1894 the builder Sir James Steel bought the then empty 33-acre (13.5-hectare) site between Comely Bank and Queensferry Road and developed it as high density but high quality four storey tenements. He later served as Lord Provost of Edinburgh. Construction continued after his death in 1904. It ceased altogether during the First World War and was not completed until the 1930s.

== Notable buildings ==
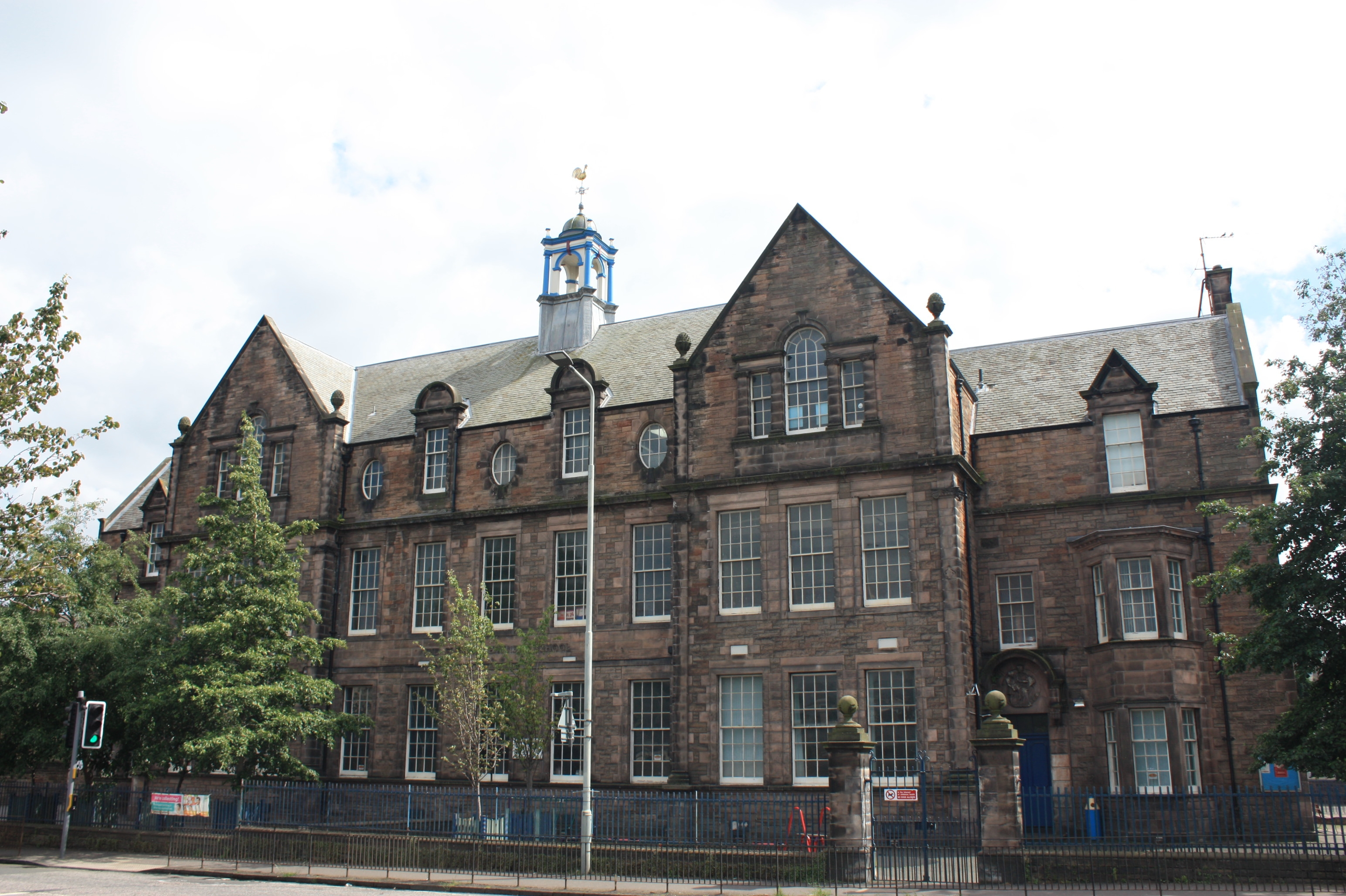
Flora Stevenson School, Comely Bank Edinburgh by John Alexander Carfrae

The area has a number of buildings of architectural or historical interest:

- Flora Stevenson School 1900 by John Alexander Carfrae
- St Stephen's Church 1901 by J.N. Scott & Alexander Lorne Campbell
- St Ninian's Episcopal Church 1921 by John More Dick Peddie & Walker Todd

== Famous residents ==
(taken from Grant's Old and New Edinburgh)

- Thomas Carlyle
- Jane Welsh Carlyle
- Rev James Browne DD (1793–1841) author, lived at 11 Comely Bank
- John Wilson Ewbank RSA (1799–1847), artist, lived at 5 Comely Bank
- Thomas Faed and James Faed artist brothers lived at 16 Comely Bank

== Street names ==
Nearly all of the street names in Comely Bank begin 'Comely Bank' or 'Learmonth'. The City of Edinburgh Council's current street naming policy no longer permits this type of naming strategy. Some of the street names have changed over the years, for example Learmonth Grove was known as Comely Bank Loan until the early 20th century.

== Comely Bank Cemetery ==
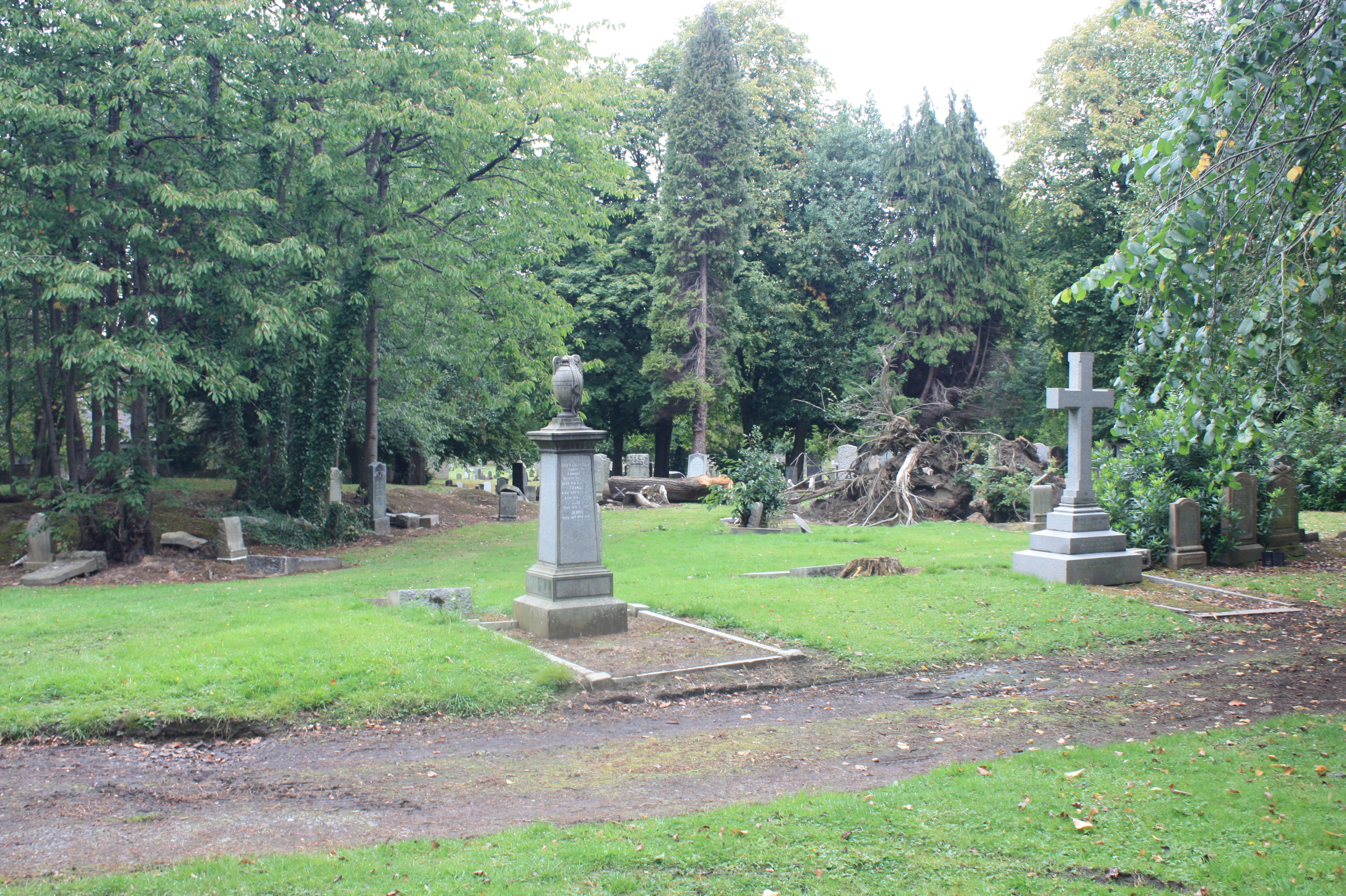
Comely Bank Cemetery, Edinburgh

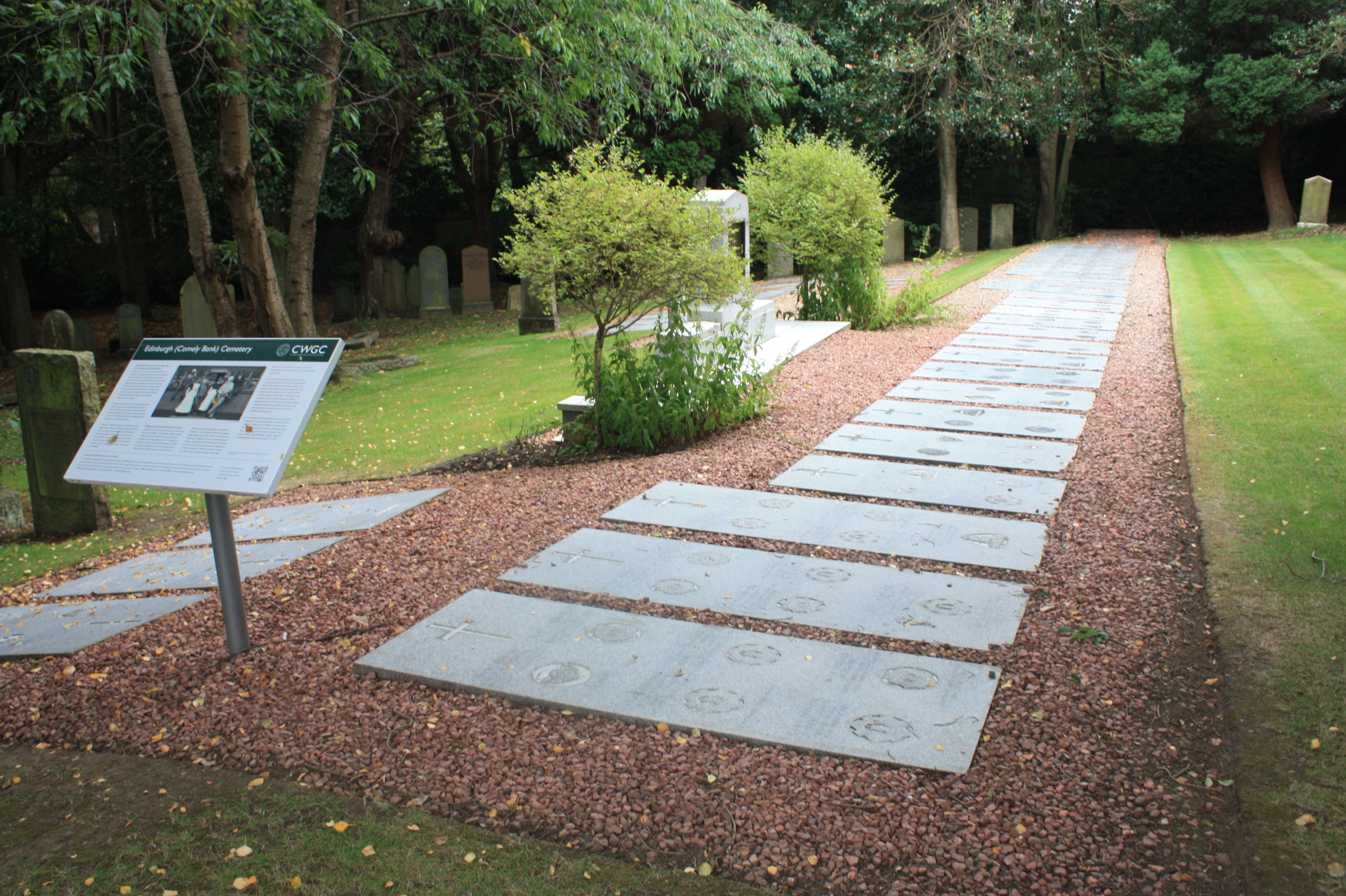
War graves, Comely Bank Cemetery

The cemetery was begun in 1896 and laid out by George Washington Browne.

The cemetery has lost its original southern entrance and its ornate gate piers now lead only into a modern housing estate. It is now only accessible from its north-east corner, on Crewe Road. There has been much vandalism in the cemetery.

It is notable largely due to an abnormally high number of war graves, due to its juxtaposition to two of the city's hospitals in WW2. This includes Britain's youngest in-service death: Reginald Earnshaw only 14 years old.

There are relatively few graves of note:-

- Jeannie Cockburn (1898–1918) a rare female war grave from WW1 (Lady Driver)
- Clive Franklyn Collett MC and bar (1886–1917) WW1 flying ace
- Sir Patrick George Don-Wauchope Baronet (1898–1989)
- Reginald Earnshaw (1927–41) Merchant Navy. UK's youngest war grave
- William Miller Frazer RSA (1864–1961), landscape artist
- William Murray Frier (1911–2014) centenarian
- Alexander Gamley (died 1906) and Fanny Vince Gamley (died 1908) stone by Henry Snell Gamley (presumed to be his parents)
- John Rose Murray (1989-1991), member of House of Representatives of Ceylon
- John ("Jock") Adam Porter (1894–1952) Scotland's first Isle of Man TT winner
- Thomas Ross (1839–1930) architect and partner in MacGibbon & Ross (stone fallen and damaged)
- Dr Arthur Wilson (died 1925) sculpture by Henry Snell Gamley
