= Claude Auchinleck =

British field marshal (1884–1981)

Sir Claude Auchinleck GCB GCIE CSI DSO OBE
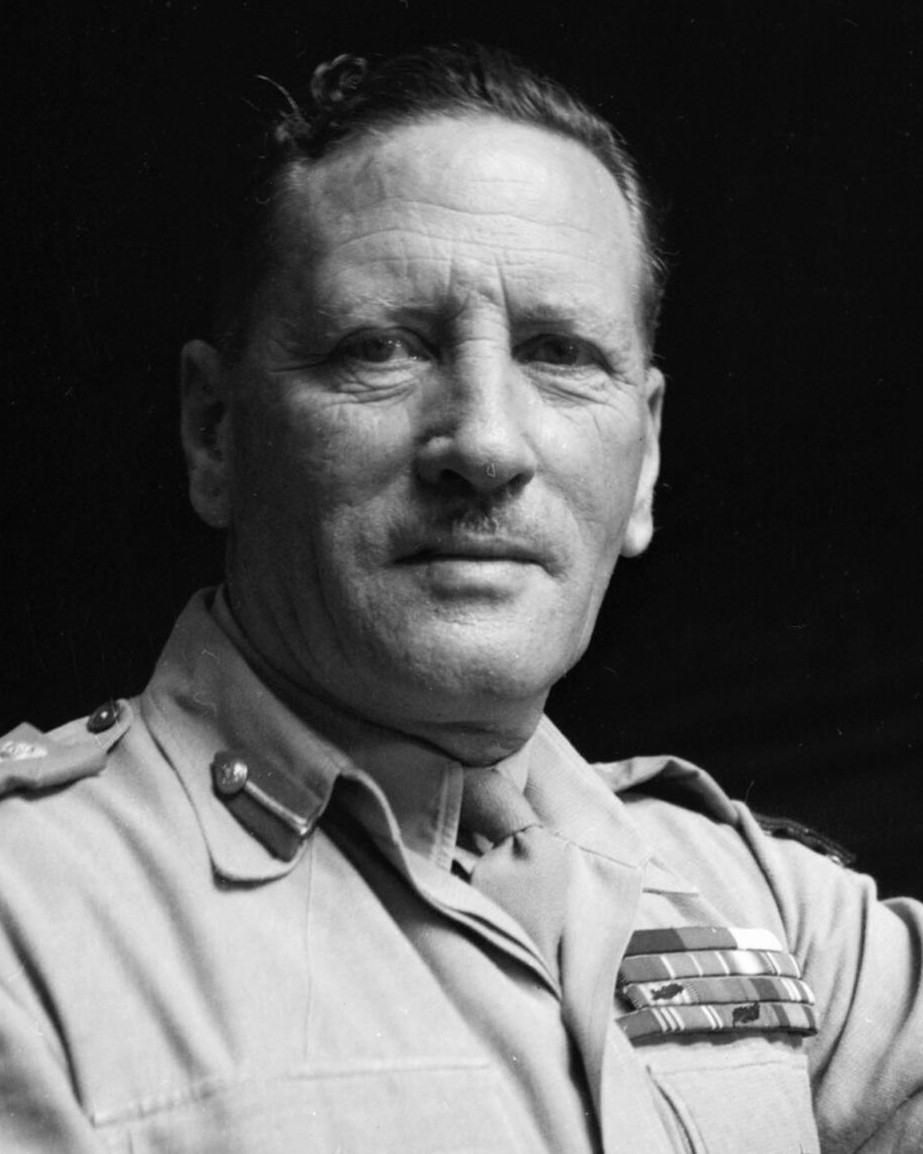
- Portrait by Cecil Beaton, c. 1945
- Born: 21 June 1884; Aldershot, Hampshire, England (Note: Other sources, including the online Dictionary of Ulster Biography Archived 6 July 2007 at the Wayback Machine, wrongly state that Auchinleck was born in County Fermanagh, Ulster)
- Died: 23 March 1981 (aged 96); Marrakesh, Morocco
- Military career
- Allegiance: United Kingdom
- Branch: British Indian Army; Indian Army; Pakistan Army
- Service years: 1904–1947
- Rank: Field Marshal
- Nickname: The Auk
- Service number: 115611
- Unit: 62nd Punjabis
- Commands: Supreme Commander India and Pakistan (1947–1948); Commander-in-Chief, India (1941, 1943–1947); Middle East Command (1941–1942); Southern Command (1940); V Corps (1940); Commander-in-chief, Northern Norway (1940); IV Corps (1940); 3rd Indian Infantry Division (1939); Meerut district (1938); Peshawar Brigade (1933–1936); 1st Battalion, 1st Punjab Regiment (1929–1930)
- Conflicts: First World War; Mesopotamian campaign; Battle of Hanna; Second Battle of Kut; Fall of Baghdad; Mohmand campaign; Second World War; Norwegian campaign; North African campaign
- Awards: Knight Grand Cross of the Order of the Bath; Knight Grand Cross of the Order of the Indian Empire; Companion of the Order of the Star of India; Companion of the Distinguished Service Order; Officer of the Order of the British Empire; Mentioned in Despatches (3); Chief Commander of the Legion of Merit (USA); Virtuti Militari (Poland); Order of the Star of Nepal (Nepal); Knight Grand Cross of Order of St. Olav (Norway); Military Cross (Czechoslovakia); Croix de guerre (France)
- Other work: Colonel 1st Battalion 1st Punjab Regiment (January 1933): Colonel Royal Inniskilling Fusiliers (April 1941); Colonel 1st Battalion 4th Bombay Grenadiers (July 1939); Colonel 4th Bombay Grenadiers (May 1944); Colonel 1st Punjab Regiment (1947)

Field Marshal Sir Claude John Eyre Auchinleck (/ˌɒxɪnˈlɛk/ OKH-in-LEK; 21 June 1884 – 23 March 1981) was a British Indian Army commander who saw active service during both World War I and World War II. A career soldier who spent much of his military career in India, he rose to become commander-in-chief of the Indian Army by early 1941 during the Second World War. In July 1941 he was appointed commander-in-chief of the Middle East Theatre, but after initial successes, the war in North Africa turned against the British-led forces under his command and he was relieved of the post in August 1942 during the North African campaign.

In June 1943, he was once again appointed Commander-in-Chief, India, where his support through the organisation of supply, maintenance and training for General William Slim's Fourteenth Army played an important role in its success. He served as commander-in-chief, India, until the Partition in 1947, when he assumed the role of supreme commander of all British forces in India and Pakistan until late 1948.

== Early life and career ==
Born at 89 Victoria Road in Aldershot, Hampshire, the son of John Claud Alexander Auchinleck and Mary Eleanor (Eyre) Auchinleck. His father, a colonel in the Royal Horse Artillery of the British Army, was posted to Bangalore in British India, with his family accompanying him, while Claude was very young. It was from here that he developed a love for the country that would last for most of his life. Returning to England after the death of his father in 1892, Auchinleck attended Eagle House School at Crowthorne and then Wellington College on scholarships. From there he went on to the Royal Military College, Sandhurst and was commissioned as an unattached second lieutenant in the Indian Army on 21 January 1903, and joined the 62nd Punjabis in April 1904. He soon learned several Indian languages, and, able to speak fluently with his soldiers, he absorbed a knowledge of local dialects and customs: this familiarity engendered a lasting mutual respect, enhanced by his own personality.

He was promoted to lieutenant on 21 April 1905, and then spent the next two years in Tibet and Sikkim before moving to Benares in 1907 where he caught diphtheria. After briefly serving with the Royal Inniskilling Fusiliers at Aldershot he returned to Benares in 1909 and became adjutant of the 62nd Punjabis with promotion to captain on 21 January 1912. Auchinleck was an active freemason.

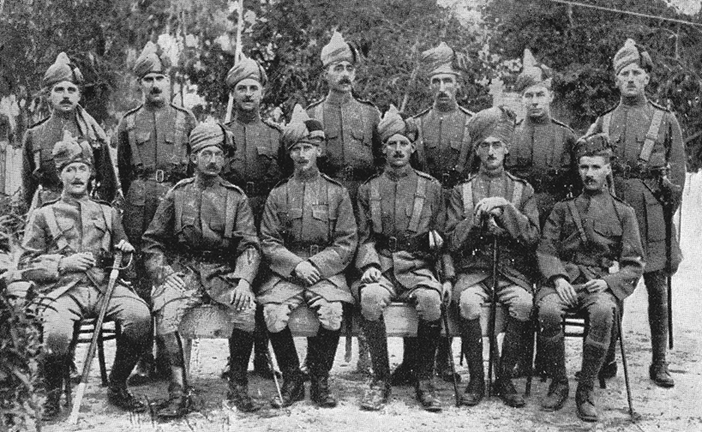
Officers of the 62nd Punjabis in Ismailia, Egypt, 1914. Captain Claude Auchinleck is standing on the far right.

== First World War ==
Auchinleck saw active service in the First World War and was deployed with his regiment to defend the Suez Canal: in February 1915 he was in action against the Turks at Ismailia. His regiment moved into Aden to counter the Turkish threat there in July 1915. The 6th Indian Division, of which the 62nd Punjabis were a part, was landed at Basra on 31 December 1915 for the Mesopotamian campaign. In July 1916 Auchinleck was promoted acting major and made second in command of his battalion. He took part in a series of fruitless attacks on the Turks at the Battle of Hanna in January 1916 and was one of the few British officers in his regiment to survive these actions.

He became acting commanding officer of his battalion in February 1917 and led his regiment at the Second Battle of Kut in February 1917 and the Fall of Baghdad in March 1917. Having been mentioned in despatches and having been appointed a Companion of the Distinguished Service Order in 1917 for his service in Mesopotamia, he was promoted to the substantive rank of major on 21 January 1918, to temporary lieutenant-colonel on 23 May 1919 and to brevet lieutenant-colonel on 15 November 1919 for his "distinguished service in Southern and Central Kurdistan" on the recommendation of the Commander-in-Chief of the Mesopotamia Expeditionary Force.

== Between the world wars ==
Auchinleck attended the Staff College, Quetta, between 1920 and 1921. As a lieutenant colonel, he outranked most of his fellow students and even some members of the staff. Despite performing well there – passing the course and being among the top ten students – he was critical of many aspects of the college, which he believed to be too theoretical and with little emphasis being placed on matters such as supply and administration, both of which he thought had been mishandled in the campaign in Mesopotamia. He married Jessie Stewart (1900-1983) in 1921. Jessie had been born in 1900 in Tacoma, Washington, to Alexander Stewart, head of the Blue Funnel Line that plied the west coast of the United States. When he died about 1919, their mother took her, her twin brother Alan and her younger brother Hepburne back to Bun Rannoch, the family estate at Innerhadden in Perthshire. Holidaying at Grasse on the French Riviera, Auchinleck, who was on leave from India at the time, met Jessie on the tennis courts. She was a high-spirited, blue-eyed beauty. Things moved quickly, and they were married within five months. Sixteen years younger than Auchinleck, Jessie became known as 'the little American girl' in India, but adapted readily to life there. They had no children.

Auchinleck became temporary deputy assistant quartermaster general at Army Headquarters in February 1923 and then second-in-command of his regiment, which in the 1923 reorganisation of the Indian Army had become the 1st Punjab Regiment, in September 1925. He attended the Imperial Defence College in 1927 and, having been promoted to the permanent rank of lieutenant-colonel on 21 January 1929 he was appointed to command his regiment. Promoted to full colonel on 1 February 1930 with seniority from 15 November 1923, he became an instructor at the Staff College, Quetta in February 1930 where he remained until April 1933.

He was promoted to temporary brigadier on 1 July 1933 and given command of the Peshawar Brigade, which was active in the pacification of the adjacent tribal areas during the Mohmand and Bajaur Operations between July and October 1933: during his period of command he was mentioned in despatches. He led a second punitive expedition during the Second Mohmand Campaign in August 1935 for which he was again mentioned in despatches, promoted to major-general on 30 November 1935 and appointed a Companion of the Order of the Star of India on 8 May 1936.

On leaving his brigade command in April 1936, Auchinleck was on the unemployed list (on half pay) until September 1936 when he was appointed Deputy Chief of the General Staff and Director of Staff Duties in Delhi. He was then appointed to command the Meerut District in India in July 1938. In 1938 Auchinleck was appointed to chair a committee to consider the modernisation, composition and re-equipment of the British Indian Army: the committee's recommendations formed the basis of the 1939 Chatfield Report which outlined the transformation of the Indian Army – it grew from 183,000 in 1939 to over 2,250,000 men by the end of the war.

== Second World War ==
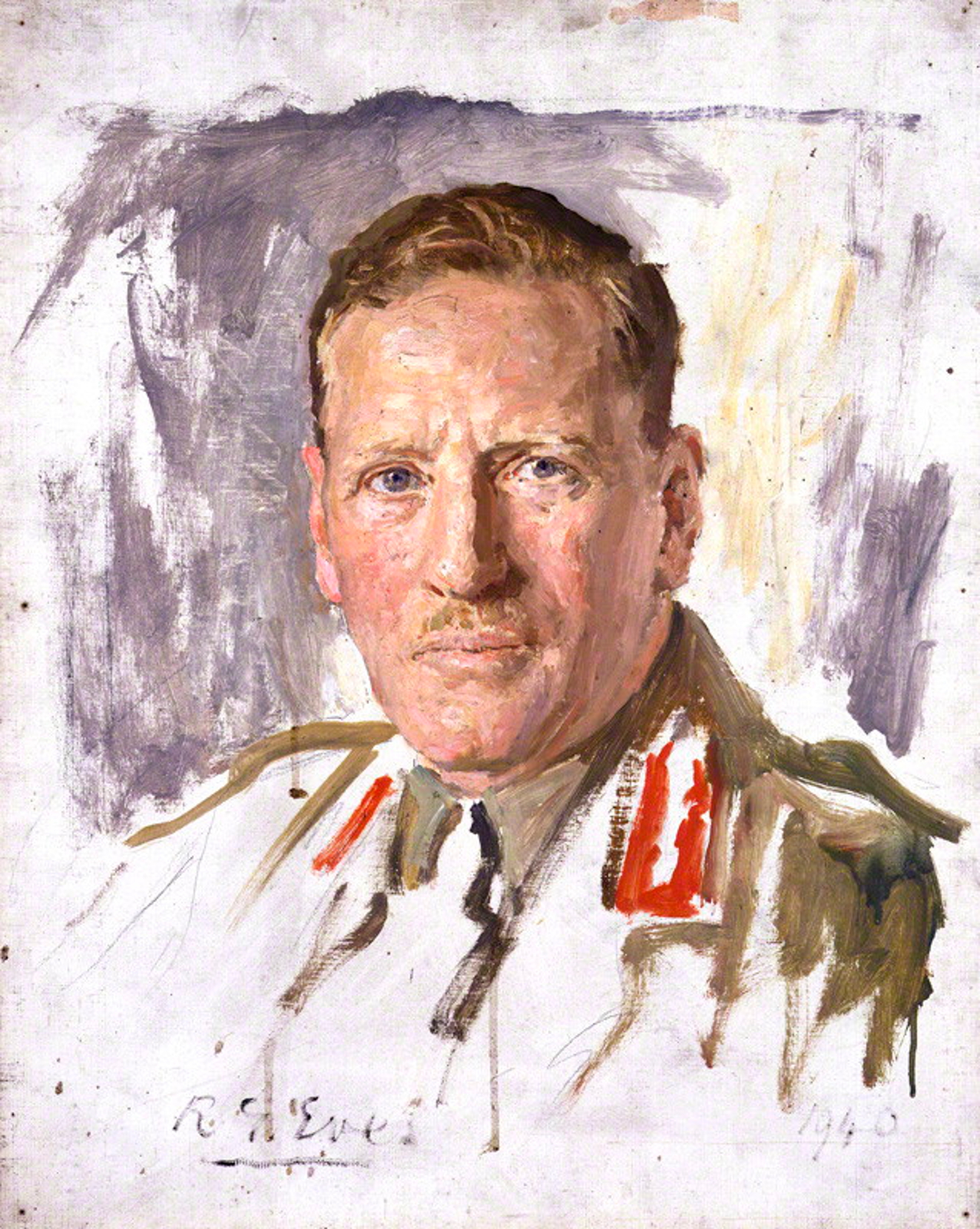
A 1940 portrait of Auchinleck by Reginald Grenville Eves.

=== Norway 1940 ===
On the outbreak of war, Auchinleck was appointed to command the Indian 3rd Infantry Division, but in January 1940 was summoned to the United Kingdom to command IV Corps, the only time in the war that a wholly British corps was commanded by an Indian Army officer. He received promotion to acting lieutenant general on 1 February 1940 and to the substantive rank of lieutenant general on 16 March 1940. In May 1940 Auchinleck took over command of the Anglo-French ground forces during the Norwegian campaign, a military operation that was doomed to fail.

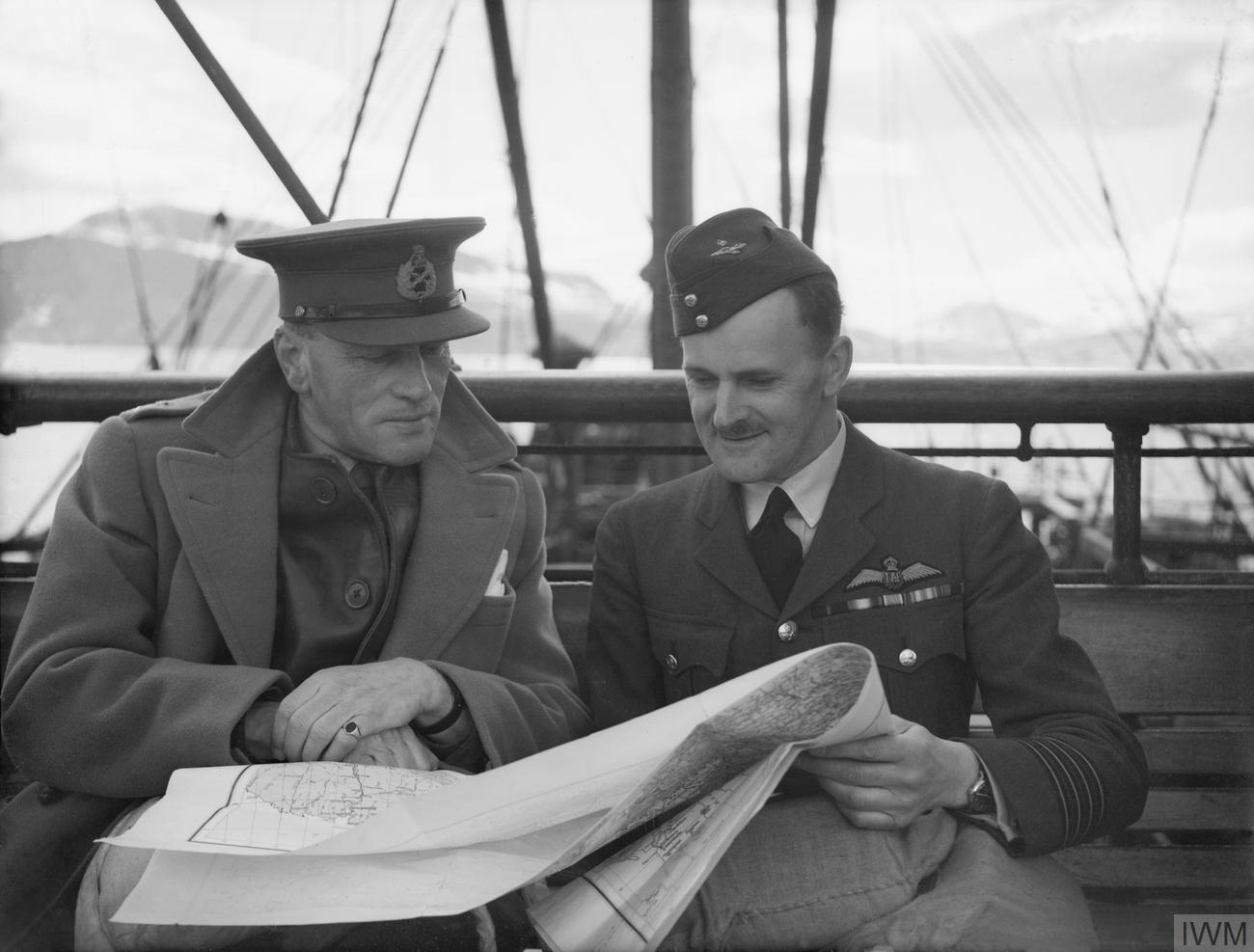
Lieutenant General Claude Auchinleck, the C-in-C of the North Western Expeditionary Force, and Group Captain Moor looking over maps on board the Polish Navy troopship MS Chrobry before docking in Harstad.

Auchinleck arrived in Greenock, after the fall of Norway, on 12 June, by which time the Battle of France was nearing its end, with the majority of the BEF in France having been evacuated from the port of Dunkirk, with the French surrender only a few days away. Due to these reasons, all attention was now given to the defence of the UK which many believed would soon be invaded by the Germans (see Operation Sea Lion). In mid-June he was given command of the recently established V Corps, then serving in Southern Command under Lieutenant General Sir Alan Brooke. His stay was not to be for very long, however, as, just a few weeks later, Brooke succeeded General Sir Edmund Ironside as Commander-in-Chief, Home Forces, with Auchinleck succeeding Brooke as GOC-in-C of Southern Command, responsible for the defence of Southern England, where the expected invasion would come from. The recently vacated V Corps was taken over by Lieutenant General Bernard Montgomery, who disliked Auchinleck intensely, possibly due to his disdain for the Indian Army and its officers. The relationship between the two future field marshals was not easy, with Montgomery later writing:

In the 5th Corps I first served under Auchinleck, who had the Southern Command; I cannot recall that we ever agreed on anything.

Many of Montgomery's actions in the next few weeks and months could be considered as insubordination, with one incident in particular standing out, when Montgomery went over Auchinleck's head directly to the Adjutant-General on issues related to officers and men being transferred to and from Montgomery's V Corps. Auchinleck was not to deal with this behaviour for long as in December he was ordered to succeed his friend, General Sir Robert Cassels, as Commander-in-Chief, India. By now known throughout the army as "the Auk", he was destined to encounter Montgomery again, although the circumstances there would not be at all pleasant.

=== India and Iraq January–May 1941 ===
Promoted to full general on 26 December, Auchinleck returned to India in January 1941 to assume his new appointment, in which position he was also appointed to the Executive Council of the Viceroy of India and appointed ADC General to the King, a ceremonial position he was to hold until after the end of the war. In April he succeeded Lieutenant General Sir Travers Clarke as colonel of the Royal Inniskilling Fusiliers.

In April 1941, RAF Habbaniya was threatened by the new pro-Axis regime of Rashid Ali. This large Royal Air Force station was west of Baghdad in Iraq and General Archibald Wavell, Commander-in-Chief Middle East Command, was reluctant to intervene, despite the urgings of Winston Churchill, because of his pressing commitments in the Western Desert and Greece. Auchinleck, however, acted decisively, sending the 1st Battalion of the King's Own Royal Regiment (Lancaster) by air to Habbaniya and shipping the 10th Indian Infantry Division by sea to Basra. Wavell was prevailed upon by London to send Habforce, a relief column, from the British Mandate of Palestine but by the time it arrived in Habbaniya on 18 May the Anglo-Iraqi War was virtually over.

=== North Africa July 1941 – August 1942 ===
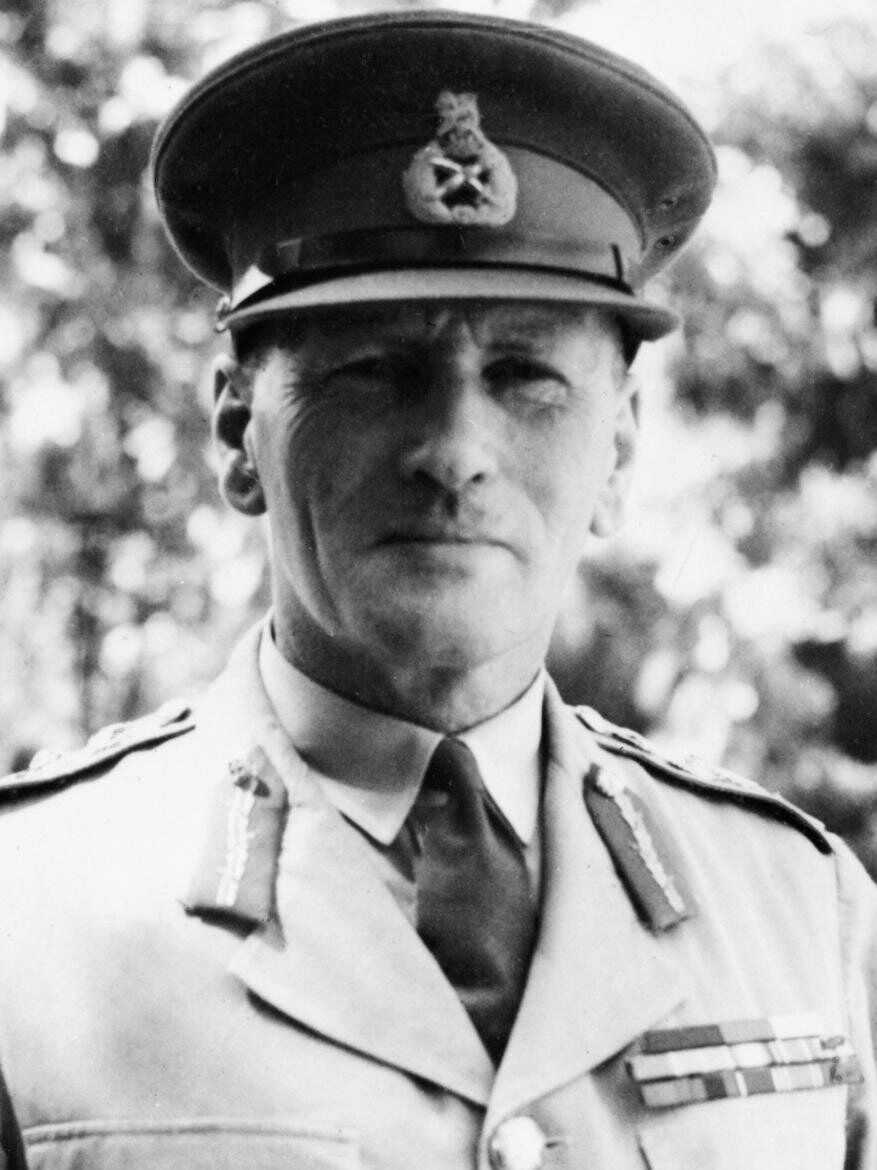
Sir Claude Auchinleck as Commander-in-Chief of the British forces in the Middle East.

Following the see-saw of Allied and Axis successes and reverses in North Africa, Auchinleck was appointed to succeed General Sir Archibald Wavell as Commander-in-Chief Middle East Command in July 1941; Wavell took up Auchinleck's post as Commander-in-Chief of the Indian Army, swapping jobs with him.

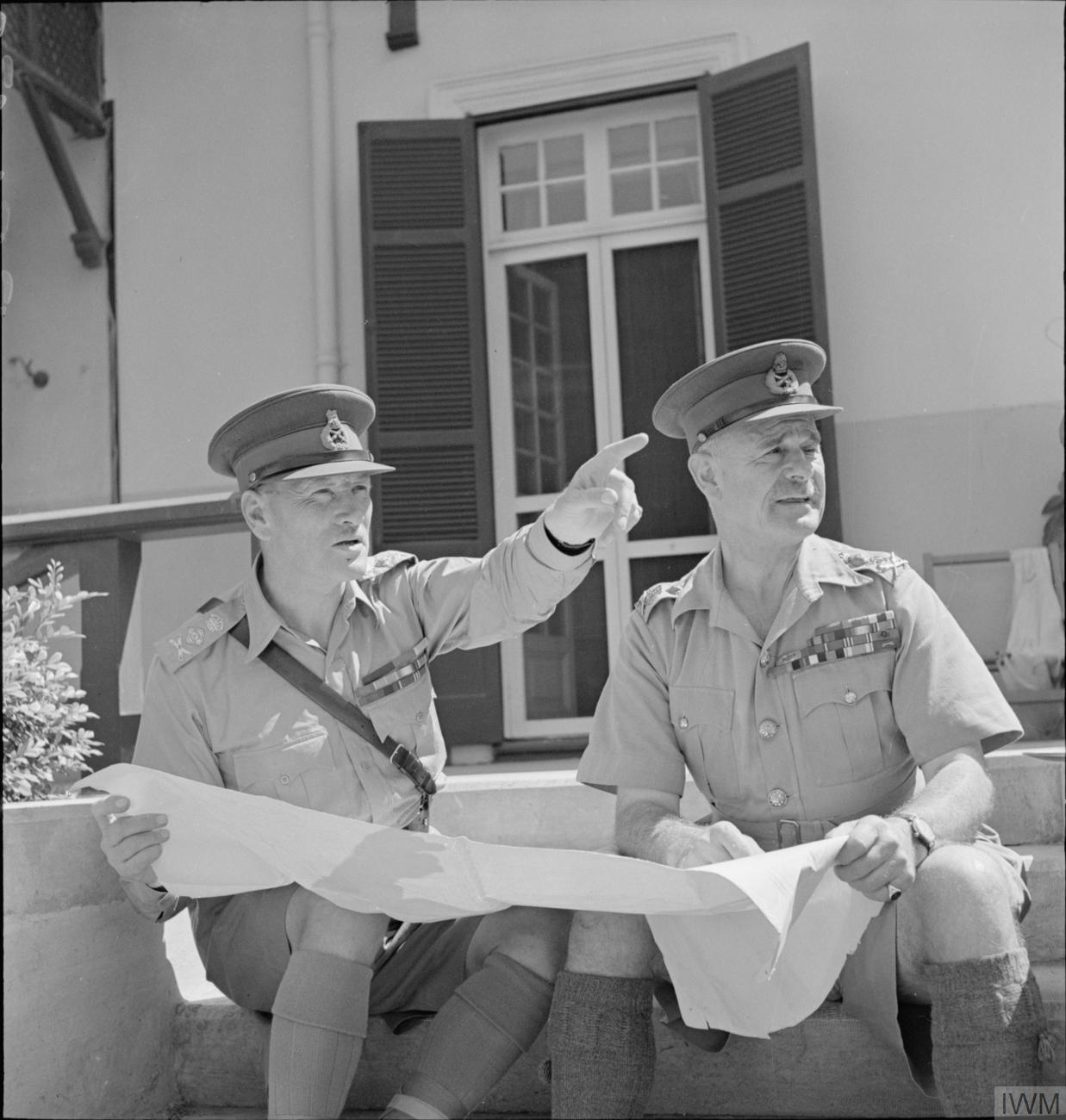
General Sir Archibald Wavell, Commander-in-Chief, India, and General Sir Claude Auchinleck, Commander-in-Chief Middle East, 8 September 1941.

As Commander-in-Chief Middle East, Auchinleck, based in Cairo, held responsibility not just for North Africa but also for Persia and the Middle East. He launched an offensive in the Western Desert, Operation Crusader, in November 1941: despite some tactical reverses during the fighting which resulted in Auchinleck replacing the Eighth Army commander Alan Cunningham with Neil Ritchie, by the end of December the besieged garrison of Tobruk had been relieved and Rommel obliged to withdraw to El Agheila. Auchinleck appears to have believed that the enemy had been defeated, writing on 12 January 1942 that the Axis forces were "beginning to feel the strain" and were "hard pressed".

In fact the Axis forces had managed to withdraw in good order and a few days after Auchinleck's optimistic appreciation, having reorganised and been reinforced, struck at the dispersed and weakened British forces, driving them back to the Gazala positions near Tobruk. The British Chief of the Imperial General Staff (CIGS), General Sir Alan Brooke, wrote in his diary that it was "nothing less than bad generalship on the part of Auchinleck. He has been overconfident and has believed everything his overoptimistic [DMI] Shearer has told him". Brooke commented that Auchinleck "could have been one of the finest of commanders" but lacked the ability to select the men to serve him. Brooke sent him one of his best armoured division commanders Richard McCreery, whose advice was ignored in favour of that of Auchinleck's controversial chief of operations, Major-General Dorman-Smith.

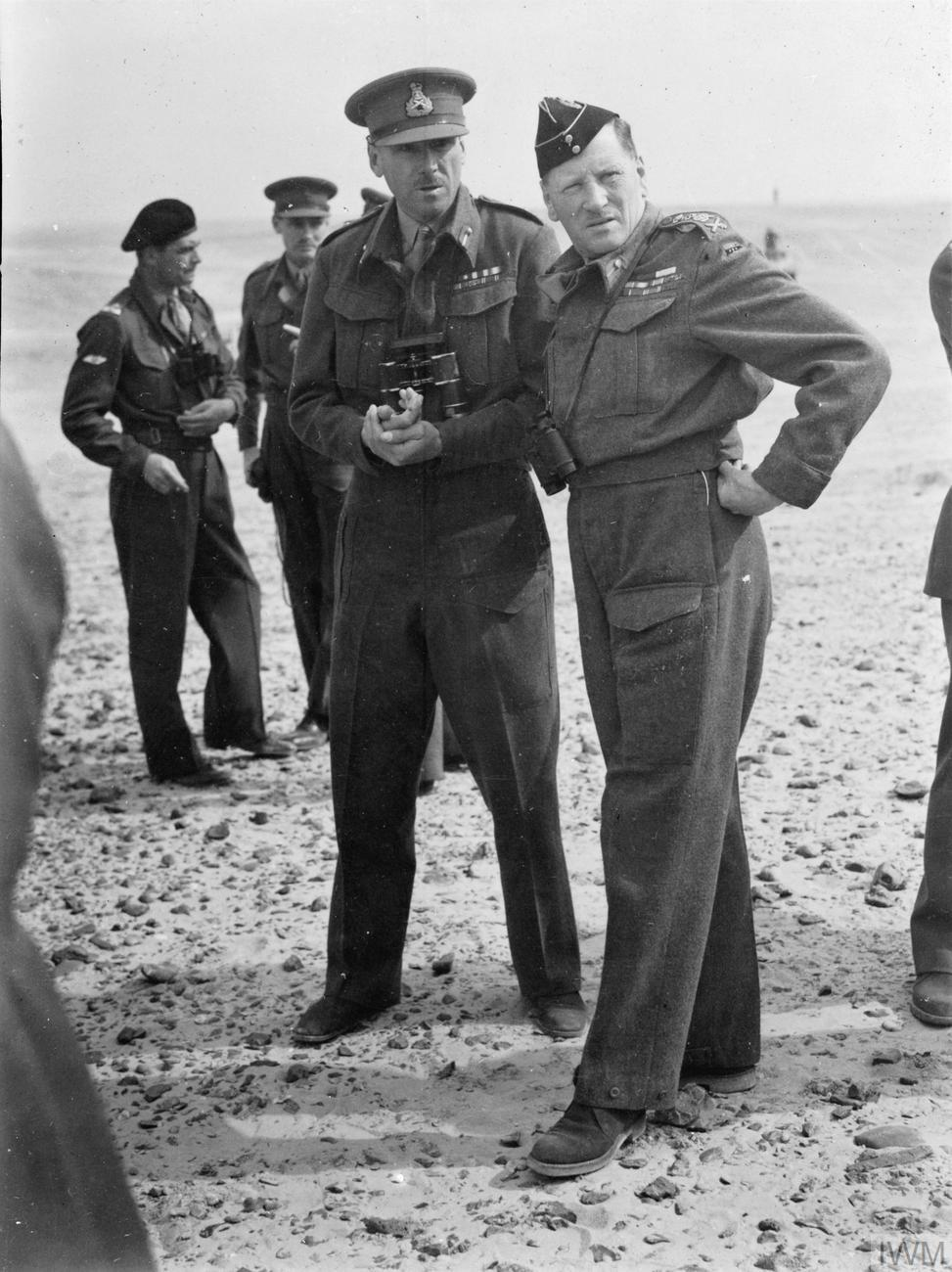
Major-General John "Jock" Campbell and General Sir Claude Auchinleck, Commander-in-Chief Middle East, in the Western Desert.

Rommel's attack at the Battle of Gazala of 26 May 1942 resulted in a significant defeat for the British. Auchinleck's appreciation of the situation written to Ritchie on 20 May had suggested that the armoured reserves be concentrated in a position suitable to meet both a flanking attack around the south of the front or a direct attack through the centre (which was the likelihood more favoured by Auchinleck). In the event, Ritchie chose a more dispersed and rearward positioning of his two armoured divisions and when the attack in the centre came, it proved to be a diversion and the main attack, by Rommel's armoured formations, came round the southern flank. Poor initial positioning and subsequent handling and coordination of Allied formations by Ritchie and his corps commanders resulted in their heavy defeat and the Eighth Army retreating into Egypt; Tobruk fell to the Axis on 21 June 1942.

On 24 June Auchinleck stepped in to take direct command of the Eighth Army, having lost confidence in Neil Ritchie's ability to control and direct his forces. Auchinleck discarded Ritchie's plan to stand at Mersa Matruh, deciding to fight only a delaying action there, while withdrawing to the more easily defendable position at El Alamein. Here Auchinleck tailored a defence that took advantage of the terrain and the fresh troops at his disposal, stopping the exhausted German/Italian advance in the First Battle of El Alamein. Enjoying a considerable superiority of material and men over the weak German/Italian forces, Auchinleck organised a series of counter-attacks. Poorly conceived and badly coordinated, these attacks achieved little.

"The Auk", as he was known, appointed a number of senior commanders who proved to be unsuitable for their positions, and command arrangements were often characterised by bitter personality clashes. Auchinleck was an Indian Army officer and was criticised for apparently having little direct experience or understanding of British and Dominion troops. Dorman-Smith was regarded with considerable distrust by many of the senior commanders in Eighth Army. By July 1942 Auchinleck had lost the confidence of Dominion commanders and relations with his British commanders had become strained. (Note: Alanbrooke in a footnote to his diary entry of 30 January wrote: "Auchinleck, to my mind, had most of the qualifications to make him one of the finest of commanders, but unfortunately he lacked the most important of all – the ability to select the men to serve him. The selection of Corbett as his Chief of Staff, Dorman-Smith as his chief advisor, and (Eric) Shearer as his head of intelligence service contributed most of all to his downfall")

Like his foe Rommel (and his predecessor Wavell and successor Montgomery), Auchinleck was subjected to constant political interference, having to weather a barrage of hectoring telegrams and instructions from Prime Minister Churchill throughout late 1941 and the spring and summer of 1942. Churchill constantly sought an offensive from Auchinleck, and was downcast at the military reverses in Egypt and Cyrenaica. Churchill was desperate for some sort of British victory before the planned Allied landings in North Africa, Operation Torch, scheduled for November 1942. He badgered Auchinleck immediately after the Eighth Army had all but exhausted itself after the first battle of El Alamein. Churchill and the Chief of the Imperial General Staff, Sir Alan Brooke, flew to Cairo in early August 1942 to meet Auchinleck, where it emerged he had lost the confidence of both men. He was replaced as Commander-in-Chief Middle East Command by General Sir Harold Alexander (later Field Marshal The Earl Alexander of Tunis).

Joseph M. Horodyski and Maurice Remy both praise Auchinleck as an underrated military leader who contributed the most to the successful defence of El Alamein and consequently the final defeat of Rommel in Africa. The two historians also criticize Churchill for the unreasonable decision to put the blame on Auchinleck and to relieve him.

=== India 1942–1945 ===
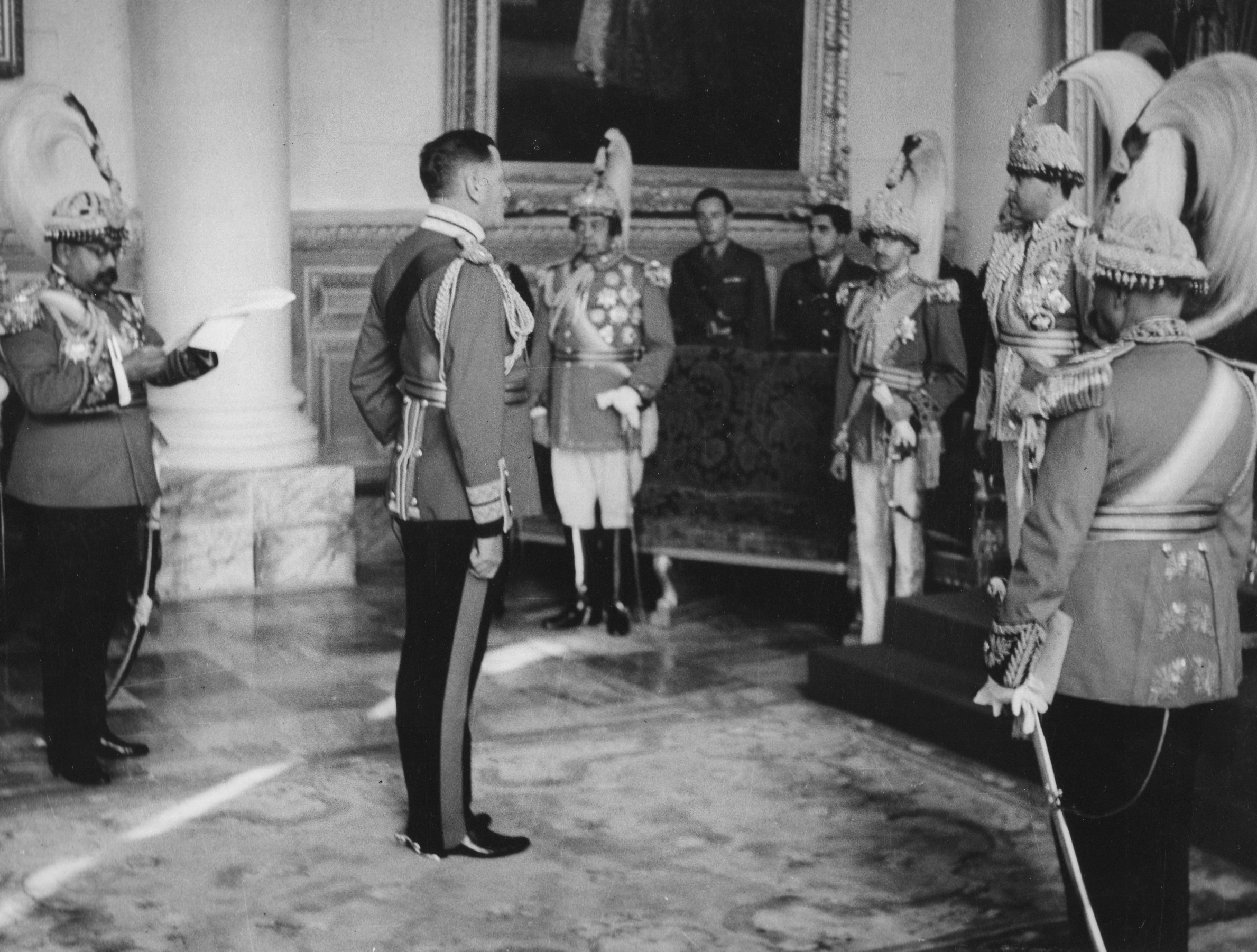
Auchinleck receiving the Star of Nepal in October 1945 from the King of Nepal, Tribhubana Bir Vikram Sah

Churchill offered Auchinleck command of the newly created Persia and Iraq Command (this having been separated from Alexander's command), but Auchinleck declined this post, as he believed that separating the area from the Middle East Command was not good policy and the new arrangements would not be workable. He set his reasons out in his letter to the Chief of the Imperial General Staff dated 14 August 1942. Instead he returned to India, where he spent almost a year "unemployed" before in June 1943 being again appointed Commander-in-Chief of the Indian Army.

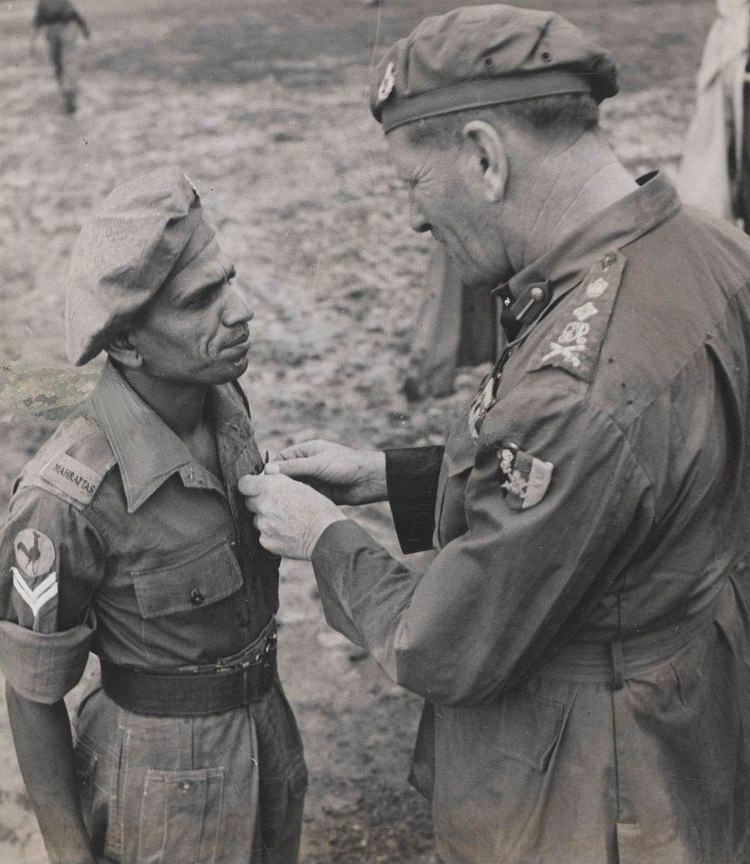
Naik Narayan Sinde, 5th Mahratta Light Infantry, receiving the Indian Distinguished Service Medal from Auchinleck, 1945.

General Wavell meanwhile having been appointed Viceroy, on this appointment it was announced that responsibility for the prosecution of the war with Japan would move from the Commander-in-Chief India to a newly created South East Asia Command. However, the appointment of the new command's Supreme Commander, Acting Vice Admiral Lord Louis Mountbatten, was not announced until August 1943 and until Mountbatten could set up his headquarters and assume control (in November), Auchinleck retained responsibility for operations in India and Burma while conducting a review and revision of Allied plans based on the decisions taken by the Allied Combined Chiefs of Staff at the Quadrant Conference, which ended in August.

Following Mountbatten's arrival, Auchinleck, as Commander-in-Chief India once more, was responsible for the internal security of India, the defence of the North West Frontier and the buildup of India as a base, including most importantly the reorganisation of the Indian Army, the training of forces destined for SEAC and the lines of communication carrying men and material to the forward areas and to China. Auchinleck made the supply of Fourteenth Army, with probably the worst lines of communication of the war, his immediate priority; as Sir William Slim, commander of the Fourteenth Army, was later to write:

It was a good day for us when he [Auchinleck] took command of India, our main base, recruiting area and training ground. The Fourteenth Army, from its birth to its final victory, owed much to his unselfish support and never-failing understanding. Without him and what he and the Army of India did for us we could not have existed, let alone conquered.

=== Divorce ===
Auchinleck suffered a personal disappointment when his wife Jessie left him for his friend, Air Chief Marshal Sir Richard Peirse. Peirse and Auchinleck had been students together at the Imperial Defence College, but that was long before. Peirse was now Allied Air Commander-in-Chief, South-East Asia, and also based in India. The affair became known to Mountbatten in early 1944, and he passed the information to the chief of the RAF, Sir Charles Portal, hoping that Peirse would be recalled. The affair was common knowledge by September 1944, and Peirse was neglecting his duties. Mountbatten sent Peirse and Lady Auchinleck back to England on 28 November 1944, where they lived together at a Brighton hotel. Peirse had his marriage dissolved, and Auchinleck obtained a divorce in 1946. Auchinleck was reportedly very badly affected. According to his sister, he was never the same after the break-up. He always carried a photograph of Jessie in his wallet even after the divorce.

There is scholarly dispute whether Auchinleck was homosexual. His biographer, Philip Warner, addressed the rumours but dismissed them. However, the historian Ronald Hyam has alleged that "sexually based moral-revulsion" was the reason for Montgomery's inability to get on with Auchinleck and that Auchinleck was "let off with a high-level warning" over his relationships with Indian boys.

== Partition of India and later years ==
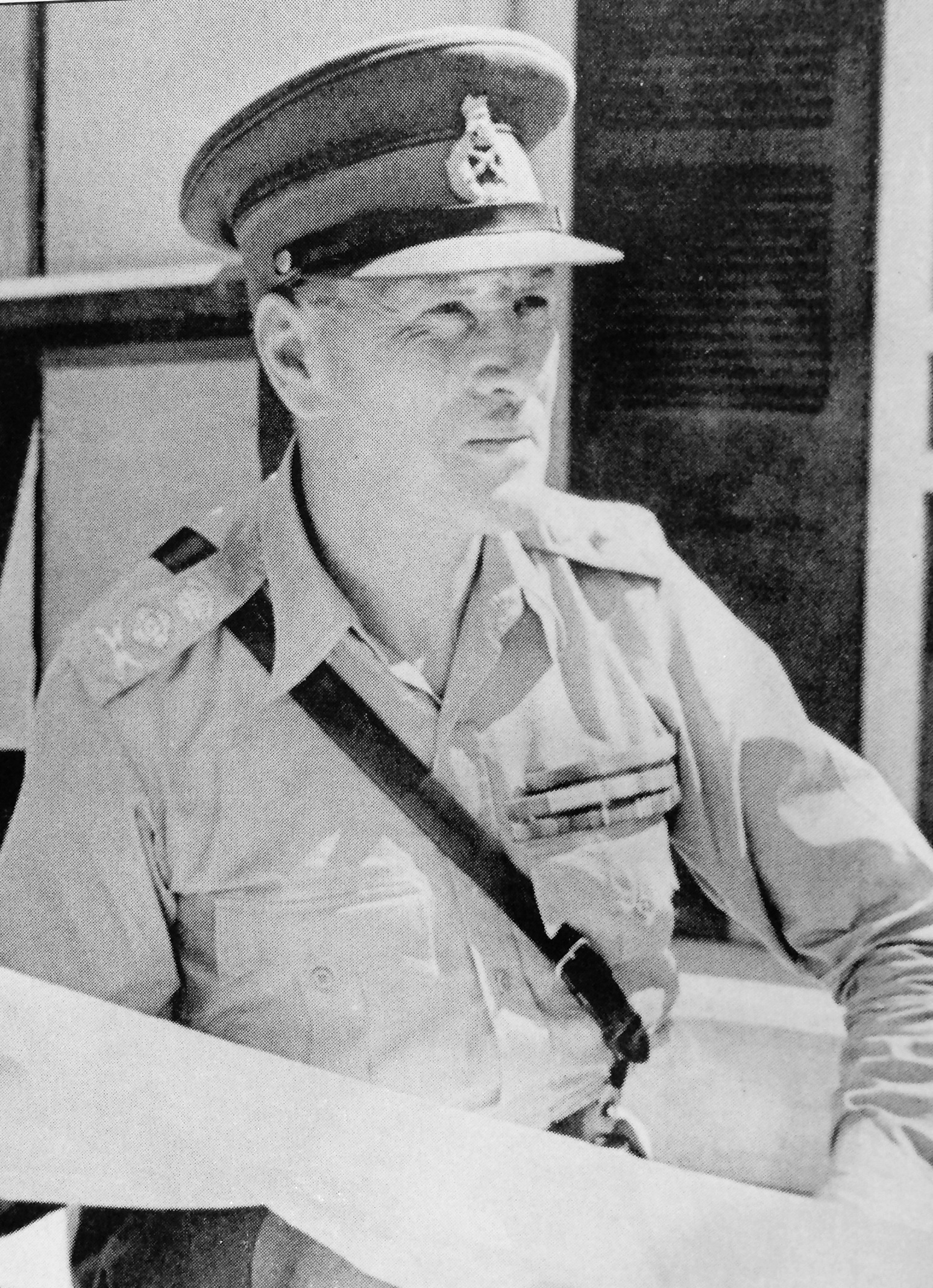
Sir Claude Auchinleck as the last Commander in Chief of British India

Auchinleck continued as Commander-in-Chief of the Indian Army after the end of the war helping, though much against his own convictions, to prepare the future Indian and Pakistani armies for the Partition of India: in November 1945 he was forced to commute the more serious judicial sentences awarded against officers of the Indian National Army in face of growing unease and unrest both within the Indian population, and the British Indian Army. On 1 June 1946 he was promoted to field marshal, but he refused to accept a peerage, lest he be thought associated with a policy (i.e. Partition) that he thought fundamentally dishonourable.

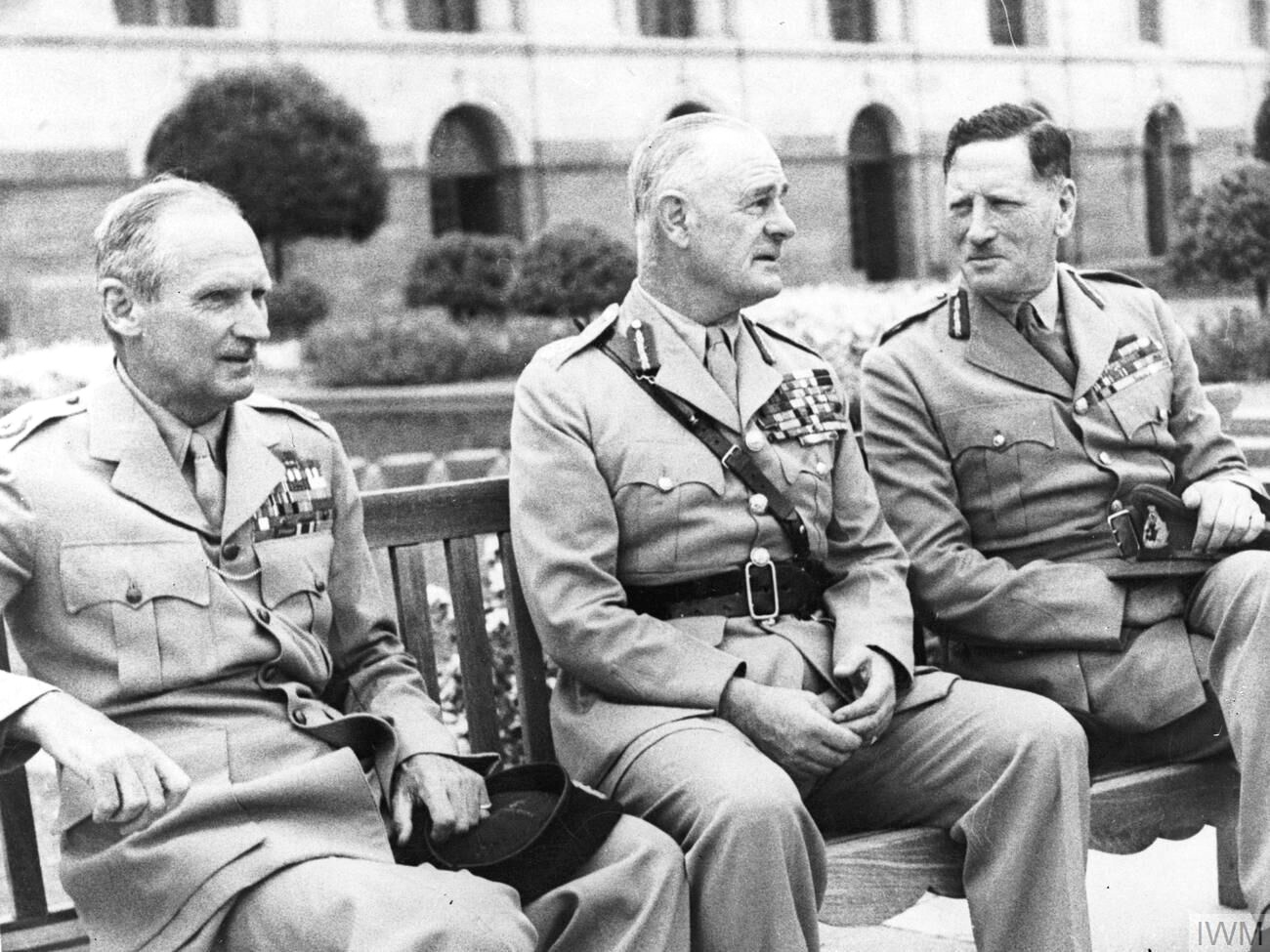
Auchinleck (right) as Commander-in-Chief of the Indian Army, with the then Viceroy Wavell (centre) and Montgomery (left)

Sending a report to the British Government on 28 September 1947, Field Marshal Auchinleck wrote: "I have no hesitation, whatever, in affirming that the present Indian Cabinet are implacably determined to do all in their power to prevent the establishment of the Dominion of Pakistan on firm basis." He stated in the second, political part of his assessment, "Since 15th August, the situation has steadily deteriorated and the Indian leaders, cabinet ministers, civil officials and others have persistently tried to obstruct the work of partition of the armed forces."

When partition was effected in August 1947, Auchinleck was appointed Supreme Commander of all British forces remaining in India and Pakistan and remained in this role until the winding up and closure of the Supreme H.Q. at the end of November 1947. This marked his effective retirement from the army (although technically field marshals in the British Army never retire, remaining on the active list on half pay). He left India on 1 December.

After a brief period in Italy in connection with an unsuccessful business project, Auchinleck retired to London, where he occupied himself with a number of charitable and business interests and became a respectably skilled watercolour painter. In 1960 he settled in Beccles in the county of Suffolk, remaining there for seven years until, at the age of eighty-four, he decided to emigrate and reside in Marrakesh, where he died on 23 March 1981.

== Memorials ==
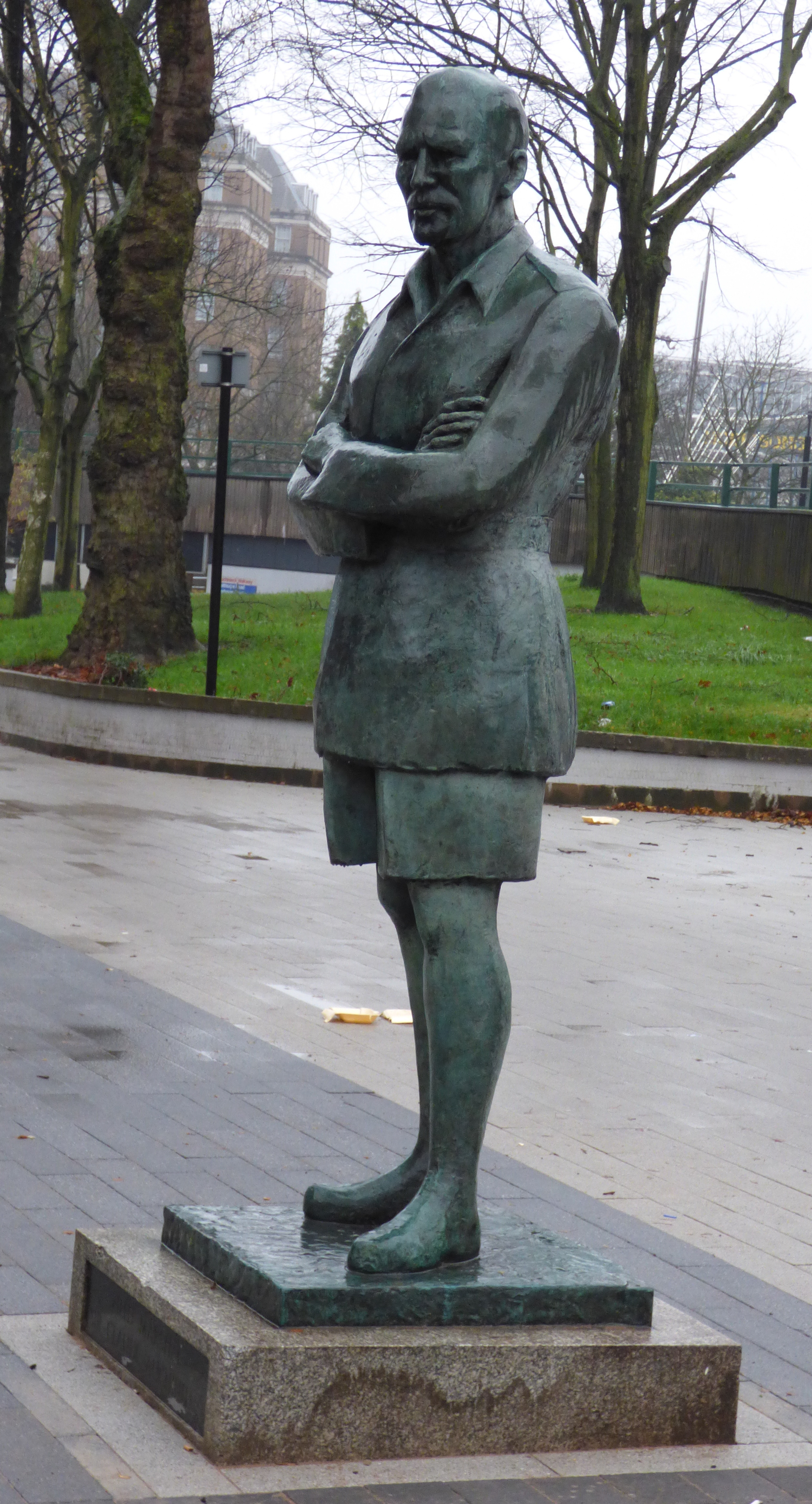
Statue of Auchinleck in Birmingham

Auchinleck is buried in Ben M'Sik European Cemetery, Casablanca, in the Commonwealth War Graves Commission plot in the cemetery, next to the grave of Raymond Steed who was the second youngest non-civilian Commonwealth casualty of the Second World War.

A memorial plaque was erected in the crypt of St Paul's Cathedral. A bronze statue of Auchinleck can be seen on Broad Street adjacent to Auchinleck House, Five Ways, Birmingham.

== Awards and decorations ==
- Knight Grand Cross of the Order of the Bath (CGB, 1 January 1945)
- Companion of the Order of the Bath (CB, 3 July 1934) Mohmand operations 7 October 1933
- Knight Grand Commander of the Order of the Indian Empire (GCIE, 20 December 1940)
- Companion of the Order of the Star of India (CSI, 8 May 1936) Mohmand operations 8 October 1935
- Companion of the Distinguished Service Order (DSO, 3 June 1917)
- Officer of the Order of the British Empire, Military Division (OBE, 3 June 1919)
- Mention in Despatches, twice (World War I and 3 July 1934 – Mohmand operations)
- Croix de Guerre with Palm (France, 1918 and 1949)
- Chief Commander of the Legion of Merit (United States, 23 July 1948)
- Member 5th class of the Order of Virtuti Militari (Poland, 15 May 1942)
- Member 1st Class of the Order of the Star of Nepal (Nepal, 1945)
- War Cross (Czechoslovakia, 1944)
- Grand Cross of Order of St Olav (Norway, 19 March 1948)

== Publications ==
- Auchinleck, Claude (8 March 1942). Operations in the Middle East 5th July 1941 to 31 October 1942. London: War Office..
  (Auchinleck's Official Middle East Despatch published after the war in "No. 37695". The London Gazette (Supplement). 20 August 1946. pp. 4215–4230.)
- Auchinleck, Claude (26 January 1943). Operations in the Middle East 1st November 1941 to 15 August 1942. London: War Office..
  (Auchinleck's Official Middle East Despatch published after the war in "No. 38177". The London Gazette (Supplement). 13 January 1948. pp. 309–400.)
- Auchinleck, Claude (22 November 1945). Operations in the Indo-Burma Theatre based on India from 21st June 1943 to 15 November 1943. London: War Office..
  (Auchinleck's Official Indo-Burma Despatch published after the war in "No. 38274". The London Gazette (Supplement). 27 April 1948. pp. 2651–2684.)

== Sources ==
- Brooke, Alan (2001). Danchev, Alex; Todman, Daniel (eds.). War Diaries 1939–1945. Phoenix Press. ISBN 1-84212-526-5.
- Bajwa, Kuldip Singh (2003). Jammu and Kashmir War, 1947-1948: Political and Military Perspective. Har-Anand Publications, New Delhi. ISBN 978-8124109236.
- Barr, Niall (2005). Pendulum Of War: Three Battles at El Alamein. Pimlico. ISBN 978-0712668279.
- Bond, Brian; Tachikawa, Kyoichi, eds. (2004). British and Japanese Military Leadership in the Far Eastern War, 1941–1945. London & New York: Frank Cass. ISBN 9780714656595.
- Doherty, Richard (2004). Ireland's Generals in the Second World War. Four Courts Press. ISBN 9781851828654.
- Heathcote, Tony (1999). The British Field Marshals 1736–1997. Barnsley (UK): Pen & Sword. ISBN 0-85052-696-5.
- Mackenzie, Compton (1951). Eastern Epic. Chatto & Windus, London. ASIN B0011DPGZ4.
- McGilvray, Evan (2020). Field Marshal Claude Auchinleck. Pen and Sword Books. ISBN 978-1526716101.
- Mead, Richard (2007). Churchill's Lions: A biographical guide to the key British generals of World War II. Stroud (UK): Spellmount. ISBN 978-1-86227-431-0.
- Montgomery, Bernard (2005). The Memoirs of Field Marshal Montgomery. Leo Cooper Ltd. ISBN 978-1844153305.
- Nawaz, Shija (2009). Crossed Swords: Pakistan, its Army, and the Wars Within. Oxford University Press. ISBN 978-0195476972.
- Playfair, I.S.O.; with Flynn, Captain F.C. (R.N.); Molony, Brigadier C.J.C. & Gleave, Group Captain T.P. (2004) [1st. pub. HMSO:1960]. Butler, James (ed.). The Mediterranean and Middle East, Volume III: British Fortunes reach their Lowest Ebb (September 1941 to September 1942). History of the Second World War, United Kingdom Military Series. Uckfield, UK: Naval & Military Press. ISBN 1-84574-067-X.
- Remy, Maurice Philip [in German] (2002). Mythos Rommel (in German). Munich: List Verlag. ISBN 3-471-78572-8.
- Stewart, Adrian (2010). The Early Battle of Eighth Army: crusader to the Alamein Line 1941–1942. Stackpole Books. ISBN 978-0811735360.
- Slim, William (1972) [1956]. Defeat into Victory. London: Cassell. ISBN 0-304-29114-5.
- Smart, Nick (2005). Biographical Dictionary of British Generals of the Second World War. Barnesley: Pen & Sword. ISBN 1844150496.
- Warner, Philip (1982) [1981]. Auchinleck. The Lonely Soldier. London: Sphere Books. ISBN 0-7221-8905-2.
- Warner, Philip (1991). Keegan, John (ed.). Churchill's Generals. London: Cassell Military. ISBN 0-304-36712-5.
- Kirby, S. Woodburn (2004) [1st. pub. HMSO:1961]. Butler, James (ed.). The War Against Japan, Volume III: The Decisive Battles. History of the Second World War, United Kingdom Military Series. Uckfield, UK: Naval & Military Press. ISBN 1-84574-062-9.

Military offices
Preceded by Francis Venning	Commander, Peshawar Brigade; 1933–1936	Succeeded by Richard O'Connor
New command	GOC IV Corps; February–May 1940	Succeeded by Francis Nosworthy
New command	GOC V Corps; June–July 1940	Succeeded by Bernard Montgomery
Preceded by Sir Alan Brooke	GOC-in-C Southern Command; July–December 1940	Succeeded by Sir Harold Alexander
Preceded by Sir Robert Cassels	C-in-C India; 1941	Succeeded by Sir Archibald Wavell
Preceded by Sir Archibald Wavell	C-in-C Middle East; 1941–1942	Succeeded by The Hon. Sir Harold Alexander
Preceded by Neil Ritchie	GOC Eighth Army; June–August 1942	Succeeded by Bernard Montgomery
Preceded by Sir Archibald Wavell	Commander-in-Chief, India; 1943–1947	Post abolished
New title	Supreme Commander, India and Pakistan; August–November 1947	Post abolished merged with the offices of the Governor-General of India and the Governor-General of Pakistan
Honorary titles
Preceded by Sir Travers Edwards Clarke	Colonel of the Royal Inniskilling Fusiliers; 1941–1947	Succeeded by Eric Edward James Moore
