= SS Empire Morn =

World War II merchant ship of the United Kingdom

History
- Name: Empire Morn (1941–1947); San Antonio (1947); Rio Pas (1947–1973)
- Owner: Ministry of War Transport (1941–1947); F. M. Pereda (1947–1962); Maritima Colonial y de Comercio SA, Spain (1962–1973)
- Builder: Vickers-Armstrongs, Barrow-in-Furness
- Yard number: 769
- Launched: 1 July 1941
- Completed: September 1941
- Reclassified: Damaged on 26 April 1943 and hulked; Repaired in 1947
- Fate: Scrapped in 1973

General characteristics
- Type: CAM ship
- Tonnage: 7,092 GRT
- Length: 433 ft (131.98 m)
- Beam: 56 ft 3 in (17.15 m)
- Draught: 34 ft 4 in (10.46 m)
- Propulsion: 1 x triple expansion steam engine
- Speed: 10 knots (19 km/h)

SS Empire Morn was a 7,092-ton CAM ship that was built in 1941. She saw service on a number of trade routes during the Second World War, making several crossings of the North Atlantic as well as voyages to Russia and Africa. She was badly damaged after hitting a mine in 1943, and spent the rest of the war laid up as a hulk. She was subsequently sold and repaired, returning to service for several companies after the war, under the names San Antonio and Rio Pas before being sold for scrapping in 1973.

Empire Morn is known for the death of the second youngest person in the British services to die in the war, 14-year-old galley boy Raymond Steed. She is also the only CAM ship whose fighter pilot died in action after his aircraft was launched from the ship.

== Wartime career ==
Empire Morn was built by Vickers-Armstrongs, Barrow-in-Furness as yard number 769. She was launched on 1 July 1941 and completed in September 1941. Empire Morn was built for the Ministry of War Transport and managed by E.J. Sutton & Co.

She served in a number of convoys during the war, occasionally sailing between British ports, such as Methil and Southend, Milford Haven and Liverpool, as well as the Arctic convoy assembly point at Loch Ewe. She sailed several times to North America, as part of convoys ON 17, ON 109 and ON 165, and back again as part of convoys SC 49, SC 50, SC 54 and SC 122. In January 1942 she sailed to Gibraltar as part of convoy OG 78, returning to Liverpool in February with convoy HG 79. Empire Morn was then assigned to the Arctic convoys, delivering supplies to the Soviet Union. She sailed in April 1942 as part of convoy PQ 15 to Murmansk, making the return journey in late April to May with convoy QP 12.

While she was sailing with QP 12 on 26 April her aircraft catapult she launched her single Hawker Hurricane, piloted by Flying Officer John Kendal. Kendal chased away a Blohm & Voss BV 138 and shot down a Junkers Ju 88. According to the Fighter Direction Officer:

Some seconds later the Hurricane was seen to dive perpendicularly into the sea, followed immediately by Kendal, his parachute opening some 50ft before he reached the water. SS Badsworth raced to the scene and picked him up at 1004. They signalled that Kendal was alive but very seriously injured and later that he had died from his injuries.

Empire Morn returned to Russia in September with convoy PQ 18. On 18 September Flying Officer Burr from Empire Morn destroyed two Heinkel He 111s and then flew to the Russian Keg Ostrov aerodrome. Empire Morn arrived safely at Arkhangelsk, and returned to Britain with convoy QP 15.

=== Damaged by mine ===
Empire Morn shifted to warmer waters the following year, and in April 1943 she joined convoy OS/KMS 46 bound for Gibraltar via Casablanca. She was carrying a cargo of equipment destined for naval, army and RAF forces. She arrived at Casablanca on 25 April 1943, and then set off for Gibraltar, and on 26 April 1943, at 34°08′N 07°58′W, she struck a mine that had been laid by U-117 on 10 April. A secondary explosion damaged the stern and blew out much of the crew accommodation. When the order was given to abandon ship, a head count of crew found 21 men missing. Among them was the 14-year old galley boy Raymond Steed. Steed's body was found two days later, and he became the second youngest person in the British services to die in the war. He was 14 years and 207 days old. It was thought that he was the youngest wartime service casualty until February 2010, when it was confirmed Reginald Earnshaw was actually younger, at 14 years and 152 days. The damaged Empire Morn was towed back into Casablanca, where she was expected to be declared a total constructive loss. She was however refloated and towed to Gibraltar, eventually arriving on 1 September 1943.

== Hulked and postwar ==
The Empire Morn was not repaired, and was used as a store hulk at Gibraltar. She remained in this role until 1947, when she was sold to F M Pereda, of Spain, as the San Antonio. She underwent repairs that involved the fitting of a new stern in Cádiz, that increased her length and tonnage. She sailed with F M Pereda, having been renamed Rio Pas later in 1947, until 1963. She was then sold to Marítima Colonial y de Comercio SA (MARCOSA), of Madrid and remained in service with them until being scrapped at Santander in January 1973.
