= Clive Franklyn Collett =

World War I flying ace from New Zealand

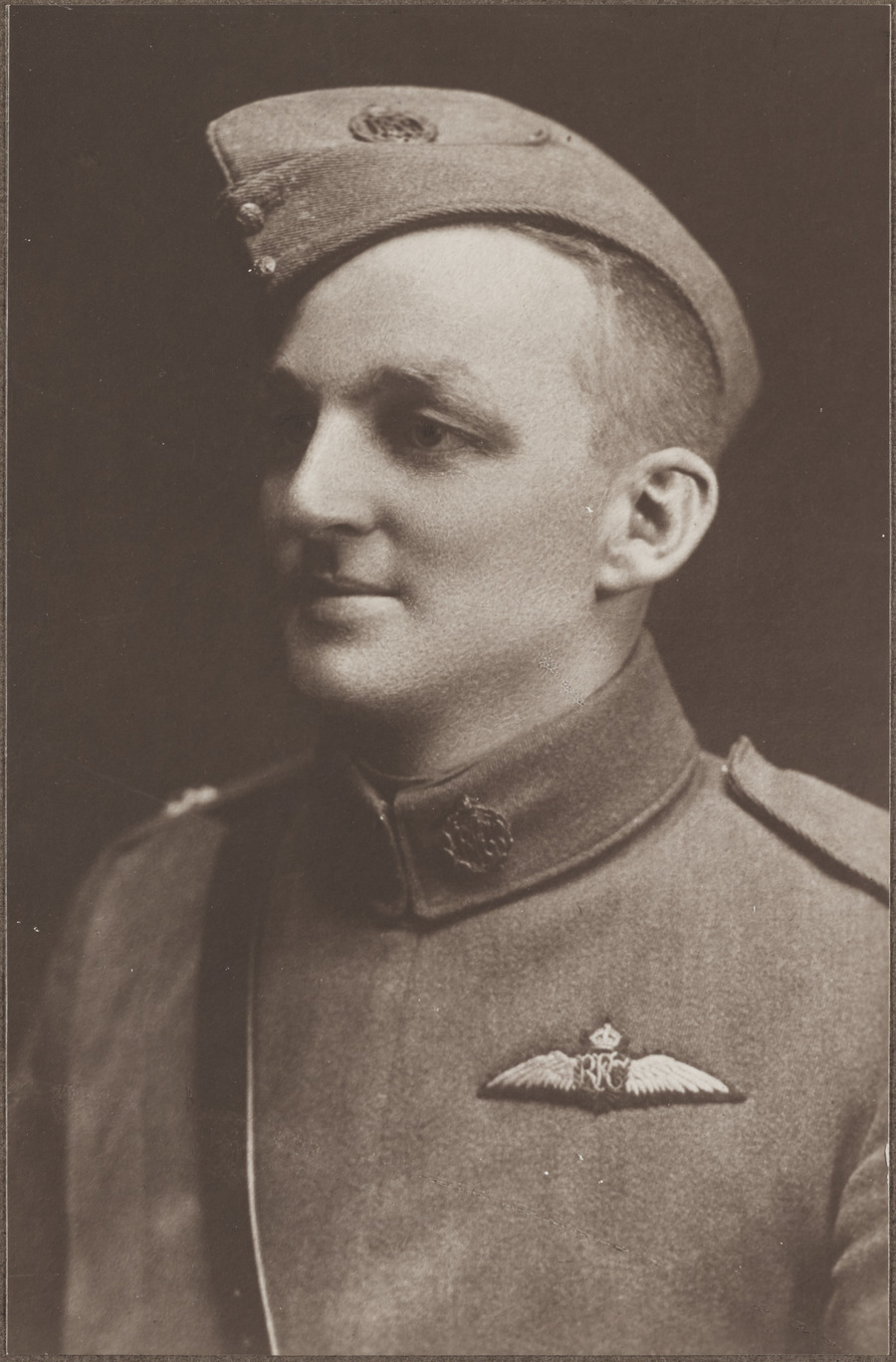
- Born: 28 August 1886; Blenheim, New Zealand
- Died: 23 December 1917 (aged 31); Firth of Forth, Scotland
- Burial place: Grave no. K903, Comely Bank Cemetery, Edinburgh, Scotland
- Military career
- Allegiance: New Zealand
- Branch: Royal Flying Corps
- Service years: 1914–1917
- Rank: Captain
- Units: No. 11 Squadron RFC, No. 8 Squadron RFC, No. 32 Squadron RFC, No. 18 Squadron RFC, No. 70 Squadron RFC, No. 73 Squadron RFC
- Awards: Military Cross with Bar

Captain Clive Franklyn Collett MC* (28 August 1886 – 23 December 1917) was a World War I flying ace from New Zealand credited with 11 aerial victories. He was the first British or Commonwealth military pilot to use a parachute, in a test. While serving as a test pilot, he crashed to his death in a captured German fighter.

== Early life ==
Collett was born in Blenheim, New Zealand, on 28 August 1886. His father, Horace Edwin Collett, lived at Lambeth, London, England. His mother, Alice Marguerite Radford, the senior Collett's wife, resided in Tauranga. After completing his education at Queen's College in Tauranga, Clive Collett chose a career in engineering.

== First World War ==
Collett was in Britain when the First World War broke out. He joined the Royal Flying Corps in 1914. He earned his Royal Aero Club Pilot's Certificate number 1057 at a private flying school on 29 January 1915. He was transferred to Brooklands on 17 February. Two months later, he was commissioned. On 25 May, he joined No. 11 Squadron RFC. On 6 July, he was hospitalized for an injury suffered in an aircraft mishap at Hendon. On 30 July, he was posted to No. 8 Squadron RFC at Netheravon, Wiltshire.

Collett pulled an on-base transfer to join No. 32 Squadron RFC on 1 March 1916; however, he was then posted to No. 18 Squadron RFC on 9 March 1916 as a Vickers FB.5 pilot. After a month's service, he was admitted to hospital on 18 April with a broken nose, and returned to Home Establishment in England via the merchant ship Delta.

On 13 June 1916, he was posted to the Royal Flying Corps' Experimental Station at Orfordness, Suffolk as a test pilot. His duties there included undertaking the British military's first parachute jump from an aeroplane, a Royal Aircraft Factory BE.2c, from a height of 180 metres (590 ft) on 13 January 1917 using a parachute designed by Everard Calthrop. He successfully repeated the experiment several days later.

On 24 July 1917, he joined No. 70 Squadron RFC, which had just upgraded to Sopwith Camels. As a Captain, he was a Flight Commander. Three days later, he destroyed a German Albatros D.V over Ypres for his first victory. He would win six more victories in August. Collett was accounted an aggressive pilot by fellow ace James McCudden, who noted that Collett "...used to come back shot to ribbons nearly every time he went out." Collett himself noted in his combat reports an incident when he continued to fire on a crashed German plane.

On 5 September 1917, Collett destroyed another Albatros D.V over Roulers. Four days later, he scored a victory in each of three separate dogfights spread over three-quarters of an hour. He was also wounded in the hand, most probably by Ludwig Hanstein of Jasta 35. Collett was removed from combat.

While recuperating, he was awarded the Military Cross on 26 September 1917. A Bar followed shortly thereafter, on 18 October 1917.

When recovered, Collett was assigned to No. 73 Squadron RFC as they prepared their Camels for combat. On 23 December 1917, Collett was test-flying a captured German Albatros over the Firth of Forth, which inexplicably dived into the sea. He was buried in grave K903 in Comely Bank Cemetery in Edinburgh.

== Honors and awards ==
Text of citation for the Military Cross:

For conspicuous gallantry and devotion to duty as a leader of offensive patrols during a period of three weeks. He has on numerous occasions attacked large formations of enemy aircraft single-handed, destroyed some, and driven others down out of control. He has led his formation with great skill, and has on several occasions extricated them from most difficult positions, and in every engagement his gallantry and dash have been most marked.

Text of citation for Bar to the Military Cross:

For conspicuous gallantry and devotion to duty in leading offensive patrols against enemy aircraft. Within a period of three weeks he successfully engaged and destroyed five enemy machines (three of them in one day), attacking them from low altitudes with the greatest dash and determination. His brilliant example was a continual source of inspiration to the squadron in which he served.
