= Ben M'Sik European Cemetery =

Cemetery in Casablanca, Morocco

Coordinates: 33°34′17″N 7°34′23″W

The Ben M'Sik European Cemetery is a cemetery in Casablanca, Morocco and is described as "a very large civilian cemetery...approximately 6 kilometres from Casablanca town centre".

Ben M'Sik European Cemetery contains 38 Commonwealth burials of the Second World War. The Commonwealth plot also contains two war graves of other nationalities and seven non-war burials. Among the latter is the grave of Field Marshal Sir Claude Auchinleck, who held a number of commands during the Second World War. He died in 1981 at the age of 96, and is buried alongside Galley Boy Raymond Steed, who at 14 years of age was the second youngest known Commonwealth casualty of the Second World War.
