= J. R. Murray =

Scottish accountant and Ceylonese politician (1898–1991)

John Rose Murray (19 December 1898 – 2 May 1991) was a Scottish chartered accountant and politician who served as an appointed member of the House of Representatives of Ceylon from 1952 to 1958.

Murray was born on 19 December 1898 in Edinburgh, Midlothian, the youngest of six children of John Rose Murray, an engine fitter, and Helena (née McLeod).

In September 1929, Murray married Hilda Beatrice Cooper (1911–2015), whom he had met in Ceylon. They had four children: John Telfer McLeod Murray (born 1929), a daughter and two other sons.

A chartered accountant and member of the Institute of Chartered Accountants of Scotland, Murray was working in Ceylon by at least 1942. In that year he was listed by the Government of Ceylon as a registered auditor, with his business address given as care of Bosanquet & Skrine Ltd., Chatham Street, Fort, Colombo. He continued to appear in official lists of registered auditors in subsequent years.

Murray served as chairman of the Ceylon Chamber of Commerce on several occasions between 1950 and 1955.

He was appointed to the House of Representatives of Ceylon by the Governor-General, with effect from 5 June 1952. He served until his resignation in March 1958.

Murray died on 2 May 1991 in Taunton Deane, Somerset, aged 92, and was buried in Comely Bank Cemetery, Edinburgh.
