= Raymond Steed =

British Merchant Navy sailor (1928–1943)

Raymond Victor Steed
- Steed, circa. 1937–1939.
- Born: 1 October 1928; St Mellons, Monmouthshire, Wales
- Died: 26 April 1943 (aged 14); SS Empire Morn, Atlantic Ocean, off Casablanca, French Morocco
- Burial place: Ben M'Sik European Cemetery, Casablanca
- Military career
- Allegiance: United Kingdom
- Branch: British Merchant Navy
- Rank: Galley Boy
- Conflicts: World War II: Operation Torch
- Awards: Africa Star, 1939 War Medal, Atlantic Star, 1939-1945 Star
- Other work: Killed in action

Raymond Victor Steed (1 October 1928 – 26 April 1943) was the second youngest British services recruit to die during the Second World War. He was just 14 years and 207 days old when the ship on which he was a galley boy, SS Empire Morn, was blown up after it hit a U-boat mine on 26 April 1943. He was previously described by the Commonwealth War Graves Commission as "the youngest known British services death," but this was revised in February 2010, when it was confirmed Reginald Earnshaw was actually younger, at 14 years and 151 days.

== Early life ==
Raymond Steed, the son of steelworker Wilfred and his wife Olive (née Bright), was born on 1 October 1928, at Rimperley Terrace, St Mellons, Monmouthshire, Wales. He was one of nine children. The family later moved to Christchurch Road, Newport, near Cardiff.

Steed signed up to the British Merchant Navy Reserve Pool on 29 December 1942, two months after his 14th birthday. He joined his first ship, the former Royal Mail Line SS Atlantis, on the same day. Steed served as a steward's boy on the Atlantis, which had been converted into a hospital ship. He was awarded the Africa Star with clasp during Operation Torch, when Allied troops landed on the beaches of North Africa. Steed left the ship three months later, in March 1943, to join the SS Empire Morn.

== Death ==
Steed's service aboard Empire Morn, a 7,092 GRT catapult aircraft merchant ship built by Barrow-in-Furness-based Vickers-Armstrong Ltd in 1941, started on 4 April 1943. The ship sailed from Milford Haven on that day, loaded with military equipment destined for Casablanca and Gibraltar. She arrived at Casablanca on 25 April, and then set off for Gibraltar. At 9:45 p.m. on 26 April 1943, the ship hit a U-boat mine off Rabat, Morocco at 34°08′N 07°58′W. A secondary explosion damaged the stern and blew out much of the crew accommodation. German records later revealed the Morn had detonated a mine laid on 10 April 1943, by U-boat 117. When the order was given to abandon ship, a head count of crew found 21 men missing. Steed was among this number.

Towed back into Casablanca, the damaged ship was expected to be declared a "total constructive loss"; however, it was refloated and towed to Gibraltar, by the tugs Lorient and Schelde, eventually arriving on 1 September 1943. Steed's body was not discovered until two days after the sinking, on 28 April 1943. The remains of another crewman, 18-year-old Ordinary Seaman John Gardener, were found at the same time. Both had been killed instantly in the explosions. The bodies of the remaining 19 missing sailors were never found. Steed was posthumously awarded the 1939 War Medal, the Atlantic Star and the 1939-1945 Star.

Steed and Gardener were buried at Ben M'Sik European Cemetery in Casablanca, Morocco, on 29 April with full military honours. The captain of the Empire Morn attended the ceremony, as did his officers and members of the crew. The Empire Morn survived the war, serving as a storage hulk in Gibraltar. It was sold in 1947 to F M Pereda, of Spain, and renamed San Antonio. The ship was towed to Cádiz, arriving on 12 March 1947 and again renamed, this time as Rio Pas. A new stern section was added during repairs. Morn was sold on again in 1962, to Maritima Colonial y de Comercio SA, of Spain. It was finally scrapped in 1973 in Santander, Spain.

== Memorial appeal ==
A fund-raising appeal was launched to pay for a memorial statue for Steed in his home city of Newport in 2007. The appeal has been supported by the Merchant Navy Association, the city council and Uskmouth Power Community Chest.
