= William Miller Frazer =

Scottish painter

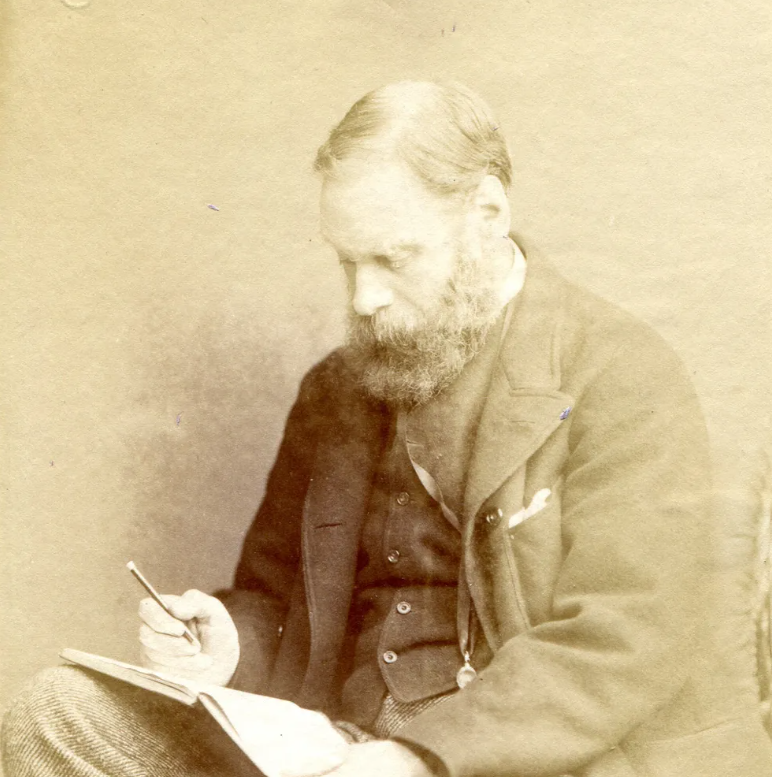
- Born: 30 September 1864; Scone, Perthshire, Scotland
- Died: 7 May 1961 (aged 96); Edinburgh, Scotland
- Known for: Landscape painting

William Miller Frazer (30 September 1864 – 7 May 1961) was a Scottish painter. He is known for his Landscape paintings.

== Biography ==
Frazer was born in Scone, Perthshire in 1864 to Bailie John Frazer. He was educated at Sharp’s Institute and Perth Academy before moving to Edinburgh in 1883 where he would study at the Board of Manufactures School. Three years later he entered the Royal Scottish Academy Life School, where he would begin his artistic training.

From 1890 Frazer would travel across Europe including studying for a time in Paris; he would make sketches throughout his travels. Upon returning to Britain, he would focus on landscape paintings depicting scenes of Northern England and Scotland.

Frazer would primarily exhibit at the Royal Glasgow Institute of Fine Arts. He would also exhibit in London and at RSA exhibitions in Edinburgh, to which he would be elected a member in 1924. He would also serve for a time as president of the Scottish Arts Club.
