= John Wilson Ewbank =

English painter

John W. Ewbank (4 May 1799 – 28 November 1847), was an English-born landscape and marine painter largely operational from Scotland.

== Life ==
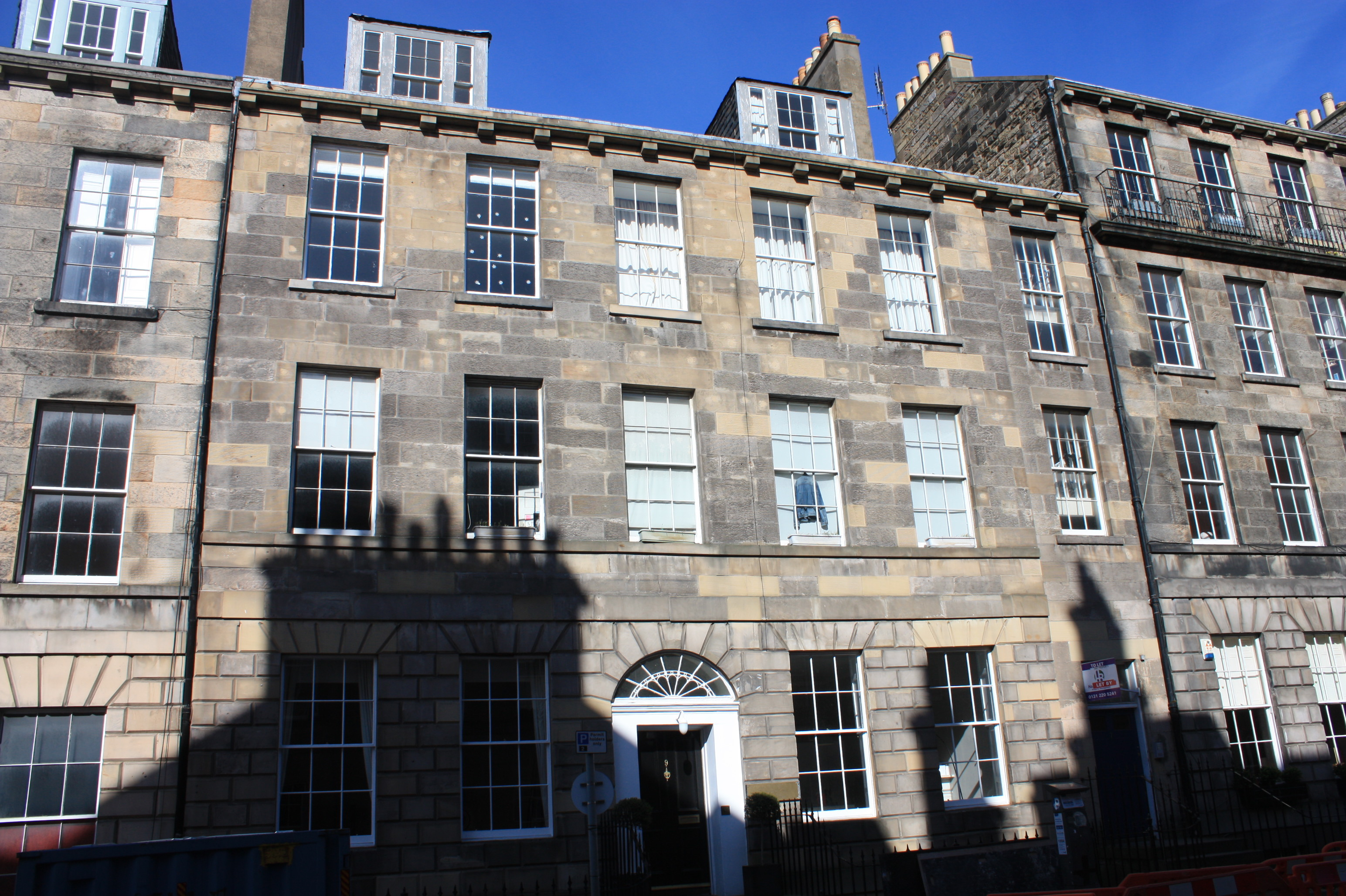
The property at 7 Union Street, Edinburgh where the artist John Ewbank lived

Ewbank was born at Darlington on 4 May 1799, the son of Michael Ewbank, an innkeeper. He was adopted as a child by a wealthy uncle who lived at Wycliffe, on the banks of the River Tees, in the North Riding of Yorkshire. Intended for the Roman Catholic priesthood, he was sent to Ushaw College, from which he absconded.

In 1813 Ewbank was apprenticed to Thomas Coulson, an ornamental painter in Newcastle. In around 1816 he moved with Coulson to Edinburgh, where he had some lessons with Alexander Nasmyth. He found work both as a painter and a teacher. He was nominated in 1830 one of the foundation members of the Royal Scottish Academy. Having become a success with history painting, he took to drink, and fell into poverty.

In 1833 he is listed as living at 7 Union Street on the eastern fringe of the New Town in Edinburgh.

He died of typhus fever in the infirmary at Sunderland, 28 November 1847.

== Works ==
His sketches from nature were especially admired by contemporaries, and a series of 51 drawings of Edinburgh by him were engraved by W. H. Lizars for James Browne's Picturesque Views of Edinburgh (1825). He also made a reputation with cabinet pictures of banks of rivers, coast scenes, and marine subjects.

As an illustrator he illustrated some early editions of Scott's Waverley Novels and one edition of Gilbert White's Natural History of Selborne.

After 1829 he changed style and painted The Visit of George IV to Edinburgh, The Entry of Alexander the Great into Babylon, and Hannibal crossing the Alps. A View of Edinburgh from Inchkeith belongs to this period.

Later works were painted for cash.

His works are held in several museums worldwide, including the British Museum, the Glasgow School of Art Archives and Collections, the Victoria and Albert Museum, the Edinburgh Libraries and Museums and Galleries, the University of Michigan Museum of Art, and the University of Strathclyde Archives and Special Collections.
