= Reginald Earnshaw =

British merchant seaman

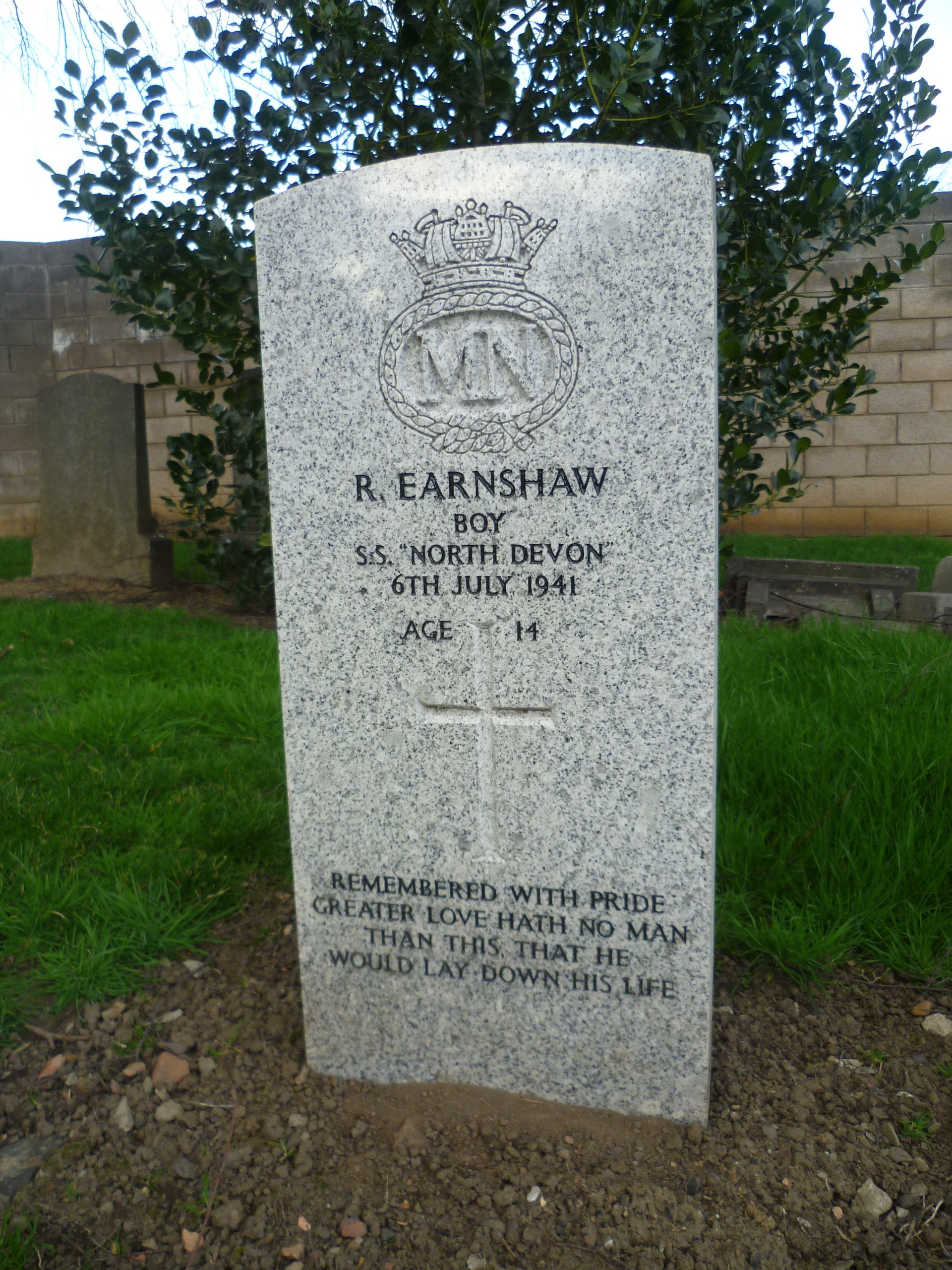
- Born: 5 February 1927; Dewsbury, West Yorkshire, England
- Died: 6 July 1941 (aged 14) off Norfolk, England
- Burial place: Comely Bank Cemetery, Edinburgh, Scotland
- Military career
- Allegiance: United Kingdom
- Branch: British Merchant Navy
- Rank: Galley Boy
- Conflicts: World War II
- Awards: 1939 War Medal

Reginald Hamilton Earnshaw (5 February 1927 – 6 July 1941), known as Reggie Earnshaw, is believed to have been the youngest person in the British services to die in World War II. He was just 14 years, 151 days old when he died under enemy fire off the coast of Norfolk on 6 July 1941.

Earnshaw was born in Dewsbury, West Yorkshire, to Dorothy Earnshaw. She then married Eric Shires, and the couple had two daughters. Aged 12, he moved with the family to the Granton area of Edinburgh, attending Bellevue School. He left aged 14, and joined the Merchant Navy in February 1941, giving his birth year as 1926 rather than 1927 in order to appear 15, which was the minimum age for recruitment. Earnshaw's body was recovered after the attack and his death certificate, based partly on the false information he had supplied on recruitment, gave his age only as "about 15 years". Buried originally in an unmarked grave (section P, grave 440) at Comely Bank Cemetery, Edinburgh, his story and his true age came to light after shipmate Alfred Tubb started a search for his burial place. In 2009, the grave was marked by the Commonwealth War Graves Commission with a granite headstone.
