= Wolfpack Breslau =

Wolf pack Breslau
- Active: 2 October 1941 - 29 October 1941
- Country: Nazi Germany
- Branch: Kriegsmarine
- Size: 6 submarines

Commanders
- Notable commanders: Klaus Bargsten; Hans-Werner Kraus; Reinhard Suhren

Breslau was the name given to a wolfpack of German U-boats that operated during the World War II Battle of the Atlantic in 1943 from 2 October 1941 to 29 October 1941.

== Breslau ==
The group was responsible for sinking 7 merchant ships (21,578 gross register tons (GRT)), 2 warships (2,795 tons) and 1 warship damaged (6,746 tons).

=== Raiding History ===
Date	U-boat	Commander	Name of ship	Nationality	Tons	Convoy	Fate
12 October 1941	U-83	Hans-Werner Kraus	Corte Real	Portugal	2,044		Sunk
14 October 1941	U-204	Walter Kell	Aingeru Guardakoa	Spain	97		Sunk
14 October 1941	U-206	Herbert Opitz	HMS Fleur de Lys	Royal Navy	925	OG-75	Sunk
19 October 1941	U-206	Herbert Opitz	Baron Kelvin	United Kingdom	3,081		Sunk
19 October 1941	U-204	Walter Kell	Inverlee	United Kingdom	9,158		Sunk
24 October 1941	U-564	Reinhard Suhren	Alhama	United Kingdom	1,352	HG-75	Sunk
24 October 1941	U-564	Reinhard Suhren	Ariosto	United Kingdom	2,176	HG-75	Sunk
24 October 1941	U-564	Reinhard Suhren	Carsbreck	United Kingdom	3,670	HG-75	Sunk
24 October 1941	U-563	Klaus Bargsten	HMS Cossack	Royal Navy	1,870	HG-75	Sunk
26 October 1941	U-83	Hans-Werner Kraus	HMS Ariguani	Royal Navy	6,746	HG-75	Damaged

=== U-boats ===
U-boat	Commander	From	To
U-71	Walter Flachsenberg	2 October 1941	29 October 1941
U-83	Hans-Werner Kraus	2 October 1941	29 October 1941
U-204	Walter Kell	5 October 1941	19 October 1941
U-206	Herbert Opitz	2 October 1941	23 October 1941
U-563	Klaus Bargsten	4 October 1941	29 October 1941
U-564	Reinhard Suhren	2 October 1941	29 October 1941
