= List of shipwrecks of Africa =

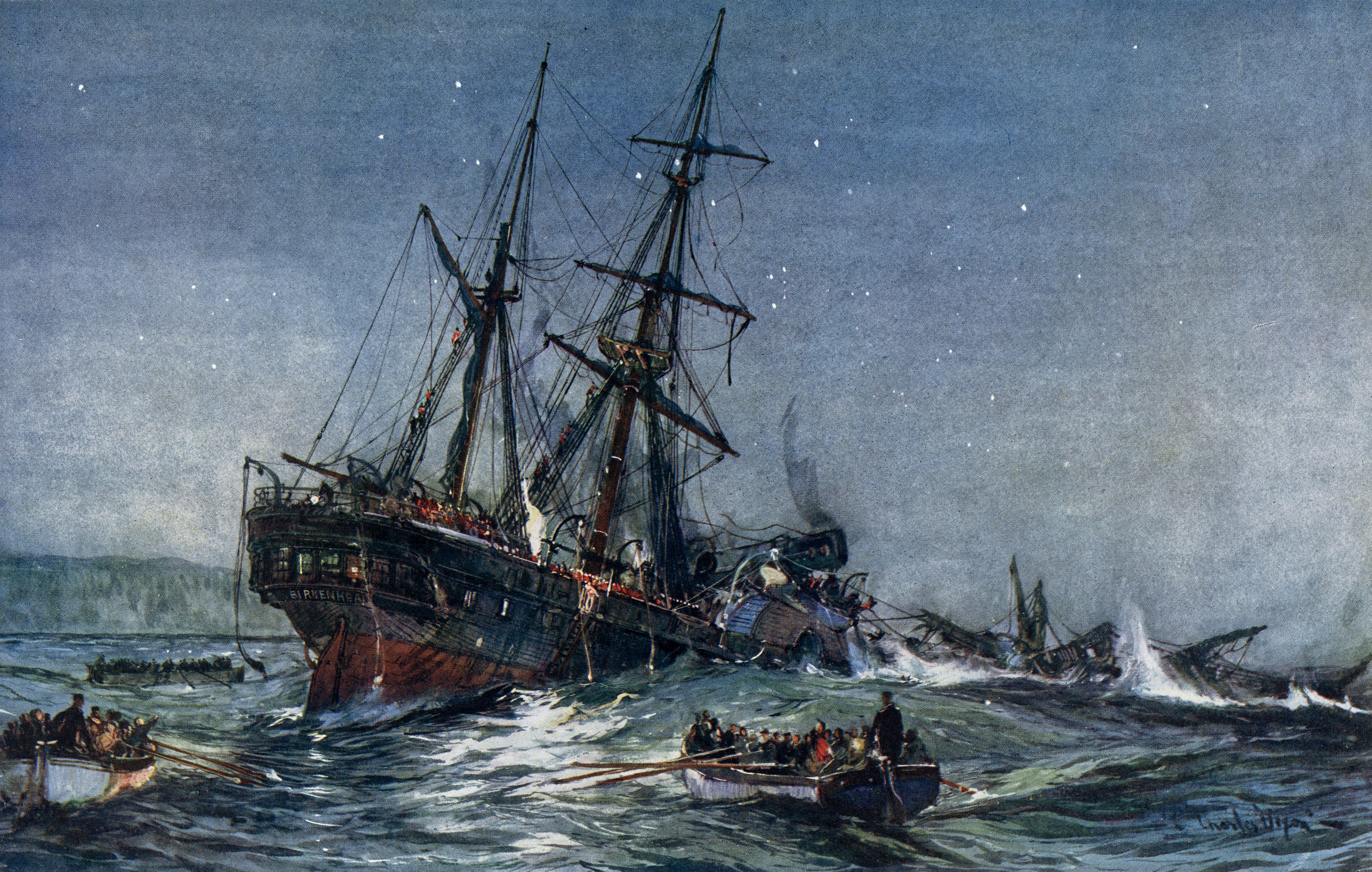
The Wreck of the Birkenhead (1901) by Charles Dixon

This is a list of shipwrecks located in or around the continent of Africa.

== East Africa ==
=== Eritrea ===
Ship	Flag	Sunk date	Notes	Coordinates
Black Assarca shipwreck	Unknown	Early 7th century (presumed)	A wreck discovered at Black Assarca Island in 1995. It was excavated in 1997, and found to hold a cargo of amphoras.	

=== Kenya ===
Ship	Flag	Sunk date	Notes	Coordinates
Globe Star	Singapore	27 April 1973	A cargo ship that ran aground off Mombasa.	4.0818°S 39.72°E
Gulland	Aden	13 April 1951	A 545-ton Isles-class trawler built for World War II. It ran aground three miles (4.8 km) north of Mombasa.	04°02′50″S 39°43′57″E
Mtongwe	Tanzania	27 April 1994	A Likoni and Mombasa route ferry that capsized due to overcrowding off Kilindini Harbour. 270 people lost their lives.	

=== Mozambique ===
Ship	Flag	Sunk date	Notes	Coordinates
Katina P	Greece	26 April 1992	An oil tanker that was damaged in a storm, spilling several thousand tonnes of oil.	25°35′S 32°59′E
Sunny South	Royal Navy	20 February 1861	An American-built extreme clipper sold to Havana and put to work in the slave trade. It was captured by the Royal Navy and used as a store ship, before striking a reef and sinking at Mayotte.	13.048°S 45.195°E

=== Somalia ===
Ship	Flag	Sunk date	Notes	Coordinates
Achille Lauro	Italy	2 December 1994	A cruise ship that was hijacked in 1985 by the Palestinian Liberation Front. It ultimately sank nine years later, after an explosion in the engine room started a fire that engulfed the ship.	2°N 47°E
U-852	Kriegsmarine	3 May 1944	A Type IXD2 U-boat that was attacked by British aircraft and run aground near Bayla.	9°32′N 50°59′E

=== Tanzania ===
Ship	Flag	Sunk date	Notes	Coordinates
SMS Königsberg	Imperial German Navy	11 July 1915	A Königsberg-class light cruiser that was sunk in the Rufiji River.	7°52′6″S 39°14′24″E
HMS Pegasus	Royal Navy	20 September 1914	A Pelorus-class protected cruiser that was sunk at Zanzibar by SMS Königsberg.	6°8′54″S 39°11′36″E
Spice Islander I	Tanzania	10 September 2011	A RORO ferry that sank between Unguja and Pemba Island, with the loss of at least 200 lives.	5°39′23″S 39°28′27″E

=== Lake Victoria ===
Ship	Flag	Sunk date	Notes	Coordinates
Bukoba	Tanzania	21 May 1996	A Lake Victoria ferry that sank off Mwanza with over 200 confirmed dead.	1°59′2″S 32°19′7″E
Kabalega	Uganda	8 May 2005	A train ferry that collided with Kaawa near the Ssese Islands.	0°39′23″S 32°8′41″E

=== Lake Albert ===
Ship	Flag	Sunk date	Notes	Coordinates
Robert Coryndon	The Protectorate of Uganda	1962	A British ferry named after Robert Coryndon, Governor of Uganda (1918–1922).	

== Madagascar ==
Ship	Flag	Sunk date	Notes	Coordinates
Adventure Galley	England	April 1698	A galley that was captained by William Kidd, who ordered it burnt at Île Sainte-Marie.	
HMS Serapis	Royal Navy	July 1781	A Roebuck-class fifth rate that caught fire and sank off Île Sainte-Marie.	17°00′09″S 49°50′31″E

== North Africa ==
=== Algeria ===
Ship	Flag	Sunk date	Notes	Coordinates
HMS Algerine	Royal Navy	15 November 1942	An Algerine-class minesweeper that was torpedoed by the Italian submarine Ascianghi off Béjaïa.	36°45′N 05°11′E
City of Venice	Royal Navy	4 July 1943	A troopship that was torpedoed by the German submarine U-375.	36°44′N 1°31′E
HMS Ibis	Royal Navy	10 November 1942	A Black Swan-class sloop that was sunk by an Italian aircraft north of Algiers.	37°0′N 3°0′E
HMS Karanja	Royal Navy	12 November 1942	Troop carrier (infantry), former BI cargo liner. Sunk by German aircraft off Bougie (Béjaïa).	
USS Leedstown	United States Navy	9 November 1942	A troopship that was sunk by the German submarine U-331 off Algiers.	36°49′13″N 3°9′55″E
HMCS Louisburg	Royal Canadian Navy	6 February 1943	A Flower-class corvette that was sunk by German aircraft near Mostaganem.	36°15′N 00°15′E
HMT Narkunda	Royal Navy	14 November 1942	British P&O requisitioned troopship bombed and sunk by German aircraft. Sister ship Naldera. Located off Bougie (Béjaïa), Algeria, passing Cape Carbon.	36°52′N 05°01′E
HMT Rohna	Royal Navy	26 November 1943	A British troop carrier sunk north of Béjaïa in an air attack during World War II.	37°1′12″N 5°12′6″E
HMS Samphire	Royal Navy	30 January 1943	A Flower-class corvette that was torpedoed by an Italian submarine off Béjaïa.	36°56′0″N 5°40′0″E
Strathallen	Royal Navy	22 December 1942	A Strath-class liner that was being used as a troop transport was sunk by a German submarine off the coast of Algeria.	

=== Egypt ===
Ship	Flag	Sunk date	Notes	Coordinates
HMS Attack	Royal Navy	30 December 1917	An Acheron-class destroyer that was sunk northwest of Alexandria.	31°18′N 29°49′E
HMS Defender	Royal Navy	11 July 1941	A D-class destroyer that was attacked by a German bomber and sank under tow off Sidi Barrani.	31°45′N 25°31′E
L'Orient	French Navy	1 August 1798	An Océan-class ship of the line and Napoleon's flagship, destroyed by fire and explosion in Aboukir Bay during the Battle of the Nile.	
HMS Myngs	Royal Navy	16 May 1970	A Z-class destroyer that was sunk by Israeli aircraft in Foul Bay.	
Salem Express	France	14–15 December 1991	A roll-on/roll-off passenger ferry that ran aground at midnight on a reef near Safaga, sinking rapidly with the loss of at least 464 civilians.	26°38′22″N 34°3′39″E
HMS Salvia	Royal Navy	24 December 1941	A Flower-class corvette that was torpedoed by U-568 about 100 nautical miles (190 km; 120 mi) west of Alexandria.	31.46°N 28.00°E
Yolanda (Jolanda)	Cyprus	April 1980	A cargo ship that ran aground on a reef at Ras Muhammad.	

=== Libya ===
Ship	Flag	Sunk date	Notes	Coordinates
HMS Dainty	Royal Navy	24 February 1941	A D-class destroyer that was sunk by German bomber aircraft east of Tobruk.	32°4′24″N 24°4′42″E
HMS Ladybird	Royal Navy	12 May 1941	An Insect-class gunboat that was sunk by German dive bomber aircraft at Tobruk.	32°4′33″N 23°58′21″E
Shuntien	United Kingdom	23 December 1941	A passenger and cargo liner that was torpedoed by the German submarine U-559 east of Tobruk.	32.06°N 24.46°E
HMS Sikh	Royal Navy	14 September 1942	A Tribal-class destroyer that was sunk by shore batteries off Tobruk.	32°5′52″N 24°0′0″E
HMS Terror	Royal Navy	23 February 1941	An Erebus-class monitor that was attacked by German aircraft and sank under tow off Derna.	32°59′N 22°32′E
U-652	Kriegsmarine	2 June 1942	A Type VIIC U-boat that was attacked by a British aircraft and scuttled north of Bardia.	31°55′N 25°11′E
Yoma	Royal Navy	17 June 1941	A troopship that was torpedoed by the German submarine U-81 northwest of Derna.	33.03°N 22.04°E

=== Mauritania ===
Ship	Flag	Sunk date	Notes	Coordinates
Méduse	France	2 July 1816	A French passenger ship that sank near Bank of Arguin. The traumatic experience of the stranded passengers and crew was immortalized in Géricault's painting, The Raft of the Medusa.	20.0475°N 16.8090°W

=== Morocco/Western Sahara ===
Ship	Flag	Sunk date	Notes	Coordinates
Commerce	United States	1815	An American merchant ship that ran aground off Cape Bojador in what is now the Western Sahara. The surviving crew, led by Captain James Riley, were subsequently captured and taken as slaves by local tribes.	
Delhi	United Kingdom	12 December 1911	A steamship that ran aground in heavy fog. The Duke of Fife was rescued from the sinking ship, but contracted pleurisy and died soon afterward.	
Empire Barracuda	United Kingdom	15 December 1942	A cargo ship that was torpedoed by U-77 off Morocco.	35°30′N 06°17′W
USS Hugh L. Scott	United States Navy	12 November 1942	A Hugh L. Scott-class troopship that was torpedoed by U-130 off Casablanca.	33°40′N 7°35′W
HMS Lady Shirley	Royal Navy	11 December 1941	A warship that was torpedoed by U-374 in the Straits of Gibraltar.	35°59′N 5°17′W
Primauguet	French Navy	8 November 1942	A French Duguay-Trouin-class light cruiser, laid down in 1923, that was sunk by gunfire from USS Massachusetts.	
USS Tasker H. Bliss	United States Navy	13 November 1942	A Tasker H. Bliss-class troopship that was sunk by U-130 off Casablanca.	33°40′N 7°35′W
Taube	Germany	20 January 2009	The sailing yacht Taube, sailing for the (since abandoned) cultural exploration project Migrobirdo, capsized in heavy swell on the approach to the port of Mehdya on the Sebou River. Six youths of different nationalities drowned, while one German female survived. An investigation concluded that several factors contributed to the accident, including an untrained skipper, an inexperienced crew, overloading, and the absence of a clear line of command.	34°16′N 06°41′W
U-173	Kriegsmarine	16 November 1942	A Type IXC U-boat that was sunk by American destroyers off Casablanca.	33°40′N 07°35′W
U-204	Kriegsmarine	19 October 1941	A Type VIIC U-boat that was sunk by HMS Mallow and HMS Rochester near Tangier.	35°46′N 06°02′W
U-731	Kriegsmarine	15 May 1944	A Type VIIC U-boat that was sunk by British ships north of Tangier.	35°54′N 5°45′W
U-732	Kriegsmarine	31 October 1943	A Type VIIC U-boat that came under attack from British forces and was scuttled north of Tangier.	35°54′N 05°52′W

=== Tunisia ===
Ship	Flag	Sunk date	Notes	Coordinates
HMS Havock	Royal Navy	6 April 1942	A H-class destroyer that ran aground off Kelibia.	36°52′18″N 11°8′24″E
HMS Hostile	Royal Navy	23 August 1940	A H-class destroyer that struck a mine and was scuttled off Cap Bon.	36.8833°N 11.3167°E
Mahdia	Unknown	Unknown	An ancient shipwreck discovered near Mahdia in 1907. It is thought to date from around 80 BC.	35°31′55″N 8°47′15″E
HMS Manchester	Royal Navy	13 August 1942	A Town-class light cruiser that was sunk during Operation Pedestal.	36°50′0″N 11°10′0″E
USS PC-496	United States Navy	4 June 1943	A PC-461-class submarine chaser that sank off Bizerte.	37°23′0″N 9°52′0″E
USS Redwing	United States Navy	29 June 1943	A Lapwing-class minesweeper that capsized off Bizerte.	37°19′N 9°56′E

== Southern Africa ==
=== Malawi ===
Ship	Flag	Sunk date	Notes	Coordinates
Vipya	Nyasaland	30 July 1946	A Malawian ship owned by the Nyasaland Railway Company that set sail from Monkey Bay to Chilumba in Karonga, Malawi in 1946. It capsized en route with the loss of the entire crew.	

=== Namibia ===
Ship	Flag	Sunk date	Notes	Coordinates
Bom Jesus	Portugal		A Portuguese nau that set sail from Lisbon in 1533. It was discovered in 2008 on the coast near Oranjemund.	
Dunedin Star	United Kingdom	29 November 1942	A refrigerator ship that ran aground on the Skeleton Coast, 80 kilometres (50 mi) south of the Kunene River.	18.13°S 11.55°E
Eduard Bohlen	Germany	5 September 1909	A freighter that ran aground south of Conception Bay.	23°59′43″S 14°27′26″E
Frotamerica	Unknown	15 February 2013	The cargo ship ran aground at Lüderitz.	26°22′12″S 15°02′25″E
Natal Coast	South Africa	1955	A Durban steamer that ran aground on a sandbank in dense fog, about 18 kilometres (11 mi) north of Swakopmund. The crew were unharmed and were able to get off the ship once the area's coast guard arrived and allowed everyone off.	
Otavi	Unknown	1945	A steamer that ran aground in Spencer Bay.	25°43′56.4″S 014°50′00.2″E
Zeila	Unknown	25 August 2008	The ship ran aground 14 km (8.7 mi) south of Henties Bay.	22°14′28″S 14°21′13″E

=== South Africa ===
==== Eastern Cape ====
Ship	Flag	Sunk date	Notes	Coordinates
Bredenhof	Dutch East India Company	6 June 1753	A Dutch East Indiaman carrying copper duits, silver bars, and gold ducats, which hit a reef twenty-one kilometres (13 mi) from the eastern coast of Africa and 190 kilometres (120 mi) south of the Portuguese settlement of Mozambique. The wreck was discovered in 1986.	
Cordigliera	Unknown	16 November 1996	After placing a distress call to Durban Radio at 10:30 pm requesting immediate assistance due to a leak in a hold, the freighter sank off Port St Johns, South Africa, with the loss of all 23 lives.	
Doddington	East India Company	17 July 1755	An East Indiaman that was wrecked at Bird Island in Algoa Bay.	33°50.06′S 26°17.40′E
Grosvenor	East India Company	4 August 1782	An East Indiaman that was wrecked off the Pondoland coast.	31°22′26″S 29°54′53″E
Kapodistrias	Greece	1985	A Greek bulk carrier wrecked at Cape Recife near Port Elizabeth	34.042167°S 25.693317°E
Kiperousa	Unknown	2005	A bulk carrier that was stranded northeast of Port Alfred.	33°20′S 27°25′E
Meng Yaw	Unknown		A fishing trawler that sank near St Francis Bay.	34°10′S 24°30′E
Oceanos	Greece	4 August 1991	A cruise liner that sank off the Transkei coast, after leaving East London en route to Durban.	32.12093°S 29.12029°E
Santissimo Sacramento	Portugal	1647	A Portuguese vessel wrecked at Sardinia Bay near Port Elizabeth	34.04300°S 25.52033°E
Shalom	Bahamas	26 July 2001	A combined ocean liner/cruise ship that sank off Cape St. Francis while under tow to be scrapped.	
TMP Sagittarius	Unknown	July 2002	Stranded southwest of East London.	33°4′S 27°51′E

==== Natal ====
Ship	Flag	Sunk date	Notes	Coordinates
HMS Otus	Royal Navy	September 1946	An Odin-class submarine that was scuttled off Durban.	29°52′21″S 31°05′39″E
Phoenix	Equatorial Guinea	September 2011	A tanker that ran aground near Ballito on 26 July 2011, and was then refloated and scuttled offshore.	
Volo	Norway	6 March 1886	A barque that was stranded in the Bushman River.	

==== Western Cape ====
Ship	Flag	Sunk date	Notes	Coordinates
A.H. Stevens	Unknown	7 February 1962	Stranded in Shell Bay on Robben Island.	
Arniston	East India Company	30 May 1815	A British East Indiaman, requisitioned for troop transport, wrecked near Waenhuiskrans.	34°39′36″S 20°15′7″E
HMS Birkenhead	Royal Navy	26 February 1852	A British iron-hulled troopship that struck a submerged rock near Gansbaai. The chivalry of the soldiers in abandoning ship gave rise to the "women and children first" protocol.	34°38′42″S 19°17′9″E
BOS 400	France	26 June 1994	A derrick/lay barge that ran aground on Duiker point after breaking loose while being towed around the Cape Peninsula by the tug Tigr in a storm.	34°2′13.28″S 18°18′31.18″E
British Peer	United Kingdom	8 December 1896	A three-masted iron sailing ship that ran aground near the Cape of Good Hope.	33°30.4′S 18°18.70′E
Cospatrick	United Kingdom	17 November 1874	A wooden 3-masted full-rigged sailing ship that caught fire and sank south of the Cape of Good Hope, with a loss of 369 lives.	37°S 12°E
HMS Guardian	Royal Navy	24 December 1789	A 44-gun Roebuck-class ship laid down in 1780. Severely damaged by an iceberg, the ship was sailed 400 leagues (1,900 km) to the Cape of Good Hope, where it was intentionally grounded.	
Ikan Tanda	Singapore	2001	A cargo ship that ran aground near Cape Town, and was re-floated and scuttled 320 kilometres (200 mi) from shore.	
Johanna	East India Company	8 June 1682	An East Indiaman (the first to be wrecked off the South African coast) that sank near Cape Agulhas. A considerable amount of gold was on the ship.	34°46′58″S 19°40′46″E
Johanna Wagner	Prussia	15 July 1862	A Prussian barque that ran ashore due to navigational error near Muizenberg.	
Kakapo	United Kingdom	25 May 1900	A British 665-ton schooner-rigged steamship built in 1898 by the Grangemouth Dockyard Company	34°07′26″S 18°20′56″E
Maori	United Kingdom	5 August 1909	A Shaw Savill Line steamship that was wrecked near Llandudno, Cape Town.	
Meisho Maru No. 38	Japan	1982	A fishing trawler that sank near Cape Aghulas.	34°49′S 19°59′E
Nolloth	Unknown	Unknown	A coastal trading vessel that sunk near Olifantsbos Bay.	34°16′S 18°23′E
Pantalis A Lemos	Unknown	1978	A bulk carrier that sank near Saldanha Bay.	33°9′S 18°1′E
HMS Pelorus	Royal Navy	12 November 1994	A British Algerine-class minesweeper built in 1943. It was renamed SAS Pietermarizburg in 1947, and at the end of its career was scuttled to make an artificial reef at Miller's Point near Simon's Town.	
Phoenix	East India Company	19 July 1829	A merchant vessel that was wrecked near Simon's Town.	34°11.388′S 18°26.898′E
SAS President Kruger	South African Navy	18 February 1982	A South African frigate that sank in deep water after a collision with its refueling ship, SAS Tafelberg.	35°15′S 17°21′E
São José Paquete Africa	Portugal	27 December 1794	A Portuguese slave ship that was wrecked on the rocks off Cape Town, resulting in the deaths of over 200 slaves. The wreck was rediscovered in the 1980s, but was not identified until 2015.	
HMS Sceptre	Royal Navy	5 November 1799	A 64-gun third-rate ship of the line of the Royal Navy that was blown ashore in Table Bay by a gale, with heavy losses.	33°55′12″S 18°27′0″E
Seli 1	Turkey	18 September 2009	A Turkish bulk carrier carrying coal that ran aground on Bloubergstrand near Table Bay.	33°49′15.75″S 18°28′24.58″E
Staaten Generaal	Batavian Republic	1806	A Dutch ship of the line that was scuttled near Simon's Town to prevent her falling into enemy hands following the Battle of Blaauwberg.	
HMS Thames	Royal Navy	13 May 1947	A former Mersey-class protected cruiser that became famous as SATS General Botha, a merchant naval training ship. After retiring as a training ship, it reverted to its original name and was sunk in False Bay near Simon's Town as a target.	34°13′48″S 18°37′48″E
Thomas T. Tucker	United States	27 November 1942	A Houston-built munitions carrier that ran ashore on Oliphantsbos Point, near Cape Point.	34°16′23.66″S 18°22′48.33″E
Treasure	Panama	23 June 2000	A bulk ore carrier that developed a hole in its hull and sank under tow northwest of Cape Town, causing an oil spill that killed around 2,000 endangered African penguins.	33°40.30′S 18°19.90′E
Wafra	Liberia	28 February 1971	An oil tanker that grounded near Cape Agulhas, causing an oil spill. The ship was later refloated, towed out to sea, and re-sunk to avoid further contamination of the coastline.	36°57′S 20°42′E
Waterloo	United Kingdom	28 August 1842	A British convict ship that was driven ashore in Table Bay by a storm, together with the troop transport Abercrombie Robinson.	

== West Africa ==
Ship	Flag	Sunk date	Notes	Coordinates
Tor Hugo	Norway	27 November 1972	A Norwegian patrol boat that served in World War II before being sold off to civilian ownership as a fishing vessel.	

=== Cabo Verde ===
Ship	Flag	Sunk date	Notes	Coordinates
Hartwell	East India Company	22 May 1787	An East Indiaman that ran aground off Cape Verde following a mutiny.	

=== Nigeria ===
Ship	Flag	Sunk date	Notes	Coordinates
George	Nigeria	1 April 1999	A Nigerian and Port Harcourt to Nembe route ferry that capsized in rough sea off Port Harcourt. At least 100 people were killed.	

=== Senegal ===
Ship	Flag	Sunk date	Notes	Coordinates
William D. Lawrence	Canada		A full-rigged ship that sank off Dakar.	

=== Sierra Leone ===
Ship	Flag	Sunk date	Notes	Coordinates
Diemermeer	Dutch East India Company	1747	An East Indiaman that was wrecked off the Banana Islands, Sierra Leone. The wreck was rediscovered in 2014.	

=== The Gambia ===
Ship	Flag	Sunk date	Notes	Coordinates
Joola	Senegal	26 September 2002	A Senegalese passenger ship that capsized off the coast of the Gambia.	
