= List of shipwrecks in October 1941 =

The list of shipwrecks in October 1941 includes all ships sunk, foundered, grounded, or otherwise lost during October 1941.

== 1 October ==
List of shipwrecks: 1 October 1941
| Ship | State | Description |
|---|---|---|
| Astra | Estonia | World War II: The cargo ship was sunk at Oranienbaum, Soviet Union by German artillery. |
| Kaija | Latvia | World War II: The ship struck a mine and sank off Rossiten. Her eight crew were killed. |
| R-205 | Kriegsmarine | World War II: The auxiliary minesweeper was mined and sunk in the Baltic Sea near Liepāja, Latvia. |
| San Florentino | United Kingdom | World War II: Convoy ON 19: The tanker straggled behind the convoy. She was torpedoed and damaged in the Atlantic Ocean (52°50′N 34°40′W) by U-94 (Kriegsmarine) with the loss of 23 of her 58 crew. She broke in two the next day and was scuttled by HMCS Alberni (Royal Canadian Navy) and USCGC Campbell ( United States Coast Guard). Survivors were rescued by HMS Mayflower (Royal Navy). |
| Serenity | United Kingdom | World War II: The coastal tanker was bombed and damaged 10 nautical miles (19 km) off the St. Govans Lightship ( Trinity House) by Luftwaffe aircraft. She was repaired and returned to service. |
| No. 64 | Soviet Navy | The auxiliary minesweeper was lost on this date. |

== 2 October ==
List of shipwrecks: 2 October 1941
| Ship | State | Description |
|---|---|---|
| Castellon | Kriegsmarine | World War II: The cargo ship was torpedoed and sunk in the Mediterranean Sea 10 nautical miles (19 km) north west of Benghazi, Libya (32°30′N 19°09′E) by HMS Perseus (Royal Navy). |
| Churruca | United Kingdom | The cargo ship exploded and sank at Alexandria, Egypt. She was later salvaged, repaired and returned to service. |
| Empire Wave | United Kingdom | World War II: Convoy ON 19: The CAM ship was torpedoed and sunk in the Atlantic Ocean 500 nautical miles (930 km) east of Cape Farewell, Greenland (59°08′N 32°26′W) by U-562 (Kriegsmarine) with the loss of 29 of her 60 crew. The survivors, consisting of 23 crew, 6 gunners and 2 Royal Air Force personnel, were rescued by the fishing trawler Surprise ( Iceland) on 16 October. The other lifeboat went missing. |
| Hatasu | United Kingdom | World War II: Convoy ON 19: The cargo ship straggled behind the convoy. She was torpedoed and sunk in the Atlantic Ocean 600 nautical miles (1,100 km) east of Cape Race, Newfoundland by U-431 (Kriegsmarine) with the loss of 40 or her 47 crew. |
| Hertta | Finland | World War II: The schooner was rammed and sunk in the Kalmar Strait by Elin (Kriegsmarine). |
| I-61 | Imperial Japanese Navy | The Kaidai-class submarine collided with Kiso Maru (Imperial Japanese Navy) and sank in the Tsushima Strait off Iki Island (33°40′N 129°40′E) with 70 of her crew. Survivors rescued by Sata (Imperial Japanese Navy) on 14 October. She was salvaged in February 1942 and scrapped at Sasebo. |
| Tuva | Netherlands | World War II: Convoy ON 19A: The cargo ship was torpedoed and sunk in the Atlantic Ocean (54°16′N 26°36′W) by U-575 (Kriegsmarine) with the loss of one of her 35 crew. Survivors were rescued by HMCS St. Croix (Royal Canadian Navy). |

== 3 October ==
For the loss of the German cargo ship Yalova on this day, see the entry for 28 September 1941

List of shipwrecks: 3 October 1941
| Ship | State | Description |
|---|---|---|
| ARA Corrientes | Argentine Navy | ARA Corrientes The Buenos Aires-class destroyer collided with ARA Almirante Brown (Argentine Navy) and sank in the South Atlantic 54 nautical miles (100 km) north east of Mar del Plata with the loss of ten of her 169 crew. |
| Dnepr | Soviet Union | World War II: The passenger ship was torpedoed and sunk in the Black Sea by Luftwaffe aircraft with the loss of 40 of the 203 people on board. Survivors were rescued by Yakor (Soviet Navy). |
| Klara | Germany | World War II: The supply ship was torpedoed and sunk in the Atlantic Ocean north of the Azores, Portugal by HMS Kenya (Royal Navy). U-129 (Kriegsmarine) rescued her 119 crew. |
| Oued Yquem | Vichy France | World War II: The cargo ship was torpedoed and sunk in the Tyrrhenian Sea off Sardinia, Italy (40°58′N 9°59′E) by HNLMS O 21 (Royal Netherlands Navy). Her crew survived. |
| Sesnon 14 | United States | The barge sank in the Bering Sea 8 nautical miles (15 km; 9.2 mi) off Bluff, Territory of Alaska. |
| No. 114 | Soviet Navy | The G-5-class motor torpedo boat was lost on this date. |

== 4 October ==
List of shipwrecks: 4 October 1941
| Ship | State | Description |
|---|---|---|
| Borgny | Kriegsmarine | World War II: The tanker was torpedoed and sunk in the North Sea by HNoMS MTB 56 (Royal Norwegian Navy) with the loss of fourteen of her 27 crew. Survivors were rescued by M 1101 and V 5505 Seeteufel (both Kriegsmarine). |
| Théophile Gautier | Vichy France | World War II: The ocean liner was torpedoed and sunk in the Aegean Sea off Eubée, Greece (37°45′N 24°35′E) by HMS Talisman (Royal Navy) with the loss of nineteen lives. |
| U-111 | Kriegsmarine | World War II: The Type IXB submarine was shelled and sunk in the Atlantic Ocean south of Tenerife, Spain by HMT Lady Shirley (Royal Navy) with the loss of eight of her 52 crew. |
| Volochaevka | Soviet Navy | World War II: The incomplete Project SB-57/Vidlista-class river monitor was destroyed at the 300 Yard, Kiev to avoid capture by the Germans. |
| HMS Whippet | Royal Navy | World War II: The naval whaler was bombed and sunk in the Mediterranean Sea (32°09′N 25°17′E) north east of Bardiyah, Libya by Luftwaffe aircraft with the loss of a crew member. Survivors were rescued by HMT Svana and a D lighter (both Royal Navy). |

== 5 October ==
List of shipwrecks: 5 October 1941
| Ship | State | Description |
|---|---|---|
| C. Jon | Panama | World War II: The coaster was torpedoed and sunk in the Atlantic Ocean (48°30′N 13°00′W) by U-204 (Kriegsmarine). |
| Mondoc | Canada | World War II: The bulk carrier was wrecked on the east coast of Trinidad. |
| Olyokma | Soviet Navy | World War II: The auxiliary gunboat was sunk in Lake Ladoga by Luftwaffe aircraft. |
| Polaris | Soviet Union | World War II: The cargo ship was sunk at Orianenbaum by German artillery. |
| Rialto | Italy | World War II: The cargo ship was torpedoed and sunk in the Mediterranean Sea 80 nautical miles (150 km) north north east of Misrata, Libya (33°30′N 15°53′E) by Fairey Swordfish aircraft of 830 Squadron, Fleet Air Arm with the loss of twenty lives. Vincenzo Gioberti (Regia Marina) rescued 145 survivors. |
| Tynefield | United Kingdom | World War II: The tanker struck a mine and sank in the Suez Canal with the loss of four of her 38 crew. She was refloated in 1954 and scrapped. |
| No. 151 | Soviet Navy | The G-5-class motor torpedo boat was lost on this date. |
| No. 412 | Soviet Navy | World War II: The PK-115 Type MO-2 patrol boat was sunk by German artillery while supporting a landing operation between Oranienbaum and Leningrad. |

== 6 October ==
List of shipwrecks: 6 October 1941
| Ship | State | Description |
|---|---|---|
| Bjørnungen | Norway | World War II: The coaster was torpedoed and sunk in the Barents Sea by TKA-12 (Soviet Navy) with the loss of all eight people aboard. |
| Thistlegorm | United Kingdom | World War II: The cargo ship was bombed and sunk in the Red Sea off Ras Muhammad, Egypt (27°48′51″N 33°55′12″E) by Heinkel He 111 aircraft of II Staffeln, Kampfgeschwader 26, Luftwaffe with the loss of nine of her crew. |

== 7 October ==
List of shipwrecks: 7 October 1941
| Ship | State | Description |
|---|---|---|
| Aida | Egypt | World War II: The lighthouse tender was bombed and damaged at Zafarana by Luftwaffe aircraft. She was beached. |
| Blokshiv No. 1 | Soviet Navy | World War II: The mine storage hulk was shelled and sunk off Kronstadt by German artillery. She was salvaged and returned to service in 1942. |

== 8 October ==
List of shipwrecks: 8 October 1941
| Ship | State | Description |
|---|---|---|
| Grozny | Soviet Union | World War II: Soviet evacuation of Mariupol: The tanker was scuttled at Mariupol by the Red Army. |
| Pantelis | Greece | World War II: The cargo ship was torpedoed and sunk in the Indian Ocean (34°20′S 17°50′E) by U-172 (Kriegsmarine) with the loss of 28 of her 33 crew. |
| Paola Z. Podestà | Italy | World War II: The cargo ship was torpedoed and sunk south west of Favignana, Sicily, by Fairey Swordfish aircraft of 830 Squadron, Fleet Air Arm. |
| Recenia | United Kingdom | The 110.2-foot (33.6 m), 179-ton fishing trawler ran ashore on Barn Scar rocks, between Ravenglass and Seascale, Cumberland (54°24′N 03°32′W) and was declared a total loss. |
| Rosalie Moller | United Kingdom | World War II: The cargo ship was bombed and sunk in the Suez Canal by Heinkel He 111 aircraft of II Staffeln, Kampfgeschwader 26, Luftwaffe with the loss of two of her crew. Survivors were rescued by HMAS Parramatta (Royal Australian Navy). She was refloated post-war and scrapped. |
| Solombala | Soviet Union | The tug was shelled and sunk in the Black Sea off Mariupol by German shore-based artillery. |
| Tovarisch | Soviet Union | World War II: Soviet evacuation of Mariupol: The sailing ship was scuttled at Mariupol by the Red Army. |
| Volga-Don | Soviet Union | World War II: Soviet evacuation of Mariupol: The cargo ship was scuttled at Mariupol by the Red Army. |
| No. 21 | Soviet Navy | The G-5-class motor torpedo boat was lost on this date. |
| Unnamed | Soviet Union | World War II: Soviet evacuation of Mariupol: The floating dry dock was scuttled at Mariupol by the Red Army. |

== 10 October ==
List of shipwrecks: 9 October 1941
| Ship | State | Description |
|---|---|---|
| Città di Simi | Italy | World War II: The fishing trawler was sunk in the Mediterranean Sea 12 nautical miles (22 km) off Cape Sidero, Crete (35°31′N 26°25′E) by HMS Thunderbolt (Royal Navy). There were no casualties. |
| Fugloyjin | Faroe Islands | The fishing vessel was bombed and sunk at Klaksvík. She was later refloated, repaired and returned to service. |
| Kyma | Greece | World War II: The cargo ship was severely damaged in the North Sea (53°53′N 0°21′E) by a mine. She sank four days later. Her crew were rescued. The wreck was dispersed by explosives in 1948. |
| HMS LCT 102 | Royal Navy | World War II: Convoy OS 7: The Landing Craft, Tank was being carried as deck cargo on board Nailsea Manor (United Kingdom) and was lost when that ship was torpedoed and sunk. |
| HMS LCT 103 | Royal Navy | World War II: Convoy OS 7: The Landing Craft, Tank was lost in Home Waters. |
| Nailsea Manor | United Kingdom | World War II: Convoy OS 7: The cargo ship straggled behind the convoy. She was torpedoed and sunk in the Atlantic Ocean (18°45′N 21°18′W) by U-126 (Kriegsmarine). Her 42 crew were rescued by HMS Violet (Royal Navy). |
| NMS Regele Carol I | Royal Romanian Navy | World War II: The auxiliary minelayer struck a mine and sank in the Black Sea off Varna (43°10′N 28°01′E). Twenty-one crew were killed and four were wounded. |
| Warkworth | United Kingdom | World War II: The cargo ship collided with Selvistan (United Kingdom) and sank in the Atlantic Ocean 500 nautical miles (930 km) south south west of the Vestmann Islands (58°24′N 22°28′W) with the loss of thirteen of her crew. |
| No. 11 | Soviet Navy | The G-5-class motor torpedo boat was lost on this date. |

== 11 October ==
List of shipwrecks: 11 October 1941
| Ship | State | Description |
|---|---|---|
| Casaregis | Regia Marina | World War II: The cargo ship was torpedoed and sunk in the Mediterranean Sea (34°10′N 12°38′E) by Fairey Swordfish aircraft of 830 Squadron, Fleet Air Arm. All 295 people aboard survived. |
| FR 12 | Kriegsmarine | World War II: The FR 1-class minesweeper was mined and sunk in the Black Sea off Zatoka, Soviet Union. |
| Haytian | United Kingdom | World War II: The hulk was bombed and sunk in the English Channel off Portland, Dorset by Luftwaffe aircraft. |
| Icemaid | United Kingdom | World War II: The collier struck a mine and was damaged in the North Sea off the Shipwash Lightship ( Trinity House ). She was subsequently repaired and returned to Service. |
| Kondors | Soviet Union | World War II: The passenger ship was sunk in Moon Sound by Luftwaffe aircraft. |
| HMS ML 288 | Royal Navy | The Fairmile B motor launch foundered off Hartlepool, County Durham after being abandoned by her crew due to heavy weather. |
| MO-310 | Soviet Navy | World War II: The MO-4-class patrol vessel was severely damaged by a collision with S-322 (Soviet Navy). MO-310 was towed to Suukyul Bay, Gogland, and sank there on 13 October. She was raised on 20 October, but towing was impossible and she was scuttled on 8 December 1941. |
| NB-18 Mücke | Nazi Germany | World War II: The fishing trawler was sunk off Bergen, Norway by a Lockheed Hudson aircraft of the Royal Air Force. |
| Tonu | Soviet Union | World War II: The cargo ship was sunk at the Sudomech Shipyard, Leningrad by German artillery, or by Luftwaffe aircraft whilst under repair. |
| Zena | Italy | World War II: The cargo ship was torpedoed and sunk in the Mediterranean Sea south of Lampedusa (34°52′N 12°22′E) by Fairey Swordfish aircraft of 830 Squadron, Fleet Air Arm with the loss of one of the 120 people on board. |

== 12 October ==
List of shipwrecks: 12 October 1941
| Ship | State | Description |
|---|---|---|
| HMS TLC-2 and HMS TLC-7 | Royal Navy | World War II: The LCT Mk 1's were torpedoed and sunk in the Mediterranean Sea (32°08′N 24°56′E) by U-75 (Kriegsmarine). with the loss of 36 of the 37 people on board. The only survivor (from HMS TLC-7) was taken as a prisoner of war. |
| Berdyansk | Soviet Union | World War II: The cargo liner was scuttled at Taganrog by the Red Army. |
| Chevington | United Kingdom | World War II: Convoy FN 531: The cargo ship was torpedoed and sunk in the North Sea (52°59′36″N 1°52′00″E) by S-105 (Kriegsmarine) with the loss of nine of her crew. |
| Corte Real | Portugal | World War II: The cargo ship (2,044 GRT) was intercepted for inspection in the Atlantic Ocean 80 nautical miles (150 km) off Porto by U-83 (Kriegsmarine). Her 6 passengers and 36 crew were given 15 minutes notice to take to lifeboats, after which she was shelled, torpedoed and sunk. All boarded the only usable lifeboat that was towed by the U-boat for several hours and then reached safely the Portuguese coast. |
| Georgy Sedov | Soviet Union | World War II: The cargo liner was scuttled at Eisk by the Red Army. |
| Glynn | United Kingdom | World War II: The cargo ship was bombed and damaged in the North Sea (52°35′N 1°56′E) by Luftwaffe aircraft. She was scuttled by a Royal Navy ship. |
| Roy | Norway | World War II: Convoy FN 531: The cargo ship was torpedoed and sunk in the North Sea (52°59′36″N 1°52′00″E) by S-53 (Kriegsmarine) with the loss of three of her crew. Survivors were rescued by HMML 145 (Royal Navy). |
| S-8 | Soviet Navy | World War II: The S-class submarine struck a mine and sank in the Gulf of Finland north of Dagö, Estonia. |

== 13 October ==
List of shipwrecks: 13 October 1941
| Ship | State | Description |
|---|---|---|
| No. 311 | Soviet Navy | The MO-4-class motor anti-submarine boat was lost on this date. |

== 14 October ==
List of shipwrecks: 14 October 1941
| Ship | State | Description |
|---|---|---|
| Aingeru Guardakoa | Spain | World War II: The sailing ship was torpedoed and sunk in the Bay of Cádiz by U-204 (Kriegsmarine) with the loss of two of her seven crew. |
| Bainsizza | Italy | World War II: The cargo ship was torpedoed and damaged in the Mediterranean Sea by Fairey Swordfish aircraft of 830 Squadron, Fleet Air Arm. She was taken in tow by Max Barendt (Germany), which later passed the tow to Ciclope (Italy) but sank the next day (34°15′N 12°12′E). There were two dead and 248 survivors. |
| Bonita | Germany | The cargo ship collided with Bojan (Sweden) and sank south east of Trelleborg, Sweden with the loss of 21 of her 25 crew. |
| Chokai Maru | Imperial Japanese Navy | The auxiliary gunboat ran aground on the Minto Reef, Caroline Islands, and was wrecked. |
| HMS Fleur de Lys | Royal Navy | World War II: Convoy OG 75: The Flower-class corvette was torpedoed and sunk west of Gibraltar (36°00′N 6°30′W) by U-206 (Kriegsmarine) with the loss of 70 of her 73 crew. Survivors were rescued by a Spanish ship. |
| HMT Forerunner | Royal Navy | The naval trawler collided with another vessel and sank in the Thames Estuary. |
| Pleiadi | Regia Marina | World War II: The Spica-class torpedo boat sank at Tripoli, Libya after being bombed the day before by Royal Air Force aircraft. |
| UJ 1709 Carl Kämpf | Kriegsmarine | World War II: The Carl Kampf-class naval trawler/submarine chaser was torpedoed and sunk west of Lista, Norway (58°30′N 6°07′E) by Bristol Beaufort aircraft of 42 Squadron, Royal Air Force. Six of her crew were killed. |

== 15 October ==
List of shipwrecks: 15 October 1941
| Ship | State | Description |
|---|---|---|
| Adzharets | Soviet Union | World War II: The rescue ship was scuttled by the Red Army. |
| Chicherin | Soviet Union | World War II: The cargo liner was scuttled at Odessa by the Red Army. |
| Empire Heron | United Kingdom | World War II: Convoy SC 48: The cargo ship was torpedoed and sunk in the Atlantic Ocean (54°05′N 27°05′W) by U-568 (Kriegsmarine) with the loss of 39 of her 40 crew. The survivor was rescued by HMS Gladiolus (Royal Navy). |
| Ila | Norway | World War II: Convoy SC 48: The cargo ship was torpedoed and sunk in the Atlantic Ocean (53°36′N 29°57′W) by U-553 (Kriegsmarine) with the loss of fourteen of her 21 crew. Survivors were rescued by Mimosa (Free French Naval Forces). |
| Silvercedar | United Kingdom | World War II: Convoy SC 48: The cargo ship was torpedoed and sunk in the Atlantic Ocean (53°36′N 29°57′W) by U-553 (Kriegsmarine) with the loss of 21 of the 47 people on board. Survivors were rescued by Mimosa (Free French Naval Forces). |
| Vancouver Island | Canada | World War II: Convoy SC 48: The cargo ship was torpedoed and sunk in the Atlantic Ocean south west of Ireland (53°37′N 25°37′W) by U-558 (Kriegsmarine) with the loss of all 105 people on board. |

== 16 October ==
List of shipwrecks: 16 October 1941
| Ship | State | Description |
|---|---|---|
| Bold Venture | Panama | World War II: Convoy SC 48: The cargo ship was torpedoed and sunk in the Atlantic Ocean 500 nautical miles (930 km)) south west of Iceland (57°00′N 24°30′W) with the loss of eighteen of her 35 crew. Survivors were rescued by HMCS Wetaskiwin (Royal Canadian Navy). |
| Bolshevik | Soviet Union | World War II: The cargo ship was torpedoed and sunk in the Black Sea by Luftwaffe aircraft with the loss of sixteen of her 36 crew. Survivors were rescued by two Soviet Navy motor torpedo boats. |
| Karin | Soviet Union | World War II: The rescue tug was sunk in the Gulf of Finland east of Seskar by a mine. |

== 17 October ==
List of shipwrecks: 17 October 1941
| Ship | State | Description |
|---|---|---|
| Barfonn | Norway | World War II: Convoy SC 48: The tanker was torpedoed and sunk in the Atlantic Ocean (56°58′N 25°04′W) by U-432 (Kriegsmarine) with the loss of fourteen of her 40 crew. Survivors were rescued by HMCS Baddeck and HMCS Wetaskiwin (both Royal Canadian Navy). |
| Erviken | Norway | World War II: Convoy SC 48: The cargo ship was torpedoed and sunk in the Atlantic Ocean (57°00′N 24°30′W) by U-558 (Kriegsmarine) with the loss of 24 of her 38 crew. Survivors were rescued by HMS Abelia and HMS Veronica (both Royal Navy). |
| Evros | Greece | World War II: Convoy SC 48: The cargo ship was torpedoed and sunk in the Atlantic Ocean (57°01′N 24°20′W) by U-432 (Kriegsmarine) with the loss of all 32 crew. |
| HMS Gladiolus | Royal Navy | World War II: Convoy SC 48: The Flower-class corvette was torpedoed and sunk in the Atlantic Ocean (57°00′N 25°00′W) by U-558 (Kriegsmarine) with the loss of all 65 crew and the survivor from Empire Heron (United Kingdom). |
| Heenvliet | Netherlands | The coaster collided with Vestland (Norway) and sank in the Irish Sea off Strumble Head, Pembrokeshire, United Kingdom. |
| Krenkel | Soviet Navy | The auxiliary gunboat was severely damaged by German tanks and artillery while leaving Taganrog, and sank this day or two days later. Some of the passengers aboard were killed. |
| Leningrad | Soviet Union | World War II: The cargo ship was bombed and sunk at Yevpatoria by Luftwaffe aircraft. |
| Lingfield | United Kingdom | The cargo ship collided with another vessel and sank in the North Sea off the coast of Norfolk. |
| Pass of Balmaha | United Kingdom | World War II: Convoy Cultivate: The coastal tanker was torpedoed and sunk in the Mediterranean Sea (31°14′N 28°50′E) by U-97 (Kriegsmarine) with the loss of all twenty crew. |
| Rym | Norway | World War II: Convoy SC 48: The cargo ship was torpedoed and sunk in the Atlantic Ocean by U-558 (Kriegsmarine). Her 21 crew were rescued by HMS Veronica (Royal Navy). |
| Samos | Greece | World War II: Convoy Cultivate: The cargo ship was torpedoed and sunk in the Mediterranean Sea (31°14′N 28°50′E) by U-97 (Kriegsmarine) with the loss of 31 of her 34 crew. Survivors were rescued by HMS Cocker (Royal Navy). |
| Vesteraalen | Norway | World War II: The coaster (682 GRT) was torpedoed and sunk in the Norwegian Sea off Nuvsvåg (70°20′N 22°30′E) by Shch-402 (Soviet Navy). Depending on the source, there were estimated to be 59 or 60 dead, and 6 or 7 survivors. |
| W. C. Teagle | United Kingdom | World War II: Convoy SC 48: The cargo ship was torpedoed and sunk in the Atlantic Ocean (approximately 57°N 25°W) by U-558 (Kriegsmarine) with the loss of 30 of her 39 crew. Survivors were rescued by HMS Broadwater (Royal Navy). |
| No. 131 | Soviet Navy | The G-5-class motor torpedo boat) was lost on this date. |

== 18 October ==
List of shipwrecks: 18 October 1941
| Ship | State | Description |
|---|---|---|
| Argun | Soviet Union | World War II: The cargo ship was torpedoed and sunk in the Kola Inlet (69°30′N 33°30′E) by U-132 (Kriegsmarine). All aboard were rescued by Mgla (Soviet Union). |
| HMS Assurance | Royal Navy | The Assurance-class tug ran aground in Lough Foyle and was a total loss. |
| HMS Broadwater | Royal Navy | World War II: Convoy SC 48: The Town-class destroyer was torpedoed and sunk in the Atlantic Ocean south of Iceland (at 57°01′N 19°08′W) by U-101 (Kriegsmarine) with the loss of 44 of her 101 crew. Also lost were the survivors from Empire Heron, W C Teagle (both United Kingdom) and Erviken (Norway). Survivors were rescued by HMT Angle (Royal Navy) |
| Caterina | Italy | World War II: The cargo ship was bombed and damaged in the Mediterranean Sea by British aircraft. She sank the next day 62 nautical miles (115 km) north of Tripoli, Libya with the loss of fourteen of the 199 people on board. Also reported as torpedoed and damaged in the Mediterranean Sea 62 nautical miles (115 km) north of Tripoli by HMS Ursula (Royal Navy), then being taken in tow and sinking the next day. |
| Cuma | Italy | World War II: The cargo ship struck a mine and sank in the Mediterranean Sea (37°02′N 14°08′E). |
| Empire Ghyll | United Kingdom | World War II: The collier struck a mine and sank in the Thames Estuary (51°41′N 1°19′E) with the loss of seven of her crew. |
| Empire Grove | United Kingdom | The coaster ran aground at Long Peak, 2 nautical miles (3.7 km) south of Hartland Point, Devon. She was declared a constructive total loss. |
| Mahseer | United Kingdom | World War II: The cargo ship struck a mine and sank in the Thames Estuary (51°41′32″N 1°18′50″E). Her 97 crew were rescued. The wreck was dispersed by explosives in 1950. |
| Paula Faulbaums | Kriegsmarine | The cargo ship ran aground near Landsort, south of Stockholm, Sweden and developed a severe leak. She was anchored and here crew were taken ashore. She sank during the night. |
| SKR-11 Ural | Soviet Navy | World War II: The auxiliary guard boat was torpedoed and sunk in the approach to the White Sea (at 67°33′N 41°08′E) by U-132 (Kriegsmarine) with the loss of all 40 crew. |
| Soesterburg | Netherlands | World War II: Convoy SC 7: The cargo ship was torpedoed and sunk in the Atlantic Ocean (57°12′N 10°43′W) by U-101 (Kriegsmarine) with the loss of six of her crew. |

== 19 October ==
List of shipwrecks: 19 October 1941
| Ship | State | Description |
|---|---|---|
| Andromeda | Kriegsmarine | World War II: The coaster ran aground in Kongsfjord, Norway, and broke in two and sank in the next days before she could be retrieved. There were no casualties. |
| Baron Kelvin | United Kingdom | World War II: The cargo ship was torpedoed and sunk in the Mediterranean Sea 100 nautical miles (190 km) west of Tarifa, Spain by U-206 (Kriegsmarine) with the loss of 26 of her 42 crew. Survivors were rescued by HMS Duncan (Royal Navy) and Urola (Spain). |
| Campeche | Mexico | The cargo liner caught fire at Mazatlán. She was later scuttled off Azada Island. |
| Inverlee | United Kingdom | World War II: The tanker was torpedoed and damaged in the Atlantic Ocean 30 nautical miles (56 km) west south west of Cape Spartel, Morocco by U-204 (Kriegsmarine) with the loss of 21 of her 43 crew. Survivors were rescued by HMS Duncan and HMT Lady Hogarth (both Royal Navy). Inverlee sank later that day. |
| Lehigh | United States | World War II: The cargo ship was torpedoed and sunk in the Atlantic Ocean 75 nautical miles (139 km) off Freetown, Sierra Leone (8°26′N 14°37′W) by U-126 (Kriegsmarine). All 44 people on board were rescued, some of them by HMS Vimy (Royal Navy). |
| Rask | Norway | World War II: The coaster was bombed and sunk in the North Sea (52°08′N 6°23′W) by Luftwaffe aircraft with the loss of eight of her eighteen crew. Five of the survivors were rescued by Wallace Rose (United Kingdom), the others reached land. |
| Tower Field | United Kingdom | The cargo ship ran aground at Workington, Cumberland and broke in two. She was later salvaged, repaired and re-entered service as Empire Tower. |
| U-204 | Kriegsmarine | World War II: The Type VIIC submarine was depth charged and sunk in the Strait of Gibraltar by HMS Mallow and HMS Rochester (both Royal Navy) with the loss of all 46 crew. |

== 20 October ==
List of shipwrecks: 20 October 1941
| Ship | State | Description |
|---|---|---|
| Aldebaran | Regia Marina | World War II: The Spica-class torpedo boat struck a mine and sank in the Gulf of Athens (37°22′N 23°52′E) with the loss of ten of the 150 people on board. |
| Altair | Regia Marina | World War II: The Spica-class torpedo boat struck a mine and was damaged in the Gulf of Athens (37°22′N 23°52′E). She was taken in tow, but later sank with the loss of thirteen of the 136 people on board. |
| British Mariner | United Kingdom | World War II: The tanker was torpedoed and damaged in the Atlantic Ocean (7°43′N 14°20′W) by U-126 (Kriegsmarine) with the loss of three of her 51 crew. She was abandoned by the survivors, who were rescued by HMS Hudson (Royal Navy). British Mariner was towed to Freetown, Sierra Leone by Donau (Netherlands) and HMS Hudson. She was declared a constructive total loss. Thereafter served as a hulk at Freetown until scuttled in 1951. |
| Indra | Panama | The cargo ship departed from Bari, Italy for Huelva, Spain. No further trace. |

== 21 October ==
List of shipwrecks: 21 October 1941
| Ship | State | Description |
|---|---|---|
| Divana | France | World War II: The cargo ship was bombed and damaged in the Gulf of Hammamet by seven British aircraft and was beached with the loss of nine of her crew. |
| HMS Gnat | Royal Navy | World War II: The Insect-class gunboat was torpedoed and damaged in the Mediterranean Sea (32°08′N 25°22′E) by U-79 (Kriegsmarine. Her crew survived. She was declared a constructive total loss, but was later converted to a static anti-aircraft platform, stationed in the harbour of Alexandria, Egypt for the remainder of the war, and was scrapped in 1945. |
| Helen Barbara | United Kingdom | The tug was abandoned in a storm and foundered. |
| Hilda | Sweden | World War II: The cargo ship was bombed and sunk in the North Sea off IJmuiden, North Holland, Netherlands by Royal Air Force aircraft. Her crew were rescued by the German escort. |
| Johannes C Russ | Germany | The cargo ship was wrecked off Umeå, Sweden. She was salvaged, repaired and returned to service. |
| Kadio | Greece | The cargo ship caught fire after an accidental explosion of its cargo and sank at Suez, Egypt. There were no casualties. |
| M-58 | Soviet Navy | World War II: The M-class submarine struck a mine and sank in the Black Sea off the mouth of the Danube with the loss of all nineteen crew. |
| Serbino | United Kingdom | World War II: Convoy SL 89: The cargo ship was torpedoed and sunk in the Atlantic Ocean (51°10′N 19°20′W) by U-82 (Kriegsmarine) with the loss of fourteen of the 65 people on board Survivors were rescued by HMS Asphodel (Royal Navy). |
| Treverbyn | United Kingdom | World War II: Convoy SL 89: The cargo ship was torpedoed and sunk in the Atlantic Ocean (51°10′N 19°20′W) by U-82 (Kriegsmarine) with the loss of all 48 people on board. |

== 22 October ==
List of shipwrecks: 22 October 1941
| Ship | State | Description |
|---|---|---|
| Alder | Royal Navy | The naval trawler ran aground on the east coast of Scotland and was declared a total loss. |
| RFA Darkdale | Royal Fleet Auxiliary | World War II: The Dale-class oiler was torpedoed and sunk in the Atlantic Ocean at Jamestown, Saint Helena (15°55′30″S 5°43′15″W) by U-68 (Kriegsmarine) with the loss of 41 of her 49 crew. |
| F P 3 | United States | With no one on board, the scow was wrecked in Pavlof Bay on the south coast of the Alaska Peninsula in the Territory of Alaska. |
| Marigola | Italy | World War II: The cargo ship was torpedoed and damaged in the Mediterranean Sea off the coast of Tunisia (35°50′N 11°06′E) by HMS Urge (Royal Navy). She was shelled and damaged further on 30 October 2.3 nautical miles (4.3 km) off Kuriat Island by HMS Utmost (Royal Navy). HMS Urge torpedoed and sunk her on 1 November. |
| No. 13 | Soviet Navy | The G-5-class motor torpedo boat was lost on this date. |

== 23 October ==
List of shipwrecks: 23 October 1941
| Ship | State | Description |
|---|---|---|
| Aghia Paraskeva | Greece | World War II: The sailing vessel was rammed and sunk in the Gulf of Petali by HMS Triumph (Royal Navy). |
| Baltenland | Kriegsmarine | World War II: The cargo ship was torpedoed and sunk in the Baltic Sea (57°42′N 17°20′E) by SC-323 (Soviet Navy). |
| HMS Cossack | Royal Navy | World War II: Convoy HG 75: The Tribal-class destroyer was torpedoed and damaged in the Atlantic Ocean (35°56′N 10°04′W) by U-563 (Kriegsmarine) with the loss of 159 of her 219 crew. Survivors were rescued by HMS Carnation and HMS Legion (both Royal Navy). She was taken in tow on 25 October by the tug HMS Thames (Royal Navy) but the tow was slipped in stormy weather the next day. HMS Cossack sank on 27 October (35°12′N 8°17′W). |
| M-6 | Kriegsmarine | World War II: The Type 1935 minesweeper was sunk by mine off Lorient, Morbihan France with the loss of 21 of her crew. |
| Maria Pompei | Italy | World War II: The cargo ship struck a mine and sank in the Adriatic Sea 2 nautical miles (3.7 km) off Punta Platamoni, Kotor, Yugoslavia. |
| Ioannis | Greece | World War II: The caïque was shelled and sunk in the Gulf of Petali by HMS Triumph (Royal Navy). |
| Virginia S. | Germany | World War II: The cargo ship was torpedoed and sunk in the Mediterranean Sea (39°48′N 19°06′E) by HMS Truant (Royal Navy). There were no casualties. |

== 24 October ==
List of shipwrecks: 24 October 1941
| Ship | State | Description |
|---|---|---|
| Achille | Italy | World War II: The cargo ship was bombed and sunk in the Mediterranean Sea (38°26′N 11°24′E) by British aircraft. Twenty-one of her 26 crew were killed. The survivors reported that nineteen had survived the sinking but were killed when an aircraft strafed their boat. |
| Alhama | United Kingdom | World War II: Convoy HG 75: The cargo ship was torpedoed and sunk in the Atlantic Ocean (35°42′N 10°58′W) by U-564 (Kriegsmarine). Her 33 crew were rescued by Commandant Duboc (Free French Naval Forces), HMS Hesperus, HMS Lamerton and HMS Rochester (all Royal Navy). |
| Ariosto | United Kingdom | World War II: Convoy HG 75: The cargo ship was torpedoed and sunk in the Atlantic Ocean 300 nautical miles (560 km) west of Gibraltar (36°20′N 10°50′W) by U-564 (Kriegsmarine) with the loss of six of her 51 crew. Survivors were rescued by HMS Lamerton (Royal Navy) and Pacific (Sweden). |
| Carsbreck | United Kingdom | World War II: Convoy HG 75: The cargo ship was torpedoed and sunk in the Atlantic Ocean 300 nautical miles (560 km) west of Gibraltar (36°20′N 10°50′W) by U-564 (Kriegsmarine) with the loss of 23 of her 42 crew. Survivors were rescued by Commandant Duboc (Free French Naval Forces). |
| NMB B Brusterort | Royal Romanian Navy | World War II: The auxiliary minesweeper was mined and sunk in the Black Sea. |
| HMT Emilion | Royal Navy | World War II: The naval trawler struck a mine and sank in the Thames Estuary off the coast of Essex without loss of life. The wreck was subsequently dispersed by explosives as it was considered a danger to navigation. |
| Empire Guillemot | United Kingdom | World War II: The Design 1019 ship was torpedoed and sunk in the Mediterranean Sea west of La Galite, Tunisia by Savoia-Marchetti SM.79 aircraft of 283 Squadriglia, Regia Aeronautica, with the loss of twelve of her 45 crew. Survivors were taken as prisoners of war. |
| HMT Lucienne Jeanne | Royal Navy | World War II: The naval trawler struck a mine and sank in the Thames Estuary. |

== 25 October ==
List of shipwrecks: 25 October 1941
| Ship | State | Description |
|---|---|---|
| Albert H. Willis | Canada | The coaster ran aground off Freeport, Nova Scotia and was wrecked. |
| NMB D. Drossel | Royal Romanian Navy | World War II: The auxiliary minesweeper was mined and sunk in the Black Sea. |
| Galileo Ferraris | Regia Marina | World War II: The Archimede-class submarine was bombed and damaged west of Gibraltar by a Consolidated PBY Catalina aircraft of the Royal Air Force. HMS Lamerton (Royal Navy) was sent to intercept and engaged her with gunfire. Galileo Ferraris was scuttled by with the loss of five of her 49 crew. The survivors were rescued. |
| HMS Latona | Royal Navy | World War II: The Abdiel-class minelayer was bombed and sunk in the Mediterranean Sea (32°15′N 24°14′E) by Junkers Ju 87 aircraft of 1 Staffeln, Sturzkampfgeschwader 1, Luftwaffe, with the loss of sixteen of her 242 crew and seven of the 1,000 Polish soldiers on board. |
| Monrosa | Regia Marina | World War II: The cargo ship was torpedoed and sunk in the Aegean Sea (37°41′N 23°53′E) by HMS Triumph (Royal Navy) with the loss of 148 of the 265 people on board. |
| Patron | Soviet Navy | World War II: The Fugas-class minesweeper struck a mine and sank whilst on a voyage from Kronstadt to Hanko, Finland |
| Theresia Wallner | Kriegsmarine | World War II: The auxiliary river minelayer was mined and sunk in the Black Sea. |

== 26 October ==
List of shipwrecks: 26 October 1941
| Ship | State | Description |
|---|---|---|
| HMS Ariguani | Royal Navy | World War II: Convoy HG 75: The fighter catapult ship was torpedoed and damaged in the Atlantic Ocean (37°50′N 16°10′W) by U-83 (Kriegsmarine) with the loss of two crew and was abandoned. She was later reboarded and towed to Gibraltar by HMS Rollicker and HMS Thames (both Royal Navy). HMS Ariguani was decommissioned and laid up. She was later repaired and returned to merchant service in January 1944. |
| English Trader | United Kingdom | World War II: Convoy EC 90: The cargo ship ran aground on the Hammond Knoll, in the North Sea off Cromer, Norfolk (52°52′57″N 1°54′48″E) with the loss of three of her 47 crew. Survivors were rescued by H F Bailey III ( Royal National Lifeboat Institution). One lifeboatman was lost in the rescue. |
| Herta Engeline Fritzen | Kriegsmarine | The cargo ship ran aground at Hook of Holland, South Holland, Netherlands and was wrecked. |
| SF-35 | Kriegsmarine | World War II: The Siebel ferry was shelled and damaged in the Black Sea by M-35 (Soviet Navy). She was taken in tow, but consequently sank. |

== 27 October ==
List of shipwrecks: 27 October 1941
| Ship | State | Description |
|---|---|---|
| Antiope | United Kingdom | World War II: The cargo ship was bombed and sunk in the North Sea (53°10′45″N 1°06′00″E) by Luftwaffe aircraft with the loss of a crew member. The wreck was subsequently dispersed by explosives. |
| T-507 Delegate | Soviet Navy | World War II: The auxiliary minesweeper was bombed and sunk in the Black Sea off Kerch. |
| Friesland | Netherlands | World War II: The cargo ship was bombed and sunk in the North Sea (53°04′N 1°35′E) by Luftwaffe aircraft with the loss of thirteen of her crew. |
| Gunlög | Sweden | World War II: The cargo ship was bombed and sunk in the North Sea off Den Helder, North Holland by Royal Air Force aircraft. There were no casualties. |
| Volodarsky | Soviet Union | World War II: The tug was bombed and sunk in the Black Sea off Kerch. |
| Walnut | United Kingdom | The cargo ship departed from Liverpool, Lancashire for Newry, County Down. No further trace, lost with all nine crew. |

== 28 October ==
List of shipwrecks: 28 October 1941
| Ship | State | Description |
|---|---|---|
| Divatte | Free France | The cargo ship was driven ashore and sank at "Ras el Koran", near Bizerte, Algeria. The wreck was raised in 1946 and scrapped. |
| Esperia | Italy | World War II: The cargo ship was shelled and sunk in the Mediterranean Sea north east of Benghazi, Libya by HMS Thrasher (Royal Navy). There were no casualties. |
| Guglielmo Marconi | Regia Marina | World War II: The Marconi-class submarine was last reported on this date. She was probably sunk this day in the Atlantic Ocean by HMS Duncan (Royal Navy) with the loss of all 63 crew. |
| Hazelside | United Kingdom | World War II: The cargo ship was torpedoed and sunk in the Atlantic Ocean (23°10′S 1°36′E) off the coast of Cape Clear Island, County Cork, Ireland by U-68 (Kriegsmarine) with the loss of two of her 46 crew. Survivors were rescued by St. Ultan (Ireland). |
| King Malcolm | United Kingdom | World War II: Convoy SC 50: The cargo ship straggled behind the convoy. She was torpedoed and sunk in the Atlantic Ocean (47°40′N 51°15′W) by U-106 (Kriegsmarine) with the loss of all 38 crew. |
| Roslea | United Kingdom | World War II: The coaster ran aground on the Belgian coast in a storm. She was captured the next day by German forces and the crew were taken as prisoners of war. She was subsequently refloated and entered German service. |
| V 309 Martin Donandt | Kriegsmarine | World War II: The vorpostenboot struck a mine in the Baltic Sea off Ventspils, Latvia and sank with the loss of seven lives. |
| Ulea | United Kingdom | World War II: Convoy HG 75: The cargo ship was torpedoed and sunk in the Atlantic Ocean (41°17′N 21°40′W) by U-432 (Kriegsmarine with the loss of nineteen of the 28 people on board. Survivors were rescued by HMS Bluebell and HMS La Malouine (both Royal Navy). |

== 29 October ==
List of shipwrecks: 29 October 1941
| Ship | State | Description |
|---|---|---|
| Barcelona | Germany | World War II: The cargo ship was bombed and sunk in the Norwegian Sea off Ålesund, Norway by Royal Air Force aircraft. |
| HMT Flotta | Royal Navy | The naval trawler ran aground off Buchan Ness, Aberdeenshire. She foundered on 6 November. |
| MO-109 | Soviet Navy | World War II: The MO-4-class patrol boat was bombed and sunk in the Baltic Sea off the Shepelevski Lighthouse, near Leningrad, by Finnish aircraft. |
| Sarastone | United Kingdom | World War II: The cargo ship was bombed and sunk in the Atlantic Ocean (37°05′10″N 6°48′30″W) by Luftwaffe aircraft with the loss of one of her 29 crew. |
| Uralles | Soviet Union | World War II: The cargo ship was bombed and sunk in the Black Sea off Yevpatoria by Luftwaffe aircraft. |

== 30 October ==
List of shipwrecks: 30 October 1941
| Ship | State | Description |
|---|---|---|
| I-37 | Soviet Navy | The K-193 Type ZK patrol boat was lost on this date. |
| M-34 | Soviet Navy | World War II: The M-class submarine was sunk by a mine of a flanking barrage laid by the minelayers NMS Amiral Murgescu, NMS Dacia and NMS Regele Carol I (all Royal Romanian Navy). |
| Solskin | Norway | World War II: The coaster was bombed and sunk west of Eigerøya, Norway, by Royal Air Force aircraft with the loss of a crew member. |

== 31 October ==
List of shipwrecks: 31 October 1941
| Ship | State | Description |
|---|---|---|
| Bennekom | Netherlands | World War II: Convoy OS 10: The cargo ship was torpedoed and sunk in the Atlantic Ocean (51°20′N 23°40′W) by U-96 (Kriegsmarine) with the loss of eight of her 54 crew. Survivors were rescued by HMS Culver (Royal Navy). |
| British Fortune | United Kingdom | World War II: The tanker was bombed and sunk in the North Sea 1 nautical mile (1.9 km) off Aldeburgh, Suffolk by Luftwaffe aircraft. |
| M-1708 Aldebaran | Kriegsmarine | World War II: The auxiliary minesweeper was mined and sunk in the Baltic Sea off Liepāja, Latvia. |
| Meteor | Italy | World War II: The tanker was torpedoed and sunk in the Adriatic Sea south of Ortona by HMS Truant (Royal Navy) with the loss of fourteen of the 21 people on board. |
| Nicolaos Piangos | Greece | World War II: The cargo ship was bombed and sunk in the North Sea (51°58′45″N 1°37′30″E) by Luftwaffe aircraft. Eight of her 35 crew were killed. |
| USS Reuben James | United States Navy | World War II: Convoy HX 156: The Clemson-class destroyer was torpedoed and sunk in the Atlantic Ocean off Iceland (at 51°59′N 27°05′W) by U-552 (Kriegsmarine) with the loss of 115 of her 159 crew. Survivors were rescued by USS Hilary P. Jones and USS Niblack (both United States Navy). |
| Rose Schiaffino | United Kingdom | World War II: The cargo ship was torpedoed and sunk in the Atlantic Ocean 225 nautical miles (417 km) east of St. John's, Dominion of Newfoundland (approximately 48°N 50°W) by U-374 (Kriegsmarine) with the loss of all 41 crew. |

== Unknown date ==
List of shipwrecks: Unknown date October 1941
| Ship | State | Description |
|---|---|---|
| Shch-322 | Soviet Navy | World War II: The Shchuka-class submarine departed from Kronstadt on 11 October but was lost in the Baltic Sea in the next days with the loss of all 37 hands. She probably struck a mine. Her wreck was discovered in 2012. |
| HMS Tetrarch | Royal Navy | World War II: The T-class submarine disappeared in the Mediterranean Sea after a final communication with the submarine HMS Ultimatum (Royal Navy) on 27 October 1941. |
