= German submarine U-199 =

German World War II submarine

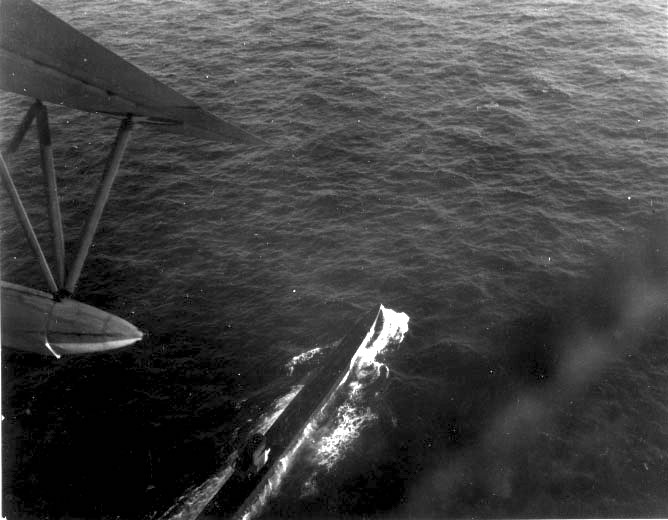
- U-199 under attack by Brazilian Air Force PBY Catalina Arará, notice the "short" conning tower of an early type IX D2.

History

Nazi Germany
- Name: U-199
- Ordered: 4 November 1940
- Builder: DeSchiMAG AG Weser, Bremen
- Yard number: 1045
- Laid down: 10 October 1941
- Launched: 11 July 1942
- Commissioned: 28 November 1942
- Fate: Sunk, 31 July 1943 by the Brazilian aircraft PBY Catalina Arará

General characteristics
- Class & type: Type IXD2 submarine
- Displacement: 1,610 t (1,580 long tons) surfaced; 1,799 t (1,771 long tons) submerged
- Length: 87.58 m (287 ft 4 in) o/a; 68.50 m (224 ft 9 in) pressure hull
- Beam: 7.50 m (24 ft 7 in) o/a; 4.40 m (14 ft 5 in)
- Height: 10.20 m (33 ft 6 in)
- Draught: 5.40 m (17 ft 9 in)
- Installed power: 9,000 PS (6,620 kW; 8,880 bhp) (diesels); 1,000 PS (740 kW; 990 shp) (electric)
- Propulsion: 2 shafts; 2 × diesel engines; 2 × electric motors
- Speed: 20.8 knots (38.5 km/h; 23.9 mph) surfaced; 6.9 knots (12.8 km/h; 7.9 mph) submerged
- Range: 12,750 nmi (23,610 km; 14,670 mi) at 10 knots (19 km/h; 12 mph) surfaced; 57 nmi (106 km; 66 mi) at 4 knots (7.4 km/h; 4.6 mph) submerged
- Test depth: Calculated crush depth: 230 m (750 ft)
- Complement: 55 - 64
- Armament: 6 × torpedo tubes (four bow, two stern); 24 × 53.3 cm (21 in) torpedoes; 1 × 10.5 cm (4.1 in) SK C/32 deck gun (150 rounds); 1 × 3.7 cm (1.5 in) SK C/30; 2 × 2 cm (0.79 in) C/30 anti-aircraft guns

Service record
- Part of: 4th U-boat Flotilla; 28 November 1942 - 30 April 1943; 12th U-boat Flotilla; 1 May - 31 July 1943
- Identification codes: M 50 247
- Commanders: Kptlt. Hans-Werner Kraus; 28 November 1942 - 31 July 1943
- Operations: 1 patrol: 13 May - 31 July 1943
- Victories: 2 merchant ships sunk (4,181 GRT)

German submarine U-199 was a Type IXD2 U-boat of Nazi Germany's Kriegsmarine during World War II.

The submarine was laid down on 10 October 1941 at the DeSchiMAG AG Weser yard at Bremen as yard number 1045, launched on 11 July 1942 and commissioned on 28 November. She was commanded by Ritterkreuz recipient Kapitänleutnant Hans-Werner Kraus, who had previously successfully commanded U-47 and U-83.

After training with the 4th U-boat Flotilla at Stettin, U-199 was transferred to the 12th U-boat Flotilla for front-line service from 1 May 1943.

She was sunk off the Brazilian coast on 31 July 1943 by the Brazilian Air Force Consolidated PBY Catalina flying boat Arará.

== Design ==
German Type IXD2 submarines were considerably larger than the original Type IXs. U-199 had a displacement of 1,610 tonnes (1,580 long tons) when at the surface and 1,799 tonnes (1,771 long tons) while submerged. The U-boat had a total length of 87.58 m (287 ft 4 in), a pressure hull length of 68.50 m (224 ft 9 in), a beam of 7.50 m (24 ft 7 in), a height of 10.20 m (33 ft 6 in), and a draught of 5.35 m (17 ft 7 in). The submarine was powered by two MAN M 9 V 40/46 supercharged four-stroke, nine-cylinder diesel engines plus two MWM RS34.5S six-cylinder four-stroke diesel engines for cruising, producing a total of 9,000 metric horsepower (6,620 kW; 8,880 shp) for use while surfaced, two Siemens-Schuckert 2 GU 345/34 double-acting electric motors producing a total of 1,000 shaft horsepower (1,010 PS; 750 kW) for use while submerged. She had two shafts and two 1.85 m (6 ft) propellers. The boat was capable of operating at depths of up to 200 metres (660 ft).

The submarine had a maximum surface speed of 20.8 knots (38.5 km/h; 23.9 mph) and a maximum submerged speed of 6.9 knots (12.8 km/h; 7.9 mph). When submerged, the boat could operate for 121 nautical miles (224 km; 139 mi) at 2 knots (3.7 km/h; 2.3 mph); when surfaced, she could travel 12,750 nautical miles (23,610 km; 14,670 mi) at 10 knots (19 km/h; 12 mph). U-199 was fitted with six 53.3 cm (21 in) torpedo tubes (four fitted at the bow and two at the stern), 24 torpedoes, one 10.5 cm (4.13 in) SK C/32 naval gun, 150 rounds, and a 3.7 cm (1.5 in) SK C/30 with 2,575 rounds as well as two 2 cm (0.79 in) C/30 anti-aircraft guns with 8,100 rounds. The boat had a complement of fifty-five.

== Operational history ==
U-199 sailed from Kiel on 13 May 1943 on her first and only operational patrol; she negotiated the gap between Iceland and the Faroe Islands before heading south, crossing the Equator by 17 June, targeting ships in the South Atlantic Ocean. Operating off the Brazilian coast, she torpedoed and damaged the Brazilian armed merchant ship Bury, which returned fire before escaping. On 4 July, the submarine was spotted on the surface by the small fishing boat Changri-Lá. The Brazilian boat was sunk with all hands by gunfire. U-199 had her first and only significant success, sinking the British merchant ship Henzada on 25 July.

=== Fate ===
U-199 was found on the surface, off Rio de Janeiro, in position 23°54′S 42°54′W, by three aircraft, a PBY Catalina, a Lockheed Hudson (both Brazilian), and an American Martin PBM Mariner of VP-74 on 31 July. The Catalina, codenamed Arará, hit U-199 with depth charges, sinking her. The pilot of the Catalina was 2º Ten.-Av. (2nd Lt.) Alberto M. Torres, who later went to Italy as part of 1st Brazilian Fighter Squadron. Forty-nine of the crew were killed, although twelve Germans, including the captain, escaped. This was possible due to the actions of the Catalina's crew, who threw a lifeboat to the survivors. They were rescued by the USS Barnegat and taken to Brazil, and then on to captivity in the United States.

== Summary of raiding history ==
Date	Name	Nationality	Tonnage (GRT)	Fate
4 July 1943	Changri-Lá	Brazil	20	Sunk
24 July 1943	Henzada	United Kingdom	4,161	Sunk

== Bibliography ==
- Busch, Rainer; Röll, Hans-Joachim (1999). German U-boat commanders of World War II : a biographical dictionary. Translated by Brooks, Geoffrey. London, Annapolis, Md: Greenhill Books, Naval Institute Press. ISBN 1-55750-186-6.
- Busch, Rainer; Röll, Hans-Joachim (1999). Deutsche U-Boot-Verluste von September 1939 bis Mai 1945 [German U-boat losses from September 1939 to May 1945]. Der U-Boot-Krieg (in German). Vol. IV. Hamburg, Berlin, Bonn: Mittler. ISBN 3-8132-0514-2.
- Gröner, Erich; Jung, Dieter; Maass, Martin (1991). U-boats and Mine Warfare Vessels. German Warships 1815–1945. Vol. 2. Translated by Thomas, Keith; Magowan, Rachel. London: Conway Maritime Press. ISBN 0-85177-593-4.
- Helgason, Guðmundur. "The Type IXD boat U-199". German U-boats of WWII - uboat.net.
