= Nemirovich-Danchenko =

Nemirovich-Danchenko may refer to:

== People ==
- Vladimir Nemirovich-Danchenko (1858–1943), Russian playwright and theatre director
- Vasily Nemirovich-Danchenko (1845–1936), Russian novelist and journalist, Vladimir Nemirovich-Danchenko's brother

== Ships ==
- SS Nemirovich Danchenko, a coaster in service 1946-71
