= Greek ship Tombazis =

At least two ships of the Hellenic Navy have borne the name Tombazis (Greek: Τομπάζης) after Greek naval hero Iakovos Tombazis:

- Greek corvette Tombazis, a Flower-class corvette launched in 1941 as HMS Tamarisk and transferred to Greece and renamed in 1943. She was scrapped in 1952.
- Greek destroyer Tombazis (D215), a Gearing-class destroyer launched in 1945 as USS Gurke she was transferred to Greece in 1977 and renamed. She was stricken in 1997.
