= German submarine U-206 =

German World War II submarine

Coordinates: 47°05′N 2°40′W

History

Nazi Germany
- Name: U-206
- Ordered: 16 October 1939
- Builder: Germaniawerft, Kiel
- Yard number: 635
- Laid down: 17 June 1940
- Launched: 4 April 1941
- Commissioned: 17 May 1941
- Fate: Missing since 29 November 1941 in the Bay of Biscay. Possibly sunk around 30 November 1941 off St. Nazaire in British minefield Beech.

General characteristics
- Class & type: Type VIIC submarine
- Displacement: 769 tonnes (757 long tons) surfaced; 871 t (857 long tons) submerged
- Length: 67.10 m (220 ft 2 in) o/a; 50.50 m (165 ft 8 in) pressure hull
- Beam: 6.20 m (20 ft 4 in) o/a; 4.70 m (15 ft 5 in) pressure hull
- Height: 9.60 m (31 ft 6 in)
- Draught: 4.74 m (15 ft 7 in)
- Installed power: 2,800–3,200 PS (2,100–2,400 kW; 2,800–3,200 bhp) (diesels); 750 PS (550 kW; 740 shp) (electric)
- Propulsion: 2 shafts; 2 × diesel engines; 2 × electric motors
- Speed: 17.7 knots (32.8 km/h; 20.4 mph) surfaced; 7.6 knots (14.1 km/h; 8.7 mph) submerged
- Range: 8,500 nmi (15,700 km; 9,800 mi) at 10 knots (19 km/h; 12 mph) surfaced; 80 nmi (150 km; 92 mi) at 4 knots (7.4 km/h; 4.6 mph) submerged
- Test depth: 230 m (750 ft); Crush depth: 250–295 m (820–968 ft)
- Complement: 4 officers, 40–56 enlisted
- Armament: 5 × 53.3 cm (21 in) torpedo tubes (four bow, one stern); 14 × G7e torpedoes or 26 TMA mines; 1 × 8.8 cm (3.46 in) deck gun(220 rounds); 1 x 2 cm (0.79 in) C/30 AA gun

Service record
- Part of: 3rd U-boat Flotilla; 17 May – 30 November 1941
- Identification codes: M 41 306
- Commanders: Oblt.z.S. / Kptlt. Herbert Opitz; 17 May – 30 November 1941
- Operations: 3 patrols: 1st patrol: 5 August – 10 September 1941; 2nd patrol: 30 September – 28 October 1941; 3rd patrol: 29 – 30 November 1941
- Victories: 2 merchant ships sunk (3,283 GRT); 1 warship sunk (925 tons)

German submarine U-206 was a Type VIIC U-boat of the Kriegsmarine during World War II. The submarine was laid down on 17 June 1940 by the Friedrich Krupp Germaniawerft yard at Kiel as yard number 635, launched on 4 April 1941 and commissioned on 17 May under the command of Oberleutnant zur See Herbert Opitz.

She was possibly sunk in November 1941 by a British-laid minefield.

== Design ==
German Type VIIC submarines were preceded by the shorter Type VIIB submarines. U-206 had a displacement of 769 tonnes (757 long tons) when at the surface and 871 tonnes (857 long tons) while submerged. She had a total length of 67.10 m (220 ft 2 in), a pressure hull length of 50.50 m (165 ft 8 in), a beam of 6.20 m (20 ft 4 in), a height of 9.60 m (31 ft 6 in), and a draught of 4.74 m (15 ft 7 in). The submarine was powered by two Germaniawerft F46 four-stroke, six-cylinder supercharged diesel engines producing a total of 2,800 to 3,200 metric horsepower (2,060 to 2,350 kW; 2,760 to 3,160 shp) for use while surfaced, two AEG GU 460/8–27 double-acting electric motors producing a total of 750 metric horsepower (550 kW; 740 shp) for use while submerged. She had two shafts and two 1.23 m (4 ft) propellers. The boat was capable of operating at depths of up to 230 metres (750 ft).

The submarine had a maximum surface speed of 17.7 knots (32.8 km/h; 20.4 mph) and a maximum submerged speed of 7.6 knots (14.1 km/h; 8.7 mph). When submerged, the boat could operate for 80 nautical miles (150 km; 92 mi) at 4 knots (7.4 km/h; 4.6 mph); when surfaced, she could travel 8,500 nautical miles (15,700 km; 9,800 mi) at 10 knots (19 km/h; 12 mph). U-206 was fitted with five 53.3 cm (21 in) torpedo tubes (four fitted at the bow and one at the stern), fourteen torpedoes, one 8.8 cm (3.46 in) SK C/35 naval gun, 220 rounds, and a 2 cm (0.79 in) C/30 anti-aircraft gun. The boat had a complement of between forty-four and sixty.

The partner city (Patenstadt) that sponsored the construction of the submarine was Reichenberg, and she bore the city's coat of arms.

== Service history ==
Part of the 3rd U-boat Flotilla, U-206 carried out three patrols in the North Atlantic:

=== First patrol ===
U-206's first patrol began when she left Trondheim in Norway on 5 August 1941; she travelled through the gap between Iceland and the Faroe Islands and headed south, towards the west of Ireland. She sank the Ocean Victor on 9 August south of Iceland.

On 26 August, U-206 rescued (against the regulations) from two rubber dinghies six British No. 612 Squadron RAF crew of the Armstrong Whitworth Whitley Mk. V, after its engine had failed during an anti-submarine patrol. They were brought to St. Nazaire, and later to POW camps; soon after the rescue, the British were able to smuggle intelligence back to Britain, describing the submarine and the St. Nazaire port. She was the first submarine that brought British POWs to France.

She arrived at St. Nazaire in occupied France on 10 September.

=== Second patrol ===
On her second foray, she sank HMS Fleur de Lys on 14 October 1941 55 nmi (102 km; 63 mi) west of Gibraltar and the Baron Kelvin, close to the Rock on the 19th.

=== Third patrol and loss ===
U-206 was posted missing from 29 November 1941. She is believed to have been the victim of a minefield laid by the RAF, (code-named 'Beech'), west of St. Nazaire. Forty-six men died; there were no survivors. The men were pronounced dead in March 1942.

=== Wolfpacks ===
U-206 took part in four wolfpacks, namely:

- Grönland (10 – 23 August 1941)
- Kurfürst (23 August – 2 September 1941)
- Seewolf (2 – 7 September 1941)
- Breslau (2 – 23 October 1941)

== Summary of raiding history ==
Date	Ship Name	Nationality	Tonnage (Note: Merchant ship tonnages are in gross register tons. Military vessels are listed by tons displacement.)	Fate
9 August 1941	Ocean Victor	United Kingdom	202	Sunk
14 October 1941	HMS Fleur de Lys	Royal Navy	925	Sunk
19 October 1941	Baron Kelvin	United Kingdom	3,081	Sunk

== Location ==
Since 2018, research to locate the submarine has been ongoing; some twenty possible wrecks have been identified, and dives are planned for 2020.

== Bibliography ==
- Busch, Rainer; Röll, Hans-Joachim (1999). German U-boat commanders of World War II : a biographical dictionary. Translated by Brooks, Geoffrey. London, Annapolis, Md: Greenhill Books, Naval Institute Press. ISBN 1-55750-186-6.
- Busch, Rainer; Röll, Hans-Joachim (1999). Deutsche U-Boot-Verluste von September 1939 bis Mai 1945 [German U-boat losses from September 1939 to May 1945]. Der U-Boot-Krieg (in German). Vol. IV. Hamburg, Berlin, Bonn: Mittler. ISBN 3-8132-0514-2.
- Gröner, Erich; Jung, Dieter; Maass, Martin (1991). U-boats and Mine Warfare Vessels. German Warships 1815–1945. Vol. 2. Translated by Thomas, Keith; Magowan, Rachel. London: Conway Maritime Press. ISBN 0-85177-593-4.
