= Hans-Werner Kraus =

German WW2 U-Boat commander

- Born: 1 July 1915; Beulwitz/Saalfeld
- Died: 25 May 1990 (aged 74); Wanger/Allgäu
- Military career
- Allegiance: Nazi Germany
- Branch: Kriegsmarine
- Service years: 1934–43
- Rank: Kapitänleutnant
- Units: SSS Gorch Fock cruiser Karlsruhe cruiser Königsberg; U-47
- Commands: U-83, U-199
- Conflicts: World War II: Battle of the Atlantic; Great Papago Escape
- Awards: Knight's Cross of the Iron Cross; Bronze Medal of Military Valor

Hans-Werner Kraus (1 July 1915 – 25 May 1990) was a German U-boat commander in the Kriegsmarine of Nazi Germany. He was a recipient of the Knight's Cross of the Iron Cross.

Kraus served as 1st watch officer on U-47 from January 1940 until November 1940 having replaced Engelbert Endrass. He later commanded U-83 and U-199.

He was on board the latter when it was attacked by Brazilian Air Force aircraft on 27 June 1943. Kraus evaded only to be targeted by a VP-74 Mariner (BuNo 6571) piloted by Lt. Harold C. Carey. The German crew shot it down and the crew were killed.

On 22 July 1943, the U-199 commanded by Kraus, nicknamed "Lobo Cinzento", attacked the fishing vessel "Shangri-lá", fatally killing at least 10 civilians in Cabo Frio, Rio de Janeiro, including Deocleciano Pereira da Costa. Later, his family would fill a lawsuit against the German Federal Republic in the Brazilian Federal Justice. The Brazilian Supreme Court (STF - Supremo Tribunal Federal), in a historical decision, removed the diplomatic immunity of the German Federal Republic, saing it was liable by acts of ius imperii that violated human rights even in the context of war.

Kraus was sunk by aircraft off the coast of Brazil on 31 July 1943. Captured, he was sent as a POW to the United States. Kraus was one of the 25 POWs who escaped from Camp Papago Park, Arizona, during the night of 23–24 December 1944 but was recaptured.

== Summary of career ==
=== Ships attacked ===
Date	U-boat	Ship	Nationality	Tonnage	Fate
12 October 1941	U-83	Eagle	United Kingdom	2,044	damaged
12 October 1941	U-83	Corte Real	Portugal	2,044	Sunk
20 October 1941	U-83	Indra	Panama	2,032	Sunk
26 October 1941	U-83	HMS Anguani	Royal Navy	6,746	Damaged
17 March 1942	U-83	Crista	United Kingdom	2,590	Damaged
8 June 1942	U-83	Esther *	Mandatory Palestine	100	Sunk
8 June 1942	U-83	Said	Egypt	231	Sunk
9 June 1942	U-83	Typhoon *	Mandatory Palestine	175	Sunk
13 June 1942	U-83	HMS Farouk	Royal Navy	96	Sunk
17 August 1942	U-83	Princess Marguerite	Canada	5,875	Sunk
27 June 1943	U-199	Charles Willson Peale	United States	7,176	damaged
4 July 1943	U-199	Changri-Lá	Brazil	20	Sunk
24 July 1943	U-199	Henzada	United Kingdom	4,161	Sunk
* Sailing vessel

=== Awards ===
- Wehrmacht Long Service Award 4th Class
- U-boat War Badge (1939) (29 April 1940)
- Medaglia di bronzo al Valore Militare (18 March 1942)
- Iron Cross (1939)
  - 2nd Class (8 July 1940)
  - 1st Class (28 September 1940)
- Knight's Cross of the Iron Cross on 19 June 1942 as Kapitänleutnant and commander of U-83
- Mentioned in the Wehrmachtbericht on 22 March 1942
