= Johanna Wagner (ship) =

Prussian barque wrecked in False Bay

Johanna Wagner was a Prussian barque of 600 tons, commanded by Captain Kempe.

The sailing ship was bound from Batavia to Amsterdam with a cargo of tobacco, sugar, coffee, India rubber, gallnuts, gum damar, and tin when she was wrecked at Strandfontein near Muizenberg, South Africa, on 15 July 1862. There were no deaths. Blame for the wreck was placed on the pilot refusing to use the services of a harbor pilot.

== See also ==
- List of shipwrecks of the Western Cape.
- Shipwrecks of Cape Town – Ships that were lost or scuttled along the coast
