= Seli 1 =

Turkish Bulk Carrier

Coordinates: 33°49′15.75″S 18°28′24.58″E

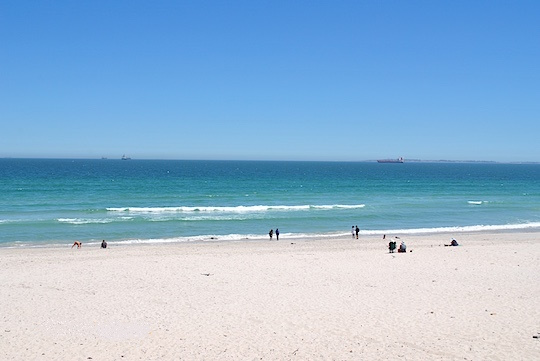
- Seli 1 sunken under the shores of Bloubergstrand

History
- Name: Seli 1
- Operator: TEB Maritime, Istanbul
- Port of registry: Panama
- Builder: Hyundai Heavy Industries
- Christened: Asia Sun
- Completed: 1980
- Renamed: Hyundai Sun (1986), Pacificator (1994), Toro (2002), Atduru (2006), Seli 1 (2007)
- Identification: IMO number: 7814149
- Fate: Wrecked at Bloubergstrand near Cape Town on 8 September 2009

General characteristics
- Class & type: Bulk carrier
- Tonnage: 30,500 DWT
- Length: 176 metres (577 ft)
- Beam: 26 metres (85 ft)
- Crew: 25

The MV Seli 1 was a Turkish bulk carrier, operated by TEB Maritime of Istanbul, that was en route to Gibraltar when it was driven aground off Bloubergstrand near Table Bay, South Africa by strong westerly winds shortly after midnight on 8 September 2009, having reported engine failure and a snapped anchor chain.

== Wreck ==
Panamanian-registered Seli 1, registered to Turkey's Ataduru Denizcilik, was carrying a cargo of 30,000 tons of coal, and 660 tons of heavy fuel oil with 60 tons of diesel fuel to Gibraltar when she suffered engine failure at Table Bay, South Africa. Strong westerly winds blew her from her anchorage shortly after midnight on 8 September 2009, driving her aground near Bloubergstrand, Cape Town. The 25-strong Turkish crew were rescued by the launch of Spirit of Rotary Blouberg from Station 18 and Spirit of Vodacom from Station 3 of the National Sea Rescue Institute.

The Seli 1 "sustained significant structural damage", but remained capable of being refloated. However, the indecision of the concerned parties led to delays in what initially should have been a simple salvage operation. The ship was extensively damaged by late winter storms, seriously jeopardising any plans to refloat it. SANCCOB reported that a total of 219 birds were oiled by a resulting spill.

Initial salvage operations focused on removal of 630,000 litres of oil from the ship. Removal of the hazardous fuel oil was contested by the salvage firms of Smit Amandla and Tsavliris, both of which claimed salvage contracts. Pumping the fuel took a few weeks during which period the weather remained calm, despite swells that enlarged substantial cracks in the main deck. The coal, which had been loaded in Durban, was eventually removed, eliminating virtually all risk of pollution. The ship's owners, despite abandoning the vessel, opposed selling the coal to defray removal costs.

The vessel was branded an eyesore and was clearly visible from tourist beaches and Table Mountain.

== Aftermath ==
=== Surfing ===
A positive side effect of the wreck's position was the forming of straight sand banks that created waves enjoyed by the surfing community. Dolphin Beach had produced a lackluster wave geometry before the ship’s stranding, but had now become a popular surf spot, well-populated on most days and had been the venue for a number of high-profile contests. Surfing the wreck involved a long and tricky paddle, and often the water was oily.

=== Fire ===
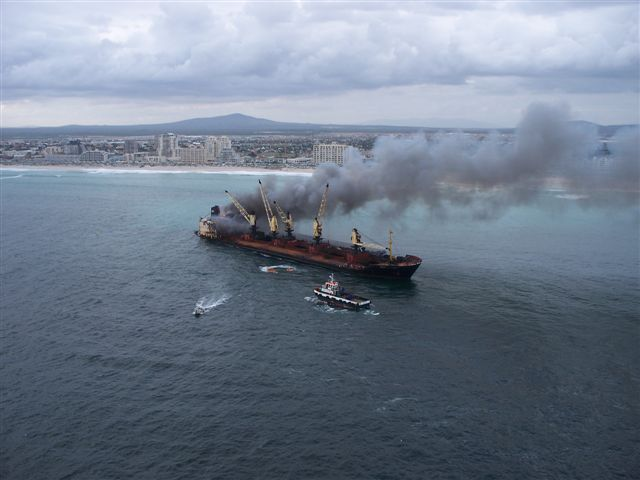
Seli 1 burning after salvors accidentally started a fire on the wreck

On 3 June 2010 the bridge and crew's quarters exploded and burnt, set on fire by the oxy-acetylene cutting torches of a team of 22 salvors from the South African Maritime Safety Authority (SAMSA) working on the ship, and who had to be rescued by the launch Spirit of Vodacom. Officials of SAMSA said they would take no action as the situation "could be dangerous", and that it would be left to burn. The City of Cape Town's fire chief officer confirmed that the National Ports Authority had been notified, and had declined to comment since it was outside normal office hours.

=== Removal ===
The piecemeal dismantling of the wreck was still under way in April 2011. A SAMSA spokesman stated they intended weakening the hull with explosives and that with the help of winter storms the vessel should be gone by the end of 2012.

On the night of Friday 31 August 2012 an oil slick was spotted on the coast, fouling nearby beaches and oiling hundreds of seabirds. It is suspected that rough seas caused the wreck to shift resulting in a kilometer-long oil slick that washed up on the beach. The Koeberg nuclear power station was placed on alert due to the proximity of the spill to its intake basin.

The Department of Transport announced a removal operation that would cost the taxpayer R40 million, to be managed by the South African Maritime Safety Authority, which was completed by the March of 2013.

The removal operation disposed of the wreckage by cutting the wreckage into smaller pieces, which would expedite the wreckage's collapse, and dispersion on the sea floor.

=== Marker Buoy ===
In 2015, The Coastal Management Department collaborated with Blue-Cape and Viking Safety Equipment, anchoring a marker buoy on the wreckage's shallowest point. This was to alert the users of the water of the sunken ship, which could possibly be a hazard.

== See also ==
- List of shipwrecks in South Africa
- Shipwrecks of Cape Town
