= HMS Rochester (L50) =

Sloop of the Royal Navy

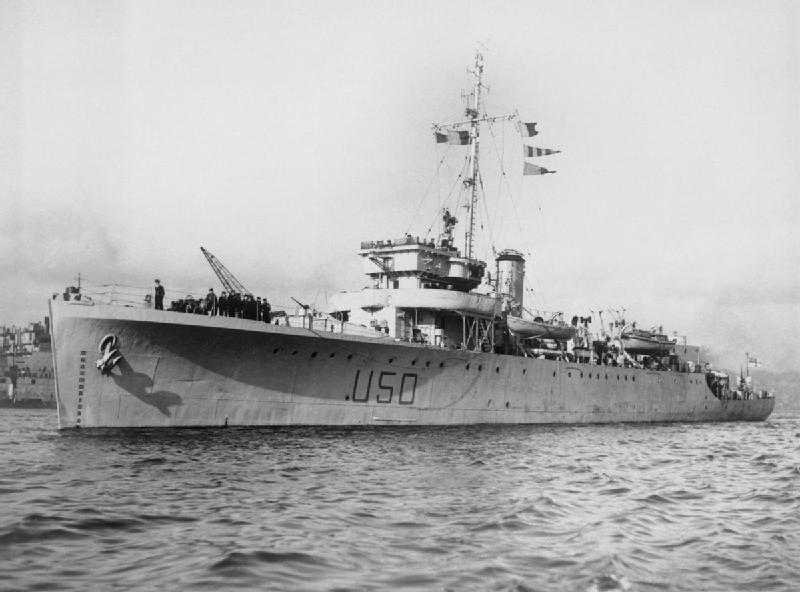
- HMS Rochester in 1945

History

United Kingdom
- Name: Rochester
- Builder: Chatham Dockyard
- Laid down: 24 November 1930
- Launched: 16 July 1931
- Completed: 24 March 1932
- Identification: Pennant number: L50 (later U50)
- Fate: Sold for scrap, January 1951

General characteristics
- Class & type: Shoreham-class sloop
- Displacement: 1,150 tons
- Length: 281 ft (86 m)
- Beam: 35 ft (11 m)
- Draught: 8 ft 3 in (2.51 m)
- Propulsion: Geared turbines; two shafts; 2,000 shp (1,500 kW)
- Speed: 16 knots (30 km/h)
- Complement: 95
- Armament: 2 × QF 4-inch (101.6 mm) Mk V guns (2×1); 4 .5" MG A/A (1×4)

HMS Rochester (L50) was a Shoreham-class sloop of the Royal Navy. She served during the Second World War and was a successful anti-submarine warfare vessel, being credited with the destruction of five U-boats.

== Construction ==
Rochester was ordered on 4 December 1929 under the 1929 Building Programme from HM Dockyard at Chatham, Kent. She was laid down on 24 November 1930, launched 16 July 1931, and completed 24 March 1932. Designed as a general-purpose vessel, Rochester served on the South Atlantic and East Indies stations on patrol and contraband control until the outbreak of hostilities in September 1939.

Rochester underwent several modifications while in service; in winter 1939 she refitted as a convoy escort. In June 1941 she received Type 271 radar. In May 1942 she was equipped with Type 291 air defence radar and HF/DF.

== Service history ==
At the outbreak of the Second World War Rochester returned to the UK for refitting, and in March 1940 was deployed to convoy escort in the Western Approaches. In July 1940 she assisted in the destruction of U-26, which was attacking convoy OA 175.

After a further refit in summer 1940, after which her pennant number was changed to U50 Rochester returned to the North Atlantic.

In May 1941, while escorting convoy OB 318 with 7th Escort Group, Rochester and two others attacked and damaged U-94, forcing her to break off the attack and retire.

After a further refit, Rochester was assigned to 37 EG, deployed as convoy escort on the Gibraltar and South Atlantic routes. On 19 October 1941, while with convoy HG 75, Rochester together with the corvette HMS Mallow sank U-204 by depth charges. In February 1942, with 43 EG escorting convoy OS 18, Rochester and corvette Tamarisk intercepted U-82 in transit from US East Coast and destroyed her.

In July 1942, while with OS 35, Rochester took part in the destruction of U-213. In the autumn of 1942 Rochester was part of the naval force for Operation Torch.

In July 1943 Rochester, with OS 51 as part of 39 EG took part in the destruction of U-135.

In October 1943 Rochester and 39 EG, escorting convoy SL 138/MKS 28, were involved in a five-day battle with Schill U-boat group resulting in the loss of one ship sunk and one U-boat destroyed.

In summer 1944 Rochester was involved in Operation Neptune, the naval component of the Normandy landings. In June 1944 she was in action with a U-boat in the English Channel. The U-boat (possibly U-988) escaped, though corvette Pink was damaged.

In November 1944 Rochester went for final refit, decommissioning as an escort vessel and re-equipping as a training ship. In March 1945 she joined the establishment of HMS Dryad, the navigation school at Portsmouth.

In September 1949 Rochester was decommissioned for the final time and in January 1951 was sold for scrap.

== Battle Honours ==
During her service Rochester was awarded three battle honours.

- Atlantic 1939–45
- North Africa 1942
- Normandy 1944

== Successes ==
During her service Rochester was credited with the destruction of five U-boats:

Date	U-boat	Type	Location	Notes
3 July 1940	U-26	IA	SW of Bishop's Rock; 48°03′N 11°30′W	d/c by Gladiolus, Sund H/10Sqdn, gunfire and ramming by Rochester
19 October 1941	U-204	VIIC	Straits of Gibraltar; 36°46′N 06°02′W	d/c by Rochester, Mallow off Cape Spartel
6 February 1942	U-82	VIIC	NE of Azores; 44°10′N 23°52′W	encountered OS 18, sunk by Rochester, Tamarisk
31 July 1942	U-213	VIIC	S of Azores; 36°45′N 22°50′W	attacked OS 35, d/c by Erne, Sandwich and Rochester
15 July 1943	U-135	VIIC	E of Canary Islands; 28°20′N 13°17′W	attacked OS 51, sunk by Rochester, Mignonette, Balsam
