= German submarine U-204 =

German World War II submarine

Coordinates: 35°46′N 6°02′W

History

Nazi Germany
- Name: U-204
- Ordered: 23 September 1939
- Builder: Germaniawerft, Kiel
- Yard number: 633
- Laid down: 22 April 1940
- Launched: 23 January 1941
- Commissioned: 8 March 1941
- Fate: Sunk, 19 October 1941

General characteristics
- Class & type: Type VIIC submarine
- Displacement: 769 tonnes (757 long tons) surfaced; 871 t (857 long tons) submerged
- Length: 67.10 m (220 ft 2 in) o/a; 50.50 m (165 ft 8 in) pressure hull
- Beam: 6.20 m (20 ft 4 in) o/a; 4.70 m (15 ft 5 in) pressure hull
- Height: 9.60 m (31 ft 6 in)
- Draught: 4.74 m (15 ft 7 in)
- Installed power: 2,800–3,200 PS (2,100–2,400 kW; 2,800–3,200 bhp) (diesels); 750 PS (550 kW; 740 shp) (electric)
- Propulsion: 2 shafts; 2 × diesel engines; 2 × electric motors
- Speed: 17.7 knots (32.8 km/h; 20.4 mph) surfaced; 7.6 knots (14.1 km/h; 8.7 mph) submerged
- Range: 8,500 nmi (15,700 km; 9,800 mi) at 10 knots (19 km/h; 12 mph) surfaced; 80 nmi (150 km; 92 mi) at 4 knots (7.4 km/h; 4.6 mph) submerged
- Test depth: 230 m (750 ft); Crush depth: 250–295 m (820–968 ft)
- Complement: 4 officers, 40–56 enlisted
- Armament: 5 × 53.3 cm (21 in) torpedo tubes (four bow, one stern); 14 × G7e torpedoes or 26 TMA mines; 1 × 8.8 cm (3.46 in) deck gun (220 rounds); 1 x 2 cm (0.79 in) C/30 AA gun

Service record
- Part of: 1st U-boat Flotilla; 8 March – 19 October 1941
- Identification codes: M 37 084
- Commanders: Oblt.z.S. / Kptlt. Walter Kell; 8 March – 19 October 1941
- Operations: 3 patrols: 1st patrol: 24 May – 27 June 1941; 2nd patrol: 22 July – 22 August 1941; 3rd patrol: 20 September – 19 October 1941
- Victories: 4 merchant ships sunk (17,157 GRT); 1 warship sunk (1,060 tons)

German submarine U-204 was a Type VIIC U-boat of the Kriegsmarine during World War II. The submarine was laid down on 22 April 1940 by the Friedrich Krupp Germaniawerft yard at Kiel as yard number 633, launched on 23 January 1941 and commissioned on 8 March under the command of Oberleutnant zur See Walter Kell.

She was sunk on 19 October 1941 by British warships.

== Design ==
German Type VIIC submarines were preceded by the shorter Type VIIB submarines. U-204 had a displacement of 769 tonnes (757 long tons) when at the surface and 871 tonnes (857 long tons) while submerged. She had a total length of 67.10 m (220 ft 2 in), a pressure hull length of 50.50 m (165 ft 8 in), a beam of 6.20 m (20 ft 4 in), a height of 9.60 m (31 ft 6 in), and a draught of 4.74 m (15 ft 7 in). The submarine was powered by two Germaniawerft F46 four-stroke, six-cylinder supercharged diesel engines producing a total of 2,800 to 3,200 metric horsepower (2,060 to 2,350 kW; 2,760 to 3,160 shp) for use while surfaced, two AEG GU 460/8–27 double-acting electric motors producing a total of 750 metric horsepower (550 kW; 740 shp) for use while submerged. She had two shafts and two 1.23 m (4 ft) propellers. The boat was capable of operating at depths of up to 230 metres (750 ft).

The submarine had a maximum surface speed of 17.7 knots (32.8 km/h; 20.4 mph) and a maximum submerged speed of 7.6 knots (14.1 km/h; 8.7 mph). When submerged, the boat could operate for 80 nautical miles (150 km; 92 mi) at 4 knots (7.4 km/h; 4.6 mph); when surfaced, she could travel 8,500 nautical miles (15,700 km; 9,800 mi) at 10 knots (19 km/h; 12 mph). U-204 was fitted with five 53.3 cm (21 in) torpedo tubes (four fitted at the bow and one at the stern), fourteen torpedoes, one 8.8 cm (3.46 in) SK C/35 naval gun, 220 rounds, and a 2 cm (0.79 in) C/30 anti-aircraft gun. The boat had a complement of between forty-four and sixty.

== Service history ==
Part of the 1st U-boat Flotilla, U-204 carried out three patrols in the North Atlantic.

=== First patrol ===
U-204's first patrol began when she left Kiel on 24 May 1941; she travelled through the gap between Greenland and Iceland (the Denmark Strait) and sank the Icelandic fishing boat Holsteinn with gunfire, south of Iceland on 31 May – Kell did not want news of the U-boat's presence to be broadcast. She then sank Mercier east of Newfoundland on 10 June. She docked at Brest in occupied France, on the 27th.

=== Second patrol ===
Nearly a month passed before the boat sortied again. On 2 August she spotted Allied convoy SL81 and called for support. When U-401 arrived the following day, they attacked together but without success. On 18 August she joined a wolfpack searching for Convoy OG 71 and shortly after 0100 the next day she struck HNoMS Bath with two torpedoes into the starboard side of her engine room, causing the destroyer to sink within three minutes at about 400 nmi (740 km; 460 mi) southwest of Ireland. Eighty-four of Bath's crew including her CO Lieutenant Commander Frederik Melsom were killed and two of the 42 survivors died aboard HMS Hydrangea after being rescued; the death toll was compounded by the fact that two depth charges exploded when the vessel went down.

=== Third patrol and loss ===
Having left Brest on 20 September 1941, she sank the Spanish sailing ship Aingeru Guardakoa with a single torpedo on 14 October, thinking she was a British submarine chaser. She then sank Inverlee on the 19th. On the same day, she fell victim to a British anti-submarine sweep from Gibraltar. She was sunk by depth charges from the corvette HMS Mallow and the sloop HMS Rochester.

Forty-six men died; there were no survivors.

=== Wolfpacks ===
U-204 took part in three wolfpacks, namely:

- West (5 – 16 June 1941)
- Kurfürst (16 – 20 June 1941)
- Breslau (5 – 19 October 1941)

== Summary of raiding history ==
Date	Ship Name	Nationality	Tonnage (Note: Merchant ship tonnages are in gross register tons. Military vessels are listed by tons displacement.)	Fate
31 May 1941	Holsteinn	Iceland	16	Sunk
10 June 1941	Mercier	Belgium	7,886	Sunk
19 August 1941	HNoMS Bath	Royal Norwegian Navy	1,060	Sunk
14 October 1941	Aingeru Guardakoa	Spain	97	Sunk
19 October 1941	Inverlee	United Kingdom	9,158	Sunk

== Bibliography ==
- Busch, Rainer; Röll, Hans-Joachim (1999). German U-boat commanders of World War II : a biographical dictionary. Translated by Brooks, Geoffrey. London, Annapolis, Md: Greenhill Books, Naval Institute Press. ISBN 1-55750-186-6.
- Busch, Rainer; Röll, Hans-Joachim (1999). Deutsche U-Boot-Verluste von September 1939 bis Mai 1945 [German U-boat losses from September 1939 to May 1945]. Der U-Boot-Krieg (in German). Vol. IV. Hamburg, Berlin, Bonn: Mittler. ISBN 3-8132-0514-2.
- Edwards, Bernard (2009). The Cruel Sea Retold. South Yorkshire: Pen & Sword Military. ISBN 978-1-84415-863-8.
- Gröner, Erich; Jung, Dieter; Maass, Martin (1991). U-boats and Mine Warfare Vessels. German Warships 1815–1945. Vol. 2. Translated by Thomas, Keith; Magowan, Rachel. London: Conway Maritime Press. ISBN 0-85177-593-4.
