= Ikan Tanda =

Cargo ship built in 1979

History
- Name: Amazon (1979-1988) Ikan Tanda (1988-2001)
- Owner: PACC Ship Managers Pte. Ltd
- Port of registry: Singapore
- Launched: 25 March 1978
- Out of service: 5 September 2001
- Identification: IMO number: 7640469
- Fate: Stranded 5 September 2001, refloated and scuttled 27 October 2001

General characteristics
- Tonnage: 17,800 DWT
- Length: 145.5 m (477 ft)
- Beam: 13.1 m (43 ft)
- Draft: 13.1 m (43 ft)

Ikan Tanda was a Japanese built cargo carrier which ran aground off the coast of Cape Town, South Africa, in 2001.

== History ==
The Ikan Tanda was completed in 1979 as the Amazon by Ishikawajima Kure of Japan. The 17,800 DWT vessel was later sold to PACC Ship Managers Pte. Ltd. of Singapore.

== Wreck ==
On 5 September 2001, the ship suffered a fire in its engine room and suffered a loss of power about 40 km from Cape Town, South Africa. This normally would not have been a severe problem; however, the ship was in a major storm at the time and began drifting toward land. The ship drifted for 3 hours until it was in shallow enough water to drop anchor, but the 10-metre-high (33 ft) seas and 50-knot winds overpowered the anchors and drove the vessel aground near the Slangkop lighthouse.

=== Salvaging efforts ===
The crew of the Ikan Tanda were rescued by Oryx helicopters of the South African Air Force (SAAF), and a salvage tug, the John Ross, was dispatched to aid in the recovery of the ship. Ultimately, the ship was re-floated, but was scuttled 200 miles west of Cape Town.
