= German submarine U-83 (1940) =

German World War II submarine

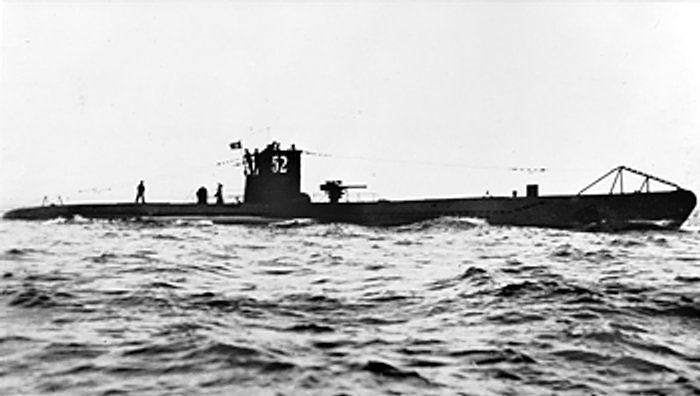
- U-52, a typical Type VIIB boat

History

Nazi Germany
- Name: U-83
- Ordered: 9 June 1938
- Builder: Flender Werke, Lübeck
- Yard number: 291
- Laid down: 5 October 1939
- Launched: 9 December 1940
- Commissioned: 8 February 1941
- Fate: Sunk, 4 March 1943
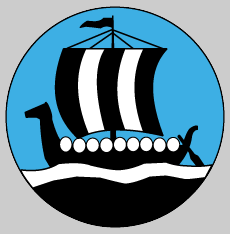
- Badge

General characteristics
- Class & type: Type VIIB submarine
- Displacement: 753 tonnes (741 long tons) surfaced; 857 t (843 long tons) submerged
- Length: 66.50 m (218 ft 2 in) o/a; 48.80 m (160 ft 1 in) pressure hull
- Beam: 6.20 m (20 ft 4 in) o/a; 4.70 m (15 ft 5 in) pressure hull
- Height: 9.50 m (31 ft 2 in)
- Draught: 4.74 m (15 ft 7 in)
- Installed power: 2,800–3,200 PS (2,100–2,400 kW; 2,800–3,200 bhp) (diesels); 750 PS (550 kW; 740 shp) (electric)
- Propulsion: 2 shafts; 2 × diesel engines; 2 × electric motors
- Speed: 17.9 knots (33.2 km/h; 20.6 mph) surfaced; 8 knots (15 km/h; 9.2 mph) submerged
- Range: 9,400 nmi (17,400 km; 10,800 mi) at 10 knots (19 km/h; 12 mph) surfaced; 90 nmi (170 km; 100 mi) at 4 knots (7.4 km/h; 4.6 mph) submerged
- Test depth: 220 m (720 ft); Crush depth: 230–250 m (750–820 ft)
- Complement: 4 officers, 40–56 enlisted
- Sensors & processing systems: Gruppenhorchgerät
- Armament: 4 × 53.3 cm (21 in) torpedo tubes (four bow); 12 × torpedoes or 26 TMA mines; 1 × 8.8 cm (3.46 in) deck gun (220 rounds); 1 × 2 cm (0.79 in) C/30 anti-aircraft gun

Service record
- Part of: 1st U-boat Flotilla; 8 February – 31 December 1941; 23rd U-boat Flotilla; 1 January – 30 April 1942; 29th U-boat Flotilla; 1 May 1942 – 4 March 1943
- Identification codes: M 32 441
- Commanders: Oblt.z.S. / Kptlt. Hans-Werner Kraus; 8 February 1941 – 21 September 1942; Kptlt. Ulrich Wörisshoffer; 16 October 1942 – 4 March 1943
- Operations: 12 patrols: 1st patrol: 26 July – 9 September 1941; 2nd patrol: 28 September – 31 October 1941; 3rd patrol: 11 – 23 December 1941; 4th patrol: 25 – 30 December 1941; 5th patrol: 12 – 24 February 1942; 6th patrol: a. 10 – 21 March 1942; b. 24 – 28 March 1942; 7th patrol: 5 April – 30 May 1942; 8th patrol: 4 – 20 June 1942; 9th patrol: a. 6 – 20 August 1942; b. 31 August – 4 September 1942; 10th patrol: 21 November – 17 December 1942; 11th patrol: 12 – 31 January 1943; 12th patrol: 1 – 4 March 1943
- Victories: 5 merchant ships sunk (8,425 GRT); 1 auxiliary warship sunk (96 GRT); 1 merchant ship damaged (2,590 GRT); 1 auxiliary warship damaged (6,746 GRT)

German submarine U-83 was a Type VIIB U-boat of Nazi Germany's Kriegsmarine during World War II.

She was laid down in the Flender Werke at Lübeck as yard number 291 on 5 October 1939. Launched on 9 December 1940, she was commissioned on 8 February 1941. U-83 served with 1st U-boat Flotilla from 8 February 1941 to 31 December, with the 23rd flotilla from 1 January 1942 to 30 April and with the 29th flotilla from 1 March 1942 until she was sunk.

== Design ==
German Type VIIB submarines were preceded by the shorter Type VIIA submarines. U-83 had a displacement of 753 tonnes (741 long tons) when at the surface and 857 tonnes (843 long tons) while submerged. She had a total length of 66.50 m (218 ft 2 in), a pressure hull length of 48.80 m (160 ft 1 in), a beam of 6.20 m (20 ft 4 in), a height of 9.50 m (31 ft 2 in), and a draught of 4.74 m (15 ft 7 in). The submarine was powered by two Germaniawerft F46 four-stroke, six-cylinder supercharged diesel engines producing a total of 2,800 to 3,200 metric horsepower (2,060 to 2,350 kW; 2,760 to 3,160 shp) for use while surfaced, two AEG GU 460/8-276 double-acting electric motors producing a total of 750 metric horsepower (550 kW; 740 shp) for use while submerged. She had two shafts and two 1.23 m (4 ft) propellers. The boat was capable of operating at depths of up to 230 metres (750 ft).

The submarine had a maximum surface speed of 17.9 knots (33.2 km/h; 20.6 mph) and a maximum submerged speed of 8 knots (15 km/h; 9.2 mph). When submerged, the boat could operate for 90 nautical miles (170 km; 100 mi) at 4 knots (7.4 km/h; 4.6 mph); when surfaced, she could travel 8,700 nautical miles (16,100 km; 10,000 mi) at 10 knots (19 km/h; 12 mph). Differently from other VII B U-Boats, U-83 was fitted with only the front four 53.3 cm (21 in) torpedo tubes, and only twelve instead of 14 torpedoes, one 8.8 cm (3.46 in) SK C/35 naval gun, 220 rounds, and one 2 cm (0.79 in) anti-aircraft gun The boat had a complement of between forty-four and sixty.

== Service history ==
U-83 conducted twelve patrols and sank five ships totalling 8,425 gross register tons (GRT) and one auxiliary warship - the Q-ship HMS Farouk, of 96 GRT. She damaged one other ship of 2,590 GRT and damaged the fighter catapult ship HMS Ariguani, of 6,746 GRT.

U-83 was sunk on 4 March 1943 with all hands southeast of Cartagena in Spain in position 37°10′N 00°05′E, by three depth charges dropped from an RAF Hudson bomber (500 Squadron).

=== Wolfpacks ===
U-83 took part in three wolfpacks, namely:

- Bosemüller (28 August - 2 September 1941)
- Seewolf (2 – 7 September 1941)
- Breslau (2 – 29 October 1941)

== Summary of raiding history ==
Date	Ship	Nationality	Tonnage (Note: Merchant ship tonnages are in gross register tons. Military vessels are listed by tons displacement.)	Fate
12 October 1941	Corte Real	Portugal	2,044	Sunk
26 October 1941	HMS Ariguani	Royal Navy	6,746	Damaged
17 March 1942	Crista	United Kingdom	2,590	Damaged
8 June 1942	Esther	Palestine	100	Sunk
8 June 1942	Said	Egypt	231	Sunk
9 June 1942	Typhoon	Palestine	175	Sunk
13 June 1942	HMS Farouk	Royal Navy	96	Sunk
17 August 1942	Princess Marguerite	Canada	5,875	Sunk

== See also ==
- Mediterranean U-boat Campaign (World War II)

== Bibliography ==
- Bishop, Chris (2006). Kriegsmarine U-Boats, 1939–45. London: Amber Books. ISBN 978-1-904687-96-2.
- Busch, Rainer; Röll, Hans-Joachim (1999). German U-boat commanders of World War II: a biographical dictionary. Translated by Brooks, Geoffrey. London, Annapolis, Md: Greenhill Books, Naval Institute Press. ISBN 1-55750-186-6.
- Busch, Rainer; Röll, Hans-Joachim (1999). Der U-Boot-Krieg, 1939-1945: Deutsche U-Boot-Verluste von September 1939 bis Mai 1945 [German U-boat losses from September 1939 to May 1945] (in German). Vol. IV. Hamburg, Berlin, Bonn: Mittler. ISBN 3-8132-0514-2.
- Gröner, Eric; Jung, Dieter; Maass, Martin (1991). German Warships 1815-1945: U-boats and Mine Warfare Vessels. Vol. 2. Translated by Thomas, Keith; Magowan, Rachel. London: Conway Maritime Press. ISBN 0-85177-593-4.
- Kemp, Paul (1999). U-Boats Destroyed - German Submarine Losses in the World Wars. London: Arms & Armour. ISBN 1-85409-515-3.
