= Nagayev =

Nagayev or Nagaev (feminine: Nagayeva, Nagaeva) is a Russian-language family name, derived from the obsolete Russian ethnonym 'Nagay' for Nogais.

The surname may refer to:

- Alexey Nagayev (1704-1781), Russian hydrographer and admiral
- Igor Nagayev, a former Soviet canoeist
- Ivan Nagaev, an Uzbek footballer
- Ruslan Nagayev, a former football player
- Yepifan Nagayev, a Hero of the Soviet Union recipient
