= SS Johannes C Russ =

German cargo ship built in 1921

History
- Name: Johannes C Russ (1921–45); Empire Connaught (1945–46); Nemirovich Danchenko (1946–71)
- Owner: Schiffart-und Assekuranz Gesellschaft GmbH (1921–45); Ministry of War Transport (1945); Ministry of Transport (1945–46); Soviet Government (1946–71)
- Operator: Ernst Russ (1921–45); Ministry of War Transport (1945); Goole & Hull Steam Towing Co Ltd (1945–46); Soviet Government (1946–71)
- Port of registry: (Weimar Republic) Hamburg (1921–33); (Nazi Germany) Hamburg (1933–45); (United Kingdom) London (1945–46); Soviet Union (1946–71)
- Builder: Stettiner Oderwerke AG
- Launched: 1921
- Identification: Code Letters RBVJ (1921–34); Code Letters DHNG (1934–45); Code Letters GKST (1945–46); United Kingdom Official Number 180704 (1945–46)
- Fate: Scrapped

General characteristics
- Type: Cargo ship
- Tonnage: 998 GRT; 575 NRT
- Length: 210 ft 8 in (64.21 m)
- Beam: 33 ft 8 in (10.26 m)
- Depth: 13 ft 4 in (4.06 m)
- Installed power: Triple expansion steam engine
- Propulsion: Screw propeller

Johannes C Russ was a coaster that was built in 1921 by Stettiner Oderwerke AG, Stettin for German owners. In 1942 she was wrecked off Sweden but was salvaged and returned to service. She was seized by the Allies in May 1945 at Flensburg, passed to the Ministry of War Transport (MoWT) and renamed Empire Connaught. In 1946, she was allocated to the Soviet Government and renamed Nemirovich Danchenko. She served until 1971, when she was scrapped.

== Description ==
The ship was built in 1921 by Stettiner Oderwerke AG, Stettin.

The ship was 210 feet 8 inches (64.21 m) long, with a beam of 33 feet 8 inches (10.26 m). She had a depth of 13 feet 4 inches (4.06 m). The ship had a GRT of 998 and a NRT of 545.

The ship was propelled by a triple expansion steam engine, which had cylinders of 15 3/4 inches (40 cm), 25 1/4 inches (64 cm) and 41 3/16 inches (104.6 cm) diameter by 29 1/2 inches (75 cm) stroke. The engine was built by Stettiner Oderwerke.

== History ==
Johannes C Russ was built for Schiffart-und Assekuranz Gesellschaft GmbH. She was placed under the management of Ernst Russ, Hamburg. Her port of registry was Hamburg and the Code Letters RBVJ were allocated. In 1934, her Code letters were changed to DHNG. On 21 October 1941, Johannes C Russ was wrecked off Umeå, Sweden. She was later salvaged, repaired and returned to service.

Johannes C Russ was seized by the Allies in May 1945 at Flensburg. She was passed to the MoWT and renamed Empire Connaught. Her port of registry was changed to London. The Code Letters GKST and United Kingdom Official Number 180704 were allocated. In 1946, Empire Connaught was allocated to the Soviet Government and was renamed Nemirovich Danchenko. She served until she was scrapped in 1971.

=== Soviet Union period of this ship. ===
In winter 1947 the Soviet steamship Yakut was used in operations to tow the steamer Nemirovich Danchenko due to Nemirovich Danchenko already used mostly own coal during the voyage Panama - Kamchatka and lacked coal in Pacific Ocean to complete this voyage.

On 14 December 1947. The steamship Nemirovich Danchenko was without cargo and alongside the berth number 3 in Nagayev port. The ship loaded the coal in own hopper, the bunkering had place. On 19 December the ship still was alongside in Nagayev port, when two Soviet steamships General Vatutin; ex. Liberty class ship SS Jay Cooke) carrying 3,313 tonnes of Ammonal and TNT and Vyborg carrying 193 tonnes of chemistry substances exploded. Due to exploded ships had explosive cargo Nagayev settlement and port were in fire and partly ruined and other ships in the port including the steamship Nemirovich Danchenko were damaged more or less.
