= HMS Mallow (K81) =

Flower class corvette

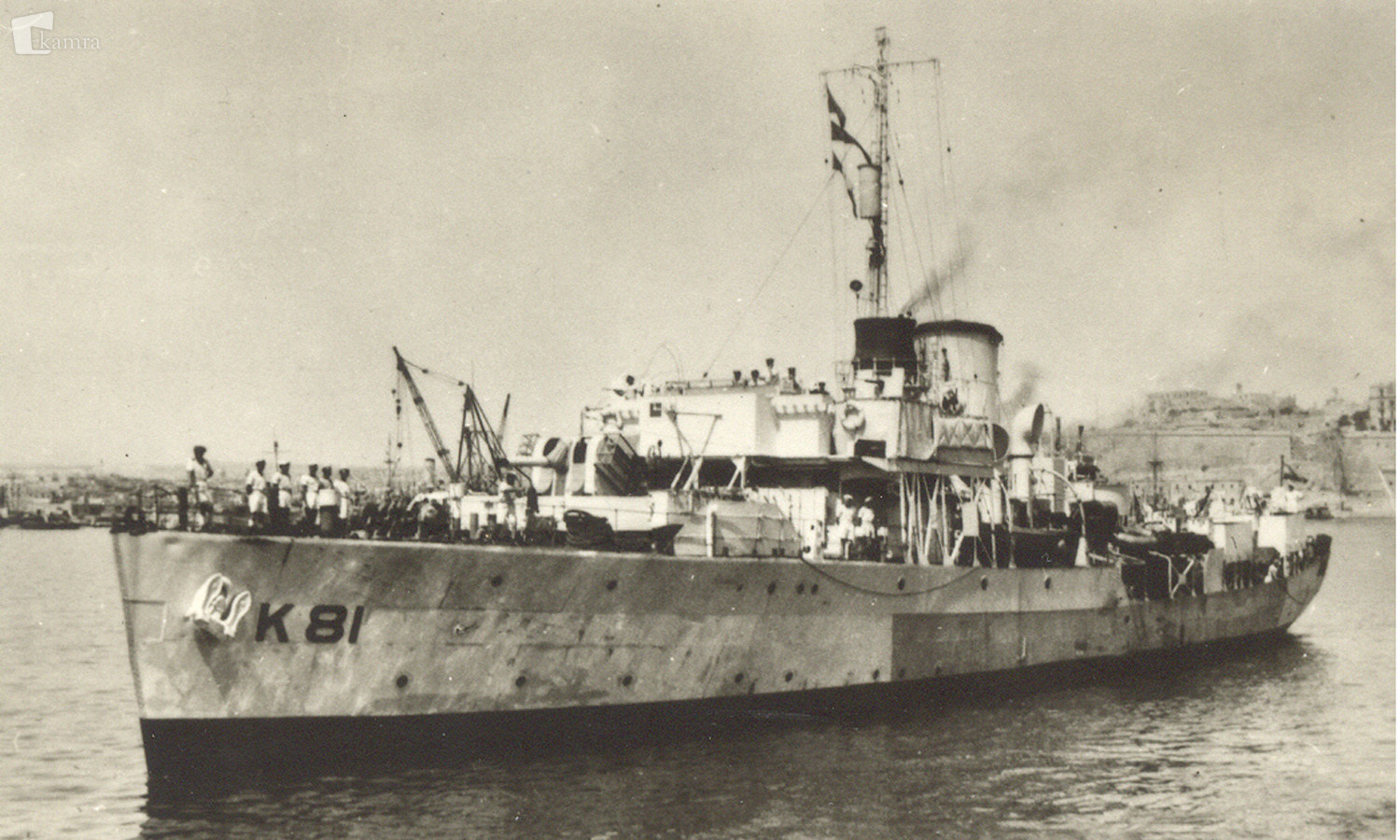
- HMS Mallow in January 1944

History

United Kingdom
- Name: HMS Mallow
- Ordered: 19 September 1939
- Builder: Harland and Wolff, Belfast, Northern Ireland
- Yard number: 1065
- Laid down: 14 November 1939
- Launched: 22 May 1940
- Commissioned: 2 July 1940
- Identification: Pennant number: K81
- Fate: Transferred to the Royal Yugoslav Navy on 11 January 1944

Yugoslavia
- Name: Nada
- Acquired: 11 January 1944
- Out of service: 1945

SFR Yugoslavia
- Name: Nada
- Acquired: 1945
- Renamed: Partizanka
- Fate: Returned to the Royal Navy in 1949

Egypt
- Name: El Sudan
- Acquired: 28 October 1949
- Decommissioned: 1975

General characteristics
- Class & type: Flower-class corvette
- Displacement: 940 long tons (960 t) (standard); 1,170 long tons (1,190 t) (deep load)
- Length: 205 ft (62.5 m) (oa)
- Beam: 33 ft (10.1 m)
- Draught: 7 ft 9 in (2.4 m)–14 ft 10 in (4.5 m)
- Installed power: 2,750 ihp (2,050 kW); 2 × cylindrical boilers
- Propulsion: 1 × shaft; 1 × 4-cylinder triple-expansion steam engine
- Speed: 16 kn (30 km/h; 18 mph)
- Range: 4,000 nmi (7,400 km; 4,600 mi) at 12 kn (22 km/h; 14 mph)
- Complement: 47
- Armament: 1 × 4 in (102 mm) Mk IX naval gun; 2 × twin Lewis 0.303-inch (7.7 mm) machine guns; 2 × depth charge throwers; 2 × depth charge rails; 25 × depth charges

HMS Mallow was a Flower-class corvette commissioned into the Royal Navy that served as a convoy escort during World War II; with the Royal Navy in 1940–1944, and with the Royal Yugoslav Navy-in-exile in 1944–1945. She was renamed Nada in Yugoslav service. Her main armament was a single 4-inch (102 mm) Mk IX naval gun, although a variety of secondary and anti-aircraft guns were added towards the end of the war. During the war, she escorted 80 convoys whilst in British service, sinking one German U-boat with the assistance of another ship, and escorted another 18 convoys whilst in Yugoslav service. After the war, she served in the fledgling navy of the new Federal People's Republic of Yugoslavia as Nada then Partizanka, before being returned to the Royal Navy in 1949. Later that year, she was purchased by the Egyptian Navy in which she served as El Sudan. She did not see any action in the various conflicts in which Egypt was involved, and was decommissioned in 1975.

== Background ==
In the 1930s, the Royal Navy (RN) realised that in the event of a major war it would have insufficient numbers of escort ships. In 1936, the Admiralty discussed meeting this need by building an escort using a whaling ship or fishing trawler design, but no decision was made. In February 1939 the concept was revisited by the Admiralty and six options were considered, one of which was a modified version of a whaler named Southern Pride which had been built by the Smith's Dock Company. Southern Pride displaced 700 long tons (710 t), could reach a top speed of 16 knots (30 km/h; 18 mph), and cost ₤75,000 to build, with a construction time of seven months. This was less expensive than all the other options except a modified trawler. The Director of Naval Design met with representatives of Smith's Dock Company and improvements on the design were quickly agreed. Within the RN it was considered that the whaler design was suitable, being faster than a trawler and needing a smaller crew than a purpose-built naval patrol vessel. By April the decision had been made to go ahead with the modified whaler as the basis for an anti-submarine warfare ship, but lengthened by 9.1 metres (30 ft). The specifications included a single 4-inch (102 mm) Mk IX naval gun and a Type 123 ASDIC sonar.

The design, which was known as the Flower class, was completed in mid-June, and because major shipyards were already committed to expanding the fleet, smaller commercial dockyards were employed to build the ships. As the ships of the class were built by different dockyards and lessons learned at sea during World War II were incorporated into the design as later orders were placed, there was an evolution of the class between 1939 and 1942 across the 269 corvettes built for the Allies. Almost all the ships of the class were built in the UK and Canada.

== Design ==
The original Flower-class design had an overall length of 205 feet (62.5 m), and length between perpendiculars of 190 feet (57.9 m), and a beam of 33 ft (10.1 m). They had a draught forward of 7 ft 9 in (2.36 m) and aft of 14 ft 10 in (4.52 m). While their standard displacement was 940 long tons (960 t), they displaced 1,170 long tons (1,190 t) at deep load. They had a crew of 47 men. They were powered using steam created by two cylindrical boilers, driving a single four-cylinder triple-expansion steam engine that generated 2,750 indicated horsepower (2,050 kW). The engine drove a single propeller and ships of the class could reach a top speed of 16 knots (30 km/h; 18 mph). They carried 200 long tons (200 t) of fuel oil, which gave them a range of 4,000 nautical miles (7,400 km; 4,600 mi) at 12 knots (22 km/h; 14 mph).

The ships were armed with a single 4-inch (102 mm) Mk IX naval gun, two Mark II depth charge throwers and two rails, and could carry 25 depth charges. Ships of the class were also initially equipped with two twin Lewis 0.303-inch (7.7 mm) machine guns, and later versions received one 2-pounder (40 mm [1.6 in]) "pom-pom" autocannon.

Later in the war, ships of the class received two additional depth charge throwers and their capacity was increased to 70 depth charges. The machine guns proved inadequate as anti-aircraft (AA) weapons, and were replaced by heavier guns. By 1944, Mallow's AA armament included six single 0.79 in (20 mm) Oerlikon cannons, and one 2-pounder "pom-pom". This was intended to better meet the higher air threat in the Mediterranean Sea. She was also equipped with rocket rails fitted to the gun shield of the 4-inch gun, a forward-firing anti-submarine Hedgehog fitted aft of the main gun, and had a Type 271 radar fitted on the rear of her bridge. By 1945, Mallow's armament had been further enhanced with two 6-pounder Hotchkiss guns. With all these additional weapon systems, by the end of the war her crew had swelled to 85.

The many major modifications to the class over time resulted in the development of the modified Flower class which were produced later in the war.

== Service history ==
Mallow was built by the firm of Harland and Wolff at Belfast, Northern Ireland, under yard number 1065, and was ordered on 19 September 1939, laid down on 14 November, launched on 22 May 1940, and commissioned on 2 July. She was allocated the pennant number K81, and her first captain was Lieutenant Commander W. B. Piggott of the Royal Navy Reserve.

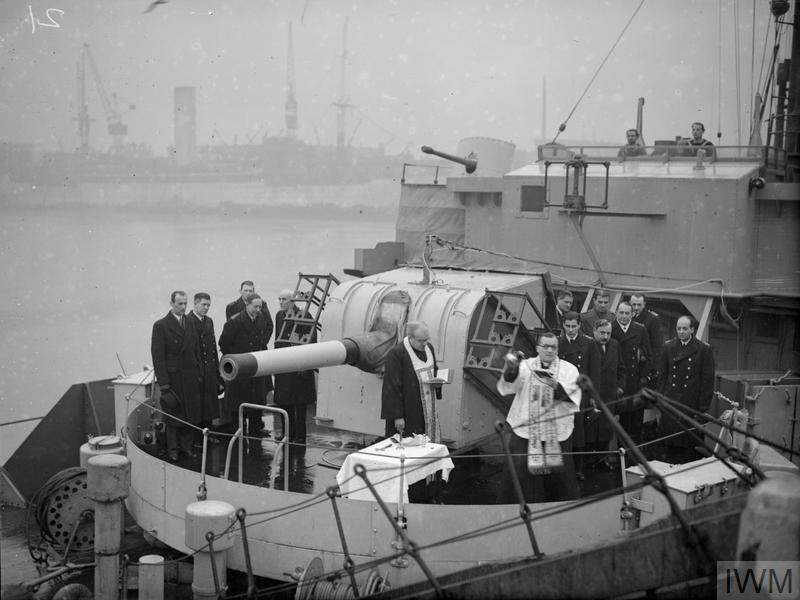
Prince Tomislav of Yugoslavia renaming the corvette Nada at Liverpool on 11 January 1944

Mallow was quickly put into service as a convoy escort from July 1940 onwards; her first convoy was OB 187 which departed Liverpool on 21 July. During the remainder of 1940 she was engaged as an escort for 24 convoys as they left from or arrived at Liverpool. During 1941, she escorted 22 convoys to and from Liverpool, as well as three that departed from Milford Haven in Wales. Lieutenant W. R. B. Noall of the Royal Navy Reserve took command of Mallow on 1 July 1941. In October she was serving with the 37th Escort Group based in Liverpool, along with two sloops and seven other corvettes. In mid-October, the group was assigned to escort Convoy HG 75 from Gibraltar to Liverpool; Mallow and the Shoreham-class sloop HMS Rochester participated in sweeps west of Gibraltar against the concentration of German U-boats awaiting the departure of the convoy, and together sank U-204 on the 19th. The convoy departed a week later than scheduled due to the submarine threat. On 26 October, Mallow assisted in driving away U-563 and U-564 from the same convoy. Noall was later made a Companion of the Distinguished Service Order for "skill and enterprise in dealing with submarines" whilst commanding Mallow.

During 1942, Mallow escorted 15 convoys, again mainly to and from Liverpool, and escorted the same number in 1943, remaining with the 37th Escort Group covering the UK–Mediterranean and UK–Sierra Leone convoy routes. Temporary Acting Lieutenant Commander H. T. S. Clouston of the Royal Navy Volunteer Reserve assumed command of Mallow on 10 May 1943. In December, Mallow was not listed as active on the Navy List.

In early 1944, Mallow was loaned to the Royal Yugoslav Navy-in-exile. She was renamed Nada ("Hope" in the Serbo-Croatian language) on 11 January. She sailed with a reduced crew in convoy OS 68/KMS 42 which departed Liverpool on 12 February and arrived at Gibraltar on 25 February. Nada commenced escort duties in May, conducting 17 convoy escorts between Gibraltar and Port Said, Egypt, to October. During her final escort of the year she was detached from convoy KMS 66 as her crew was not considered "politically reliable". This stemmed from the fact that they were not aligned with Josip Broz Tito's Partisan forces. She is recorded as participating in one escort in early February 1945. After the conclusion of the war, Nada was taken over by the fledgling Yugoslav Navy and renamed Partizanka. In 1949, the Royal Navy demanded her return and she reverted to HMS Mallow. The requirement to return Partizanka was a painful blow to the Yugoslavs, as she was one of few modern warships in service with them at the time.

On 28 October 1949, the Egyptian Navy purchased Mallow from the UK and she then served under the name El Sudan. This occurred in the immediate aftermath of the 1948 Arab–Israeli War, and was part of a significant fleet expansion. El Sudan survived the significant Egyptian naval losses during the 1956 Suez Crisis. Larger Egyptian surface units such as El Sudan were kept in port during the 1967 Six Day War with Israel, when motor torpedo boats did the bulk of the fighting. Around 1970, El Sudan was serving in a training role, and was one of the last ships of her class in use by the following year. She remained in service until being decommissioned in 1975, and sold for scrap.
