= HMS Ariguani =

British warship

History
- Name: Ariguani
- Operator: Elders & Fyffes Ltd.
- Port of registry: (United Kingdom) London
- Laid down: September 1925
- Launched: 20 October 1925
- Completed: February 1926
- In service: 1926
- Out of service: 1956
- Fate: Scrapped 1956

United Kingdom
- Name: Ariguani
- Acquired: September 1940
- Commissioned: March 1941
- Fate: Returned to previous owners

General characteristics as built
- Type: Cargo ship
- Tonnage: 5,746 GRT
- Length: 129.6 m (425 ft 2 in)
- Beam: 16.49 m (54 ft 1 in)
- Draught: 9.24 m (30 ft 4 in)
- Propulsion: 2 × 3 cyl. steam engines, 2 screws, 622 hp (464 kW)
- Speed: 14 knots (26 km/h; 16 mph)

HMS Ariguani, formerly SS Ariguani requisitioned and commissioned as an Ocean Boarding vessel and subsequently a fighter catapult ship (FCS) during World War II for the Royal Navy.

== Design ==
Ariguani was built by A. Stephen & Sons Ltd. at Lighthouse, Glasgow, Scotland. The keel was laid in September 1925; she was completed in February 1926, and originally meant to be a banana passenger boat designed for service between the Americas and the United Kingdom. She had an original gross register tonnage of 5,746 tons and measured 129.6 metres (425 ft 2 in) in length with a beam of 16.49 metres (54 ft 1 in). She had a draught of 9.24 metres (30 ft 4 in). Propulsion came from two triple-cylinder steam engines, driving two screws for 622 horsepower (464 kW). Her top speed was roughly 14 knots (26 km/h; 16 mph).

== Requisition ==
Between February 1926 and September 1940, the ship operated as civilian transport for Elder & Fyffes Ltd., based in London. Her primary cargo were bananas between the United Kingdom and the Caribbean.

The ship was requisition in September 1940 and commissioned into service in March 1941. She was converted to a fighter catapult ship (FCS). On 26 October 1941, at 03:54 while escorting Convoy HG 75, she was struck by a torpedo fired by the German submarine U-83 at a location roughly 600 miles (970 km) southwest of Portugal. The crew immediately abandoned ship but returned to her at dawn once they realized she was not going to flood and sink. She was towed to Gibraltar, arriving on 2 November She was repaired and returned to civilian service under her previous owners. She was sold for scrap in November 1956 and broken up at Briton Ferry, Wales.
