= HMS Tamarisk (K216) =

History

United Kingdom
- Name: Tamarisk
- Ordered: 24 October 1940
- Builder: Fleming and Ferguson, Northern Ireland
- Laid down: 10 February 1941
- Launched: 28 July 1941
- Commissioned: 26 December 1941
- Fate: Transferred to Greece

Greece
- Name: Tombazis
- Decommissioned: 1952
- Fate: Returned to UK, scrapped on 20 March 1952

General characteristics
- Class & type: Flower-class corvette
- Displacement: 940 t (930 long tons)
- Length: 62.48 m (205 ft 0 in)
- Beam: 10.06 m (33 ft 0 in)
- Draught: 3.51 m (11 ft 6 in)
- Installed power: 2,750 hp (2,050 kW)
- Propulsion: triple expansion steam engine
- Speed: 16 knots (30 km/h; 18 mph)
- Range: 3,500 nmi (6,500 km; 4,000 mi) at 12 knots (22 km/h; 14 mph)
- Endurance: fuel oil — 230 t (230 long tons; 250 short tons)
- Complement: 85

Tombazis (Greek: ΒΠ Τομπάζης) was a Greek corvette of the Flower class, originally the British HMS Tamarisk. It was one of four corvettes of this type transferred to Greece during World War II.

== Name ==
The ship was named after Iakovos Tombazis (Greek: Ιάκωβος Τομπάζης, 1782–1829), a merchant and shipowner, the first commander of the revolutionary fleet during the Greek War of Independence (1821–1829).

== Service ==
In November 1943, the command of the corvette was assumed by commander Georgios Panayotopoulos. Tombazis provided convoy escort in the Atlantic and participated in the Normandy landings alongside the Greek Flower-class corvette Kriezis. During the first 20 days of the landings, Tombazis escorted seven convoys from Portsmouth, England to Normandy.

From 25 June to 7 July 1944, Tombazis escorted seven convoys along the route from Wales to the Cornwall peninsula, and from then until 10 August, she escorted nine more convoys from Portsmouth to Normandy.

Tombazis also participated in landing operations in southern France.

In 1952, the ship was returned to the United Kingdom and scrapped in the same year.
