= List of ship launches in 1930 =

The list of ship launches in 1930 includes a chronological list of notable ships launched in 1930.

Date	Ship	Class	Builder	Location	Country	Notes
11 January	Belgia	Passenger ship	Öresundsvarvet	Landskrona	Sweden	For F Sternhagen – "Gotha Line"
17 January	Prince Henry	Cargo ship	Cammell Laird & Co. Ltd.	Birkenhead	United Kingdom	For Canadian National Steamship Company.
12 February	Folkestone	Hastings-class sloop	Swan, Hunter and Wigham Richardson Co Ltd	Wallsend	United Kingdom	For Royal Navy
14 January	William Wilberforce	Cargo ship	Harland & Wolff	Belfast	United Kingdom	For British & African Steamship Co.
28 January	Genova	Cargo ship	Harland & Wolff	Belfast	United Kingdom	For Argentine Navigation Co.
12 February	Baron Napier	Cargo ship	Harland & Wolff	Belfast	United Kingdom	For H. Hogarth & Sons.
18 February	Silvercypress	Cargo ship	Harland & Wolff	Belfast	United Kingdom	For Silver Line.
27 February	Edward Blyden	Cargo ship	Harland & Wolff	Belfast	United Kingdom	For British & African Steamship Co.
27 February	Macgregor Laird	Cargo ship	Harland & Wolff	Belfast	United Kingdom	For British & African Steamship Co.
1 March	Waimarino	Cargo ship	Ardrossan Dockyard Ltd	Ardrossan	United Kingdom	For Union Steamship Company of New Zealand Ltd. Wellington
4 March	Innisfallen	Ferry	Harland & Wolff	Belfast	United Kingdom	For City of Cork Steam Packet Co.
5 March	Celedonia	Lighter	Harland & Wolff	Belfast	United Kingdom	For Argentine Navigatio Co.
14 March	Scarborough	Hastings-class sloop	Swan, Hunter & Wigham Richardson Ltd	Wallsend	United Kingdom	For Royal Navy
17 March	Baron Erskine	Cargo ship	Harland & Wolff	Belfast	United Kingdom	For H. Hogarth & Sons.
18 March	Acheron	A-class destroyer	John I. Thornycroft & Company	Woolston, Hampshire	United Kingdom	For Royal Navy
19 March	Aras	Yacht	Bath Iron Works	Bath, Maine	United States	
March	Santa Clara	Passenger ship	New York Shipbuilding Corporation	New York City	United States	For Grace Steamship Company
10 April	Chicago	Northampton-class cruiser	Mare Island Naval Shipyard	Vallejo, California	United States	For United States Navy
10 April	Hastings	Hastings-class sloop	Devonport Dockyard	Plymouth	United Kingdom	For Royal Navy
10 April	Penzance	Hastings-class sloop	Devonport Dockyard	Plymouth	United Kingdom	For Royal Navy
10 April	Schürbek	Cargo ship	Flensburger Schiffbau-Gesellschaft	Flensburg	Germany	For Knöhr & Burchardt .
12 April	Phénix	Redoutable-class submarine	Chantiers Dubigeon	Nantes	France	For French Navy
15 April	Atheltemplar	Tanker	Lithgows	Port Glasgow	United Kingdom	For United Molasses Co Ltd
15 April	Silverwalnut	Cargo ship	Harland & Wolff	Belfast	United Kingdom	For Silver Line.
27 April	Alberto di Giussano	Condottieri-class cruiser			Italy	For Regia Marina
27 April	Zara	Zara-class cruiser	O.T.O.	La Spezia	Italy	For Regia Marina
28 April	Prestatyn Rose	Cargo ship	Harland & Wolff	Belfast	United Kingdom	For Richard Hughes & Co.
29 April	Alfred Jones	Cargo ship	Harland & Wolff	Belfast	United Kingdom	For British & African Steamship Co.
29 April	Warwick Castle	Passenger ship	Harland & Wolff	Belfast	United Kingdom	For Union-Castle Line.
8 May	Hamburgo	Cargo ship	Harland & Wolff	Belfast	United Kingdom	For Argentine Navigation Co.
12 May	Anglesea Rose	Cargo ship	Harland & Wolff	Belfast	United Kingdom	For Richard Hughes & Co.
12 May	Takao	Takao-class cruiser	Yokosuka Naval Arsenal	Yokosuka	Japan	For Imperial Japanese Navy
12 May	Yūgiri	Fubuki-class destroyer	Maizuru Naval Arsenal	Maizuru, Kyoto	Japan	For Imperial Japanese Navy
12 May	Hindustan	Hastings-class sloop	Swan Hunter	Wallsend	United Kingdom	For Royal Indian Marine
15 May	Oriente	Ocean liner	Newport News Shipbuilding	Newport News, Virginia	United States	For New York and Cuba Mail and Steamship Co
27 May	Ebano	Asphalt carrier	Harland & Wolff	Belfast	United Kingdom	For Ebano Oil Co.
28 May	Achille	Redoutable-class submarine	Arsenal de Brest	Brest	France	For French Navy
29 May	Blanche	B-class destroyer	Hawthorn Leslie	Hebburn	United Kingdom	
29 May	Silverteak	Cargo ship	Harland & Wolff	Belfast	United Kingdom	For Silver Line.
30 May	Medoc	Cargo ship	Harland & Wolff	Belfast	United Kingdom	For Worms & Cie.
5 June	Edenhurst	cargo ship	Furness Shipbuilding	Haverton Hill-on-Tees	United Kingdom	For Hartlepool Steamship Co
10 June	Brightside	Coaster	Isaac J. Abdela & Mitchell (1925) Ltd.	Queensferry	United Kingdom	For Eltham Shipping Co. Ltd.
12 June	Foylebank	Cargo ship	Harland and Wolff	Belfast	United Kingdom	For Bank Line.
12 June	Pomerol	Cargo ship	Harland & Wolff	Belfast	United Kingdom	For Worms & Cie.
16 June	Atago	Takao-class cruiser	Yokosuka Naval Arsenal	Yokosuka	Japan	For Imperial Japanese Navy
26 June	Guayra	Ferry	Harland & Wolff	Belfast	United Kingdom	For Argentine Navigation Co.
26 June	Silversandal	Cargo ship	Harland & Wolff	Belfast	United Kingdom	For Silver Line.
28 June	Pégase	Redoutable-class submarine	Ateliers et Chantiers de la Loire	Saint-Nazaire	France	For French Navy
30 June	Ciudad de Corrientes	Cargo ship	Harland & Wolff	Belfast	United Kingdom	For Argentine Navigation Co.
June	Jakob Goldschmidt	Fishing trawler	Schiffswerft von Henry Koch AG	Lübeck	Germany	For Hochseefischerei J. Wieting AG
1 July	San Antonio	Cargo ship	Harland & Wolff	Belfast	United Kingdom	For Compagnie Générale Transatlantique.
2 July	Saukko	Submarine	Sandvikens Skeppsdocka och Mekaniska Verkstad	Helsinki	Finland	For Suomen Merivoimat
10 July	Chateau Larose	Cargo ship	Harland & Wolff	Belfast	United Kingdom	For Worms & Cie.
10 July	Keith	B-class destroyer flotilla leader	Vickers Armstrong	Barrow-in-Furness	United Kingdom	
10 July	Laganbank	Cargo ship	Harland & Wolff	Belfast	United Kingdom	For Bank Line.
11 July	Saguenay	River-class destroyer	John I. Thornycroft & Company	Woolston, Hampshire	Canada	For Royal Canadian Navy
18 July	Boreas	B-class destroyer	Palmer's	Jarrow	United Kingdom	
25 July	Brazen	B-class destroyer	Palmer's	Hebburn	United Kingdom	
26 July	Wilfred	Cargo schooner	Nobiskrug	Rendsburg	Germany	
30 July	Svana	Trawler	Smiths Dock Co Ltd	Middlesbrough	United Kingdom	For Christian Salvesen & Co Ltd
6 August	Basilisk	B-class destroyer	John Brown & Company	Clydebank	United Kingdom	For Royal Navy
11 August	Chateau Pavie	Cargo ship	Harland & Wolff	Belfast	United Kingdom	For Worms & Cie.
14 August	San Diego	Cargo ship	Harland & Wolff	Belfast	United Kingdom	For Compagnie Générale Transatlantique.
23 August	Alberico da Barbiano	Condottieri-class cruiser			Italy	For Regia Marina
23 August	Firefly	Trawler	Cook, Welton & Gemmell	Beverley	United Kingdom	For St Andrews Steam Fishing Co Ltd
26 August	Athelfoam	Tanker molasses	Cammell Laird	Birkenhead	United Kingdom	For United Molasses Co. Ltd. Liverpool
26 August	Ganges	Cargo ship	Harland & Wolff	Belfast	United Kingdom	For Nourse Line.
1 September	Louisville	Northampton-class cruiser	Puget Sound Navy Yard	Bremerton, Washington	United States	For United States Navy
6 September	Archimède	Redoutable-class submarine	Chantiers Navals Français	Blainville-sur-Orne, Caen	France	For French Navy
11 September	San Francisco	Cargo ship	Harland & Wolff	Belfast	United Kingdom	For Compagnie Générale Transatlantique.
17 September	Monte Pascoal	Monte-class ocean liner	Blohm & Voss	Hamburg	Germany	For Hamburg-Südamerikanische Dampfschifffahrts-Gesellschaft
23 September	Boadicea	B-class destroyer	Hawthorn Leslie	Hebburn	United Kingdom	
23 September	Reina del Pacifico	Passenger ship	Harland & Wolff	Belfast	United Kingdom	For Pacific Steam Navigation Company.
24 September	Athelbeach	Tanker molasses	Cammell Laird	Birkenhead	United Kingdom	For United Molasses Co. Ltd. Liverpool
25 September	Maurice Rose	Cargo ship	Harland & Wolff	Belfast	United Kingdom	For Richard Hughes & Co.
29 September	Beagle	B-class destroyer	John Brown & Company	Clydebank	United Kingdom	
9 October	Brilliant	B-class destroyer	Swan Hunter	Tyne and Wear	United Kingdom	
9 October	Dupleix	Suffren-class cruiser	Arsenal de Brest	Brest	France	For Marine Nationale
9 October	Somali	Cargo ship	Harland & Wolff	Belfast	United Kingdom	For Hain Shipping Co.
10 October	Skeena	River-class destroyer (1931)	John I. Thornycroft & Company	Woolston, Hampshire	Canada	For Royal Canadian Navy
14 October	Dennis Rose	Cargo ship	Harland & Wolff	Belfast	United Kingdom	For Richard Hughes & Co.
18 October	Trudione	Yacht	Bath Iron Works	Bath, Maine	United States	
22 October	Cuidad de Concepcion	Ferry	Harland & Wolff	Belfast	United Kingdom	For Argentine Navigation Co.
23 October	San Jose	Cargo ship	Harland & Wolff	Belfast	United Kingdom	For Compagnie Générale Transatlantique.
4 November	Fowey	Shoreham-class sloop	Devonport Dockyard	Plymouth	United Kingdom	For Royal Navy
6 November	Georges Philippar	Ocean liner	Ateliers et Chantiers de la Loire	St Nazaire	France	For Compagnie des Messageries Maritimes
8 November	Oboro	Fubuki-class destroyer	Sasebo Naval Arsenal	Sasebo, Nagasaki	Japan	For Imperial Japanese Navy
20 November	San Mateo	Cargo ship	Harland & Wolff	Belfast	United Kingdom	For Compagnie Générale Transatlantique.
22 November	Shoreham	Shoreham-class sloop	Chatham Dockyard	Chatham	United Kingdom	For Royal Navy
4 December	Monte Rosa	Monte-class ocean liner	Blohm & Voss	Hamburg	Germany	For Hamburg-Südamerikanische Dampfschifffahrts-Gesellschaft.
6 December	Bulldog	B-class destroyer	Swan, Hunter & Wigham Richardson Ltd	Wallsend	United Kingdom	For Royal Navy
19 December	Ajax	cargo ship	Scotts Shipbuilding and Engineering Company Limited	Greenock	United Kingdom	For Ocean Steamship Co. Ltd
10 December	Rockabill	Coaster	Harland & Wolff	Belfast	United Kingdom	For Clyde Shipping Co.
20 December	San Pedro	Cargo ship	Harland & Wolff	Belfast	United Kingdom	For Compagnie Générale Transatlantique.
Date unknown	Adele Traber	Cargo ship	Flensburger Schiff- Gesellschaft.	Flensburg	Germany	For W. Traber & Co.
Date unknown	Armina	Yacht	Mathis Yacht Building Company	Camden, New Jersey	United States	
Date unknown	August Wriedt	Fishing trawler	Schiffswerft J. Frerichs & Co	Einswarden	Germany	For Nordsee Deutsche Hochseefisherei
Unknown date	Benlawers	Cargo ship	Charles Connell & Co Ltd	Glasgow	United Kingdom	For Ben Line.
Date unknown	Elda	Yacht	Consolidated Shipbuilding Corp	New York City	United States	
Date unknown	Elsa Essberger	Tanker	Deutsche Werft.	Hamburg	Germany	For J. T. Essberger.
Date unknown	Etak	Schooner	Friedrich Krupp Germaniawerft	Kiel	Germany	
Date unknown	Fritz Homann	Fishing trawler	Deutsche Schiff- und Maschinenbau	Wesermünde	Germany	For Grundmann & Gröschel
Date unknown	Gorizia	Zara-class cruiser			Italy	For Regia Marina
Date unknown	Harmonic	Cargo ship	Shipbuilding Corporation Ltd.	Sunderland	United Kingdom	For J. & C. Harrison.
Date unknown	Harmattan	Cargo ship	Shipbuilding Corporation Ltd.	Sunderland	United Kingdom	For J. & C. Harrison.
Date unknown	Harpenden	Cargo ship	Bartram & Sons Ltd.	Sunderland	United Kingdom	For National Steamship Co.
Date unknown	Hinrich Freese	Fishing trawler	Deutsche Schiff- und Maschinenbau	Wesermünde	Germany	For Hanseatische Hochseefisherei AG
Date unknown	Katoura	Yacht	Herreshoff Manufacturing Co	Bristol, Rhode Island	United States	
Date unknown	Lipari	Cargo ship	Flensburger Schiff- Gesellschaft.	Flensburg	Germany	For R. M. Sloman.
Date unknown	Margariti	Cargo ship	Northumberland Shipbuilding Company	Howdon	United Kingdom	For Constantine Group
Date unknown	Miss England II	Racing monohull hydroplane	Saunders-Roe	Cowes	United Kingdom	For Kaye Don
Date unknown	Neumark	Cargo ship	Howaldtswerke	Kiel	Germany	For Hamburg Amerikanische Packetfahrt Actien Gesellschaft
Date unknown	Prince David	ocean liner	Cammell Laird	Birkenhead	Canada	For Canadian National Railway
Date unknown	Rietbok'	Dredger	William Simons & Co. Ltd.	Greenock	United Kingdom	For South African Railways.
Date unknown	Sebago	Banff-class sloop	General Engineering and Dry Dock		United States Navy	For United States Navy
Date unknown	Skolpenbank	Fishing trawler	Deutsche Schiff- und Maschinenbau	Bremen	Germany	For private owner
Date unknown	Stakesby	Cargo ship	William Pickersgill & Sons Ltd	Sunderland, Co Durham	United Kingdom	For Rowland & Marwood Steamship Co Ltd
Date unknown	Suderøy V	Whaler		Oslo	Norway	
Date unknown	Tafelberg	Tanker	Armstrong, Whitworth & Co. Ltd.	Newcastle upon Tyne	United Kingdom	For Kerguelen Sealing & Whaling Co.
Date unknown	Veedol II	Tanker			United States	For Tidewater Oil Co
Date unknown	Vindicator	Purse seiner	Al Larson	Los Angeles	United States	
Date unknown	Zaca	Yacht	Nunes Brothers	Sausalito	United States	
