= Flying A =

Flying A may refer to:

- Flying A, a brand of Tidewater Oil Company
- American Film Manufacturing Company known as the Flying A Studios, an American motion picture studio
- Johnny Abarrientos Filipino retired professional basketball player known as The Flying A
