= Arjowiggins =

Paper manufacturer based in the UK

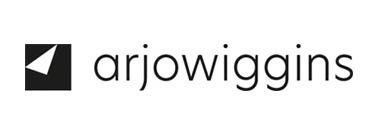
- Company type: Private
- Industry: Paper
- Founded: 1761; 265 years ago
- Headquarters: Scotland, United Kingdom
- Parent: Fedrigoni
- Footnotes / references Company website was removed with the completion of the acquisition by Fedrigoni.

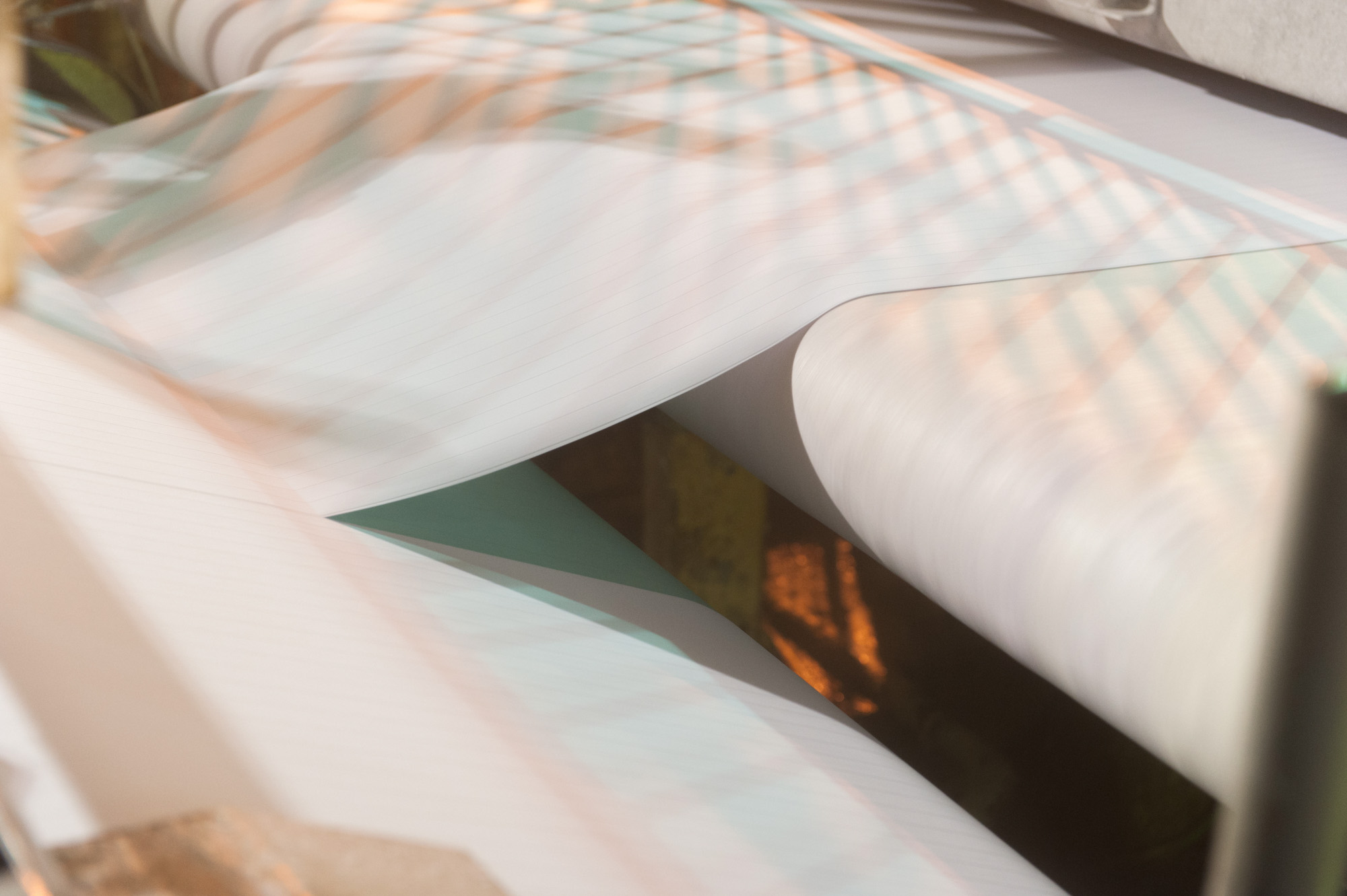
Paper production at Stoneywood Mill, Scotland

Arjowiggins was an independent paper manufacturer which at one time had mills in England, Scotland, France and the US. The company was liquidated in 2019, and several brands were acquired by Fedrigoni and Antalis among others.

== History ==
The company's origins go back to 1761 when Buckland Mill in Dover in Kent commenced operations.

Meanwhile, in France, in the middle of the 20th century there were four competing paper mills that manufactured sophisticated paper products with high added value, especially security papers (banknotes, passports, etc.). A joint merger plan was drawn up in 1954 and led to the formation of the first French paper-manufacturing group: Arjomari. The name of the group came from the first two letters of the names of the paper mills participating in the merger: Arches, Johannot, Marais, Rives.

In 1890, Buckland Mill was bought by Wiggins Teape, a paper milling business formed some 40 years earlier by Edward Wiggins and Henry Teape.

In 1970, the company was acquired by BAT Industries, who went on to acquire Appleton Papers of the US in 1978. The business expanded rapidly in the 1980s as it exploited the market in carbonless paper. In 1989 the UK and US paper businesses were demerged from BAT Industries and integrated to form Wiggins Teape Appleton.

In 1990, it acquired the Catalan paper company Guarro, one of the oldest in the world, founded in 1698 and established in the town of Gelida. In 1991 it merged with Arjomari-Prioux of France to form Arjowiggins Appleton. Its distribution business was demerged in 2000 as Antalis.

It was acquired by Worms & Cie in 2000. Worms & Cie evolved to become Sequana Capital but was placed in liquidation in 2019. A management buyout of the Arjowiggins business in the UK by managing director Jonathan Mitchell, securing 500 jobs in Stoneywood and Chartham, was completed in September 2019. A second phase of the management buyout of the Arjowiggins overseas business, securing 300 jobs in Gelida in Spain and Quzhou in China, was completed in October 2019.

In October 2022 the company went into administration, followed by closure in November 2022. The Chartham and Stoneywood Mills were offered for redevelopment. Arjowiggins China was acquired by Fedrigoni in 2023.

== Operations ==
The company produced papers for various purposes including graphic design, packaging and labeling and security printing at Stoneywood and Chartham mills in the UK, in Gelida in Spain and in Quzhou in China.
