= Guyandot =

Guyandot or Guyandotte are alternate spellings of Wyandot, a group of native North Americans also known as the Hurons.

Guyandot or Guyandotte may also refer to:

- USS Guyandot (AOG-16)
- Guyandotte, Huntington, West Virginia
- Guyandotte River in West Virginia
