= SS Samuel Q. Brown =

Steam tanker

Coordinates: 20°15′N 84°38′W

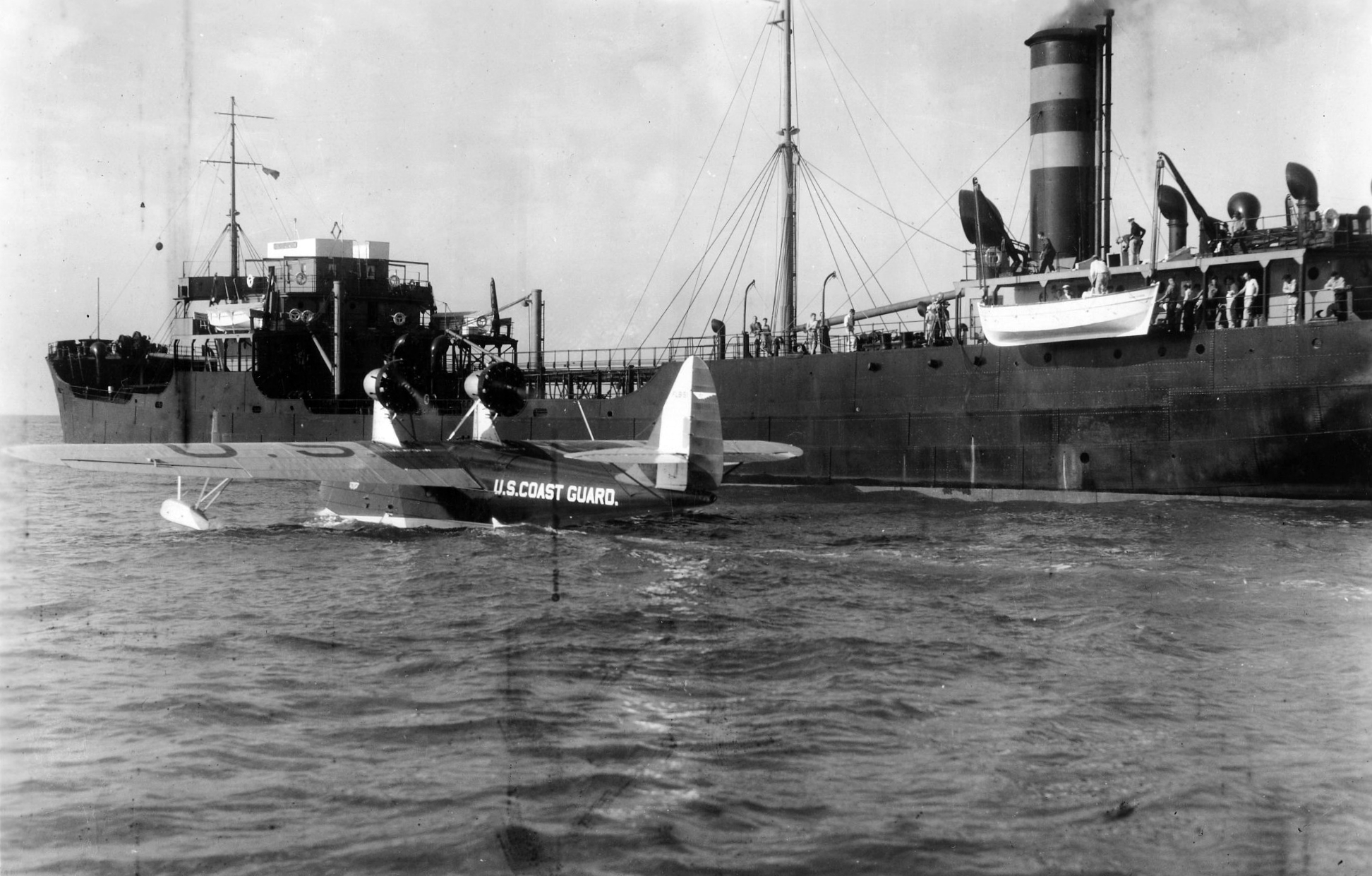
- US Coast Guard PJ-1 evacuating two injured crewmen from SS Samuel Q. Brown, June 1932.

History

United States
- Name: Samuel Q. Brown
- Namesake: Samuel Q. Brown
- Owner: Tide Water Oil Co.
- Builder: Merchant Shipbuilding Corp., Chester
- Yard number: 384
- Laid down: 1 October 1920
- Launched: 15 October 1921
- Sponsored by: Miss Louise Van Voorhees
- Completed: 5 November 1921
- Commissioned: 5 November 1921
- Maiden voyage: 5 November 1921
- Home port: New York (1922–1933); Wilmington (1934–1942)
- Identification: US Official Number 221721; Code letters MDGT (1926–1933); Call sign KDVO (1934–1942)
- Fate: Sunk, 23 May 1942

General characteristics
- Type: Tanker
- Tonnage: 6,624 GRT; 4,117 NRT; 11,260 DWT
- Length: 424.4 ft (129.4 m)
- Beam: 58.2 ft (17.7 m)
- Depth: 32.9 ft (10.0 m)
- Installed power: 584 Nhp, 3,000 ihp
- Propulsion: New York Shipbuilding Co. 3-cylinder triple expansion
- Speed: 10 1/2 knots (12.1 mph; 19.4 km/h)
- Armament: During WWII; 1 × 4 in (102 mm) naval gun; 4 × 20mm anti-aircraft guns; 2 × .30 cal (7.62 mm) machine guns

Samuel Q. Brown was a steam tanker built in 1920–1921 by Merchant Shipbuilding Corporation of Chester for Tide Water Oil Co., a subsidiary of Standard Oil, with intention of operating between New York and the oil-producing ports of the southern United States and Mexico.

== Design and construction ==
Early in 1920 Tide Water Oil Co. decided to add several modern tankers to expand their fleet of four vessels operating between the southern oil ports and New York and New Jersey. A contract for two of them, of approximately 10,000 deadweight tonnage, was awarded to the Merchant Shipbuilding Corp. and the ship was laid down at the shipbuilder's yard in Chester (yard number 384) on 1 October 1920, and launched on 15 October 1921, with Miss Louise Van Voorhees of New York, granddaughter of late Samuel Queen Brown, serving as the sponsor. The ship was named after Samuel Queen Brown, one of the founders of Tide Water Pipe Co. and former president of the Chester Oil Company. The tanker was built on the Isherwood principle of longitudinal framing providing extra strength to the body of the vessel, had two main decks and a shelter deck. Samuel Q. Brown had electric lights installed along the decks, and was also equipped with wireless of De Forest type.

As built, the ship was 424.4 feet (129.4 m) long (between perpendiculars) and 58.2 feet (17.7 m) abeam, and had a depth of 32.9 feet (10.0 m). Samuel Q. Brown was assessed at 6,624 GRT and 4,117 NRT and had deadweight tonnage of approximately 11,260. The vessel had a steel hull with double bottom, and a single 584 Nhp oil-burning triple expansion steam engine, with cylinders of 27-inch (69 cm), 45-inch (110 cm) and 75-inch (190 cm) diameter with a 51-inch (130 cm) stroke, that drove a single screw propeller and moved the ship at up to 10 1/2 knots (12.1 mph; 19.4 km/h).

Following the delivery of the vessel on 5 November 1921, the tanker immediately departed for her six-hour long trial trip, during which the steamer performed satisfactorily. Upon completion, she immediately sailed out on her maiden voyage to Palo Blanco to load a cargo of oil.

== Operational history ==
After completion of sea trials the tanker was transferred to her owners and departed for her maiden trip on the same day to Palo Blanco, one of a few large oil storage facility on the Mexican Gulf coast, near Tamiahua. Samuel Q. Brown continued carrying crude oil between the Mexican ports of Puerto Lobos, Tuxpan and Tampico and New York through the end of September 1922. Following a decline in the production of Mexican oilfields around that time, the tanker along with many other vessels, was rerouted to carry oil from Californian oilfields instead. The tanker passed through the Panama Canal on November 8 on her first trip to San Pedro and again on her return journey on December 3 with 10,000 tons of oil destined for New York. The tanker continued sailing on the California to New York route through mid 1928. For example, she made eight round-trip journeys between August 1924 and July 1925 season each time carrying approximately 10,000 tons of crude oil on her eastward trips. From July 1928 through October 1929 she was put on the Gulf coast to New York route, carrying oil from Humble Oil and Magnolia Petroleum Company facilities at Beaumont to New York and New Jersey. During the rest of 1929 the tanker made two trips from the West coast transporting gasoline from California to New York and Baltimore, before returning to carrying oil from the Gulf ports in early April 1930.

From April 1930 and onward Samuel Q. Brown was mainly involved in transportation of crude oil from the terminals of Magnolia Petroleum Company in Beaumont and Sinclair Oil Corporation and Texas Company in Port Arthur to the refineries in the Northeast ports of New York and Philadelphia, including Tidewater Oil own refinery in Bayonne. The vessel continued serving that route, as well as transporting crude and fuel oil from Houston to the ports of the Northeast through the end of 1936. Starting with late 1936 the tanker shifted her operations and started carrying oil from the Magnolia Petroleum Company terminal at the Louisiana port of Lake Charles in addition to occasional trips to Beaumont and Port Arthur facilities.

During her career the vessel came to the rescue on several occasions. In April 1931 the tanker saved three passengers from a disabled motorboat who were drifting for 13 days without much food or water after their vessel broke down on their trip from Bimini to Miami.

On 28 September 1940 Samuel Q. Brown came to the aid of sinking wooden-hulled steamship Alice Tebb after her seams came undone in rough weather off Georgia coast, about 100 miles northeast of Jacksonville. The tanker was joined in the rescue operation by cutter Tallapoosa who gave medical aid to schooner's chief engineer who suffered broken leg and internal injuries during the rescue. The entire 33-men crew was safely landed at Bayonne on October 3 after battling through heavy seas on their way north.

=== Sinking ===
Samuel Q. Brown left New Orleans for Honolulu in the morning of May 20, 1942 transporting approximately 80,000 barrels of Navy No.6 fuel oil. The vessel was under command of captain Aksel Andersen and had a crew of eight officers and thirty-one men in addition to sixteen Naval guards. During the day of May 22 the tanker, while travelling through the Yucatán Channel, maintained a zigzagging course but with the onset of darkness discontinued her evasive maneuvers. At approximately 01:39 on May 23 the ship was spotted by U-103 who started shadowing the ship until 04:02 when a spread of two torpedoes was fired by the submarine with both of them missing the ship. U-103 continued following the tanker, and launched another attack at 09:26, about 100 miles south of Cape Corrientes. Samuel Q. Brown was hit by a single torpedo on her port side, between the #9 main hold and the after fuel tanks. The resulting explosion killed two crew members, and set the vessel on fire immediately, destroying the main mast and the antenna, preventing her radio operator from sending a distress call. The engines were reversed but the fire spread very quickly, forcing the captain to order everyone to abandon ship. Two lifeboats and two rafts were launched but due to the speed with which the fire spread, the entire crew was forced to jump overboard. The U-boat surfaced about twenty minutes later and questioned the crew before delivering a coup de grâce to the ship at 10:35 and leaving the area. Later in the day on May 23 the two lifeboats were spotted by a patrol plane from the Upham Naval Air Station, who took five injured men on board and brought them to a hospital at Key West. The next day, the remainder of the crew was picked up by destroyer Goff and transported to Cristóbal. Despite two torpedo hits, Samuel Q. Brown continued floating and burning until she was scuttled by gun fire from Goff at 21:20 on May 24.
