= SS Margariti =

Lebanese cargo ship (1931–1967)

History

United Kingdom
- Name: Theron
- Owner: Constantine Group, Middlesbrough
- Builder: Northumberland Shipbuilding Company, Howdon
- Launched: 1930

History

United Kingdom
- Name: Harrow
- Owner: Galbraith, Pembroke & Co. Ltd., London
- Acquired: 1946

History

Sweden
- Name: Carita
- Owner: Manne J. E., Gothenburg
- Acquired: 1957

History

Lebanon
- Name: Margariti
- Owner: Sigalas & Platis Bros., Piraeus (Greece)
- Acquired: 1962
- Home port: Beirut (Lebanon)
- Fate: Sunk on 18 October 1967 near Vlieland, the Netherlands

General characteristics
- Tonnage: 4597 GRT
- Length: 120.5 m (395.3 ft)
- Beam: 15.9 m (52.2 ft)
- Draught: 8.1 m (26.6 ft)
- Installed power: 3600 hp
- Propulsion: 1x 3 cylinder triple expansion steam engine; single shaft; 1 screw
- Speed: 10.5 knots (19.4 km/h)
- Crew: 22

SS Margariti, originally named SS Wearwood and later also SS Carita and SS Harrow, was a 1930 British built cargo ship of the Constantine Group. It was later owned by British Galbraith, Pembroke & Co., Swedish Manne J. E. and from 1962 by Greek Sigalas & Platis Bros under Lebanese flag. On 18 October 1967 while en route from Gdańsk, Poland to Tartous the ship sank near Ameland, the Netherlands, after the ship tilted due to shifting cargo during a gale. All 24 people on board were rescued.

== Ship details ==
The steel ship measured 120.5 metres (395 ft 4 in) x 15.9 m (52.2 ft) x 8.1 m (26.6 ft). She had a tonnage of 4597 GRT. She was propulsed a 3 cylinder triple expansion steam engine of George Clark & NEM, having a single shaft and one screw. with a total of 432 hp. She had a speed of 10.5 knots (19.4 km/h). She had yard number 412 a had originally IMO number 160727 that changed in 1957 into 9173 and from 1962 in 5221910.

== History ==
The ship SS Theron was built in 1930 by Northumberland Shipbuilding Company in Howdon, United Kingdom for Constantine Group, Middlesbrough. In 1946 the ship was acquired by British company Galbraith, Pembroke & Co. Ltd., London and renamed her SS Harrow. They owned the ship until 1950. In 1957 the ship became property of Swedish Manne J. E. in Gothenburg and renamed the ship SS Harrow. In 1962 the ship was bought by Greek Sigalas & Platis Bros. of Piraeus and changed the name into SS Margariti. While being property of a Greek company, the ship was sailing under Lebanese flag having home port Beirut.

=== Fate ===
In October 1967 she was en route from Szczecin, Germany to Alexandria, Egypt with a cargo of fertilizer. On board were 24 people: 19 Greek people (including the 44 years old captain Bertos Grekos, his 22 years old wife and their 16 months sun Apostolos), two people from Arabia, two from Egypt and one from Austria.

After the ship passing near Texel lightship Texel there was a south-westen gale with windforce of 8 to 9 of the Beaufort scale. The captain decided to sail the ship for the sea and again passed lightship Texel. The rudder broke and the ship became unmanageable. An attempt to make an emergency rudder failed. Both anchors of the ship were dropped, but due to the gale they didn't hold. At 7:30pm, Scheveningen Radio was called for tug assistance. Tubgoat Holland and lifeboat Carlot from Terschelling went to the ship. Holland attempted to make a towing connection. After an initial failed attempt, the tug withdrew, causing anger with the crew of Margariti. The ship meanwhile drifted towards the coast of Vlieland. Closer to the coast it became shallower and the anchors of Margariti were gaining traction. After the ship started bumping, the crew wanted to disembark. However, due to the shallow water the rescuers couldn't get close to the Margariti.

At around 3am lifeboat Prins Hendrik from Den Helder arrived schipper Piet Bot managed to come alongside. He managed to save most of the passengers by letting them jump into the jumping net. After the stern of the ship started breaking and the lights went out there were still some people on board. The son was successfully thrown into the net and the other also rescued at the last moment by the Prins Hendrik. Shortly after the ship sank. At 9am the Prins Hendrik arrived at Den Helder, with the saved people still soaking wet, and were brought to the local police station.

Due to the operation, the Carlot was damaged from coming alongside. She had damaged fences, torn fenders and a damaged wheelhouse.

==== Aftermath ====
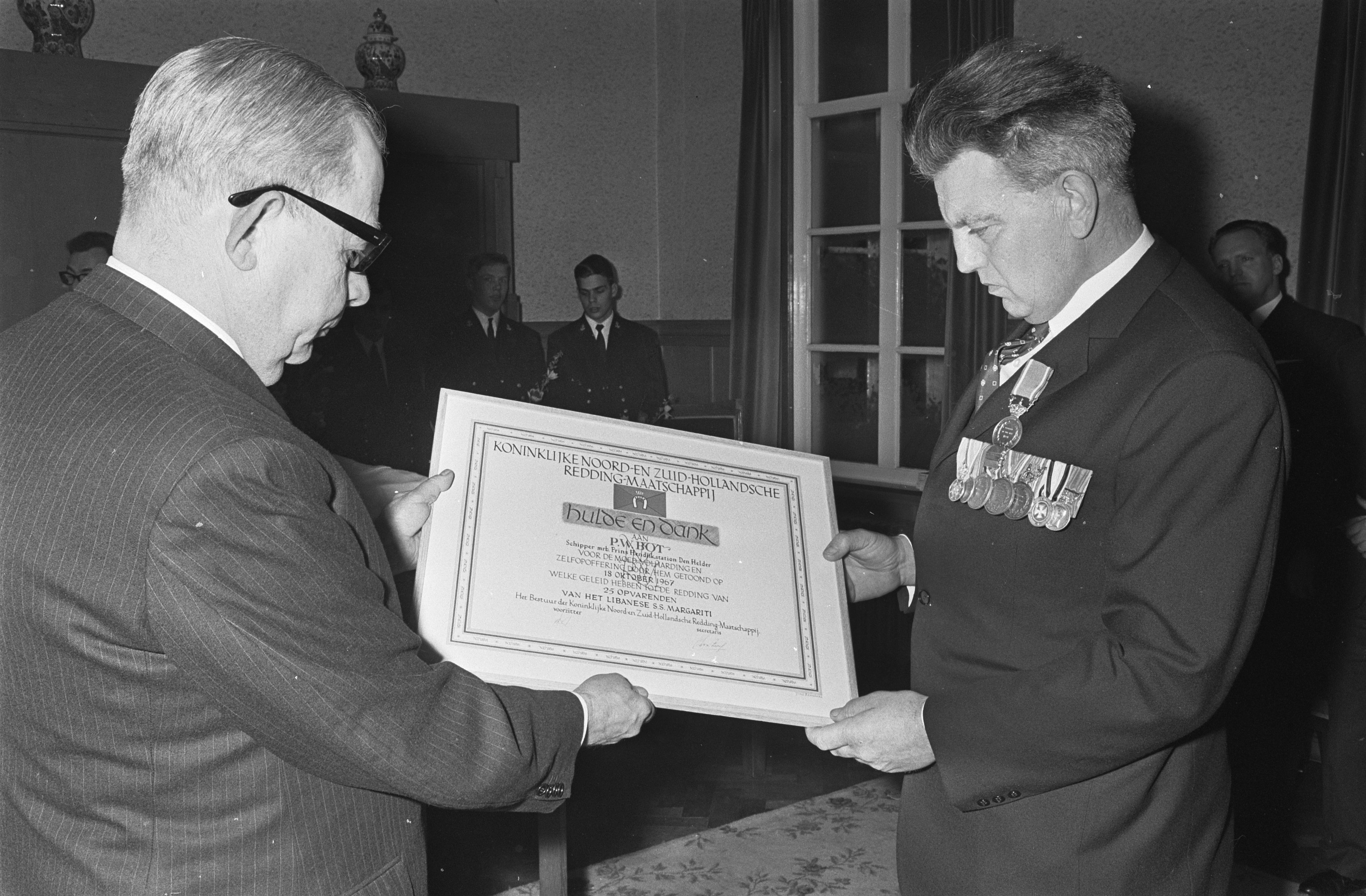
Rescuers of the Prins Hendrik were awarded in January 1968. Piet Bot (pictured) received the gold medal of the Royal Netherlands Sea Rescue Institution

In late October oil cans washed ashore, presumably from the Margariti. In November the ship was considered lost. It wasn't worth the cost to salvage the ship.

In January 1968, the rescuers of the Prins Hendrik received awards for their heroic deeds. Schipper Piet Bot received the gold medal of the Royal Netherlands Sea Rescue Institution with the other five crew members receivind the silver medal.

Bot was often remembered for this rescue operation and became a renowned rescuer.

== Wreck ==
Shortly after the beaching, Vlielander beachcombers took several items including: a lifebuoy, the ship's clock, a telegraph key, a bag of signal flags and some small souvenirs. Many divers went later to the wreck to find the ship's bell, but it was never found.
