= SS Byron D. Benson =

American oil tanker (1922–1942)

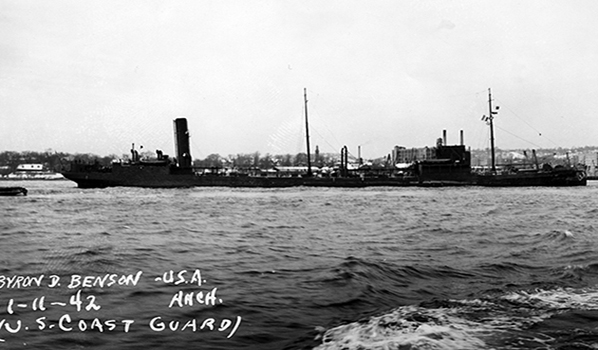
- Byron D. Benson photographed on 11 January 1942

History

United States
- Name: Byron D. Benson
- Namesake: Byron Benson
- Owner: Tide Water Oil Company
- Builder: Oscar Daniels Shipbuilding Co., Tampa
- Yard number: 11
- Laid down: June 29, 1920
- Launched: September 15, 1921
- Sponsored by: Miss Jane Benson
- Commissioned: January 26, 1922
- Maiden voyage: January 28, 1922
- Home port: New York (1922–1933); Wilmington (1934–1942)
- Identification: US Official Number 221861; Call sign MDJG (1926–1933); Call sign KDWN (1934–1942)
- Fate: Sank on April 8, 1942

General characteristics
- Type: Tanker
- Tonnage: 7,953 GRT; 4,932 NRT; 12,920 DWT
- Length: 465.4 ft (141.9 m)
- Beam: 60.2 ft (18.3 m)
- Depth: 27.8 ft (8.5 m)
- Installed power: 596 nhp, 2,800 ihp (2,100 kW)
- Propulsion: Vulcan Iron Works 4-cylinder quadruple expansion
- Speed: 10 1/2 knots (19.4 km/h; 12.1 mph)

Byron D. Benson was a steam tanker built in 1920–1921 by Oscar Daniels Shipbuilding Co. of Tampa for Tide Water Oil Company, a subsidiary of Standard Oil, with intention of operating between New York and oil-producing ports of the southern United States and Mexico. The ship was named after Byron D. Benson, the first president of Tide Water Oil.

== Design and construction ==
Early in 1920 Tide Water Oil Company decided to add another tanker to expand their fleet of four vessels operating between the southern oil ports and New York and New Jersey. The contract for the new vessel was awarded to the Oscar Daniels Shipbuilding Co. and the ship was laid down at the shipbuilder's yard in Tampa, Florida, (yard number 11) in June 1920, and launched on September 15, 1921, with Miss Jane Benson of New York, granddaughter of Byron D. Benson, serving as the sponsor.

The sea trials were held on January 12–13, 1922, in the Gulf of Mexico off Tampa during which the steamer performed satisfactorily and was able to exceed her contract speed. Following an inspection, the steamer was transferred to her owners and departed for an oil storage site of Puerto Lobos, near Tamiahua, in ballast on January 28.

=== Specifications ===
As built, the ship was 465.4 feet (141.9 m) long (between perpendiculars) and 60.2 feet (18.3 m) abeam, a depth of 27.8 feet (8.5 m). Byron D. Benson was assessed at 7,953 GRT and 4,932 NRT and had a deadweight of approximately 12,920. The vessel had a steel hull with double bottom, and a single 596 Nhp oil-burning quadruple expansion steam engine, with cylinders of 24-inch (61 cm), 35-inch (89 cm), 51-inch (130 cm) and 75-inch (190 cm) diameter with a 51-inch (130 cm) stroke, that drove a single screw propeller and moved the ship at up to 10 1/2 knots (12.1 mph; 19.4 km/h).

The ship was built on the Isherwood principle of longitudinal framing providing extra strength to the body of the vessel, had two main decks and a shelter deck. Byron D. Benson had electric lights installed along the decks, and was also equipped with wireless of De Forest type.

== Operational history ==
After completion of sea trials, the tanker was transferred to her owners and departed for her maiden trip on January 28, 1922, to Puerto Lobos, a large oil storage facility on the Mexican Gulf coast. Byron D. Benson continued carrying crude oil between the Mexican ports of Puerto Lobos, Tuxpan and Tampico and New York through the end of September. Following a decline in the production of Mexican oilfields around that time, the tanker along with many other vessels, was rerouted to carry oil from Californian oilfields instead. The tanker passed through the Panama Canal on October 30 on her first trip to San Pedro and again on her return journey on November 24 with 12,000 tons of oil destined for New York. The tanker continued sailing on the California to New York route through mid 1928, with occasional trips to and from Galveston. For example, she made six round-trip journeys between August 1924 and July 1925 season each time carrying between 10,000 and 12,000 tons of crude oil on her eastward trips. During the first six months of 1927 she was briefly put on the Gulf coast to New York route, carrying oil from ports of Galveston, Texas City and Baytown to New York and New Jersey. In June 1928 the tanker was chartered for one trip to Asia, carrying 11,386 tons of crude oil from Houston to Yokohama.

Following her return from Japan Byron D. Benson was reassigned to the Gulf to New York route carrying crude oil from the terminals of Magnolia Petroleum Company in Beaumont and Sinclair Oil Corporation and Texas Company in Port Arthur to the refineries in the Northeast ports of New York and Philadelphia, including Tidewater Oil own refinery in Bayonne. The vessel continued serving that route, as well as transporting crude and fuel oil from Houston to the ports of the Northeast through the remainder of her career.

On January 10, 1942, Byron D. Benson was returning from Port Arthur to Bayonne when around 19:30 in foggy weather she rammed Canadian coastal freighter Continent four miles south of Scotland Lightship, off New Jersey coast. The 466 GRT vessel quickly filled with water and sank, leaving her entire fourteen men crew in icy waters. The tanker stood by for two hours and was able to rescue all but one of the crew men before landing them at Staten Island. The ship received only slight damage and could continue her operations.

== Sinking ==
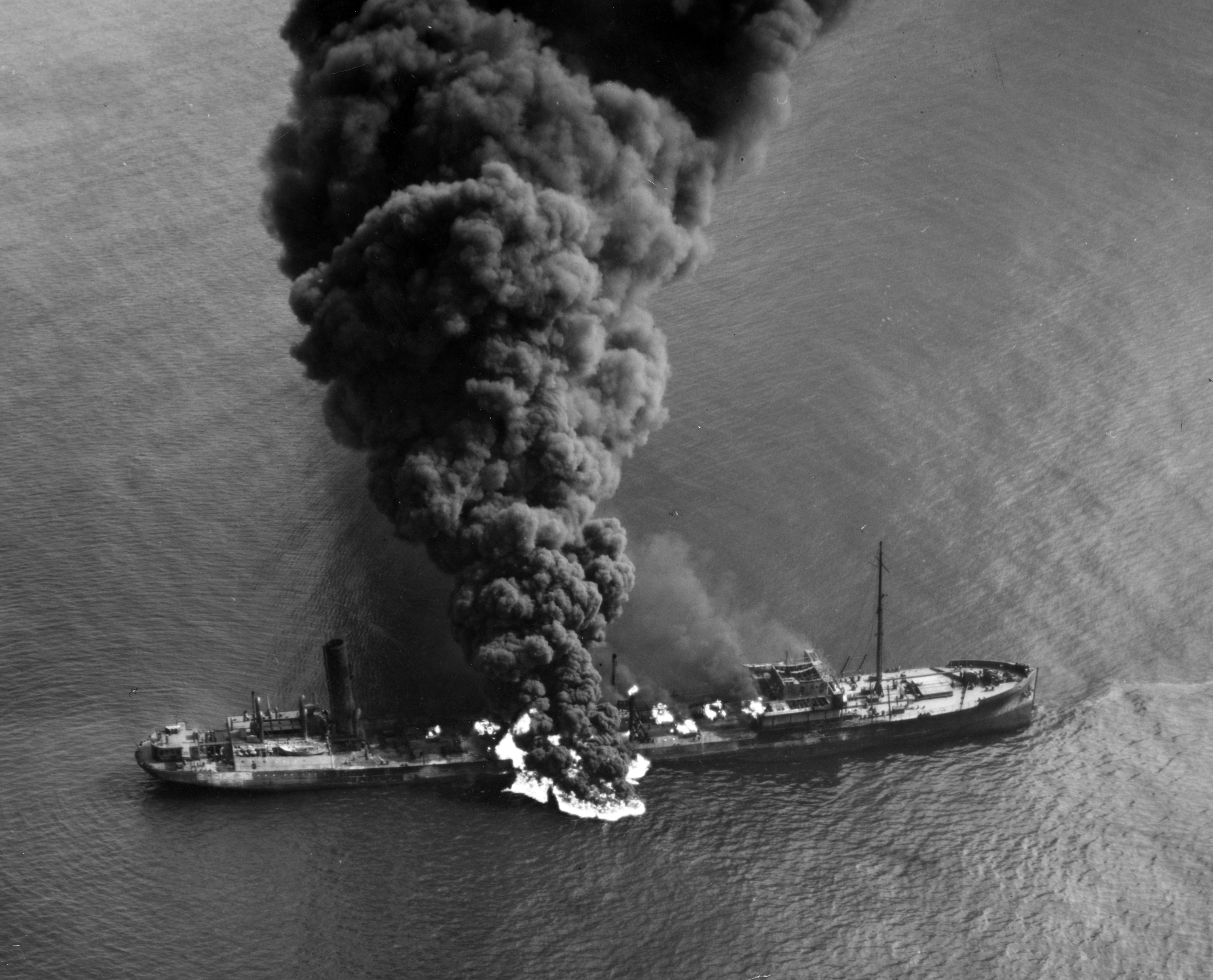
Byron D. Benson on fire after being torpedoed by U-552

Byron D. Benson departed Port Arthur on March 27, 1942, for Bayonne transporting 91,500 barrels (14,550 m^{3}) of crude oil. The vessel was under command of captain John MacMillan and had a crew of eight officers and twenty nine men. The tanker started the travel on her own, but in early April she eventually caught up with a small convoy consisting of another tanker, Gulf of Mexico, escorted by two navy ships, USS Hamilton and HMT Norwich City.

During the night of April 4, 1942, as the convoy slowly moved north along the coast at approximately 6.0 knots (11.1 km/h; 6.9 mph) it was spotted and followed by German submarine U-552. At 22:47 local time on April 4, when the convoy was about 8 nautical miles (15 km; 9.2 mi) off the Carrituck Inlet, just past Kill Devil Hills, U-552 fired a single torpedo from approximately 1,000 yards which struck Byron D. Benson on the starboard side amidships, between #7 and #8 holds. The explosion sent crude oil several hundred feet up in the air, and it started pouring out with the fire spreading rapidly. The panic spread among the crew as it started quickly abandoning the burning vessel but failing to shut down the engines in the process.

Due to the loss of all starboard side lifeboats, only two port side lifeboats were launched. One, containing the captain and nine other men, drifted into flames and was never seen again. The men in the second boat were rescued by Hamilton, while Norwich City picked up a lone man clinging to a raft. All survivors were safely landed in Norfolk, but because of the running engines Byron D. Benson continued moving and burning for the next three days before finally sinking on April 8 in an approximate position 36°8′57.77″N 75°14′41.57″W.
