= Fedrigoni =

Italian paper manufacturer

Fedrigoni S.p.A.
- Company type: Public
- Industry: Paper, Manufacturing
- Founded: 1888; 138 years ago in Verona, Italy
- Founder: Giuseppe Antonio Fedrigoni
- Headquarters: Piazzale Lodi 3; 20137, Milano; Italy Viale Enrico Fermi 12; 37135, Verona; Italy
- Key people: Marco Nespolo (CEO)
- Products: Paper; adhesives; packaging
- Brands: Acucote; Cordenons
- Revenue: €626 million (2007)
- Owner: Bain Capital (46.33%); BC Partners (46.33%)
- Number of employees: 5,000 (2022)
- Website: fedrigoni.com

Fedrigoni is a large paper manufacturer in Italy founded in 1888 by Giuseppe Antonio Fedrigoni, and one of the leading paper companies in Europe. Fedrigoni owns paper mills in Verona, Arco di Trento, Riva del Garda, Fabriano, and Pioraco. Three companies — Cartiere Miliani Fabriano, Fedrigoni Cartiere, and Fabriano Securities — merged in 2011 to form Fedrigoni S.p.A. In recent years, Fedrigoni has expanded its business in luxury packaging and self-adhesives. The CEO is Marco Nespolo.

In 2011, the firm opened the Institute of Paper History Gianfranco Fedrigoni (ISTOCARTA) in Fabriano.

Bain Capital acquired Fedrigoni in April 2018 for €600 million.

In November 2022, Fedrigoni acquired Papeterie Zuber Rieder, a Boussières-based manufacturer of specialty papers for wine and spirits labels. The company announced in August 2023 that it would construct an "Innovation Centre" at its headquarters in Verona.

The company has also donated machinery and equipment to the Paper and Watermark Museum in Fabriano.

== Fedrigoni 365 ==
Fedrigoni is also known for its annually-produced book-style art calendars called Fedrigoni 365, produced since 2018 and featuring work by hundreds of different artists and studios.

The first volume, in 2018, was printed entirely on black paper. In 2019, a range of white paper was used. The 2020 edition features a rainbow-like paper spread, "employing the full family of 16 colours from [Fedrigoni's] Woodstock paper range".

Fedrigoni 365/2021 was digitally printed in partnership with Ricoh — each book features a unique, randomised selection of artwork. The 2022 calendar featured four volumes, each printed by a separate company and bound differently, with the fourth volume digitally printed in multiple variations. In 2023, the theme was "love"; each book was printed on a unique selection of red and pink papers, and proceeds were donated to the British Heart Foundation.

== See also ==
- Cartiere Miliani Fabriano
