= HMT Svana =

History

United Kingdom
- Name: HMT Svana
- Builder: Smith's Dock Company.
- Launched: 30 July 1930
- Acquired: April 1940
- Fate: Sunk on 8 April 1942

General characteristics
- Displacement: 268 tons

HMT Svana (FY 1707) was a minesweeper whaler of the Royal Navy during the Second World War.

She was originally built for the South Georgia Co. Ltd. by Smiths Dock Co., Ltd. (South Bank-on-Tees, U.K.) and operated by Christian Salvesen & Co., Leith, UK. She was launched on 30 July 1930 with a displacement of 268 tons. She was taken over by the Admiralty in April 1940 and assigned to the Royal Naval Patrol Service. Under the command of Lt. John McDonald Ruttan, DSC, RCNVR she was bombed and sunk off Alexandria, Egypt on 8 April 1942.
