= Sequana Capital =

French pulp and paper company

- Website: wormsetcie.com

Sequana Capital was a French pulp and paper company.

== History ==
The company was founded as a coal importing business known as Worms and Cie in 1848. After diversifying into banking and finance it acquired Arjo Wiggins, a paper manufacturing business, in 2000. The founding Worms family stood down from the board in 2004 and it was renamed Sequana Capital in 2005. Following a protracted dispute with British American Tobacco over the payment of dividends, it was placed in liquidation in 2019.
