= Silver Line (shipping company) =

House flag used by Silver Line.

The Silver Line was a shipping company formed in 1908, part of the British Merchant Navy. By the 1930s they were offering round the world passenger/cargo services, with the passenger fare on a freighter being £100. Entirely on foreign service, the ships did not include UK ports of call. Managing owners were the S & J Thompson family. Most of their merchant ships bore the name Silver followed by the name of a tree. The Second World War claimed 11 of their ships. One of them, the Silverfir, was sunk by the German battleship Scharnhorst on a voyage from Manchester to New York in 1941. Silver Line switched to tramping around the world in the 1950s, then went through several ownership changes, and by 1985, with the sale of their last ship, was no more.

The Silverplane, a sleek twin funnel vessel of 7,226 gross tons built in 1948, was sold to the Cunard Line in 1951 and renamed Alsatia II, and so was her sister ship Silverbriar, to become Andria I. Their forward funnels were false, containing the chart room and the captain's cabin, looked like miniature Queen Elizabeths, and carried just 12 passengers, the maximum allowed without a regulation onboard doctor. They were sold to the Republic of China and renamed Union Freedom and Union Faith respectively. The latter ship was demolished in a fiery collision with an oil barge outside New Orleans in 1969, with considerable loss of life.

An associated company, Joseph L. Thompson & Sons of Sunderland, was involved in the design of the first Liberty ships that saw service in World War II and beyond.

During the 1970s, Silver Line had a fleet of chemical tankers carrying many types of (often hazardous) cargoes; from sulphuric acid to tetraethyllead. These ships often traded in the Baltic region. They were usually called Silver- plus the name of a bird of prey (e.g. Silvermerlin, Silverosprey, etc.). Promotion on these ships could be very rapid for those officers prepared to serve regularly on them. Captains of 25 years of age were not uncommon.

The company also had bulk carriers, tankers, OBOs and general cargo ships. The Silvermain and Silverfjord were on a regular run between Japan and the US, carrying grain one way and Toyota cars the other.

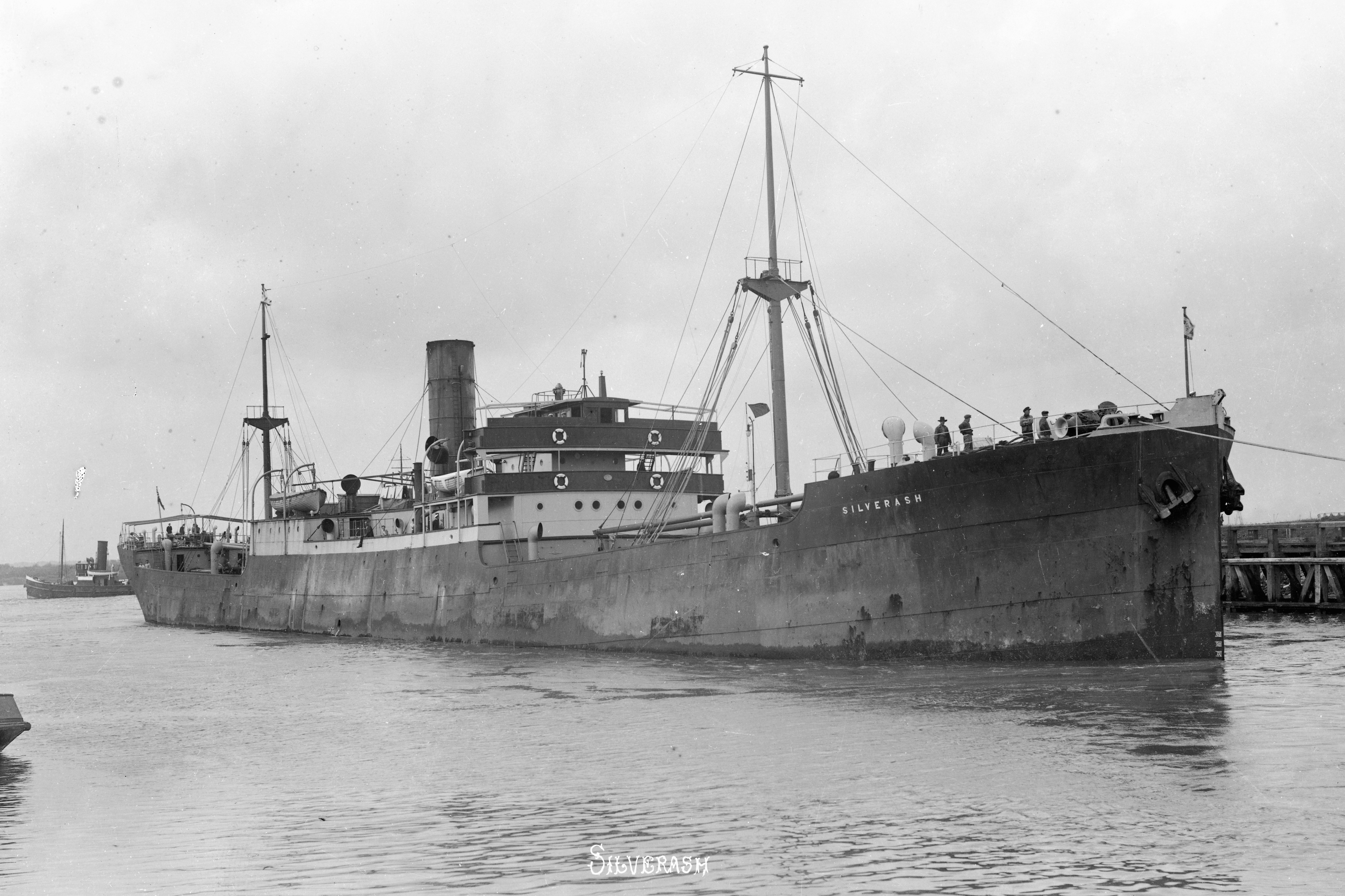
The 1918 built Silverash arriving in Antwerp

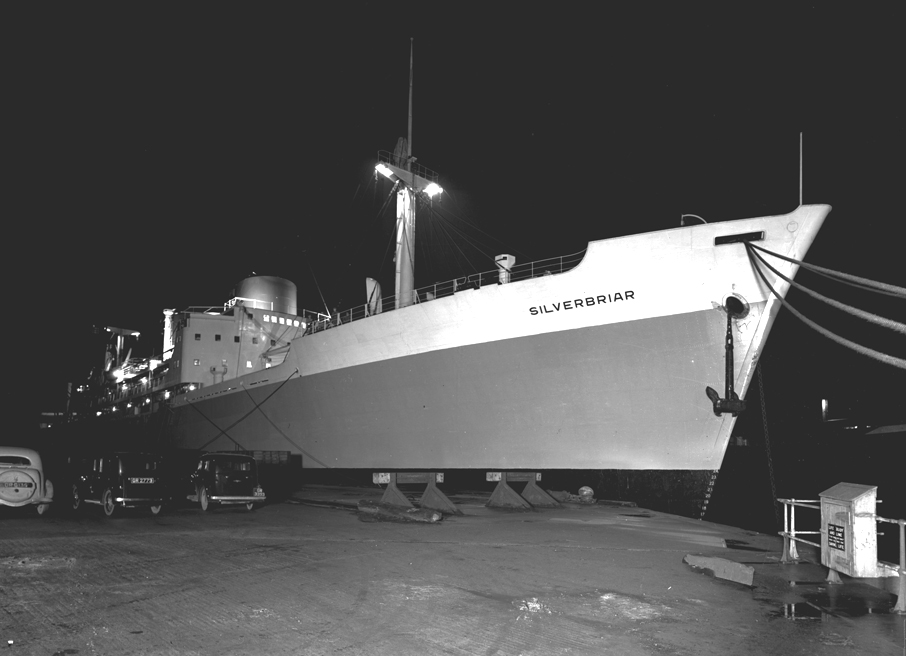
The newly built Silverbriar, February 1948

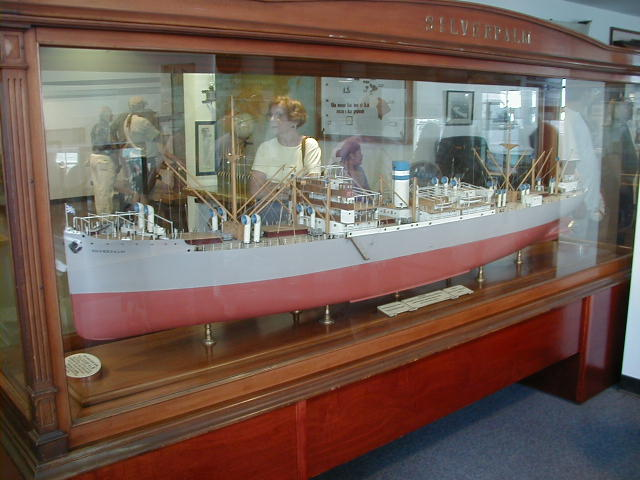
Model of TSMV Silverpalm (1929, 6,373 GT), sister ship to the Silverwalnut, on display at the Los Angeles Maritime Museum, California. Model, used for movie backgrounds, was donated by the estate of Marantz Aviation, model suppliers to the movie industry. Silverpalm was torpedoed and sunk by U-boat U-371 in 1941 on a voyage from Calcutta to Glasgow with the loss of all hands.

== Ships ==
Ship	Launched	Tonnage (GRT)	Notes and references
SS Silverash	1904	3,753	Built by Joseph. L. Thompson & Sons, Ltd., Sunderland and owned at the time of her loss by St. Helens Steam Shipping Co. (1912), Ltd. (Stanley & John Thompson), London On 6 October 1915, she was on a voyage from Barry, via Malta, to Moudros. She was sunk by the SM U-33 184 nautical miles (341 km) E of Malta. There were no casualties
MV Silveray	1925	4,535	Built by Joseph. L. Thompson & Sons, Ltd., Sunderland and powered by a Doxford diesel engine. She was torpedoed and sunk by U-751 on 5 February 1942 S of Halifax, Nova Scotia while en route from Liverpool to New York.
MV Silverbeech	1925	5,319	Built by James Laing & Sons Ltd, Sunderland and powered by a Doxford diesel engine. The cargo ship / armed merchantman was torpedoed and sunk by German submarine U-159 SE of the Canary Islands.
MV Silverbelle	1927	5,302	Built by Joseph. L. Thompson & Sons, Ltd., Sunderland and powered by a Doxford diesel engine. She was en route from Durban - Freetown - Liverpool carrying a cargo of 6,000 tons of phosphate and general cargo, including palm oil, copper and cocoa beans when she was torpedoed by German submarine U-68 and sunk SW of the Canary Islands.
MV Silvercedar	1924	4,354	Built by Doxford, Sunderland and powered by a Doxford diesel engine. She was en route from New York - Sydney - Liverpool in Convoy SC 48 carrying 7,300 tons general cargo, including steel when she was torpedoed by German submarine U-553 SE of Cape Farewell. She sank in 7 minutes. The master (Thomas Keane), 18 crew members, two gunners and one passenger (DBS) were lost. 19 crew members and seven gunners were picked up by Free French corvette Mimosa (J 6254) and landed at Reykjavik.
MV Silverfir	1924	4,347	Built by Doxford, Sunderland and powered by a Doxford diesel engine. She was sunk by the German battleship Scharnhorst, while on a voyage from Manchester to New York. 40 survivors taken POW on board the raider.
MV Silverhazel	1927	5,302	Built by Joseph. L. Thompson & Sons, Ltd., Sunderland and powered by a Doxford diesel engine. She ran aground and was wrecked in San Bernardino Strait, Philippines, while on voyage from Vancouver to Bombay.
SS Silverlaurel	1939	6,142	Built by Joseph. L. Thompson & Sons, Ltd., Sunderland and powered by a single screw steam turbine engine making 14 knots. She was en route from Douala – Falmouth – Hull carrying 2.949 tons cocoa beans. 2.423 tons palm oil, 758 tons, timber, 303 tons lumber, 317 tons rutile, 66 tons coffee, 30 tons ramie, 195 tons of rubber. She was torpedoed by U-486 on 18 December 1944. 68 crew saved.
MV Silvermaple	1927	5,313	Built by James Laing & Sons Ltd, Sunderland and powered by a Doxford diesel engine making 13.5 knots. On 26 Feb 1944, U-66 attacked the convoy STL 12 about 130 nautical miles (240 km) W of Takoradi and reported one ship sunk and another damaged. However, the only ship hit and sunk was the Silvermaple. The Master (William Candlish Brydson), 5 crew members and 1 gunner were lost. 47 crew members, 9 gunners and 1 passenger were picked up by HMS Kildwick (Z 06) (Lt P. Pannell) and landed at Takoradi on 27 February.
MV Silverpalm	1929	6,373	Built by Joseph. L. Thompson & Sons, Ltd., Sunderland and powered by a Richardsons Westgarth & Company diesel engine making 14 knots. At 03:26 hours on 12 Jun 1941, U-371 hit her with two torpedoes and observed it sink after 38 minutes. She was reported missing in the North Atlantic after being seen the last time on 1 June. On 15 July, a lifeboat with 8 bodies was sighted by the British trawler Cave. The Master (Richard Long Pallett), 53 crew members, 11 gunners and 3 passengers were lost.
MV Silverpine	1924	5,066	Built by Swan Hunter & Wigham Richardson, Ltd., Newcastle-upon-Tyne and powered by a Richardsons Westgarth & Company diesel engine making 13 knots. On 5 December 1940 she was torpedoed and sunk by the Italian submarine Argo, while on a voyage from Liverpool to New York with the loss of 35 lives.
MV Silverteak	1930	6,770	
MV Silverwillow	1930	6,373	Built by Joseph. L. Thompson & Sons, Ltd., Sunderland and powered by a Richardsons Westgarth & Company diesel engine making 13.5 knots. On 30 October 1942, when en route from Lagos - Freetown – Liverpool, in Convoy SL-125, and carrying a general cargo of 9,000 tons, she was torpedoed by German submarine U-409 and sunk NNW of Madeira. 5 persons lost from a total of 67. The master, 49 crew members, 7 gunners and 4 passengers were picked up by the British auxiliary patrol vessel HMNZS Kelantan (F 166) (Lt A.E. Jones) and landed at Gourock on 8 November.
MV Silveryew	1930	6,373	Built by Joseph. L. Thompson & Sons, Ltd., Sunderland and powered by a Richardsons Westgarth & Company diesel engine making 13.5 knots. At 00:36 hours on 30 May 1941, the unescorted Silveryew was hit in the stern by one of two torpedoes from U-106 and sank W of the Cape Verde Islands. Reports that one crew member was lost are untrue. It is also untrue that the Master (James Smith), 49 crew members and 3 gunners made landfall at San Antonio, Cape Verde Islands. The Master (James Smith, aged 52) perished as did Assistant Steward, Chow Ah San (aged 41) and Chief Steward, Yue Chank Sung (aged 44)

== See also ==
- Barges
- Cargo ship
- Liberty Ship
- Ship transport
- United States Merchant Marine
- Victory ship
