= Constantine Group =

British investing company

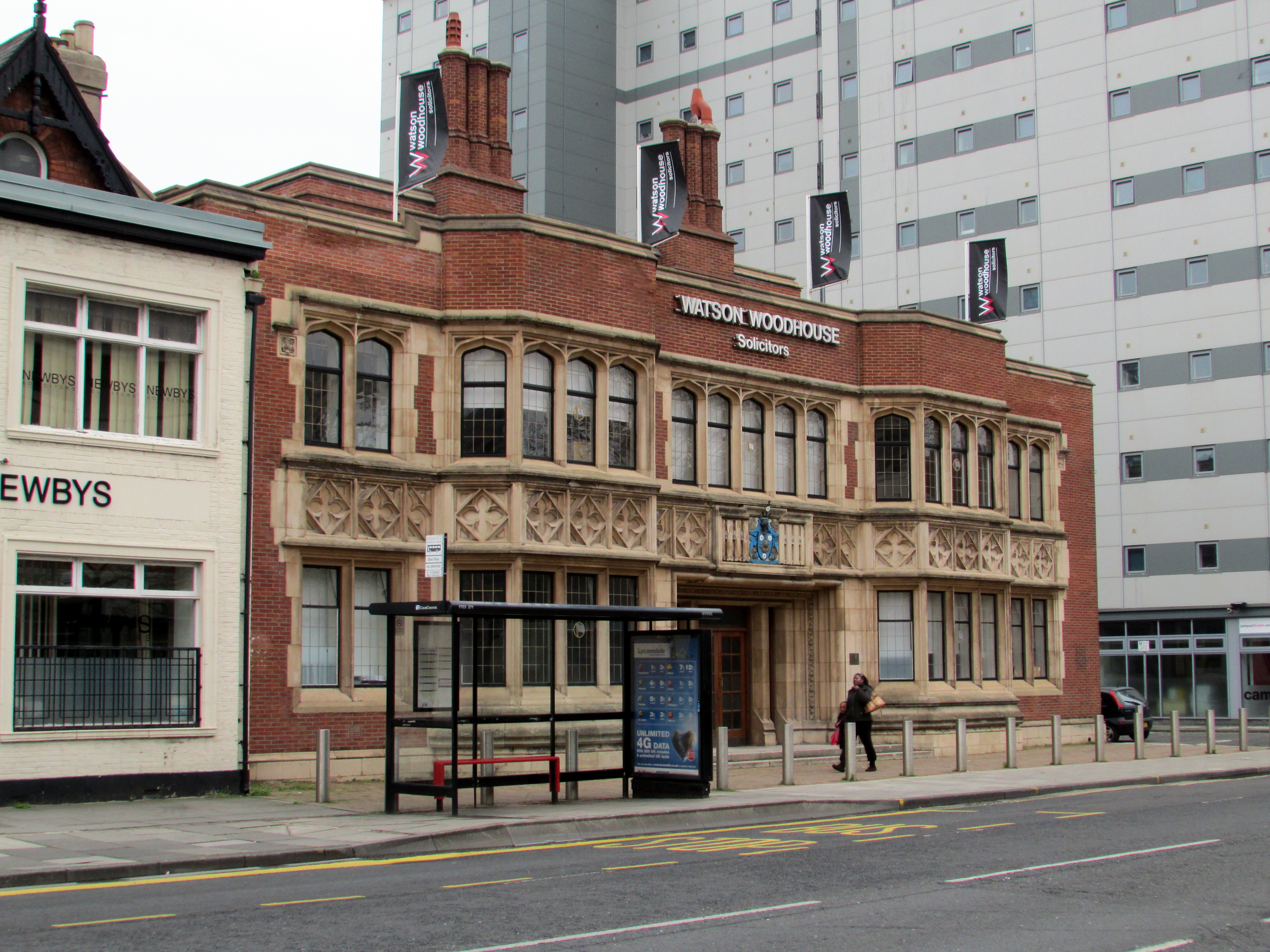
- Industry: Investing (formerly Shipping)
- Founded: 1885; 141 years ago in Middlesbrough, North Yorkshire, United Kingdom
- Founder: Joseph Constantine
- Website: constantinegroup.com

Constantine Group is a British family-owned company founded in 1885 by Northern England shipowner, industrialist, and philanthropist Joseph Constantine.

== Company and family founder ==
In 1885, the company started out as a shipping company —the Constantine & Pickering Steamship Co. later renamed the Joseph Constantine Steamship Line in 1920— with Joseph Constantine (1856–1922; born in Denmark where his father Robert Constantine, an English engineer, worked on the Schleswig-Holstein railways) who invested in his first ship Homewood, a three-masted timber sailing barque. He started of a shipping fleet which by the beginning of the First World War consisted of 22 ocean-going steamers and six coastal vessels.

Joseph Constantine married Marion Loudon Whitesmith at Dunoon, Scotland, in 1884. They had five children: three sons and two daughters.

In 1902, shipping magnate Joseph Constantine purchased the 1,000-acre Harlsey Hall estate, with its manor and country house, in East Harlsey near Northallerton, Yorkshire, which even featured its own private railway halt built specifically for the estate. He succeeded Mrs [Thomas] Standbridge as new Lord of the manor of Harlsey. He served as the High Sheriff of Yorkshire in 1916.

In 1922, Joseph Constantine died and was succeeded at the helm of his company by his first two sons, Major Robert Alfred Constantine (1885–1969), of Tanton Grange, Stokesley, Yorkshire, and William Whitesmith Constantine (1887–1970).

Constantine Technical College (now Teesside University), in Middlesbrough, North Yorkshire, formally opened on 2 July 1930 by the future King Edward VIII, the Prince of Wales, starting from a £80,000 donation by Joseph Constantine in 1916—equivalent to about £6,246,448.40 in 2026— to build the college, with slow progress before its opening.

The original headquarters of the Constantine Group (initially the Constantine & Pickering Steamship Co.) were located in Middlesbrough; for much of its operational history in the town, the company was managed out of York House (later the Watson Woodhouse Solicitors' head office), before later relocating its main operational headquarters to London as the business diversified.

In the 1950s, the company had three increasingly distinct business areas ships, shipping services and property, and several blocks of flats were developed in London including 100 Lancaster Gate and St James's Close.

In the 1960s, Robert and William Constantine retired, and Robert Constantine's sons, Norman and Joseph (Joe), became chairman and CEO respectively.

In 1969, they acquired Connells estate agents, and in 1984 the company was listed on the London Stock Exchange. It was eventually sold in 1991 when it had amassed a network of 130 branches.

== See also ==
- Susannah Constantine
