= USS Guyandot =

Gasoline tanker

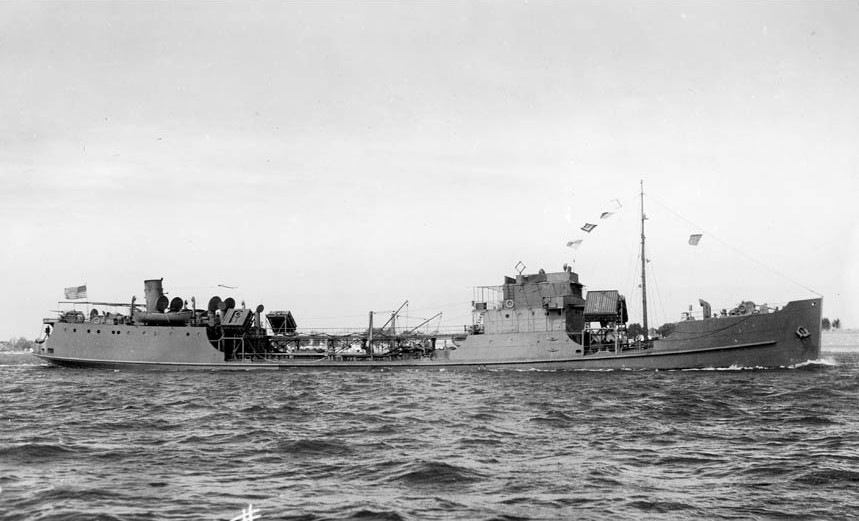
- MS Veedol No. 2, 12 October 1942

History

United States
- Name: Veedol No. 2 (1930-1943); Guyandot (1943-1949); Lac Noir (1949-1952)
- Namesake: Veedol, a Tidewater brand of commercial motor oil; Guyandotte River in West Virginia; Lac Noir (Vosges) A lake in the Vosges, Alsace, France
- Owner: Tide Water Associated Transport Corporation (Del.) (1930-1943); U.S. Navy (1943-1949); French Navy (1949-1952)
- Builder: Pusey and Jones Corporation, Wilmington, Delaware
- Yard number: 409
- Laid down: 19 October 1929
- Launched: 4 March 1930
- Completed: Delivered: 15 May 1930
- Acquired: by Navy: March 1943
- Commissioned: 17 April 1943
- Decommissioned: 12 January 1945
- Stricken: 28 April 1949
- Home port: Wilmington, Delaware
- Identification: U.S. Official Number:229673; Signal: MHTF
- Fate: Sold outright to France, 21 March 1949.

General characteristics
- Tonnage: 1,818 GRT, 1,055 Net
- Length: 255 ft (78 m) LBP; 252.1 ft (76.8 m) (registry)
- Beam: 44.2 ft (13.5 m)
- Draft: 15 ft 6 in (4.72 m) commercial, loaded; 16 ft 8 in (5.08 m) Navy
- Depth: 18.5 ft (5.6 m)
- Propulsion: diesel-electric, 2 X diesel generator sets, single electric motor and propeller
- Speed: 8 knots (15 km/h)
- Crew: 18 (commercial, registry)
- Armament: one single 3 in (76 mm) dual purpose gun mount; two 20 mm guns AA gun mounts

USS Guyandot (AOG-16) was a gasoline tanker acquired by the U.S. Navy as Veedol No. 2 (Note: The registered name was Veedol No. 2, not "Vedol II" — a form usually used to indicate a successor vessel name. The tanker was Number 2 of the name in a fleet, thus the official name.) from Tidewater Oil to serve as a gasoline tanker. The tanker served in Mediterranean operations often under air attack. After postwar decommissioning January 1945 in Algeria and service with the French under lend-lease the tanker was purchased in March 1949 by France serving under the name Lac Noir.

== Construction ==
Veedol No. 2 was built by Pusey and Jones Corporation, Wilmington, Delaware as hull 409, contract 1044, with keel laid 19 October 1929, launch on 4 March 1930 and delivery to Tidewater Oil on 15 May 1930. (Note: Tide Water Associated Transport Corporation (Del.) was apparently a subsidiary of Tide Water Oil Co. (N.J.). The tanker Veedol was operated by the New Jersey entity. Veedol No. 2 was under the Delaware entity. (See 1931 register, page 928.)) Registered dimensions were 252.1 ft (76.8 m) length between perpendiculars (registry length), 44.2 ft (13.5 m) beam with depth of 18.5 ft (5.6 m). Registry crew was eighteen.

The propulsion system consisted of two De la Vergne six cylinder diesel engines each developing 625 b.h.p. at 225 r.p.m. and driving a 410 kilowatt General Electric generator connected in series with a 1,000 horsepower electric motor driving a single propeller at up to 130 r.p.m.

The 1,818 GRT tanker was registered with U.S. Official Number 229673 and signal MHTF with home port of Wilmington, Delaware. The registered owner was Tide Water Associated Transport Corporation (Del.).

== World War II service ==
The Navy identified a need for shallow draft tankers to support operations in shallow Mediterranean ports to support the advances in that area. Veedol No. 2 was one of three tankers specifically identified for purchase and limited conversion to arm the ships and provide crew quarters the Navy crews. On 22 March 1943 Veedol No. 2 was requisitioned by the War Shipping Administration (WSA) for wartime service at Bayonne, New Jersey and simultaneously delivered to the Navy as purchaser of the vessel. The tanker was converted at Brewers Drydock, Staten Island and commissioned as Guyandot 17 April 1943.

Taking on a full load of fuel oil, she sailed for Bermuda on 1 May as part of Convoy UGL.4; from there she was taken in tow to Oran, where she arrived 26 May. From Oran she sailed to Bizerte, Tunisia, arriving there 8 June; although under frequent air attack Guyandot worked unceasingly shuttling oil through the wreck-laden channel. Sailing to Tunis on 27 June, Guyandot began fueling ships for the Sicilian invasion and, after the assault in late July, carried high octane fuel to the newly taken port of Palermo, again under heavy air attack.

=== Supporting invasion of Italy operations ===
Returning to Tunis 30 August, she began shuttling oil between that port and Bizerte and continued this duty until the Italian invasion was well under way. Arriving in Taranto, Italy, on 8 November, she performed yeoman work in carrying high octane aviation fuel from tankers to the shore. After a month in Palermo for drydock and overhaul, Guyandot returned to Taranto to take on gasoline and then sailed into the Adriatic for the port of Bari, arriving 8 February 1944. From Bari she shuttled oil north to Manfredonia to supply the 15th Air Force at Foggia; this work continued until late March, when she struck an underwater obstacle in Bari and, after two trips with a wooden patch, had to put in for more lasting repairs at Bizerte.

=== The first American ship to dock at Piraeus ===
Emerging from drydock 11 May, Guyandot spent a month carrying oil from Bizerte to Italy and then sailed again to Bari, arriving there 15 June 1944. From Bari she took high octane fuel to Manfredonia and Monopoli, carrying approximately 40 million gallons of gasoline for the forces moving up the Italian peninsula. An important break in her shuttle runs came from 2 November to 14 November, when she carried a load of high octane to Piraeus (Port of Athens), Greece; the British had landed in Greece only in late October and Guyandot was the first American ship to dock in Piraeus since before the outbreak of war.

=== Final operations ===
Back on the Bari-Manfredonia-Monopoli run, Guyandot continued shuttling oil until 9 December, when she sailed to Palermo for repairs and drydocking; on 7 January 1945, she crossed the Mediterranean to Bizerte.

== Decommissioning ==
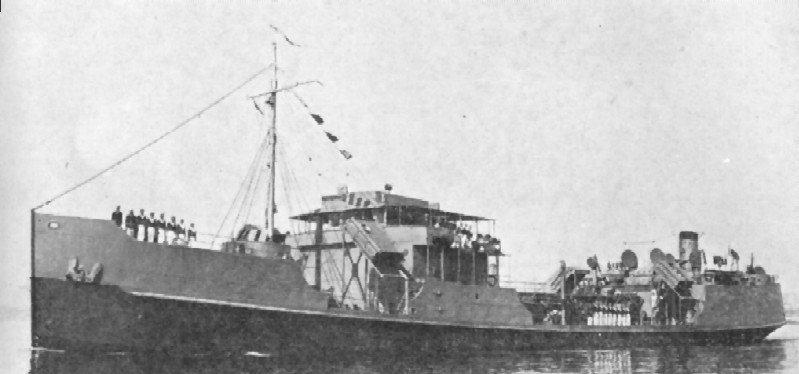
FS Lac Noir.

Guyandot was decommissioned at Bizerte on 12 January and transferred to the French Navy as part of lend-lease. France returned the ship to the Navy on 21 March 1949 and formally purchased Guyandot renaming the ship Lac Noir. Her name was struck from the Navy List 28 April 1949.

== Military awards and honors ==
Guyandot's crew was eligible for the following medals:

- American Campaign Medal
- European-African-Middle Eastern Campaign Medal
- World War II Victory Medal
