= Tidewater Oil Company =

Defunct petroleum refining company

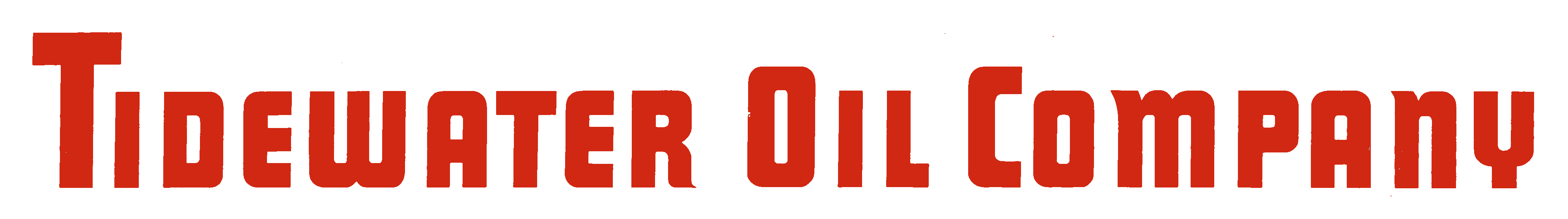
- Type: Privately held company
- Industry: Petroleum
- Founded: 1887; 139 years ago in New York City
- Founder: E. W. Marland
- Defunct: (original company) 1966; 60 years ago
- Fate: Acquired by Phillips Petroleum Co., then sold to others
- Headquarters: Tidewater Building, Los Angeles, California
- Brands: Veedol; Tydol; Flying A
- Owner: Andrew Yule & Co.
- Parent: Tide Water India

Tidewater Oil Company (rendered as Tide Water Oil Company from 1887 to 1936) was a major vertically integrated oil company that operated independently from 1887 to 1926, when it was sold to a holding company. Over the decades, it passed through various corporate hands. It sold petroleum and gasoline products and fuel under various brand names, including Tydol, Flying A, and Veedol.

In 2011, Veedol was sold by British Petroleum to Tidewater India. Now it is part of Andrew Yule and Company's Indian group and manufactures automotive oil for the Indian market on the sub-continent of South Asia. Tidewater does not have its own refinery, so it is dependent on base oil suppliers like HPCL and BPCL. It also manufactures a wide range of automotive lubricants. Its corporate headquarters is in Los Angeles, California.

== History ==
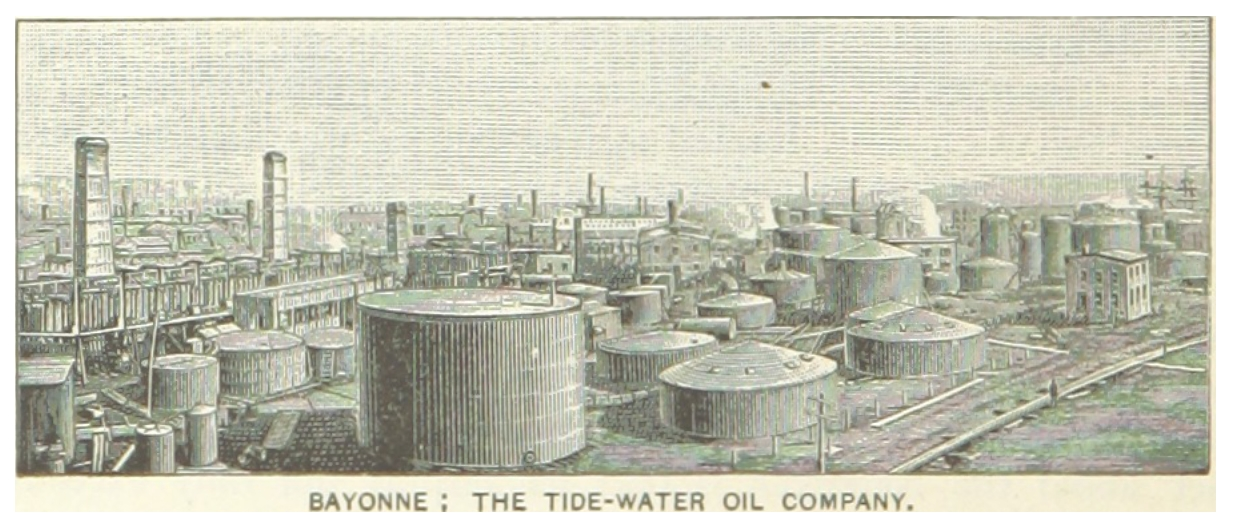
Tide Water plant in 1891

=== Tide-Water Pipe Company ===
In November 1878, the Tide-Water Pipe Company was founded by Byron D. Benson (ca. 1828-February 1888), Robert E. Hopkins, and David McKelvy (died May 10, 1918). Other sources include as founders Samuel Q. Brown (died October 5, 1909) and Alanson Ashford Sumner.

The capital at incorporation was $625,000 of which $500,000 was paid in as cash and $125,000 represented the rights-of-way for the Seaboard Pipe Line which were eventually not used. The Reading Railroad Company subscribed to $250,000 of the stock.

Benson, Hopkins, and McKelvy had forged a deal with Franklin Gowen, president of the Reading Railroad, to build a pipeline from the new Bradford oil field at Coryville, Pennsylvania, eastward to Williamsport, where the oil would be loaded into Reading tank cars for transport to independent refiners in Philadelphia and New York. Gowen agreed to put up $250,000, half the predicted cost of building the pipeline.

The result was the world's first long-distance oil pipeline: 102.87 miles. The line included 6-inch, 18.5 pounds per linear foot wrought iron pipe joints, ordered from the Reading Iron Company, which began shipments on January 30, 1879, and the National Tube Works, which followed on February 12. Railroads delivered construction materials to 10 shipping points along the route. (Note: Williamsport, Newberry (Reading Railroad); Linden, Jersey Shore, Hyner, North Bend (Philadelphia & Erie RR); Keating Summit, Port Allegany, Turtle Point (Buffalo, New York & Philadelphia RR); Frisbee (Buffalo Creek RR)) Laying of the pipe began near Oleona on February 22 and the last joints were put in place on May 22. The line rose 1,200 feet to cross the Allegheny Mountains near Waterville, then descended by gravity 2,100 feet. The cost of laying the line was 15.449 cents per foot, including freight (5.227), hauling (6.4) and joining (3.822). Through May 28, 1880, a total of 1,097,761.06 barrels (3,008 per day) was moved, of which 943,483.02 were transported to eastern refineries.

The pipeline could move 6,000 barrels per day. Starting at Pumping Station No. 1 at Coryville, oil flowed 22.43 miles to No. 2 station at Olmsted near Coudersport, then 80.44 miles to Williamsport. The pumping engines at Coryville began operation at 4 p.m. on May 28; oil arrived at 10:18 a.m. on May 30 at No. 2 station, which began to pump the same day at 3:20 p.m. After a pressure drop was detected, a piece of wood and some rope were removed from the pipe. Olmsted resumed pumping at 5 p.m. on June 2. Oil arrived at the tank farm 1.5 miles east of Williamsport at 7:20 p.m. on June 4. From there the loading station of the railroad could be reached by 12,700 feet of 8-inch gravity-flow pipe.

In 1880, the Equitable Pipe Line was absorbed, the Coryville pumping station was moved a few miles to Rixford and the 4-inch pipe was replaced by 6-inch pipe. The line was extended from Williamsport to Tamanend in the winter of 1881-82 and new pumping stations were built at County Line (No. 3 halfway between Olmsted and Williamsport), Muncy (No. 4 just southeast of Williamsport) and Shumans (No. 5). From Tamanend the New Jersey Central Railroad provided a direct route to New York bypassing Philadelphia in rail shipments. In 1887 the line was extended from Tamanend to Bayonne and pumping stations built at Hudsondale, Pa. (No. 6) and Changewater, New Jersey (No. 7).

The company owned a refinery in Bayonne, New Jersey, next to the larger refinery of the Standard Oil Company. On July 20, 1887, a fire that destroyed the Standard Oil Co. refinery at Constable Hook, also destroyed facilities belonging to the Tide Water Pipe Co., the Polar Oil Co., and the Ocean Oil Co.

In 1908 and 1909, the line was extended westward 546 miles from Rixford to Stoy, Illinois. The joints, made of basic steel, were laid from August 1, 1908, to April 13, 1909. Telegraph poles were erected from August 3, 1908, to April 10, 1909. On May 11, 1909, testing of the line with water began. The first oil arrived at Rixford at 7:15 a.m. on July 7, 1909. Seven pumping stations were later added. Pipeline loops were later added to the eastern portion of the line (Note: in late summer 1910 a base camp was established at Slate Run, Pennsylvania for laying 33 miles of 6-inch pipe.), which at the beginning of 1913 could move more than 10,000 barrels per day.

=== Tide Water Oil Company ===
The Tide Water Oil Company was incorporated in New Jersey on November 17, 1888.

In July 1916, 26,660 shares were offered to the public at $185 per share.

In June 1917, when the company was first listed on the New York Stock Exchange, its main pipeline had grown to include 833.69 miles of 6-inch trunk line from Stoy to Bayonne. Its pipeline system also included 304 miles of 6-inch trunk line loops; 2,000 miles of gathering lines; 20 pumping stations with redundant pump engines; and 92 tanks with a total capacity of 2,672,900 barrels. On one day that year, company pipelines held 1.6 million barrels of oil worth a total of $3,400,000.

The company held all or controlling interest in nine subsidiaries, including:

Subsidiaries (1917)
| Name | Incorporated | Date | Auth. cap. | Par | Issued | Owned by TWO | % |
|---|---|---|---|---|---|---|---|
| The Tide Water Pipe Co. Ltd | Pennsylvania (Note: company was not a corporation, but a Pennsylvania "partnership association" under the act of the General Assembly of the Commonwealth of Penn. of June 2, 1874: "An Act authorizing the formation of partnership associations, in which the capital subscribed shall alone be responsible for the debts of the association, [...]") | Nov 13, 1878 | $6,250,000 | $100 | $6,250,000 | $6,218,000 | 99.49 |
| Associated Producers Co | Pennsylvania | Nov 5, 1884 | $900,000 | $100 | $800,000 | $797,000 | 99.69 |
| Tidal Oil Co (Note: formerly Okla Oil Co, until renamed July 7, 1916; producing subsidiary west of the Mississippi, whereas the Associated Producers Co was the production subsidiary east of the Mississippi) | Oklahoma (Note: originally Indian territory) | Sep 27, 1907 | $1,000,000 | $100 | $582,000 | $495,000 | 85.05 |
| Platt & Washburn Refining Co (Note: Marketing subsidiary. Engaged in the selling of oil (mostly lubricants) to the consumer trade. Business was small until 1913 when more concentrated efforts were made to gain market share. The Veedol brand was created. After being part of Tide Water for 29 years, the company was dissolved and as of Dec 31, 1917 the business was continued seamlessly as the Veedol Department, which retained all current personnel and management as well as contracts, orders, accounts, notes, etc. of the former subsidiary.) | New Jersey | May 11, 1885 | $250,000 | $100 | $250,000 | $250,000 | 100% |
| Tide Water Oil Co of Massachusetts (Note: Marketing subsidiary) | Massachusetts | Jan 2, 1908 | $25,000 | $100 | $25,000 | $25,000 | 100% |
| American Oil Co | Rhode Island | Feb 7, 1902 | $100,000 | $10 | $50,000 | $37,300 | 74.60 |
| Allegheny Pipe Line Co | New York | Feb 28, 1903 | $9,000 | $5 | $9,000 | $5,350 | 59.44 |
| East Jersey RR & Terminal Co | New Jersey | Mar 12, 1901 | $300,000 | $100 | $257,000 | $257,000 | 100% |
| Currier Lumber Corp | Virginia | June 5, 1908 | $225,000 | $100 | $225,000 | $225,000 | 100% |

History of the Tide Water common stock (par $100)
| Date | Auth. cap | Purpose |
|---|---|---|
| Nov 17, 1888 | $5,000,000 | Acquisition of Polar Oil Company, Ocean Oil Company, Chester Oil Company (Note: 1885 map of plant at 39.8257°N 75.3959°W, in 1891 (map) belonged to Atlantic Refining Co), Lombard, Ayers & Company and purchase of real estate in Bayonne |
| May 15, 1907 | $20,000,000 | acquisition by exchange for stock of the Tide Water Pipe Line Co; for some time this company was the parent company and owned the entire stock of Tide Water Oil Co. until in 1907 the subsidiary took over the parent in a reorganization. |
| May 6, 1908 | $25,000,000 | extension of the pipe line to Illinois and purchase of producing lands in Illinois Illinois oil production boomed in 1906. For a few years it was 3rd largest producing state behind California and Oklahoma. |
| Mar 15, 1916 | $30,000,000 | acquisition of oil producing lands in Oklahoma. Holders of stock were given the right to subscribe at par to 1 share for each 5 shares held from Apr 10 to Jul 6, 1916. |
| Feb 20, 1917 | $40,000,000 | in 1917 $2,900,000 issued for a stock dividend (Note: $1m of this dividend issued out of authorized but unissued capital of 1907 and 1908 increases) and $8.1m unissued. Pursuant to a board resolution of May 2, 1919, 11,870 shares were issued and exchanged for the entire remaining stock (870 shares) of the Tidal Oil Co. not already owned by TWO, whose total issue was then 330,870 shares. TWO stock was trading between $236 and $250 in June 1919: each par $100 share of Tidal Oil had a market value of $3,220 to $3,411. |
| Dec 15, 1919 | $100,000,000 | Dec 1919 $8,617,400 plant extensions, 1 tanker, 1 power barge, employee stock program (Note: Dec 1919: 66,174 shares offered at par to existing stockholders (1 new share for each 5 held), 20,000 shares sold to trustee at par and reserved for distribution among employees, bringing the total amount listed on NYSE to $41,704,400 (330,870 + 330,870/5 + 20,000 shares). Proceed were used for cash amount of $7,500,000 in real estate, equipment, tank cars, 1 tanker and 1 self-propelled barge and rest for other plant extensions. TWO bought the adjoining property of the General Chemical Co. (Note: depicted on the 1912 Sanborn map) to dismantle their plant and reuse the land.) Dec 1920, $9,931,500 (failed) Mexican operation, 4 tankers, plant extensions (Note: Dec 1920: 99,315 shares offered at par to existing shareholders (1 new share for each 4 held), proceeds of which were used to finance the Mexican operation (estimated to cost more than $12,000,000): expansion of Bayonne refinery to process 15,000bpd domestic and 10,000bpd Mexican oil, $8,000,000 for 4 tankers delivered in 1921, development of properties in Amatlan and Zacamixtle districts (Veracruz) including a railway, a pipeline and a terminal. President R. D. Benson admitted the failure of the Mexican operation in the 1921 annual report, this was amidst a decline in demand for refined products that began in the last quarter of 1920 and made 1921 a "distressful" year for the oil industry. TWO signed a contract with the Associated Oil Co. in 1923 for delivery of ca. 9,000bpd from California to replace oil formerly produced or purchased in Mexico.) |

Annual reports
| Year | Detail |
fiscal year ending December 31
| 1915 | L |
| 1916 | XL |
| 1918 | XL |
| 1919 | XL |
| 1920 | XL |
| 1921 | L |
| 1922 | M |
| 1923 | S |

Timeline of common stock price (Note: 1917 1918 1919 1920 1921 1922 1923 1924 1925 1926 1927 1928 1929 1930 1931 1932 1933 1934 1935 1936) (Note: Volume: 1917 1918 1919 1920 1921 1922 1923 1924 1925 1926 1927 1928 1929 1930 1931 1932 1933 1934 1935 1936)
| | | Jan | Feb | Mar | Apr | May | Jun | Jul | Aug | Sep | Oct | Nov | Dec | Volume |
|---|---|---|---|---|---|---|---|---|---|---|---|---|---|---|
| 1917 | High | | | | | | 196 | 202 1/2 | 206 1/2 | 204 | (Note: Trading was slow for a few years. For example for 1917 the volume was: July: 881; August: 1,125; September: 598; October: 0; November: 200) | 175 | 175 | 3,579 |
| 1917 | Low | | | | | | 194 1/8 | 195 | 204 1/2 | 198 | (Note: Trading was slow for a few years. For example for 1917 the volume was: July: 881; August: 1,125; September: 598; October: 0; November: 200) | 170 | 165 | 3,579 |
| 1918 | High | 178 1/2 | 185 | 190 | 200 | | 186 | | 180 | 182 | 190 | | 200 1/4 | 1,342 |
| 1918 | Low | 178 | 185 | 185 | 200 | | 186 | | 180 | 182 | 190 | | 200 1/4 | 1,342 |
| 1919 | High | 220 | 221 | 220 | 235 | 250 | 250 | 246 | 242 | 238 1/2 | 265 | 275 | | 8,102 |
| 1919 | Low | 207 | 220 | 219 1/2 | 214 | 234 3/4 | 236 | 240 | 242 | 238 1/2 | 240 | 260 | | 8,102 |
| 1920 | High | 205 | | 229 | 215 | 205 | 200 | | | 210 | 215 | 200 1/2 | 199 | 3,019 |
| 1920 | Low | 205 | | 209 | 215 | 190 | 199 3/4 | | | 205 | 210 | 200 | 180 | 3,019 |
| 1921 | High | 170 | 165 1/4 | | 171 1/2 | 175 | 150 | 125 | | 120 | 151 1/4 | 149 | 150 | 9,805 |
| 1921 | Low | 161 | 165 1/4 | | 162 | 156 | 150 | 125 | | 119 | 123 | 145 | 135 | 9,805 |
| 1922 | High | 134 | 133 1/2 | 131 1/2 | 133 | 137 1/4 | 133 3/4 | 126 | 129 1/8 | 148 3/4 | 154 | 135 | 129 7/8 | 52,030 |
| 1922 | Low | 130 | 127 1/2 | 109 3/4 | 118 | 133 | 127 | 120 | 123 1/2 | 127 | 131 3/4 | 125 1/4 | 115 1/4 | 52,030 |
| 1923 | High | 133 | 138 3/8 | 144 | 131 1/4 | 125 | 120 | 103 1/4 | 102 | 101 5/8 | 104 | 123 1/2 | 122 7/8 | 60,250 |
| 1923 | Low | 120 | 128 | 128 | 125 | 116 | 95 | 94 | 98 | 95 1/2 | 99 | 99 3/4 | 112 5/8 | 60,250 |
| 1924 | High | 142 7/8 | 151 | 141 7/8 | 134 | 128 1/2 | 124 7/8 | 126 3/4 | 127 7/8 | 125 | 123 7/8 | 132 | 133 | 91,600 |
| 1924 | Low | 120 | 134 | 129 | 120 1/2 | 125 | 119 | 118 1/4 | 119 | 120 | 116 1/4 | 121 1/4 | 123 1/2 | 91,600 |
| 1925 | High | 148 3/4 | 152 | 149 7/8 | 134 3/4 | 147 | 149 | 142 1/8 | | | | | | 7,800 |
| 1925 | Low | 130 | 143 | 122 | 125 1/8 | 131 1/4 | 141 | 136 | | | | | | 7,800 |
no par
| 1925 | High | | | | | | | 36 1/4 | 33 1/4 | 33 3/4 | 36 | 36 5/8 | 36 7/8 | 217,500 |
| 1925 | Low | | | | | | | 33 | 30 1/2 | 30 1/4 | 30 1/2 | 32 | 34 | 217,500 |
| 1926 | High | 39 1/4 | 38 3/4 | 38 3/4 | 32 7/8 | 35 | 34 3/8 | 33 | 31 1/2 | 31 | 29 7/8 | 28 3/4 | 29 1/8 | 486,300 |
| 1926 | Low | 34 1/4 | 35 1/2 | 32 | 30 1/4 | 31 1/8 | 32 1/2 | 31 1/8 | 30 | 29 1/2 | 27 1/4 | 27 | 27 | 486,300 |
| 1927 | High | 29 1/8 | 27 7/8 | 27 1/8 | 25 1/8 | 24 7/8 | 24 | 24 | 24 3/4 | 24 | 22 1/2 | 23 | 24 | 48,700 |
| 1927 | Low | 27 1/2 | 27 | 24 3/4 | 23 1/8 | 22 3/4 | 22 1/2 | 19 | 22 | 23 | 21 3/4 | 21 5/8 | 22 | 48,700 |
| 1928 | High | 22 1/4 | 20 1/2 | 23 | 27 | 27 1/8 | 25 1/4 | 24 1/8 | 27 3/8 | 30 5/8 | 36 | 38 3/4 | 41 1/2 | 214,400 |
| 1928 | Low | 20 5/8 | 19 7/8 | 19 5/8 | 22 1/2 | 24 1/4 | 22 1/4 | 23 | 24 3/8 | 25 3/4 | 29 1/4 | 33 3/8 | 33 | 214,400 |
| 1929 | High | 37 5/8 | 33 1/2 | 34 1/2 | 35 1/2 | 38 | 40 | 35 1/8 | 37 | 35 | 33 3/4 | 23 1/2 | 22 1/2 | 137,800 |
| 1929 | Low | 30 1/2 | 27 1/8 | 29 | 31 3/4 | 33 1/2 | 34 1/8 | 33 3/8 | 32 1/4 | 33 | 29 3/4 | 14 | 20 | 137,800 |
| 1930 | High | 21 7/8 | 21 3/4 | 26 | 31 | | | 25 1/2 | | 21 1/4 | 15 1/2 | | 13 | 8,200 |
| 1930 | Low | 19 1/2 | 20 | 19 1/2 | 28 | | | 25 1/2 | | 21 1/4 | 15 1/8 | | 12 | 8,200 |
| 1931 | High | 15 | 15 1/8 | 18 | 17 7/8 | | | | 13 | | | 9 7/8 | | 6,500 |
| 1931 | Low | 10 1/2 | 12 1/2 | 16 1/2 | 12 | | | | 13 | | | 9 7/8 | | 6,500 |
| 1932 | High | | | 9 | | 7 1/8 | 6 | 7 1/2 | 10 | | 10 | 9 3/4 | 9 1/2 | 4,900 |
| 1932 | Low | | | 7 | | 5 1/8 | 5 | 6 | 10 | | 9 | 9 3/4 | 9 1/2 | 4,900 |
| 1933 | High | | | | 9 1/4 | 15 1/2 | 16 | | 18 | 20 | 20 | 24 1/8 | 26 | 2,200 |
| 1933 | Low | | | | 9 1/4 | 11 1/2 | 16 | | 18 | 19 | 20 | 21 | 26 | 2,200 |
| 1934 | High | | | 31 | 40 | 37 | 38 | 31 | | 31 | | 25 1/8 | 25 | 1,170 |
| 1934 | Low | | | 31 | 36 | 37 | 31 | 31 | | 30 | | 25 1/8 | 24 | 1,170 |
| 1935 | High | 27 1/2 | 27 1/2 | 27 1/4 | 28 3/4 | 32 1/2 | 40 | 41 | 42 1/4 | 43 1/2 | 40 | 43 1/2 | 48 | 5,770 |
| 1935 | Low | 27 1/2 | 27 1/2 | 26 3/4 | 28 1/2 | 28 3/4 | 37 | 35 | 37 1/2 | 39 | 40 | 43 1/2 | 40 | 5,770 |
| 1936 | High | 58 | 59 1/2 | 60 | 58 3/4 | 55 | 55 | 55 | 54 7/8 | 54 3/8 | 50 | | | 990 |
| 1936 | Low | 52 | 58 | 60 | 58 1/2 | 55 | 55 | 51 | 54 7/8 | 50 | 48 | | | 990 |

Par $100 preferred price range
| | | Jan | Feb | Mar | Apr | May | Jun | Jul | Aug | Sep | Oct | Nov | Dec | Volume |
|---|---|---|---|---|---|---|---|---|---|---|---|---|---|---|
| 1925 | High | | | | | | | | 100 | 100 | 101 | 101 | 100 1/4 | |
| 1925 | Low | | | | | | | | 100 | 100 | 100 | 99 | 99 | |
| 1926 | High | 103 | 102 5/8 | 102 1/8 | 94 | 94 | 94 1/2 | 93 | 93 | 92 5/8 | 90 3/8 | 90 1/4 | 90 | |
| 1926 | Low | 99 | 97 | 90 | 91 1/2 | 92 1/4 | 93 1/4 | 91 3/4 | 91 | 90 1/2 | 88 1/2 | 87 1/4 | 88 1/4 | |
| 1927 | High | 89 1/2 | 88 3/4 | 88 1/2 | 89 3/4 | 88 1/4 | 88 1/8 | 87 | 88 | 90 1/8 | 89 1/4 | 87 3/8 | 88 | |
| 1927 | Low | 88 1/2 | 87 1/2 | 87 1/2 | 87 1/2 | 87 | 87 1/2 | 86 1/2 | 86 1/2 | 88 1/2 | 86 1/2 | 85 | 85 3/4 | |
| 1928 | High | 90 3/4 | 90 1/2 | 89 | 93 1/4 | 94 1/2 | 92 1/4 | 89 | 89 | 91 | 95 1/4 | 96 1/4 | 100 1/8 | 39,900 |
| 1928 | Low | 87 | 88 1/2 | 88 | 88 3/4 | 92 | 88 | 86 3/4 | 86 3/4 | 87 1/2 | 91 1/2 | 94 3/4 | 96 | 39,900 |
| 1929 | High | 97 1/2 | 94 | 92 1/2 | 95 | 95 3/4 | 97 1/2 | 93 | 93 | 95 7/8 | 93 | 90 | 89 | 42,500 |
| 1929 | Low | 94 1/4 | 90 1/8 | 90 1/4 | 93 1/2 | 92 1/2 | 92 3/8 | 90 | 90 3/4 | 90 7/8 | 88 3/8 | 85 1/8 | 87 1/2 | 42,500 |
| 1930 | High | 90 | 88 | 91 3/4 | 94 7/8 | 94 1/4 | 93 1/2 | 86 7/8 | 92 1/2 | 91 | 86 | 85 1/2 | 82 | 23,100 |
| 1930 | Low | 86 7/8 | 86 1/8 | 86 1/4 | 90 1/8 | 90 7/8 | 85 1/2 | 83 | 90 | 87 | 85 | 82 | 68 | 23,100 |
| 1931 | High | 78 1/2 | 83 | 83 | 70 | 55 | 59 | 55 | 67 1/2 | 60 | 40 | 45 | 43 | 17,700 |
| 1931 | Low | 69 1/4 | 80 | 70 1/4 | 66 3/4 | 55 | 54 | 50 3/4 | 51 | 48 3/4 | 35 | 38 | 30 | 17,700 |
| 1932 | High | 35 1/8 | 34 | 41 | 35 3/4 | 40 | 35 | 44 1/2 | 60 | 62 | 50 | 50 | 48 | 10,760 |
| 1932 | Low | 31 3/8 | 30 | 35 | 30 | 30 | 31 | 37 | 50 | 51 | 46 1/2 | 49 | 45 | 10,760 |
| 1933 | High | 49 | 50 | 50 | 60 | 60 | 67 | 68 | 65 1/2 | 72 1/2 | 75 | 77 | 80 | 13,700 |
| 1933 | Low | 46 1/4 | 45 | 47 | 48 | 55 | 64 3/4 | 62 | 63 | 67 | 73 | 74 | 76 | 13,700 |
| 1934 | High | 82 | 85 | 88 | 96 1/2 | 96 1/2 | 95 7/8 | 94 1/2 | 95 | 96 1/2 | 97 | 97 3/4 | 100 1/2 | 24,000 |
| 1934 | Low | 80 | 82 | 84 1/8 | 88 | 88 | 92 | 93 | 92 1/2 | 93 1/2 | 94 | 95 | 97 5/8 | 24,000 |
| 1935 | High | 103 1/8 | 102 1/2 | 104 1/8 | 105 1/4 | 105 3/4 | 106 3/8 | 106 1/4 | 106 1/8 | | | | | 34,800 |
| 1935 | Low | 100 5/8 | 100 | 101 1/2 | 103 | 104 1/2 | 105 | 106 1/8 | 106 1/8 | | | | | 34,800 |

Outstanding shares
| Date | Common | Preferred |
|---|---|---|
| 1914 | 240,000 | n/a |
| 1915 | 240,000 | n/a |
| May 1923 | 496,735 | n/a |
| Dec 31, 1924 | 500,045 | n/a |
| Jun 30, 1925 | 504,429 | n/a |
| Nov 1925 | 2,017,741 | 250,598 |
| Nov 1926 | 2,138,373 | 207,061 |
| May 1927 | 2,158,047 | 207,052 |
| Nov 1927 | 2,168,285 | 207,052 |
| Sep 1931 | 2,191,821 | 199,446 |
| Jun 30, 1934 | 2,191,823 | 196,246 |
| Jun 30, 1935 | 2,191,860 | 190,763 |

Tide Water Oil dividends ($/share) (Note: Common: 1914-1915: 1916-17: 1918 to Sep 1927; Jun 1927 to Mar 1931: 20c quarterly; Jun 1931: 15c; Sep 1931: suspends; Mar 1932 resumes 25c; 1932, 1933, 1.25 till Sep 34: 1932-1934, 35c Mar 1935:)
| | Common | | Preferred |
| | Regular | Extra | Preferred |
|---|---|---|---|
| 1914 | 8 | 0 | n/a |
| 1915 | 8 | 0 | n/a |
| 1916 | 8 | 1 | n/a |
| 1917 | 8 | 12 + 0.1 share | n/a |
| 1918 | 8 | 11 | n/a |
| 1919 | 8 | 8 | n/a |
| 1920 | 12 | 4 | n/a |
| 1921 | 10 | 0 | n/a |
| 1922 | 0 | 0 | n/a |
| 1923 | 1 | 0 | n/a |
| 1924 | 4 | 0 | n/a |
| 1925 | 2 | 0 | n/a |
| | no par | | |
| 1925 | 0.5 | | |
| 1926 | 1.5 | | |
| 1927 | 0.975 | | |
| 1928 | 0.8 | | |
| 1929 | 0.8 | | |
| 1930 | 0.8 | | |
| 1931 | 0.35 | | |
| 1932 | 1 | | |
| 1933 | 1 | | |
| 1934 | 1.25 | | |

Crude runs to Bayonne refinery
| Year | Total | Total / day | Pennsylvania | Illinois | Oklahoma | Texas | Mexico | California | Misc |
|---|---|---|---|---|---|---|---|---|---|
| 1915 | 3,653,398 | 10,009 | 1,297,285 | 1,658,823 | 697,288 | | | | |
| 1917 | 3,997,000 | 10,951 | 1,261,000 | 1,281,000 | 1,455,000 | | | | |
| 1918 | 4,606,000 | 12,619 | 1,301,000 | 1,588,000 | 1,691,000 | | 26,000 | | |
| 1919 | 5,544,674 | 15,191 | 1,294,660 | 893,964 | 1,613,086 | 181,691 | 1,561,273 | | |
| 1920 | 6,576,786 | 18,019 | 1,607,376 | 1,215,243 | 2,134,879 | 209,905 | 1,407,860 | | 1,523 |
| 1921 | 5,650,862 | 15,482 | 1,115,183 | 569,364 | 1,409,533 | 111,317 | 2,412,033 | | 33,432 |
| 1922 | ? | 23,358 | ? | | | | 60% | | ? |

In May 1925, the common stock was split 4-for-1. Authorized capital was increased from 1,000,000 to 4,000,000 shares and each outstanding $100 par share was exchanged for 4 new shares of no par value.

In August 1925, the company issued $25,221,500 of 5% cumulative (par $100) convertible (Note: Preferred convertible at rate depending on the order of surrender: First block of $5,000,000: one share of no-par common for each $37.50 par value of preferred or 2 2/3 common shares for each preferred share; Second block of $5,000,000: one share for each $40 (2 1/2); Third block of $5,000,000: one share for each $42.50; For the remainder: one share for each $45 (2 2/9)) preferred stock to provide working capital, finance infrastructure, and retire its entire funded debt of $12,000,000. (Note: $12,000,000 of 6.5% 10-year bonds dated Feb 15, 1921 and subsequently listed on the NYSE. At the time of issue was the only funded debt of the company. Redeemed Aug 15, 1925 at 101 3/4 and interest.) The preferred was called on August 15, 1935 at $105 and the final $1.25 quarterly dividend, using ca. $1,800,000 from the cash reserve and a $19,000,000 3.23% 5-year bank loan dated Aug 15, 1935. (Note: $2,000,000 at 1.5% due Aug 15, 1936; $2,000,000 at 2% due Aug 15, 1937; $2,000,000 at 2.5% due Aug 15, 1938; $2,000,000 at 3% due Aug 15, 1939; $11,000,000 at 3.5% due Aug 15, 1940; average interest over 5 year period: 3.23%; saved on average $496,230 per year compared to the 5% rate of the preferred) Apparently $20,800,000/$106.25 or 195,765 shares were called and some 56,450 were converted, but a few seem to also have been bought on the market just prior to the call.

Securities owned by Tide Water Oil
| Owned company | Date | Authorized | Issued | owned by TWO | % TWO | Notes |
|---|---|---|---|---|---|---|
| Darby Petroleum Corp | 1929 | | | | 31.06% | exchanged for TWO's 51% in Tidal Osage Oil Co in order to avoid internal competition with Tidal Oil Co (100% owned) active in the same area However on May 14, 1929 631,319 Tidal Osage Oil shares were exchanged for a like number of Darby shares and Tidal Osage was merged into Darby (which now had 1,019,392 shares outstanding). |
| Darby Petroleum Corp | May 1930 | 1,250,000 | 1,019,392 | | ca. 1/3 | 1-for-2 reverse split |
| Darby Petroleum Corp | May 1930 | 750,000 | 509,696 | | ca. 1/3 | 1-for-2 reverse split |

Tide Water Oil acquisitions of distribution assets
| Date | Company | Area Served | Bulk plants | Service stations | Dealer outlets/accounts | Notes |
|---|---|---|---|---|---|---|
| May 1930 | Pioneer Distribution Co | Hazleton, Pennsylvania | 6 | 22 | 180 | |
| Jul 1930 | Pittsford Oil Co | Pittsford, New York | 1 | 3 | 225 | |
| Aug 1930 | Demmy Oil Co | Scranton, Pennsylvania | 2 | 6 | 125 | |
| Aug 1, 1930 | Little & Coffin Oil Co | Portland, Maine | 12 | 21 | 600 | |

=== Tide Water Associated Oil Company ===
In 1926, control of Tide Water Oil was sold to a new holding company, Tide Water Associated Oil Company, which also acquired a controlling interest in California's Associated Oil Company. Soon thereafter, Standard Oil Company of New Jersey took control of the company. Flying A became the primary brand name for the company, though the Tydol and Associated names were also retained in their respective marketing areas.

The Tide Water Associated Oil Company (incorporated in Delaware on March 6, 1926) offered for each share of Associated Oil stock (of which 2,290,412 shares were outstanding) 1 share of no-par common and 1/3 share of 6% par $100 cumulative preferred. An alternative offer by a syndicate formed by Blair & Co. and Chase Securities Corp. offered $58.50 per share of Associated Oil Company. For each share of no-par stock of Tide Water Oil, 1 1/3 share of TWAO was offered. The preferred stock of Tide Water Oil remained unchanged. The Blair/Chase syndicate concurrently offered a block of the 6% convertible preferred of TWAO ("the new $240,000,000 dollar company") to the public. The Justice Department concluded an anti-trust investigation on April 22, 1926, declaring the consolidation legal.

Development of properties of Associated Oil Co
| Expenditure of $60,000,000 | 1920 | 1925 | Increase |
|---|---|---|---|
| Lands owned and leased | 75,749 acres | 173,210 | 129% |
| Crude production (gross) | 9,027,724 (24,733bpd) | 18,211,030 (49,893bpd) | 101% |
| Pipe Line capacity | 37,000bpd | 165,000bpd | 346% |
| Refinery capacity | 24,000bpd | 75,000bpd | 212% |
| Marketing stations | 130 | 315 | 142% |
| Tanker fleet | 203,209bbl | 656,955bbl | 223% |
| Storage capacity | 12,671,300 | 24,294,300 | 91% |
...of Tide Water Oil Co
| Expenditure of $45,400,000 | 1920 | 1925 | |
| Crude production (net) | 4,571,674 (12,525bpd) | 5,576,858 (15,279bpd) | 22% |
| Number of wells | 4,776 | 6,734 | 41% |
| Refinery capacity | 25,000bpd | 53,000bpd | 112% |
| Storage capacity | 4,480,000 | 7,336,200 | 63% |
| Tanker fleet | none | 319,000bbl | |
| Tank cars | 959 | 1,453 | 51% |
| Refined products | 5,240,540 (14,358bpd) | 11,337,308 (31,061bpd) | 116% |

Progress of accumulation of subsidiary shares and TWAO shares offered for each subsidiary share during exchange campaigns
| From | % | Until | % | Sub | Offer |
|---|---|---|---|---|---|
| Mar 1926 | 75 | | | TWO | (data point) |
| Mar 1926 | 80 | | | AO | (data point) |
| Dec 31, 1928 | 78.76 | Dec 31, 1929 | 97.5% | TWO | (summary) |
| Dec 31, 1928 | 95.13 | Dec 31, 1929 | 97.24 | AO | (summary) |
| Jun 10, 1929 | | Jul 10, 1929 | | TWO | 1 3/4 |
| Dec 19, 1929 | 95.42 | Feb 15, 1930 | | TWO | 1 3/4 |
| Dec 19, 1929 | 95.33 | Feb 15, 1930 | | AO | 3 |

On May 31, 1930, Tide Water Oil sold the subsidiary Tide Water Oil Export Corp to the Pan American Petroleum and Transport Company, a subsidiary of Standard Oil Company of Indiana.

Getty representative H. Paul Grimm (president of Pacific Western Oil Corporation) was elected director on May 3, 1934, succeeding Henry S. Sturgis.

After a board resolution on Sep 17, 1936, TWAO bought the stock of the Terrabella Investment Co (California) (Note: had interests in oil lands in Fresno and King counties and a 2.6797% interest (corresponding to an estimated 6,300,000 recoverable barrels) in the Kettleman North Dome Association) for 230,000 new TWAO shares, which brought the total common stock registered with the NYSE to 8,751,985 shares.

In August 1936 TWO (New Jersey) spun off all operations into the new wholly owned subsidiary TWO (Delaware) and on November 30, 1936, Tide Water Oil and Associated Oil were merged into the Tide Water Associated Oil Company, which then held 99.13% of TWO and 98.21% of AO stock. The no-par common stock was exchanged for $10 par common to reduce tax payments. Each residual TWO share not already in the TWAO treasury received 3 shares of TWAO stock; each AO share received 2 1/4, causing the issue of 149,698 new TWAO shares. The merger was likely among the many executed in response to the Revenue Act of 1936.

Tidewater Oil Company operated a fleet of oil tankers. During World War II, it chartered ships to the Maritime Commission and War Shipping Administration and operated T2 tankers to support the war effort. Ships included: USS Guyandot (AOG-16), SS Byron D. Benson, SS Samuel Q. Brown, Falls of Clyde, and others.

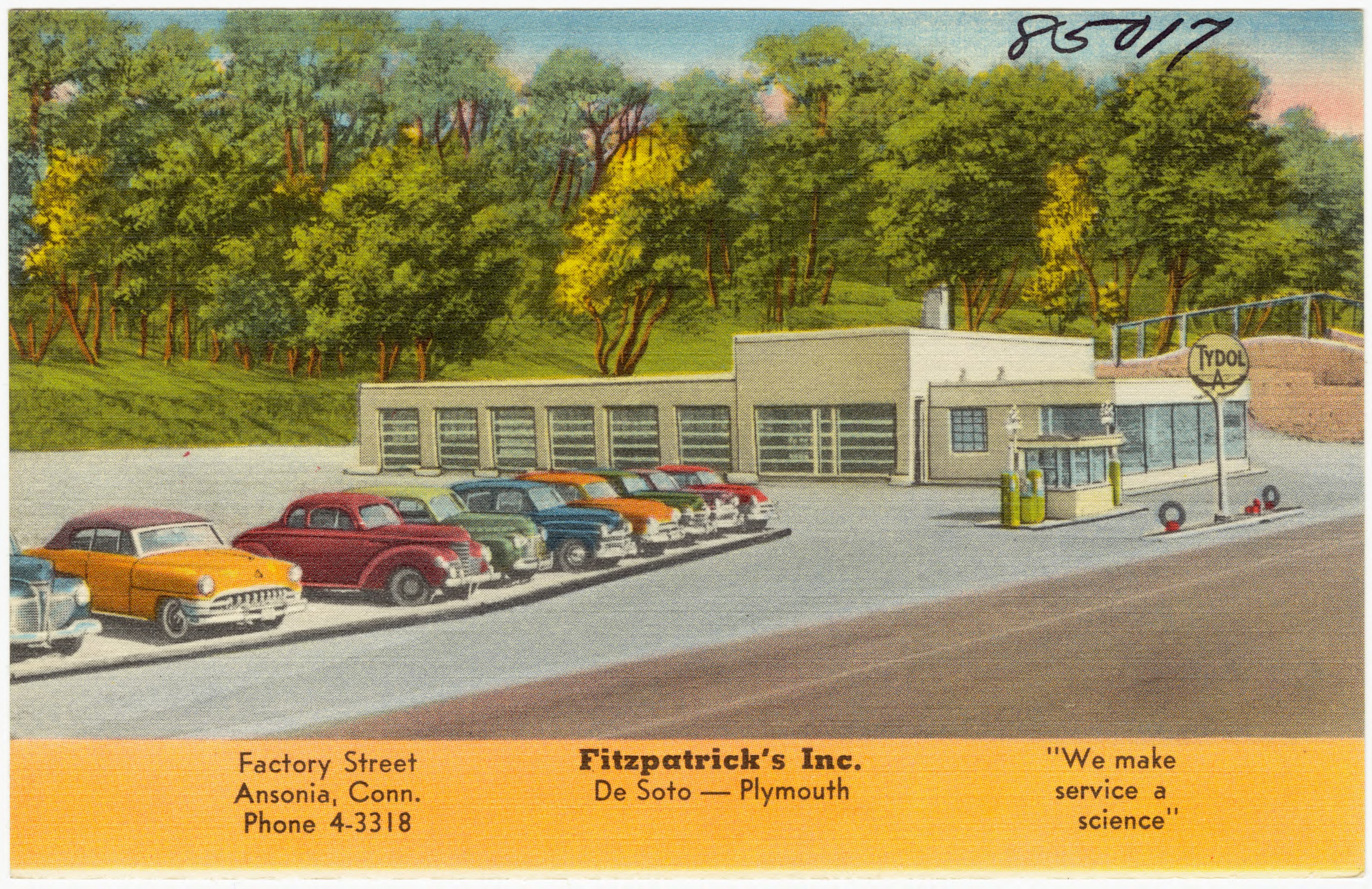
Automobile dealership featuring Tydol gasoline pumps, c. 1952

During the 1950s, the Associated and Tydol brands gradually fell into disuse, and were dropped entirely in 1956.

==== Mission Corp ====
Mission Corp was incorporated at the end of 1934 as a holding company as a means of Standard Oil of New Jersey to distribute its holding of TWAO stock. It had an authorized capital of 1,500,000 shares of which 1,050,000 were initially issued and on March 15, 1935 a stock dividend of 1/25 shares of Mission Corp was paid per share to holders of par $25 Jersey common stock. Mission Corp owned only a small amount of working cash and 1,128,123 shares of TWAO common stock. Directors were: Edward Shea, Robert McKelvy (both of TWAO) and Herbert Rawl, Lyman Rhoades and John P. Davis.

=== Tidewater Oil Company ===
On May 4, 1956, the name of the company was changed to Tidewater Oil Company; distribution continued under the Flying A and Veedol brand names.

In 1966, Phillips Petroleum Company (now ConocoPhillips) purchased Tidewater's western refining, distribution and retailing network. Phillips immediately rebranded all Flying A stations in the region to Phillips 66. On the East Coast that year, American-born British petrol-industrialist J. Paul Getty merged his oil interests into Getty Oil Company, and Tidewater Oil was dropped as a corporate brand. The Flying A brand continued to be used on the East Coast until 1970, when stations and products were renamed Getty.

In 2000, BP acquired the Veedol brand when it bought Burmah-Castrol. In February 2011, BP offered to sell the Veedol brand, which was purchased that October by Tide Water India, part of the Andrew Yule and Company Indian subsidiary.

Fortune 500 rankings
| Year | Revenue | | Profits | | Assets | |
| | $millions | Rank | $millions | Rank | $millions | Rank |
|---|---|---|---|---|---|---|
| 1955 | 459.0 | 63 | 34.5 | 48 | 395.9 | 60 |
| 1956 | 478.8 | 76 | 37.8 | 59 | 485.4 | 56 |
| 1957 | 522.6 | 75 | 38.0 | 66 | 679.6 | 38 |
| 1958 | 596.3 | 65 | 34.9 | 75 | 797.4 | 32 |
| 1959 | 552.9 | 62 | 2.6 | 403 | 810.7 | 35 |
1960
| 1961 | 583.1 | 73 | 35.1 | 71 | 897.8 | 37 |
1962
1963
1964
| 1965 | 675.0 | 88 | 48.7 | 69 | 1,005.7 | 43 |
| 1966 | 706.3 | 98 | 57.2 | 70 | 995.5 | 50 |

== Tanker fleet ==
Tankers built for Tide Water Oil
| Name | Type | Keel laid | Launched | Builder | Delivered | Notes |
Coastal
| Veedol | 1,800dwt 10kn | | Aug 18, 1920 | Staten Island SB Co. | | |
| Tydol | 252ft 10kn 1,885ton 2screw motor tank barge | Jan 3, 1927 | Apr 14, 1927 | Sun Shipbuilding | May 7, 1927 | |
| Tidewater; Tydol No. 2^{1930} | 225ft 10.5kn 2,300dwt | Jan 12, 1929 | Apr 23, 1929 | Pusey & Jones | Jul 1, 1929 | |
| Tidemotor | 188ft 6,000bbl tank barge | May 20, 1929 | Aug 6, 1929 | Sun Shipbuilding | Aug 17, 1929 | |
| Veedol No. 2 | 255ft 1,818grt 8kn | Oct 19, 1929 | Mar 4, 1930 | Pusey & Jones | May 15, 1930 | |
Oceangoing
| David McKelvy | 430ft 10.5kn 10,600dwt | Feb 23, 1921 | Jun 4, 1921 | Sun Shipbuilding | Jun 30, 1921 | |
| Robert E. Hopkins | 424ft 10.5kn 10,000dwt | Aug 30, 1920 | Aug 6, 1921 | Merchant Shipbuilding Corporation (Chester) | Oct 6, 1921 | 2 of 4 sister ships: Playa, Puente, Hopkins, Brown |
| Samuel Q. Brown | 424ft 10.5kn 10,000dwt | Oct 1, 1920 | Oct 15, 1921 | Merchant Shipbuilding Corporation (Chester) | Nov 5, 1921 | 2 of 4 sister ships: Playa, Puente, Hopkins, Brown |
| Byron D. Benson | 466ft 10.5kn 11,900dwt | Jun 29, 1920 | Sep 15, 1921 | Oscar Daniels (Tampa, FL) | | built for Standard Oil |
| Axtell J. Byles | 480ft 13.5kn 13,000dwt | Mar 1, 1927 | Jun 11, 1927 | Sun Shipbuilding | | |
| Tidewater | 13,450dwt | Jan 29, 1930 | Aug 9, 1930 | Sun Shipbuilding | Aug 16, 1930 | 2 of 2 sister ships |
| Tidewater Associated | 13,450dwt | Feb 12, 1930 | Sep 6, 1930 | Sun Shipbuilding | | 2 of 2 sister ships |
| Flying-A-New York | 200,000bbl | | Feb 1954 | Newport News Shipbuilding | | |
| Flying-A-Delaware | 200,000bbl | Dec 7, 1953 | May 3, 1954 | Newport News Shipbuilding | | |

Ships acquired from other companies
| Name | Type | Keel laid | Launched | Builder | Acquired as | Acquired from | Acquired when | Notes |
|---|---|---|---|---|---|---|---|---|
| William F. Humphrey | | Aug 27, 1920 | May 24, 1921 | Fore River | Agwibay | Agwi | 1927 | briefly named Axtell J Byles in 1927 |
| Edward L. Shea | 419ft 9,870dwt 10.75kn 74,187bbl | Feb 28, 1923 | Mar 20, 1924 | New York Shipbuilding | Priscilla | American Brown Boveri Electric Corp | Nov 1926 | |
| Byron D. Benson | T2 | | | | Glorieta | United States Maritime Commission | | |
| David McKelvy | T2 | | | | Groveton | United States Maritime Commission | | |
| Samuel Q. Brown | T2 | | | | Chesapeake Capes | United States Maritime Commission | 1947 | |
| William F. Humphrey | T2 | | | | Black Jack | United States Maritime Commission | | |
| Robert E. Hopkins | T2 | | | | Camp Charlotte | United States Maritime Commission | 1947 | |
| Frank Haskell | T2 | | | | Rich Mountain | United States Maritime Commission | 1947 | |

At the end of 1947 the company owned 15 ships (207.500 tons). These were in the Eastern Division:

- the 6 T-2 tankers
- Axtell J. Byles
- Edward L. Shea
- Mericos H. Whittier

and in the Western Division:

- Associated
- Frank G. Drum
- Solana
- Paul Shoup
- Tide Water
- Tide Water Associated

=== Trade routes ===
==== Veracruz - New York ====
Veracruz - the state, not the city.

All 4 tankers completed in 1921 had their commercial maiden voyage on the route and it was the only active trade route of the company until the fall of 1922. The round trip time was between 2 and 3 weeks, all 4 tankers had a speed of 10.5 knots. The distance is 2,029 nautical miles. Mexico was the second largest oil producer behind the United States from 1918 until 1926 and TWO was naturally not the only company to bring oil from Mexico to New York City, nor should it be assumed that all shipments on behalf of TWO were exclusively with their own tankers. Two deliveries to Boston are included in the summary, because the data is not totally consistent anyway.

Fleet activity: Mexico to New York (summary)
| | Departures | Barrels |
1921
| Sep | 1 | 68,550 |
| Oct | 3 | 207,192 |
| Nov | 5 | 344,899 |
| Dec | 5 | 352,833 |
1922
| Jan | 4 | 280,373 |
| Feb | 7 | 483,142 |
| Mar | 5 | 363,645 |
| Apr | 6 | 445,668 |
| May | 7 | 516,465 |
| Jun | 7 | 506,244 |
| Jul | 5 | 356,204 |
| Aug | 4 | 286,323 |

Fleet activity: Mexico to New York
| Ship | Departure | From | From company | Barrels | Notes |
1921
| McKelvy | Sep 14 | Port Lobos | Tide Mex Oil Co | 68,550 | |
| McKelvy | Oct 3 | Lobos | Tide-Mex | 70,492 | |
| Hopkins | Oct 16 | Lobos | Island Oil & Transport | 66,915 | |
| McKelvy | Oct 21 | Lobos | International Petr. Co. | 39,486 | |
| McKelvy | Oct 21 | Lobos | Tide Mex | 30,299 | |
| Hopkins | Nov 2 | Lobos | Tide Mex | 68,296 | |
| McKelvy | Nov 10 | Lobos | Island Oil & Transport | 31,606 | |
| McKelvy | Nov 11 | Lobos | Cortez Oil Corp | 38,818 | |
| Brown | Nov 12 | Lobos | Tide Mex | 68,920 | |
| Hopkins | Nov 21 | Tuxpan | Penn-Mex Fuel Co | 69,722 | |
| Brown | Nov 30 | Lobos | Tide Mex | 67,537 | |
| McKelvy | Dec 2 | Tuxpan | Penn-Mex | 71,920 | (Note: Dec 20 Brown to Boston) |
| Hopkins | Dec 11 | Lobos | Tide Mex | 69,972 | (Note: Dec 20 Brown to Boston) |
| Brown | Dec 20 | Lobos | Island Oil & Transport | 68,435 | (Note: Dec 20 Brown to Boston) |
| McKelvy | Dec 28 | Lobos | Tide Mex | 73,514 | (Note: Dec 20 Brown to Boston) |
| Hopkins | Dec 29 | Lobos | Tide Mex | 68,992 | (Note: Dec 20 Brown to Boston) |
1922
| Brown | Jan 9 | Lobos | Transcontinental | 69,203 | |
| McKelvy | Jan 15 | Lobos | Transcontinental | 72,110 | |
| Hopkins | Jan 16 | Lobos | Transcontinental | 68,992 | |
| Brown | Jan 29 | Lobos | Agwi | 70,068 | |
| Benson | Feb 1 | | | 81,058 | |
| McKelvy | Feb 2 | | | 72,699 | |
| Hopkins | Feb 7 | | | 69,397 | |
| Brown | Feb 17 | | | 38,234 | |
| McKelvy | Feb 22 | | | 71,282 | |
| Benson | Feb 23 | | | 80,449 | |
| Hopkins | Feb 26 | | | 70,023 | |
| Brown | Mar 6 | Lobos | Tide Mex | 70,073 | |
| McKelvy | Mar 14 | Lobos | Tide Mex | 73,060 | |
| Benson | Mar 15 | Lobos | Tide Mex | 81,031 | |
| Hopkins | Mar 16 | Lobos | Tide Mex | 69,626 | |
| Brown | Mar 25 | Lobos | Tide Mex | 69,855 | |
| McKelvy | Apr 2 | Lobos | Tide Mex | 73,129 | |
| Benson | Apr 3 | Lobos | Tide Mex | 80,824 | |
| Hopkins | Apr 4 | Lobos | Tide Mex | 68,073 | |
| Brown | Apr 12 | Lobos | Tide Mex | 70,414 | |
| Benson | Apr 21 | Lobos | Tide Mex | 80,840 | |
| McKelvy | Apr 24 | Lobos | Tide Mex | 72,388 | |
| Brown | May 3 | Lobos | Tide Mex | 70,032 | (Note: McKelvy May 14 to Boston) |
| Hopkins | May 5 | Lobos | Tide Mex | 69,646 | (Note: McKelvy May 14 to Boston) |
| Benson | May 10 | Lobos | Tide Mex | 80,814 | (Note: McKelvy May 14 to Boston) |
| McKelvy | May 14 | Lobos | Tide Mex | 70,886 | (Note: McKelvy May 14 to Boston) |
| Brown | May 21 | Lobos | Tide Mex | 69,874 | (Note: McKelvy May 14 to Boston) |
| Hopkins | May 22 | Lobos | Tide Mex | 69,638 | (Note: McKelvy May 14 to Boston) |
| Benson | May 30 | Lobos | Cortez Oil | 85,575 | (Note: McKelvy May 14 to Boston) |
| McKelvy | Jun 3 | Lobos | Tide Mex | 74,131 | |
| Brown | Jun 6 | Lobos | Tide Mex | 70,043 | |
| Hopkins | Jun 7 | Lobos | Tide Mex | 69,306 | |
| Benson | Jun 18 | Lobos | Tide Mex | 80,778 | |
| McKelvy | Jun 20 | Lobos | Cortez Oil Corp | 72,784 | |
| Brown | Jun 23 | Lobos | Tide Mex | 69,651 | |
| Hopkins | Jun 23 | Lobos | Tide Mex | 69,551 | |
| Benson | Jul 4 | | | 81,531 | |
| McKelvy | Jul 9 | | | 72,892 | |
| Brown | Jul 9 | | | 69,856 | |
| Hopkins | Jul 13 | | | 65,407 | |
| Brown | Jul 27 | | | 66,518 | |
| Hopkins | Aug 10 | Tampico | Continental Mexican Petr | 67,461 | |
| McKelvy | Aug 12 | Lobos | International Petr. Co | 72,259 | |
| Benson | Aug 20 | Lobos | International Petr. Co | 80,681 | |
| Brown | Aug 28 | Tampico | Freeport & Mexican Fuel Oil | 65,922 | |

==== California - New York ====
Round trip time was 5 to 6 weeks. The tankers brought only ballast water to Los Angeles.

Fleet activity: California to New York
| Ship | Departure | Barrels | Notes | Panama Canal | | |
| Ship | Departure | Barrels | Notes | A->P | P->A | Tons |
1922
| McKelvy | Nov | 80,000 | | Nov 6 | Nov 29 | 10,780 |
| Benson | Nov | 80,000 | | Oct 30 | Nov 24 | 12,000 |
| Brown | Nov | 75,000 | | Nov 8 | Dec 3 | 10,000 |
| Hopkins | | | | Nov 18 | Dec 12 | 10,205 |
| McKelvy | Dec/Jan | 80,000 | | Dec 17 | Jan 9 | 7,500 |
| Benson | Dec/Jan | 80,000 | | Dec 13 | Jan 8 | 11,430 |
| Brown | | | | Dec 21 | Jan 14 | 10,000 |

== See also ==
- Bayonne refinery strikes of 1915–1916

== Notes ==
Oil Production in ... (x1000 barrels)
| | Illinois | Oklahoma |
|---|---|---|
| <1900 | negligible | negligible |
| 1900 | negligible | 6 |
| 1901 | negligible | 10 |
| 1902 | negligible | 37 |
| 1903 | negligible | 139 |
| 1904 | negligible | 1,367 |
| 1905 | 181 | ? |
| 1906 | 4,397 | ? |
| 1907 | 24,282 | 43,524 |
| 1908 | 33,686 | 45,799 |
| 1909 | 30,898 | 47,859 |
| 1910 | 33,143 | 52,029 |
| 1911 | 31,317 | 56,069 |
| 1912 | 28,602 | 51,427 |
| 1913 | 23,894 | 63,579 |
| 1914 | 21,920 | 73,632 |
| 1915 | 19,042 | 97,915 |
| 1916 | 17,714 | 107.072 |
| 1917 | 15,777 | 107,508 |
| 1918 | 13,366 | 103,347 |
| 1919 | 11,960 | 86,911 |
| 1920 | 10,774 | 106,206 |
| 1921 | 10,043 | 114,634 |
| 1922 | 9,383 | 149,571 |
| 1923 | 8,707 | 160,929 |
| 1924 | 8,081 | 173,538 |
| 1925 | 7,863 | 176,768 |
| 1926 | 7,760 | 179,195 |
| 1927 | 6,994 | 277,775 |
| 1928 | 6,462 | 249,857 |
| 1929 | 6,319 | 255,004 |
| 1930 | 5,736 | 216,486 |
| 1931 | 5,039 | 180,574 |
| 1932 | 4,673 | 153,244 |
