= Neutrality Patrol =

US escort service to merchant ships, prior to US entry in WWII

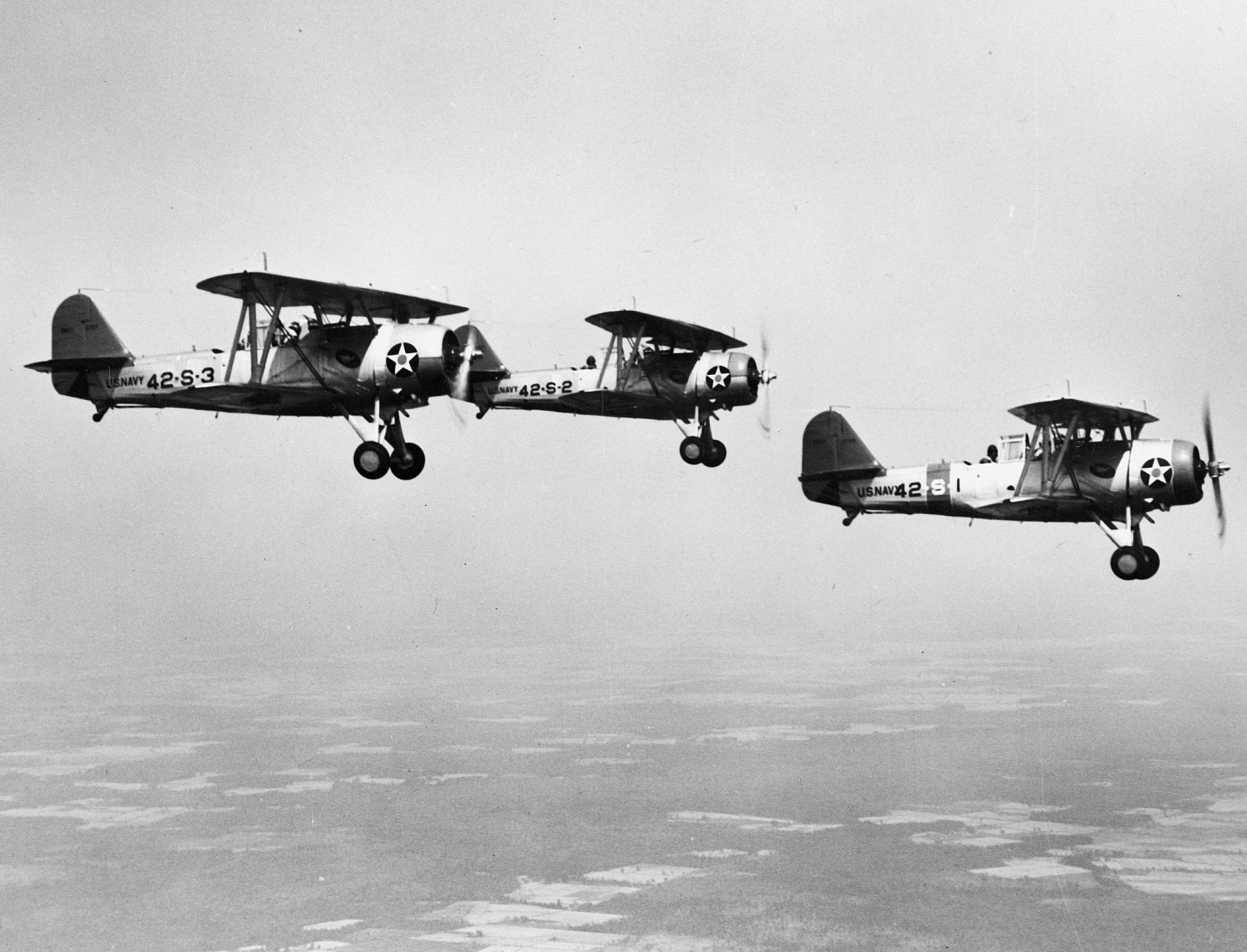
U.S. Navy Vought SBU-1 dive bombers of scouting squadron VS-42 flying the Neutrality Patrol in 1940⁹⁹

On September 3, 1939, the British and French declarations of war on Germany initiated the Battle of the Atlantic. The United States Navy Chief of Naval Operations (CNO) established a combined air and ship patrol of the United States Atlantic coast, including the Caribbean, on 4 September. President Franklin D. Roosevelt declared the United States' neutrality on 5 September, and declared the naval patrol a Neutrality Patrol. Roosevelt's initiation of the Neutrality Patrol, which in fact also escorted British ships, as well as orders to U.S. Navy destroyers first to actively report U-boats, then later "to shoot on sight", meant American neutrality was honored more in the breach than in the observance.

== Background ==
Upon declaration of war, the United Kingdom, France, and Germany attempted to restrict their adversaries' ability to import raw materials and manufactured goods. The belligerent navies were deployed to intercept ships capable of carrying such imports. Ships evading enemy naval patrols in the open ocean faced a final gauntlet nearing the European Atlantic coast where belligerent warships and patrolling aircraft congregated around the United Kingdom adjacent to Germany's oceanic trade routes. The United Kingdom and France controlled extensive overseas territories in 1939, while Germany had lost its colonial empire as war reparations in 1919. French and British empire seaports and airfields allowed Allied warships and aircraft to patrol around the world, while German warships controlled very few locations where they might safely refuel and resupply; German military aircraft operations were effectively limited to occupied territory. The United Kingdom and France had more warships than Germany; so German warships relied upon concealment, speed, or disguise to avoid destruction. U-boats were most numerous and active in European coastal areas, while a few German cruisers, battleships, and merchant raiders intercepted Allied shipping on ocean trade routes.

During World War I, outnumbered German warships had shifted patrol areas away from the United Kingdom into the Atlantic to disperse opposing Allied naval forces. After refueling at Newport, Rhode Island on 7 October 1916, U-53 sank five Allied merchant ships the following day in international waters off the coast of the United States. Although K/L Hans Rose scrupulously followed international law, the loss of American export cargoes incensed Americans as neutral United States Navy destroyers were obliged to stand aside while observing nearby merchant ships being sunk, and taking aboard seamen from the sunken ships.

== Neutrality Zone ==
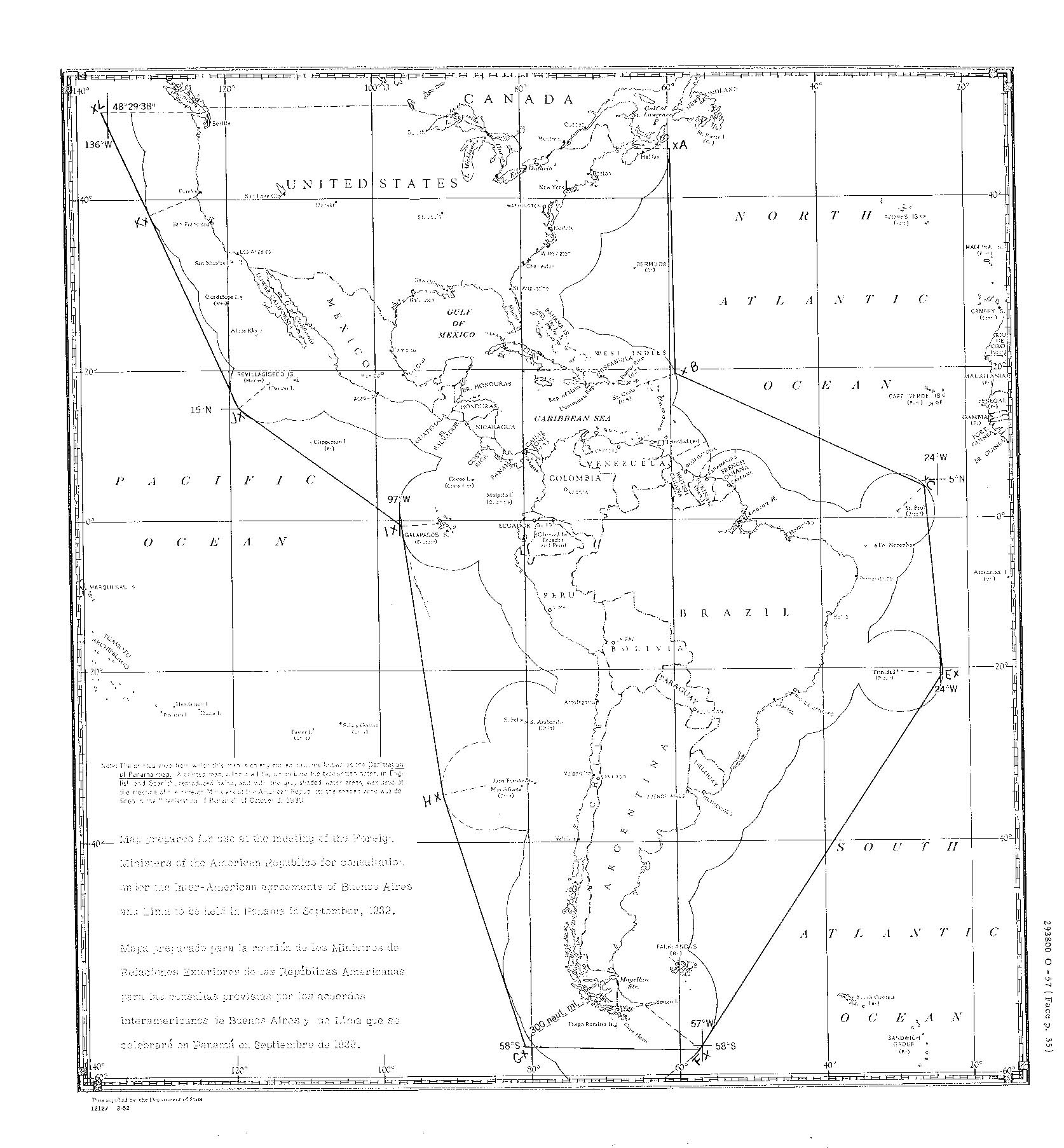
Map of the maritime security zone created by the Declaration of Panama in October 1939, based on straight lines between points about 300 nautical miles offshore.

On 4 September 1939, the Chief of Naval Operations (CNO) ordered the Atlantic Squadron to establish a combined air and ship patrol to observe and report the movements of ships of warring nations within a line extending east from Boston to 65 degrees west and thence south to the 19th parallel and seaward around the Leeward and Windward Islands. The concept of a naval Neutrality Patrol within that zone was presented to a Conference of Foreign Ministers of the American Republics convened in Panama on 25 September. After considerable debate, the conference agreed the Declaration of Panama on 2 October 1939, to extend the neutrality zone southwesterly parallel to the northeastern coast of South America approximately 300 miles (480 km) offshore.

The initial CNO orders of September 4 directed the patrols to report the movements of ships of warring nations in cipher. U.S. Navy ships were instructed to avoid making any report while in the vicinity of such ships to avoid performance of unneutral radio direction finding service or the impression that an unneutral service was being performed. However, on October 9, after discussion about delays in the process, President Roosevelt instructed the navy to transmit reports promptly in plain English; and the Neutrality Patrol began to do so on October 20.

The reporting of vessels by US forces gave a benefit to the British. While the Germans, operating out of European bases, could take little advantage of information on shipping in the Americas, the Royal Navy had far greater access to the Atlantic and could send vessels from the UK, Canada or its overseas possessions to intercept.

== Organization ==
Battleships USS Arkansas, Texas, and New York with the aircraft carrier USS Ranger (with aircraft squadrons VB-4, VF-4, VS-41, and VS-42 embarked) formed a reserve force at Hampton Roads to support the following patrols:

- Patrol Zero: Destroyer division 18 of USS Davis, Jouett, Benham, and Ellet were assigned patrol station zero from Newfoundland south to the 40th parallel.
- Patrol One: Destroyers USS Hamilton and Leary were assigned patrol station one along a northwest-southeast line off Georges Bank.
- Patrol Two: Destroyers USS Hopkins and Goff, with aircraft of patrol squadron VP-54 and seaplane tender USS Owl, operated from Newport, Rhode Island, between the 38th and 43rd parallels.
- Patrol Three: Destroyers USS Manley, Barry, Decatur, and Reuben James patrolled between the 34th and 38th parallels with aircraft of VP-52 and VP-53.
- Patrol Six: Destroyers USS Babbitt and Claxton patrolled the Florida Strait and Yucatán Channel.
- Patrols Seven and Eight: Cruisers USS San Francisco and Tuscaloosa with destroyers USS Broome, Borie, Simpson, and Truxton patrolled the eastern Caribbean south of the 23rd parallel with aircraft of VP-33 and VP-51 supported by seaplane tenders USS Lapwing, Gannet, and Thrush. Gannet and Thrush established a seaplane base in Puerto Rico.
- Patrol Nine: Cruisers USS Quincy and Vincennes patrolled within 300 miles (480 km) of the coast between Newport and Cape Hatteras.

== New bases ==
Neutrality Patrols began operating from Bermuda following the Destroyers for Bases Agreement. The base was commissioned on April 7, 1941; and Carrier Division 3 (USS Ranger, Wasp, and Yorktown) began using the base the following day. By mid-June cruisers USS Memphis, Milwaukee, Cincinnati and Omaha were patrolling from Trinidad south along the coast of Brazil.

== Convoy escort ==
At the beginning of 1941, President Roosevelt secretly organized a protection-of-shipping task force 24, given the designation of Support Force, United States Atlantic Fleet, under the command of Rear Admiral Arthur L. Bristol. Ships, planes, funding, and personnel were assigned in January and February, and operations began in March. Admiral Bristol remained in Washington, but material for the various bases was assembled and shipped from Naval Air Station Quonset Point. Admiral Bristol insisted that all records be destroyed when an operation was completed. His staff believed he was following Presidential instructions to avoid revealing operations which might not have public-opinion approval. Efforts to document Support Force operations after the war were discouraged to avoid damaging world opinion as to the integrity of United States' neutrality.

To augment the fleet units already engaged in the Neutrality Patrol which President Roosevelt had placed around the eastern seaboard and Gulf ports, the United States Navy recommissioned 77 destroyers and light minelayers which had lain in reserve at either Philadelphia or San Diego. In Newfoundland on August 9, 1941, President Roosevelt agreed to provide American destroyers as escorts for the Canada to Iceland portion of HX convoys and westbound ON convoys. USS Greer ineffectively engaged U-652 on September 4; and on September 11 President Roosevelt declared Axis ships entered the neutrality zone at their own risk, and ordered the U.S. Navy to attack any vessel threatening ships under American escort. HX 150 sailed September 16, 1941, as the first convoy with American escort. ON 18 sailed September 24 as the first westbound convoy with American escort. The Gleaves-class destroyer Kearny was torpedoed while escorting Convoy SC 48 on October 17, 1941. The destroyer Reuben James was torpedoed and sunk on October 31, 1941, while escorting Convoy HX 156 with a loss of 100 lives.

== Results ==
The Neutrality Patrol was a major focus of one of the world's largest navies for the first third of the Second World War. The Atlantic Squadron in that period consisted of three battleships, four heavy cruisers, 29 destroyers, and one aircraft carrier; and their primary mission was confirmed by its being redesignated the Patrol Squadron on 1 November 1940. The Neutrality Patrol enhanced effectiveness of Allied patrols within the declared neutrality zone. On 12 July 1940, Assistant CNO Robert L. Ghormley was ordered to Britain to standardize shipboard communications between British and American warships.

The Royal Navy destroyer HMS Hyperion intercepted the German liner Columbus off Bermuda on December 19 after six days of radioed position reports by three relays of Neutrality Patrol destroyers shadowing the liner since it departed Veracruz. Roosevelt ordered all reports of the incident should indicate Hyperion encountered Columbus by chance. The Neutrality Patrol similarly radioed position reports of the British RFA tanker Patella a few days later, reasonably confident there were no German ships in position to intercept. The German freighter Konsul Horn left Aruba on January 7, 1940, posing as a Soviet ship to avoid identification by the Neutrality Patrol. The German freighter Helgoland sailed from Colombia on October 24, 1940, and evaded pursuit attempts by Neutrality Patrol destroyers. The German freighter Rio Grande similarly evaded the Neutrality Patrol by sailing from Rio de Janeiro on October 31; but USS Plunkett prevented German ships Orinoco and Phrygia from leaving Tampico, Mexico on November 15.

For each incident of the neutrality patrol reporting a British ship in the Gulf of Mexico, several German ships were intercepted by Royal Navy units responding to the American reports. Of the 211 German merchant ships attempting return to Germany during the last four months of 1939, only 32 (37%) of the 85 ships leaving the western hemisphere through the declared neutrality zone were successful, while 100 (80%) of the 126 leaving other parts of the world successfully evaded Allied interception.
