= K147 =

K147 or K-147 may refer to:

- K-147 (Kansas highway), a state highway in Kansas
- HMCS Baddeck (K147)
