= K63 =

K63 or K-63 may refer to:

- K-63 (Kansas highway), a state highway in Kansas
- HMS Picotee (K63), a UK Royal Navy ship
