= USS Decatur (DD-341) =

Clemson-class destroyer

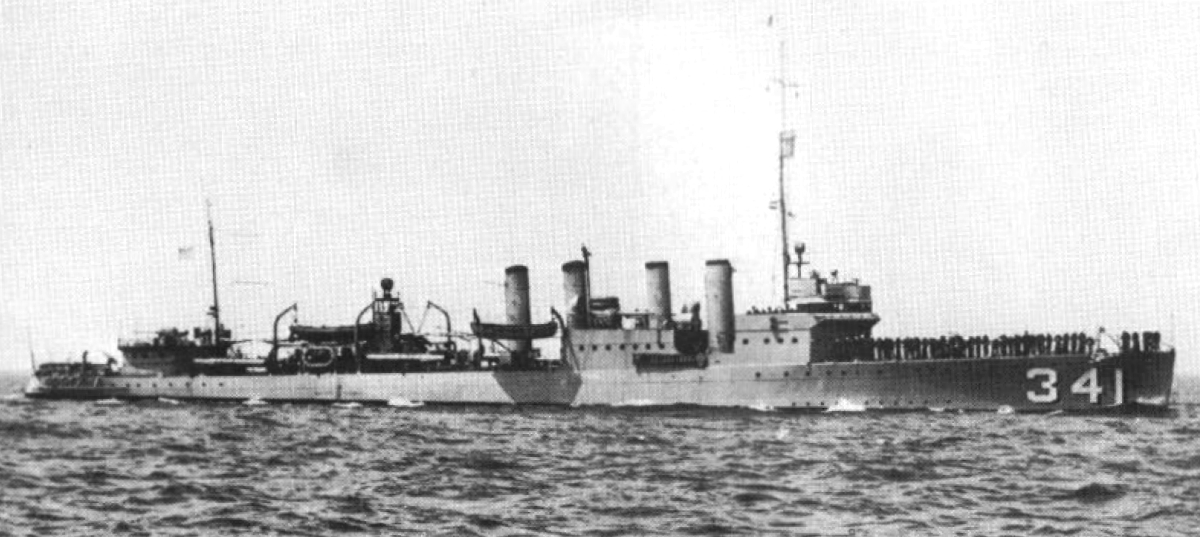
- USS Decatur (DD-341) underway before World War II

History

United States
- Builder: Mare Island Naval Shipyard
- Laid down: 15 September 1920
- Launched: 29 October 1921
- Commissioned: 9 August 1922
- Decommissioned: 28 July 1945
- Stricken: 13 August 1945
- Fate: Sold for scrap, 30 November 1945

General characteristics
- Class & type: Clemson-class destroyer
- Displacement: 1,215 tons
- Length: 314 ft 5 in (95.83 m)
- Beam: 31 ft 9 in (9.68 m)
- Draft: 9 ft 10 in (3 m)
- Propulsion: 26,500 shp (20 MW); geared turbines, 2 screws
- Speed: 35 knots (65 km/h)
- Range: 4,900 nmi (9,100 km); @ 15 kt
- Boats & landing craft carried: 4 LCP landing craft
- Complement: 114 officers and enlisted
- Armament: 4 × 4 in (100 mm) guns, 3 × 3 in (76 mm) gun, 12 × 21-inch (533 mm) torpedo tubes.

The third USS Decatur (DD-341) was a Clemson-class destroyer in the United States Navy following World War I. She was named for Stephen Decatur.

== History ==
The third Decatur (DD-341) was launched 29 October 1921 by Mare Island Navy Yard; sponsored by Mrs. J. S. McKean; and commissioned 9 August 1922.

After completing her trials Decatur sailed to San Diego where she was placed out of commission 17 January 1923. She was recommissioned 26 September 1923 and became flagship of Destroyer Squadron 11, Battle Fleet. Until 1937 she operated along the western seaboard, and in Caribbean and Hawaiian waters. From April to September 1925 she cruised to Samoa, New Zealand, and Australia, and in April 1926 made an extensive survey of the Mexican coast. She embarked Secretary of the Navy C. D. Wilbur at Bremerton, Wash., 28 July 1926 and cruised for official visits at Alaskan ports, returning to Bremerton 6 August. She transported the Haitian Commission to Santiago, Cuba, arriving 14 March 1930, then visited New York and Chesapeake Bay for the Presidential Fleet Review of 19 May before returning to the west coast in June.

Decatur arrived at Norfolk 22 February 1937 for duty with the Training Detachment of the U.S. Fleet. She escorted President F. D. Roosevelt in Potomac to New Orleans and Texas, then served in Midshipman and Naval Reserve training cruises and on Neutrality patrol along the eastern seaboard to Cuba until September 1941.

== World War II ==
Arriving at Argentia, Newfoundland, 14 September 1941, Decatur served on convoy escort and patrol to ports in Iceland until returning to Boston 17 May 1942. From 4 June to 25 August she operated on convoy duty between Norfolk and Key West, then between New York and Guantanamo Bay from 30 August to 13 October. Until 14 January 1943 she escorted ships out to sea and to Boston from New York, then departed 11 February for the Mediterranean sailing by way of and returning to Aruba, Netherlands West Indies. She made four more voyages from New York and Aruba to the Mediterranean until 1 October.

Decatur joined the task group centered about USS Card and sailed from Norfolk 24 November 1943 for an antisubmarine sweep, returning to New York 3 January 1944. From 26 January to 17 February she escorted a convoy to Panama, returning with another to Hampton Roads. On 13 March she cleared Norfolk as flagship of Task Force 64, escorting a large convoy to Bizerte, Tunisia. On the last day of March while sailing between Oran and Algiers, the force successfully repelled a coordinated strike of German submarines and planes, to arrive at its destination 3 April. Eight days later Decatur was en route to the United States, arriving at Boston 2 May, for brief overhaul and refresher training.

== Fate ==
Arriving at Norfolk 2 July 1944 Decatur sailed from this port on escort and training duty in the Caribbean Sea until the last day of June 1945 when she entered Philadelphia Naval Shipyard for inactivation. She was decommissioned there 28 July 1945 and sold 30 November 1945. Her anchor is on display at the Freedom Park.

== Cruises ==
- April - September 1925 - cruised to Samoa, New Zealand, and Australia
- April 1926 - Surveyed Mexican coast
- 28 July 1926 - Embarked Secretary of the Navy Curtis D. Wilbur at Bremerton, Washington, began official visits to Alaskan ports, returning to Bremerton 6 August 1926
- 14 March 1930 - Arrived in Santiago, Cuba, transporting the Haitian Commission; visited New York and Chesapeake Bay for the Presidential Fleet Review, 19 May
- June 1930 - Returned to West Coast
- 22 February 1937 Arrived at Norfolk for duty with US Fleet Training Detachment; escorted President Franklin Delano Roosevelt in Potomac to New Orleans and Texas; served in Midshipman and Naval Reserve training cruises and on Neutrality Patrol along the Eastern Seaboard to Cuba until September 1941
- 14 September 1941 - Arrived at NS Argentia, Newfoundland, served as convoy escort and patrol to ports in Iceland; returned to Boston 17 May 1942
- 4 June – 25 August 1942 - Operated on convoy duty between Norfolk and Key West
- 30 August – 13 October 1942 - Operated on convoy duty between New York and Guantanamo Bay; until 14 January 1943 escorted ships out to sea and to Boston from New York
- 11 February 1943 - Departed for the Mediterranean sailing by way of and returning to Aruba, Netherlands West Indies; made four more voyages from New York and Aruba to the Mediterranean until 1 October
- 24 November 1943 - Sailed from Norfolk in task group centered about Card for an antisubmarine sweep; returned to New York 3 January 1944.
- 26 January – 17 February 1944 - escorted a convoy to Panama, returning with another to Hampton Roads.
- 13 March 1944 - Left Norfolk as flagship of TF 64, escorting a large convoy to Bizerte, Tunisia; March while sailing between Oran and Algiers, the force successfully repelled a coordinated strike of German submarines and planes on 30 March to arrive at its destination 3 April;
- 11 April – 2 May 1944 - Cruised from Bizerte to Boston for brief overhaul and refresher training
- 2 July 1944 - Arrived at Norfolk for escort and training duty in the Caribbean Sea
- 30 June 1945 - Entered Philadelphia Naval Shipyard for inactivation

== Convoys escorted ==
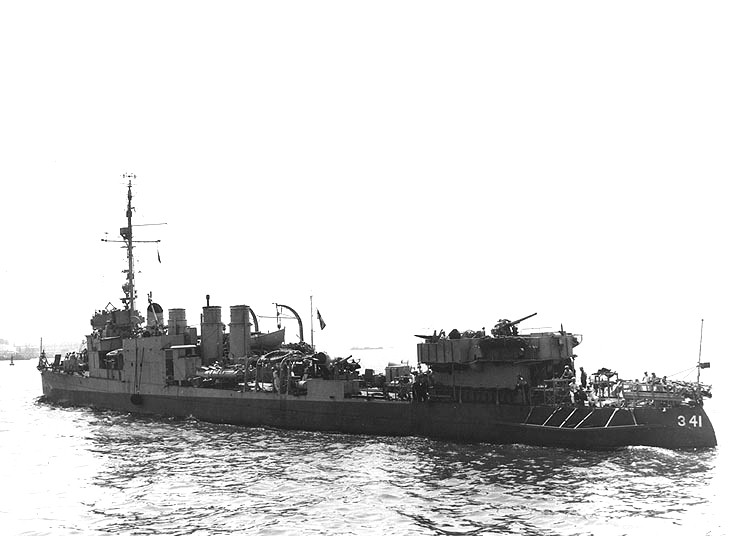
USS Decatur in 1943.

Convoy	Escort Group	Dates	Notes
HX 151		24 Sept – 1 Oct 1941	from Newfoundland to Iceland prior to US declaration of war
ON 24		13-15 Oct 1941	from Iceland to Newfoundland prior to US declaration of war
SC 48		16-17 Oct 1941	battle reinforcement prior to US declaration of war
HX 159		10-19 Nov 1941	from Newfoundland to Iceland prior to US declaration of war
ON 39		29 Nov – 4 Dec 1941	from Iceland to Newfoundland prior to US declaration of war
HX 166		21-31 Dec 1941	from Newfoundland to Iceland
ON 53		9-19 Jan 1942	from Iceland to Newfoundland
HX 173		3-10 Feb 1942	from Newfoundland to Iceland
HX 175		15-23 Feb 1942	from Newfoundland to Iceland
SC 77		11–14 April 1942	from Newfoundland to Iceland
ON 86	MOEF group A4	15–17 April 1942	from Iceland to Newfoundland
ON 91	MOEF group A2	1–5 May 1942	from Iceland to Newfoundland

== Honors ==
She received two battle stars for World War II service, and was sold for scrap 30 November 1945.
