= USS Mason (DD-191) =

Clemson-class destroyer

Coordinates: 57°1′N 19°8′W

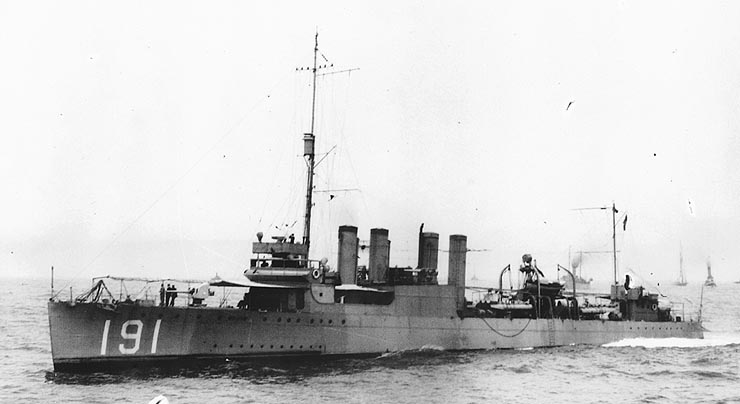
- USS Mason (DD-191)

History

United States
- Name: USS Mason
- Namesake: John Y. Mason
- Builder: Newport News Shipbuilding & Dry Dock Company
- Laid down: 10 July 1918
- Launched: 8 March 1919
- Commissioned: 28 February 1920
- Decommissioned: 3 July 1922
- Recommissioned: 4 December 1939
- Decommissioned: 8 October 1940
- Stricken: 8 January 1941
- Identification: DD-191
- Fate: Transferred to United Kingdom 9 October 1940

United Kingdom
- Name: HMS Broadwater
- Acquired: 9 October 1940
- Commissioned: 9 October 1940
- Identification: Pennant number: H81
- Fate: Torpedoed and sunk, 18 October 1941

General characteristics
- Class & type: Clemson-class destroyer
- Displacement: 1,190 tons
- Length: 314 ft 5 in (95.83 m)
- Beam: 31 ft 9 in (9.68 m)
- Draft: 9 ft 3 in (2.82 m)
- Propulsion: 26,500 shp (19,800 kW); geared turbines, 2 screws
- Speed: 35 kn (65 km/h; 40 mph)
- Range: 4,900 nmi (9,100 km; 5,600 mi) at 15 kn (28 km/h; 17 mph)
- Complement: 101 officers and enlisted
- Armament: 4 × 4 in (100 mm)/50 cal. guns, 3 × 3 in (76 mm)/23 cal. guns, 12 × 21 inch (533 mm) torpedo tubes

USS Mason (DD-191) was a Clemson-class destroyer in the United States Navy during World War II. She was later transferred to the Royal Navy as HMS Broadwater (H81).

== As USS Mason ==
The first Navy ship named for Secretary of the Navy John Y. Mason (1799–1859), Mason was laid down by Newport News Shipbuilding & Dry Dock Company, Newport News, Virginia on 10 July 1918. The ship was launched 8 March 1919; sponsored by Miss Mary Mason Williams, great-granddaughter of Secretary Mason. Mason was commissioned at Norfolk Navy Yard 28 February 1920, with Lieutenant Carl F. Holden temporarily in command until 8 March.

On 17 July Mason was designated DD-191. After shakedown off Norfolk, Virginia, she operated along the east coast for the next 2 years until she sailed for Philadelphia. As a result of the Washington Naval Treaty of 6 February 1922 limiting naval armament, the destroyer was decommissioned at the Philadelphia Navy Yard 3 July 1922.

== As HMS Broadwater ==
After World War II broke out in Europe, Mason recommissioned 4 December 1939. Under terms of the Destroyers for Bases Agreement of 2 September 1940, she became one of 50 overage ships of this class turned over to United Kingdom in exchange for 99-year leases on strategic bases in the Western Hemisphere. Mason arrived at Halifax, Nova Scotia, 2 October; decommissioned 8 October 1940; and was transferred to the British Royal Navy as HMS Broadwater with the pennant number H81 the next day.

On 15 October she departed Halifax for the British Isles, via St. John's, Newfoundland, arriving in the River Clyde, Scotland, on the 26th for service with the 11th Escort Group, Western Approaches Command. During the early part of 1941 the Broadwater escorted convoys, carrying troops and military supplies, around the Cape of Good Hope to the Middle East. She spent May and June at Southampton, England.

Assigned to the Newfoundland Escort Force in July, the ship patrolled the North Atlantic and guarded convoys against the German submarine "wolfpacks" into the fall of that year. Detached from escorting Convoy TC 14, early in the morning of 17 October she attacked a U-boat, one of a pack assaulting the eastbound Convoy SC 48 some 400 miles (640 km) south of Iceland. That night Broadwater was hit by torpedoes of U-101 and sank at 13:40 on 18 October. Four officers and forty crew lost their lives including Lt. John Stanley Parker RNVR, the first American to die in action whilst serving under the White Ensign. Broadwater's bell and ship's documents were presented to the people of Broadwater, Nebraska by the British government after the end of World War II. They can be viewed at the Broadwater Public Library and City Museum.

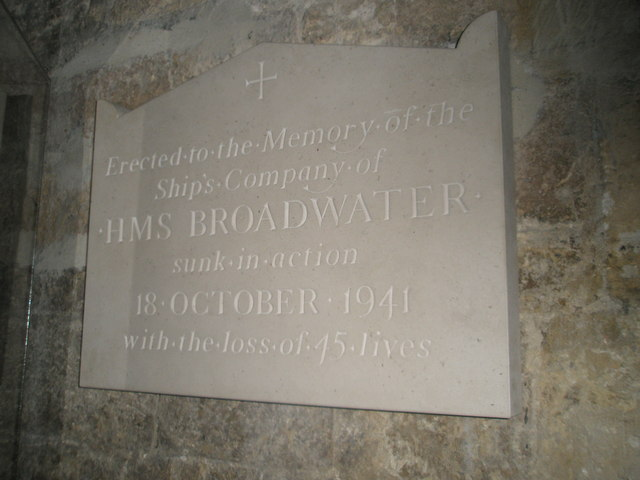
Memorial within St Michael's Chapel at Chichester Cathedral dedicated to the memory of HMS Broadwater's ship's company
