= USS Plunkett =

Gleaves-class destroyer

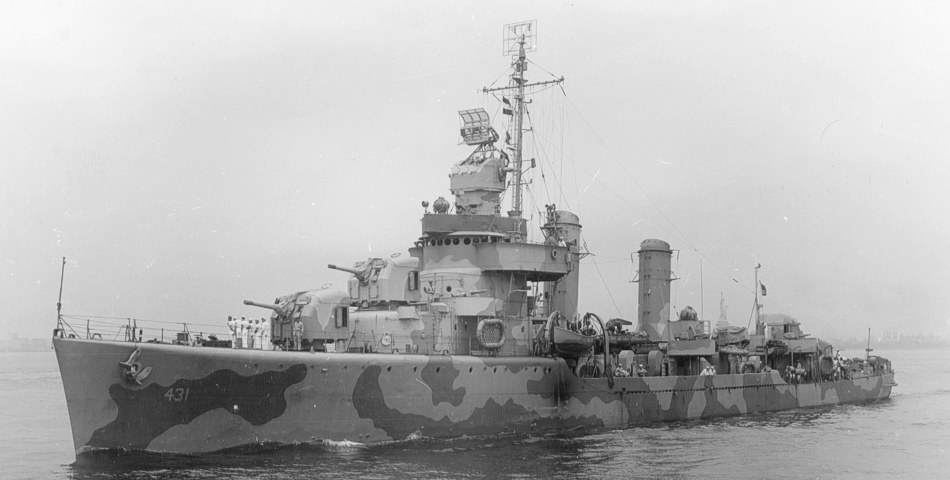
- USS Plunkett (DD-431)

History

United States
- Name: USS Plunkett
- Namesake: Charles Peshall Plunkett
- Builder: Federal Shipbuilding and Drydock Company
- Laid down: 1 March 1939
- Launched: 7 March 1940
- Commissioned: 17 July 1940
- Decommissioned: 3 May 1946
- Identification: Callsign: NUBF
- Fate: To Taiwan, 16 February 1959
- Stricken: 1 November 1972
- Identification: DD-431

Taiwan
- Name: ROCS Nan Yang
- Acquired: 16 February 1959
- Stricken: 1975
- Identification: DD-17
- Fate: Scrapped in 1975

General characteristics
- Class & type: Gleaves-class destroyer
- Displacement: 1,630 tons
- Length: 348 ft 3 in (106.15 m)
- Beam: 36 ft 1 in (11.00 m)
- Draft: 11 ft 10 in (3.61 m)
- Propulsion: 50,000 shp (37,000 kW); 4 boilers; 2 propellers
- Speed: 37.4 knots (69 km/h)
- Range: 6,500 nmi (12,000 km; 7,500 mi) at 12 kn (22 km/h; 14 mph)
- Complement: 16 officers, 260 enlisted
- Armament: 5 × 5 in (127 mm) DP guns, 6 × .50 cal (12.7 mm) guns, 6 × 20 mm AA guns, 10 × 21 in (533 mm) torpedo tubes, 2 × depth charge tracks

USS Plunkett (DD-431), a Gleaves-class destroyer, is the only ship of the United States Navy to be named for Rear Admiral Charles Peshall Plunkett.

Plunkett was laid down on 1 March 1939 by the Federal Shipbuilding and Dry Dock Co., Kearny, New Jersey and launched on 7 March 1940, sponsored by Mrs. Charles P. Plunkett, widow of Rear Admiral Plunkett. The ship was commissioned on 17 July 1940.

== Service history ==
=== Atlantic service ===
Prior to 7 December 1941, Plunkett operated in the Western Atlantic and in the Gulf of Mexico–Caribbean area on Neutrality Patrol. Initially in the latter area, she joined other Neutrality Patrol vessels off Tampico to prevent the departure of several German steamers, then cruised off Martinique, French Antilles to prevent the dispatching of warships, equipment, and gold to the Vichy government. Patrol and convoy missions in the North Atlantic followed, and, on 7 December 1941, she was en route from Reykjavík to Argentia.

Plunkett continued such duty until joining Task Force 39 (TF 39) on 20 March 1942. Six days later she departed the east coast for Scapa Flow and arrived in Orkney on 4 April to commence operations with the British Home Fleet. Employed on North Sea patrols and escort work over the first leg of the Murmansk run, she was relieved, by Mayrant, in mid-May and assigned to escort the battleship New York back to the United States. Coastwise and Caribbean escort duty followed and in August she returned to the North Atlantic to accompany UK-bound convoys. On 2 November, she departed New York on her first escort run to North Africa. Delayed en route to allow time for the clearance of wreckage from her port of destination, her group delivered its charges with their reinforcement troops and equipment to Casablanca on the 18th. Then, after patrolling off the Moroccan coast she returned to New York and local operations off southern New England.

Another transatlantic convoy to Casablanca preceded shore bombardment exercises in Chesapeake Bay, after which she escorted coastal convoys until May, 1943. On the 10th she sailed for Oran, Algeria, with TF 60; and, between the end of May and July, she was employed on hunter-killer (HUK), antisubmarine (ASW), and convoy escort assignments in North African waters.

On 6 July, she cleared Mers-el-Kebir as a unit of the Western Task Force for the Allied invasion of Sicily. During the invasion, she screened the merchant ships and minelayers of Task Group 80.5 (TG 80.5), then patrolled off the Gela anchorage and covered minelaying operations. On 12 July, she departed the assault area, returning on 17 July, to Scoglitti, and on 31 July, to Palermo, with convoys. During August, she participated in numerous landings on the Sicilian coast and, in September, joined TG 81.6 to screen the troop transports and landing craft for the assault on the Axis boot at Salerno. Early on the morning of 13 September, she aided bombed and burning British hospital ship HMHS Newfoundland. The struggle to save the ship continued for over 36 hours, but, in the evening of 14 September, Plunkett, on orders, fired on and sank the hulk.

North Africa–Naples convoys, interspersed with fire support missions, continued until 21 January 1944, when she sailed to escort the follow-up assault group to Cape Anzio. After delivering the craft, she remained in the area to screen the transports. On 24 January she fell victim to one of the numerous air attacks which, previously, she had helped to drive off. At 17:38 condition red was sounded. A few minutes later the attack was launched with two glider bombs coming in on the port beam, and two Ju 88s closing in from up ahead. Speed was increased; maneuvering was radical. The glider bombs finally dropped, at 200 yards (180 m) distance, but more planes had joined the foray to commence a sustained 17 minute battle. It ended at 17:57 as Plunkett took a 250 kg (550 lb) bomb and caught fire. The bomb killed 23, left 30 missing, with as many, and more, wounded, and caused extensive damage to her fire control apparatus, armament, and port engine. By 18:21, all fires were out and the destroyer proceeded, on one engine, to Palermo. Temporary repairs enabled her to reach Casablanca and, finally, New York, where repairs were completed.

On 5 May 1944, she again departed New York for European waters. Arriving at Belfast on 14 May, she remained until 3 June, then sailed toward the English Channel to join the armada staging for the invasion of France. On 6 June, she screened the transports off Omaha Beach. Fire support and patrol duties followed until 9 June, when she sailed back to England. Returning to the French coast a few days later, she added shore bombardment to her duties at the Bombardment of Cherbourg in Task Force 129.

On 13 June Plunkett was involved in a 'friendly fire' incident; she attacked the British cable laying ship HMTS Monarch and its Canadian escort, the Canadian corvette HMCS Trentonian, killing Monarch's first mate and a seaman and wounding most of the bridge personnel. More than thirty were wounded, including the ship's Master. Trentonian, though fired upon, was not hit and rescued survivors in the water and treated wounded. Monarch was severely damaged and the cable was cut and lost disrupting installation of critical communications cables to Normandy.

In July, Plunkett returned to the Mediterranean to prepare for another assault landing, and on 13 August, she sailed from Naples to support Operation Dragoon, the invasion of southern France. During that operation she carried officials to and from the beaches in addition to performing her screening duties. She next added fire support and shore bombardment off St. Tropez, Port de Bouc, and Marseille to her mission, and continued those duties, particularly on the Italian-French border, until 23 November. She then sailed for Oran, whence she escorted a convoy back to the United States, arriving at New York, 16 January 1945.

=== Convoys escorted ===
Convoy	Escort Group	Dates	Notes
	Task force 19	1–7 July 1941	occupation of Iceland prior to US declaration of war
HX 151		24 Sept-1 Oct 1941	from Newfoundland to Iceland prior to US declaration of war
ON 24		13-15 Oct 1941	from Iceland to Newfoundland prior to US declaration of war
SC 48		16-17 Oct 1941	battle reinforcement prior to US declaration of war
HX 159		10-19 Nov 1941	from Newfoundland to Iceland prior to US declaration of war
ON 39		11 Nov-4 Dec 1941	from Iceland to Newfoundland prior to US declaration of war
HX 166		24-31 Dec 1941	from Newfoundland to Iceland
ON 53		9-19 Jan 1942	from Iceland to Newfoundland
HX 174		9-17 Feb 1942	from Newfoundland to Iceland
ON 69		25 Feb-1 March 1942	from Iceland to Newfoundland
ON 92		16–17 May 1942	from Iceland to Newfoundland
AT 18		6-17 Aug 1942	troopships from New York City to Firth of Clyde

=== Pacific service ===
Plunkett engaged in training exercises, ASW patrols, and experimental testing until early May, when she resumed transatlantic escort work. The war in Europe ended before she reached the UK, but hostilities in the Pacific still raged. On 27 May she returned to the east coast, underwent extensive alterations and refresher training, and got underway for the Pacific 6 August. She transited the Panama Canal on 13 August and was en route to San Diego the day the war ended. In September she escorted occupation forces from the U.S. to Japan; then, in October and November, assisted in ferrying more from the Philippines. Later in November, she sailed northeast to the Aleutians, where she operated until ordered back to the east coast for inactivation.

Plunkett earned five battle stars during the Second World War.

=== ROC Navy service ===
Plunkett decommissioned 3 May 1946 and was berthed at Charleston, South Carolina as a unit of the Atlantic Reserve Fleet. She remained there until reactivated and transferred, under the loan provisions of the Military Assistance Program, to the Nationalist Chinese government, 16 February 1959.

Renamed ROCS Nan Yang (DD-17), she served in the Republic of China Navy until 1975, when she was stricken from the Navy list and scrapped. Her name and pennant number were reassigned to the ex-USS John W. Thomason, an Allen M. Sumner-class destroyer acquired in May 1974.
