= German submarine U-568 =

German World War II submarine

History

Nazi Germany
- Name: U-568
- Ordered: 24 October 1939
- Builder: Blohm & Voss, Hamburg
- Yard number: 544
- Laid down: 27 April 1940
- Launched: 6 March 1941
- Commissioned: 1 May 1941
- Fate: Sunk on 28 May 1942

General characteristics
- Class & type: Type VIIC submarine
- Displacement: 769 tonnes (757 long tons) surfaced; 871 t (857 long tons) submerged
- Length: 67.10 m (220 ft 2 in) o/a; 50.50 m (165 ft 8 in) pressure hull
- Beam: 6.20 m (20 ft 4 in) o/a; 4.70 m (15 ft 5 in) pressure hull
- Height: 9.60 m (31 ft 6 in)
- Draught: 4.74 m (15 ft 7 in)
- Installed power: 2,800–3,200 PS (2,100–2,400 kW; 2,800–3,200 bhp) (diesels); 750 PS (550 kW; 740 shp) (electric)
- Propulsion: 2 shafts; 2 × diesel engines; 2 × electric motors
- Speed: 17.7 knots (32.8 km/h; 20.4 mph) surfaced; 7.6 knots (14.1 km/h; 8.7 mph) submerged
- Range: 8,500 nmi (15,700 km; 9,800 mi) at 10 knots (19 km/h; 12 mph) surfaced; 80 nmi (150 km; 92 mi) at 4 knots (7.4 km/h; 4.6 mph) submerged
- Test depth: 230 m (750 ft); Crush depth: 250–295 m (820–968 ft)
- Complement: 4 officers, 40–56 enlisted
- Armament: 5 × 53.3 cm (21 in) torpedo tubes (four bow, one stern); 14 × torpedoes or 26 TMA mines; 1 × 8.8 cm (3.46 in) deck gun (220 rounds); 1 x 2 cm (0.79 in) C/30 AA gun

Service record
- Part of: 3rd U-boat Flotilla; 1 May – 31 December 1941; 29th U-boat Flotilla; 1 January – 28 May 1942
- Identification codes: M 42 161
- Commanders: Kptlt. Joachim Preuss; 1 May 1941 – 28 May 1942
- Operations: 5 patrols: 1st patrol: 3 August 1941 – 10 September 1941; 2nd patrol: 9 October – 7 November 1941; 3rd patrol: 4 December 1941 – 17 January 1942; 4th patrol: 2 – 30 March 1942; 5th patrol: 21 – 28 May 1942
- Victories: 1 merchant ship sunk (6,023 GRT); 2 warships sunk (1,850 tons); 1 warship damaged (1,630 tons)

German submarine U-568 was a Type VIIC U-boat built for Nazi Germany's Kriegsmarine for service during World War II. She conducted five patrols, sinking one merchant ship, two warships, and severely damaging another warship. On 28 May 1942, she was depth charged and sunk in the Mediterranean Sea; all hands survived.

== Design ==
German Type VIIC submarines were preceded by the smaller Type VIIB submarines. U-568 had a displacement of 769 tonnes (757 long tons) while surfaced and 871 tonnes (857 long tons) while submerged. She had a total length of 67.10 m (220 ft 2 in), a hull length of 50.50 m (165 ft 8 in), a beam of 6.20 m (20 ft 4 in), a height of 9.60 m (31 ft 6 in), and a draught of 4.74 m (15 ft 7 in). The submarine was powered by two Germaniawerft F46 four-stroke, six-cylinder supercharged diesel engines producing a total of 2,800 to 3,200 metric horsepower (2,060 to 2,350 kW; 2,760 to 3,160 shp) for use while surfaced, two BBC GG UB 720/8 double-acting electric motors producing a total of 750 metric horsepower (550 kW; 740 shp) for use while submerged. She had two shafts and two 1.23 m (4 ft) propellers. The boat was designed to be capable of operating at depths of up to 230 metres (750 ft).

The submarine had a maximum surface speed of 17.7 knots (32.8 km/h; 20.4 mph) and a maximum submerged speed of 7.6 knots (14.1 km/h; 8.7 mph). When submerged, the boat could operate for 80 nautical miles (150 km; 92 mi) at 4 knots (7.4 km/h; 4.6 mph); when surfaced, she could travel 8,500 nautical miles (15,700 km; 9,800 mi) at 10 knots (19 km/h; 12 mph). U-568 was fitted with five 53.3 cm (21 in) torpedo tubes (four fitted at the bow and one at the stern), fourteen torpedoes, one 8.8 cm (3.46 in) SK C/35 naval gun, 220 rounds, and a 2 cm (0.79 in) C/30 anti-aircraft gun. The boat had a complement of between forty-four and sixty, and surrendered with 47 on board.

== Construction and career ==
U-568 was ordered on 24 October 1939 and laid down six months later. It was launched on 6 March 1941. On 1 May 1941, it was commissioned; it started training the same day as part of 3rd U-boat Flotilla. The submarine completed training on 1 August 1941 and was placed under the command of Kapitänleutnant Joachim Preuss, who had already conducted five patrols with U-10.

=== First patrol ===
U-568 departed Trondheim on 3 August 1941 and was assigned to U-boat Wolfpack Grönland in the North Atlantic Ocean, arriving there a week later. On 12 August, the submarine attacked Convoy ON 4, firing two torpedoes at a "tanker" (Note: uboat.net states that the second ship attacked was a freighter.) and convoy escort Flower-class corvette Picotee (925 tons). The torpedo fired at the "tanker" went wide, but Preuss observed how the corvette "sinks immediately as her depth charges detonate (five or six of them)". All hands on board Picobee were killed in action. Other escorts stopped and held the U-boat down while the rest of the convoy escaped. Afterwards, U-568 had short stints with Woflpacks Kurfürst (23 August – 2 September 1941) and Seewolf (2 – 8 September 1941), arriving at homeport Saint-Nazaire on 10 September 1941.

=== Second patrol ===
U-568 embarked on her second patrol on 9 October 1941. On her way west into the Atlantic, she attacked Convoy SC 48 on 16 October 1941, sinking the steam merchant ship Empire Heron (6,023 GRT) with two torpedoes and killing forty-two on board. The next day, she fired a spread of four torpedoes at the United States Navy destroyer Kearny (1,630 tons) having been repeatedly depth-charged by her the previous night. One torpedo hit the ship starboard, killing 11 sailors. (Note: The explosion badly damaged the vessel, disabling it until April 1942.) Sighted by HMCS Pictou, U-568 attempted to escape the escorts by sailing under cover of a rain squall, but was pursued. The submarine attempted to sink Pictou with a torpedo, but it passed 15 ft (4.6 metres) to port and missed. Afterwards, the U-boat retreated. The Kearny incident was cited by Adolf Hitler as being reasoning for Nazi Germany declaring war against the United States, with Hitler presenting the action as starting with the Kearny attacking U-568 with depth charges.

Between 21 and 31 October 1941, U-568 was part of Wolfpack Reissewolf. After her attack on Convoy SC 48, the remainder of her patrol was routine, and she arrived at Saint-Nazaire on 7 November 1941.

=== Wolfpacks ===
She took part in four wolfpacks, namely:

- Grönland (10 – 23 August 1941)
- Kurfürst (23 August – 2 September 1941)
- Seewolf (2 – 8 September 1941)
- Reissewolf (21 – 31 October 1941)

=== Fate ===
U-568 was sunk on 28 May 1942 in the Mediterranean Sea NE of Tobruk in position 32°42′N 24°53′E, by Royal Navy vessels, the destroyer HMS Hero, and escort destroyers HMS Eridge and HMS Hurworth. All 47 hands survived.

== Summary of raiding history ==
Date	Ship Name	Nationality	Tonnage (Note: Merchant ship tonnages are in gross register tons. Military vessels are listed by tons displacement.)	Fate
12 August 1941	HMS Picotee	Royal Navy	925	Sunk
16 October 1941	Empire Heron	United Kingdom	6,023	Sunk
17 October 1941	USS Kearny	United States Navy	1,630	Damaged
24 December 1941	HMS Salvia	Royal Navy	925	Sunk

== See also ==
- Mediterranean U-boat Campaign (World War II)

== Bibliography ==
- Busch, Rainer; Röll, Hans-Joachim (1999). German U-boat commanders of World War II: a biographical dictionary. Translated by Brooks, Geoffrey. London, Annapolis, Md: Greenhill Books, Naval Institute Press. ISBN 1-55750-186-6.
- Busch, Rainer; Röll, Hans-Joachim (1999). Der U-Boot-Krieg, 1939-1945: Deutsche U-Boot-Verluste von September 1939 bis Mai 1945 [German U-boat losses from September 1939 to May 1945] (in German). Vol. IV. Hamburg, Berlin, Bonn: Mittler. ISBN 3-8132-0514-2.
- Gröner, Eric; Jung, Dieter; Maass, Martin (1991). German Warships 1815-1945: U-boats and Mine Warfare Vessels. Vol. 2. Translated by Thomas, Keith; Magowan, Rachel. London: Conway Maritime Press. ISBN 0-85177-593-4.
- Sharpe, Peter (1998). U-Boat Fact File. Great Britain: Midland Publishing. ISBN 1-85780-072-9.
- Blair, Clay (May 2000). Hitler's U-Boat War: The Hunters, 1939-1942. New York City: Modern Library. ISBN 0-679-64032-0.
- Morgan, David; Taylor, Bruce (9 November 2011). U-Boat Attack Logs: A Complete Record of Warship Sinkings from Original Sources 1939-1945. Barnsley: Seaforth Publishing. ISBN 978-1-84832-118-2.
