= Charles Peshall Plunkett =

United States Navy admiral (1864–1931)

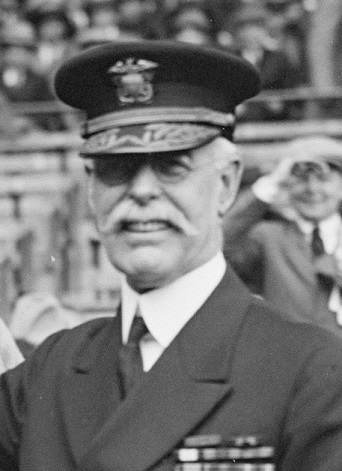
- Charles Plunkett in 1923
- Born: February 15, 1864; Washington, D.C.
- Died: March 24, 1931 (aged 67); Washington, D.C.
- Burial place: Arlington National Cemetery
- Military career
- Allegiance: United States of America
- Branch: United States Navy
- Service years: 1879–1928
- Rank: Rear Admiral
- Commands: North Dakota (BB-29); South Dakota (ACR-9)
- Conflicts: Spanish–American War; World War I
- Awards: Distinguished Service Medal; Grand Officer of the Military Order of the Tower and Sword

Rear Admiral Charles Peshall Plunkett GOTE (15 February 1864 – 24 March 1931) was an officer of the United States Navy who served in the Spanish–American War and World War I.

== Biography ==
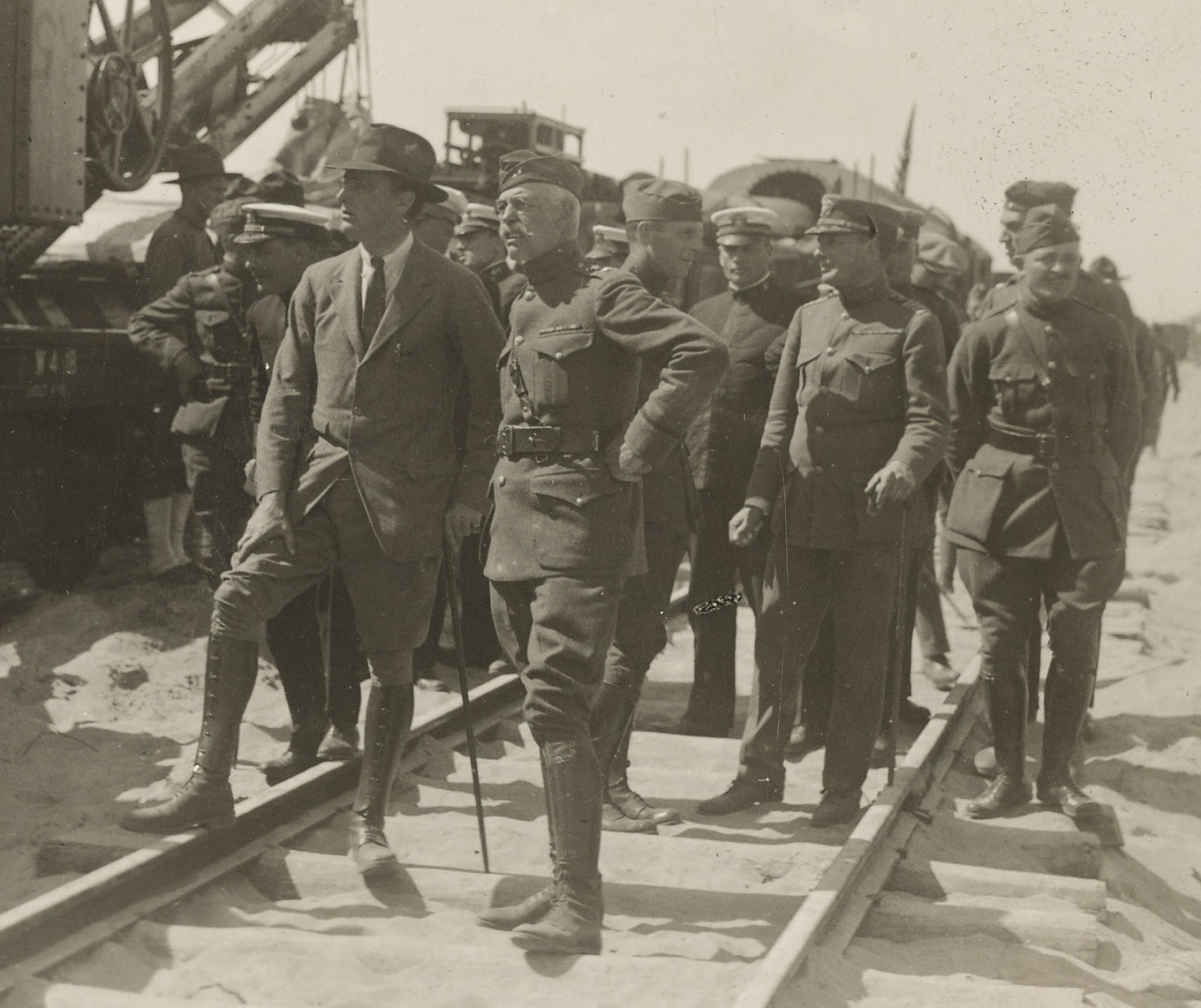
Charles Plunkett (center, army uniform) and Assistant Secretary of the Navy Franklin D. Roosevelt inspecting a US Navy Railway Battery in France August 1918.

Plunkett was born in Washington, D.C., and was appointed to the Naval Academy in 1879. During the Spanish–American War, he served in Admiral Dewey's Squadron at the Battle of Manila Bay. He commanded both the battleship North Dakota (BB-29) and the armored cruiser South Dakota (ACR-9), and served as Director of Target Practice and Engineering Competitions for the Navy Department before the United States entered World War I.

In July 1918, he designed and oversaw the building and was in command of the five Naval Railway Batteries in France. Under his direction the mobile units of 14-inch battleship guns supported the French and American armies from 6 September until the Armistice, and was awarded the Distinguished Service Medal for his service during the war. Plus the French legion of honor He later commanded Destroyers, U.S. Atlantic Fleet, and served as Chief of Staff at the Naval War College; as President of the Board of Inspection and Survey; and as Commandant of the New York Navy Yard and the 3rd Naval District.

Retiring in 1928, Rear Admiral Plunkett died in Washington, D.C., on 24 March 1931.

== Namesake ==
The Gleaves-class destroyer USS Plunkett (DD-431) was named in his honor.

== Honors ==
- Grand Officer of the Military Order of the Tower and Sword, Portugal (3 June 1919)
