= HMS Veronica (K37) =

Flower-class corvette

History

United Kingdom
- Name: HMS Veronica
- Namesake: Veronica (plant)
- Builder: Smiths Dock, Middlesbrough
- Laid down: 9 July 1940
- Launched: 17 October 1940
- Commissioned: 18 February 1941
- Decommissioned: 16 February 1942
- Identification: Pennant number: K37
- Fate: Transferred to United States Navy

United States
- Name: USS Temptress
- Commissioned: 21 March 1942
- Decommissioned: 20 August 1945
- Identification: Hull number: PG-62
- Fate: Returned to Royal Navy

United Kingdom
- Name: HMS Veronica
- Commissioned: 26 August 1945
- Decommissioned: 19 September 1945
- Fate: Sold into civilian service 1946, sunk 1947, raised and scrapped 1951

General characteristics
- Class & type: Flower-class corvette
- Displacement: 925 long tons (940 t; 1,036 short tons)
- Length: 205 ft (62.48 m)o/a
- Beam: 33 ft 2 in (10.11 m)
- Draught: 13 ft 7 in (4.14 m)
- Propulsion: single shaft; 2 × fire tube Scotch boilers; 1 × 4-cycle triple-expansion reciprocating steam engine; 2,750 ihp (2,050 kW)
- Speed: 16.5 knots (30.6 km/h)
- Range: 3,500 nautical miles (6,482 km) at 12 knots (22.2 km/h)
- Complement: 85
- Sensors & processing systems: 1 × SW1C or 2C radar; 1 × Type 123A or Type 127DV sonar
- Armament: 1 × 4-inch BL Mk.IX single gun; 2 × .50 cal machine gun (twin); 2 × Lewis .303 cal machine gun (twin); 2 × Mk.II depth charge throwers; 2 × Depth charge rails with 40 depth charges; originally fitted with minesweeping gear, later removed

HMS Veronica was a Flower-class corvette, built for the Royal Navy during the Second World War, and was in service in the Battle of the Atlantic. In 1942 she was transferred to the United States Navy as part of the reverse Lend Lease arrangement and renamed USS Temptress, the name ship of the Temptress-class gunboats. With the end of hostilities she was returned to the Royal Navy and sold into mercantile service.

== Service history ==
Veronica was built at Smiths Dock, Middlesbrough, as part of an order for the French Navy. One of the original Flower class corvettes, she was ordered on 31 August 1939, but was not completed before the fall of France. She was taken over by the Royal Navy, launched on 17 October 1940 and completed on 18 February 1941.

=== Royal Navy ===
After working up, Veronica was assigned to the Western Approaches Escort Force for service as a convoy escort. In this role Veronica was engaged in all the duties performed by escort ships; protecting convoys, searching for and attacking U-boats which attacked ships in convoy, and rescuing survivors. In twelve months service she escorted 19 Atlantic and 2 Gibraltar convoys, assisting in the safe passage of over 600 ships. She was involved in two major convoy battles. In April 1941 Veronica was part of the escort to convoy HX 121, during which four ships were sunk and one U-boat destroyed. In October 1941 she was with convoy SC 48, which saw the loss of nine merchant ships and two escorts in a four-day battle.

=== US Navy ===
Following the entry of the United States into the war the US Navy was in need of anti-submarine warfare vessels, and to meet this need a number of ships were transferred from the Royal Navy as part of a reverse Lend-Lease arrangement. Veronica was commissioned into the USN on 21 March 1942 as USS Temptress, the first of ten Flower class corvettes to be handed over. Temptress became the name ship for the group, known as Temptress-class gunboats. For the remainder of the conflict Temptress was employed as a convoy escort in the western Atlantic and Caribbean Sea. In September 1944 Temptress was caught in the Great Atlantic hurricane of that year and driven ashore on the coast of Virginia. She was later salvaged and returned to service. With the ending of hostilities Temptress was returned to the Royal Navy in August 1945.

== Fate ==
Veronica was stricken from the Navy Register in September 1945 and sold into merchant service. In 1946 she was renamed Verolock but sank in 1947 in a marine accident near Landéda. She was salvaged and sold for scrap in 1951.
