= USS Kearny =

Gleaves-class destroyer of the United States Navy, in service from 1940 to 1946

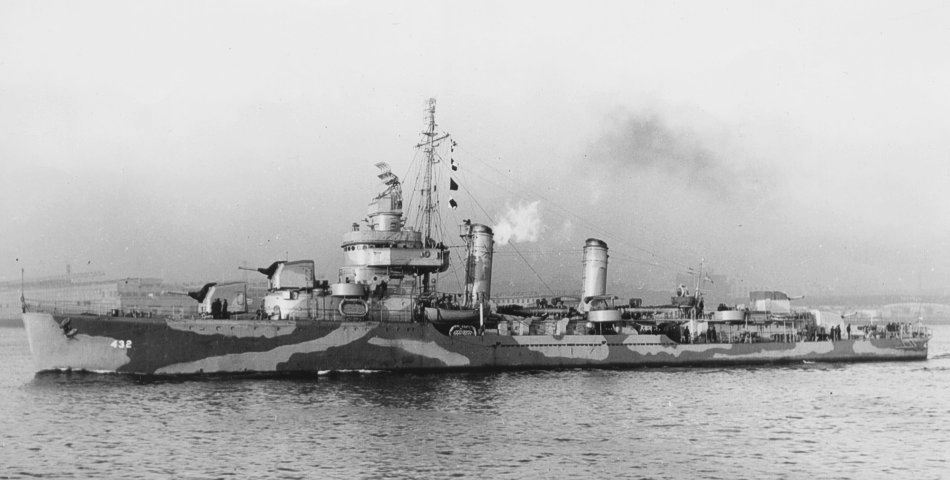
- USS Kearny (DD-432) underway in 1942.

History

United States
- Name: Kearny
- Namesake: Lawrence Kearny
- Builder: Federal Shipbuilding and Drydock Company
- Laid down: 1 March 1939
- Launched: 9 March 1940
- Commissioned: 13 September 1940
- Decommissioned: 7 March 1946
- Stricken: 1 June 1971
- Fate: Sold for scrap, 6 October 1972

General characteristics
- Class & type: Gleaves-class destroyer
- Displacement: 1,630 tons
- Length: 348 ft 3 in (106.15 m)
- Beam: 36 ft 1 in (11.00 m)
- Draft: 11 ft 10 in (3.61 m)
- Propulsion: 50,000 shp (37,000 kW); 4 boilers; 2 propellers
- Speed: 37.4 knots (69.3 km/h; 43.0 mph)
- Range: 6,500 nautical miles (12,000 km; 7,500 mi) at 12 knots (22 km/h; 14 mph)
- Complement: 16 officers, 260 enlisted
- Armament: 5 × 5 in (127 mm) DP guns, 6 × .50 cal (12.7 mm) guns, 6 × 20 mm AA guns, 10 × 21 in (53 cm) torpedo tubes, 2 × depth charge tracks

USS Kearny (DD-432), a Gleaves-class destroyer, was a United States Navy warship during World War II. She was noted for being torpedoed by a German U-boat in October 1941, before the U.S. had entered the war. She survived that attack, and later served in North Africa and the Mediterranean.

She was named for Commodore Lawrence Kearny (1789–1868).

== Early history ==
Kearny was launched 9 March 1940, by the Federal Shipbuilding and Drydock Company in Kearny, New Jersey, sponsored by Miss Mary Kearny. She was commissioned on 13 September 1940.

After shakedown and sea trials, Kearny got underway 19 February 1941, from New York Harbor for St. Thomas, Virgin Islands, where she took part in the Neutrality Patrol off Fort de France, Martinique, French West Indies, until 9 March. The new destroyer patrolled around San Juan, Puerto Rico, and escorted ships in the Norfolk area until August when she sailed for NS Argentia, Newfoundland, to escort North Atlantic convoys.

== Convoys escorted ==
Convoy	Escort Group	Dates	Notes
HX 151		24 Sept-1 Oct 1941	from Newfoundland to Iceland prior to US declaration of war
ON 24		13-14 Oct 1941	from Iceland to Newfoundland prior to US declaration of war
SC 48		16-17 Oct 1941	battle reinforcement prior to US declaration of war; torpedoed by U-568
AT 18		6-17 Aug 1942	troopships from New York City to Firth of Clyde

== Kearny incident ==
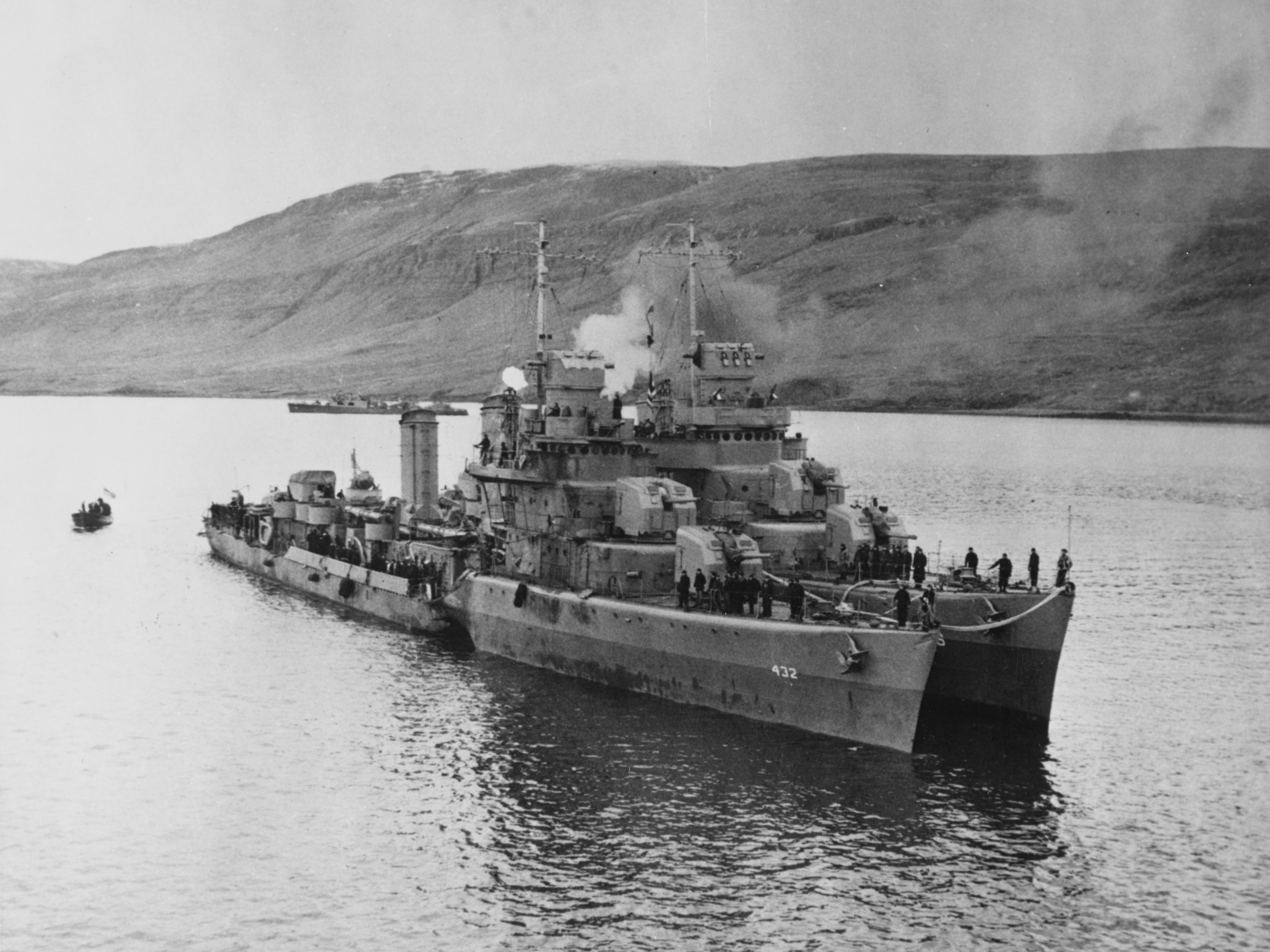
Kearny at Reykjavík alongside Monssen, after she had been torpedoed. Note the hole in her starboard side.

On 17 October 1941, while the U.S. was still officially neutral in World War II, Kearny was docked at Reykjavík in Iceland, whose occupation had been taken over from the Allies by the Americans in July that year. A "wolfpack" of German U-boats attacked a nearby British convoy, and overwhelmed her Canadian escorts. Kearny and three other U.S. destroyers were summoned to assist.

Immediately on reaching the action, Kearny dropped depth charges on the U-boats, and continued to barrage throughout the night. This action was specifically cited as a provocation in Hitler's declaration of war on the U.S. two months later. At the beginning of the midwatch 17 October, a torpedo fired by U-568 struck Kearny on the starboard side, killing 11 and injuring 22 others. The crew confined flooding to the forward fire room, enabling the ship to get out of the danger zone with power from the aft engine and fire room. Regaining power in the forward engine room, Kearny steamed to Iceland at 10 knots (20 km/h), arriving 19 October. After temporary repairs Kearny got underway Christmas Day 1941, and moored six days later at Boston, Massachusetts, for permanent repairs.

The survival of Kearny led to renewed support for split fire rooms and engine rooms in naval vessels.

== Later history ==
From 5 April to 28 September 1942, Kearny escorted convoys to Great Britain, the Panama Canal, and Galveston, Texas. Late in September, she was assigned to the North African invasion. There she screened USS Texas and Savannah on fire support missions, shot down an enemy plane, and escorted troop ships to Safi, French Morocco. Kearny departed the invasion theater and escorted a convoy back to New York, arriving 3 December 1942.

Through most of 1943, Kearny escorted ships to Port of Spain, Trinidad; Recife, Brazil; and Casablanca. On 25 November 1943, Kearny joined the "hunter-killer" task group based on the escort carrier Core on 25 November. During the day of 1 January 1944, in coordination with Core's planes, Kearny fired a depth charge attack on a submarine resulting in a large oil slick. She returned to New York 18 January.

Next month Kearny joined the Eighth Fleet in French Algeria. On 10 March, she was attached to the cruiser Brooklyn in a group providing fire support for the U.S. 5th Army in Italy. Due to their daily fire-support trips to the Anzio beachhead area, the warships became known as the "Anzio Express." They were commended by the Fifth Army commander, General Mark W. Clark, for this fire support.

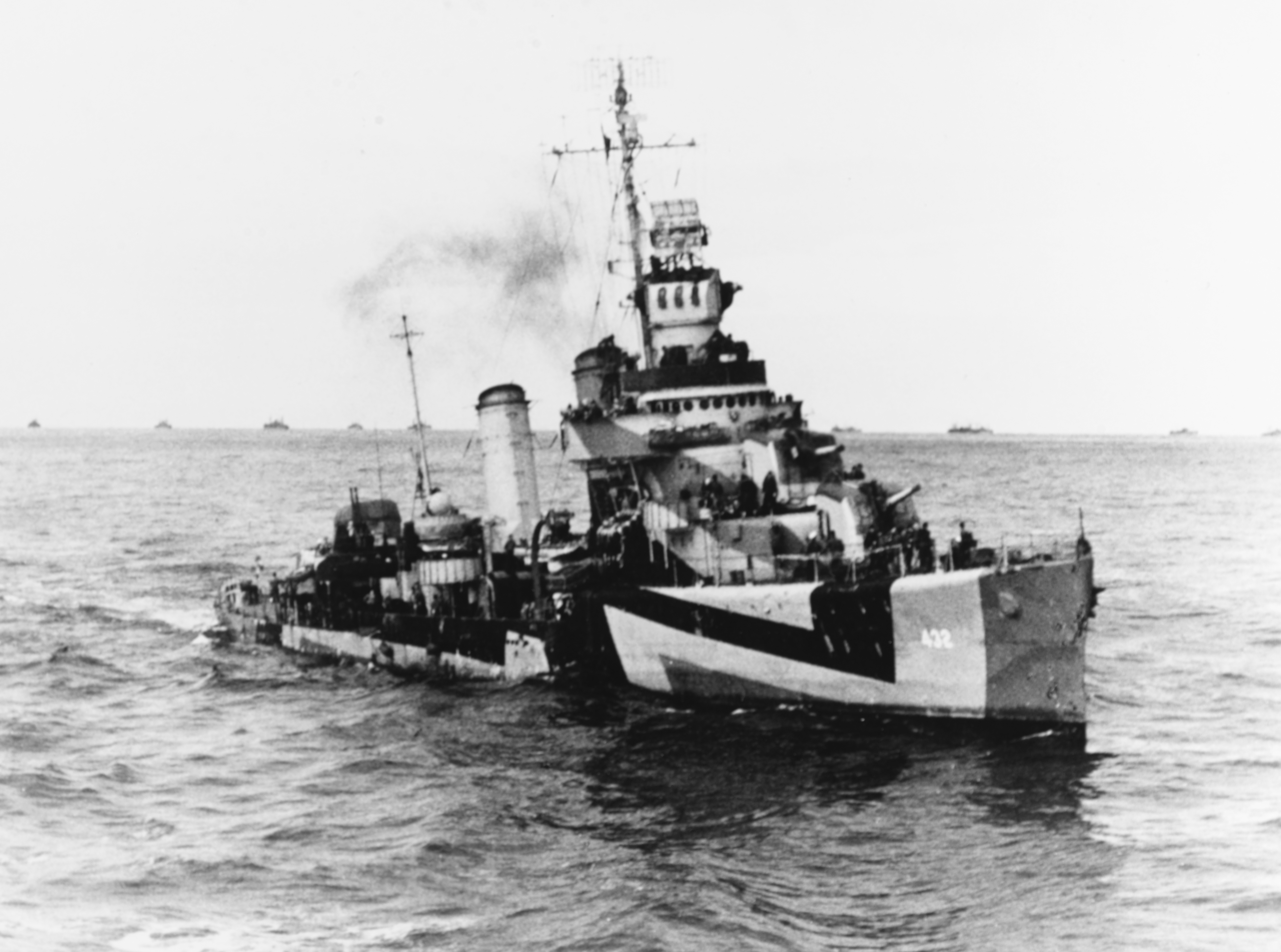
Kearny off Gibraltar, circa 1944.

Kearny was detached from the group the beginning of June and steamed to Anzio alone to give Allied troops their last naval fire support prior to their breakthrough and capture of Rome. The veteran destroyer saw more convoy duty before sailing for the invasion of southern France on 15 August.

Kearny was inner fire support ship for Red Beach in Cavalaire Bay, and rendered counter-battery fire and pre-H-hour bombardment. She screened heavy fire support ships and laid smoke screens off Toulon. On 19 August 1944, she began two months of duty escorting troopships between Naples and southern France.

Afterward, Kearny made several trans-Atlantic voyages between New York and Oran. On 6 August 1945, Kearny transited the Panama Canal to the Pacific, arriving at Pearl Harbor late in August after hostilities had ended. She escorted a transport squadron carrying occupation troops to Japan via Saipan, arriving at Wakayama, Japan, 27 September. During the next month Kearny made voyages to the Philippines and Okinawa before returning to Japan in October. She sailed from Wakayama, Japan, 29 October 1945, for home via Pearl Harbor, San Diego, and the Panama Canal, arriving Charleston, South Carolina, 5 December 1945. She decommissioned there 7 March 1946, and went into reserve. Kearny was subsequently moved to Orange, Texas. The ship was struck from the Naval Vessel Register on 1 June 1971, sold 6 October 1972, and broken up for scrap.

== Awards and memorabilia ==
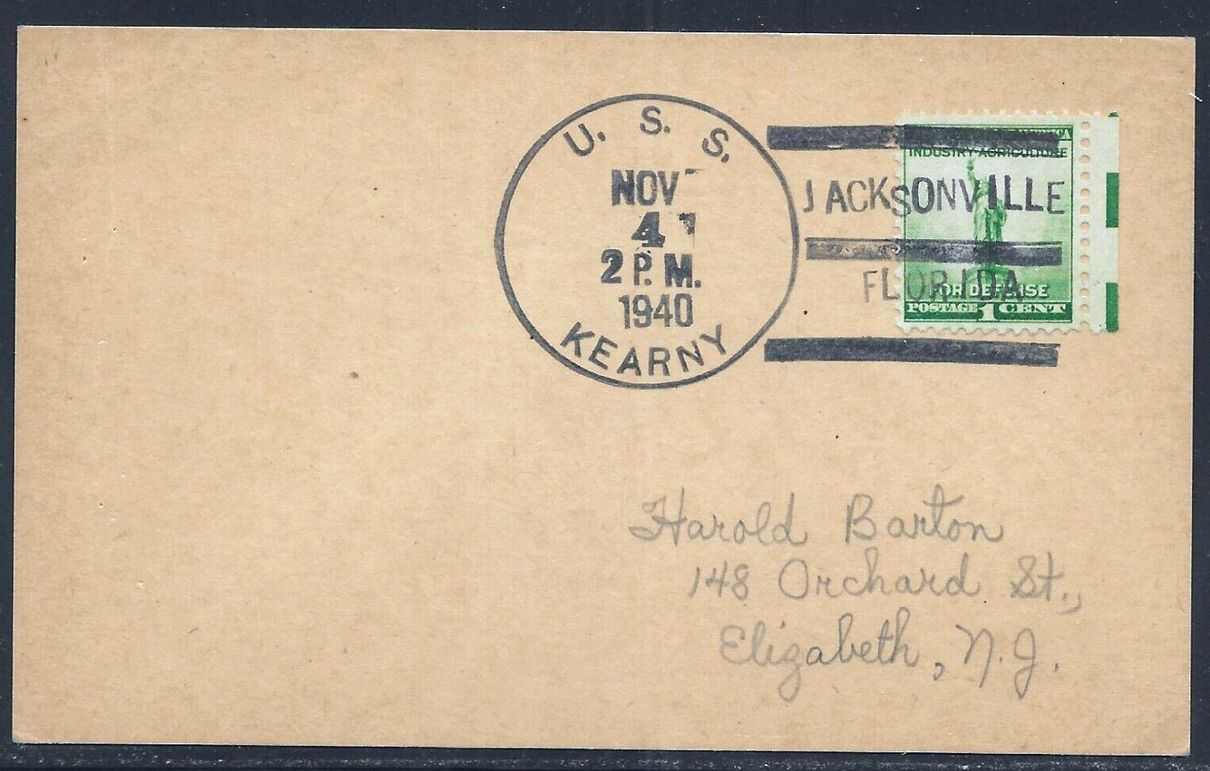
USS Kearny naval cover, w/ ship's postmark

- American Defense Service Medal with "FLEET" clasp and "A" device
- European-African-Middle Eastern Campaign Medal with three battle stars
- Asiatic–Pacific Campaign Medal
- World War II Victory Medal
- Navy Occupation Medal with "ASIA" clasp

== See also ==
- Battle of the Atlantic (1939–1945)
