= HMCS Wetaskiwin =

Flower-class corvette

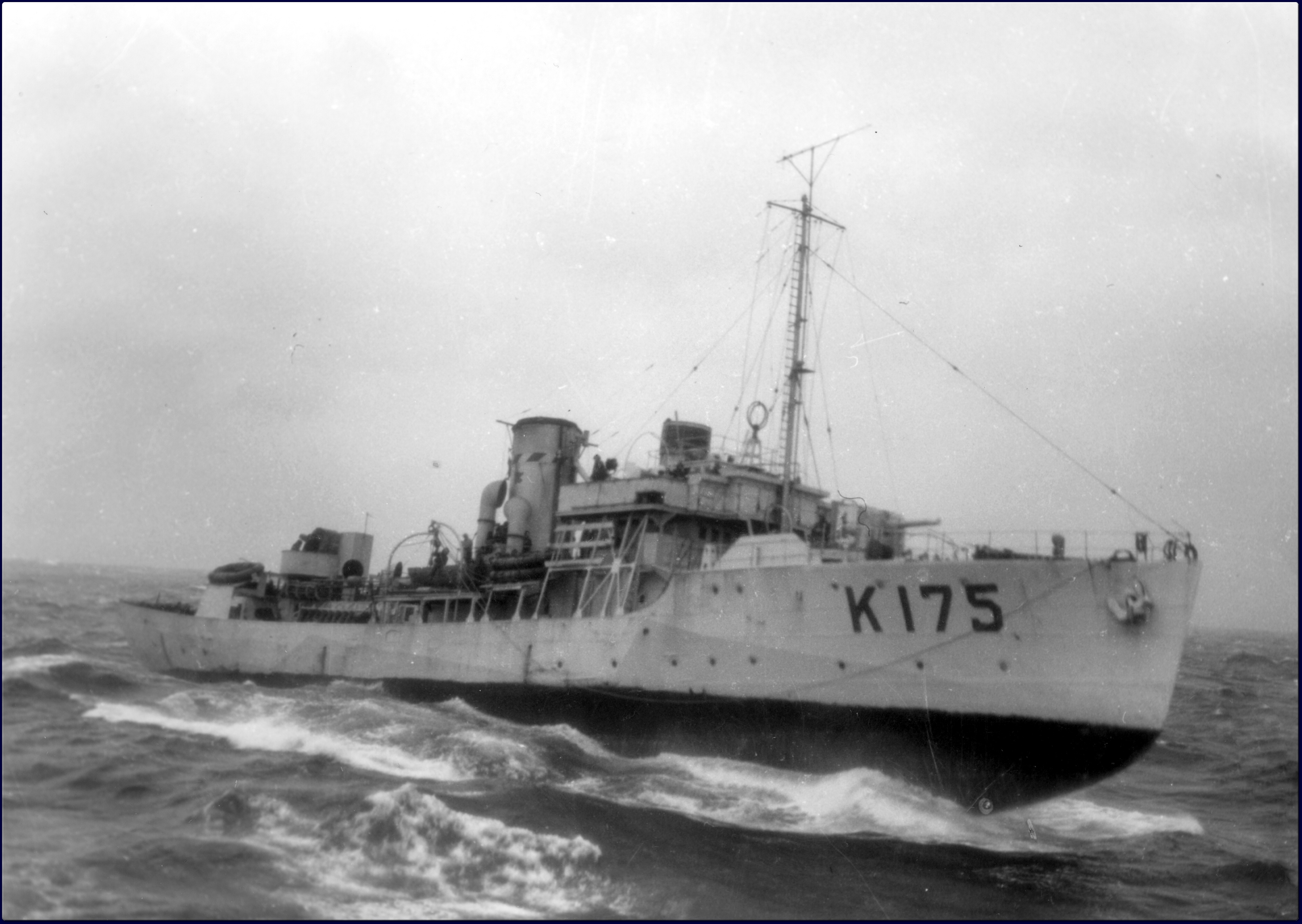
- HMCS Wetaskiwin, circa 1943-1944.

History

Canada
- Name: Wetaskiwin
- Namesake: Wetaskiwin, Alberta
- Ordered: 14 February 1940
- Builder: Burrard Dry Dock Co. Ltd., North Vancouver
- Laid down: 11 April 1940
- Launched: 18 July 1940
- Commissioned: 17 December 1940
- Identification: Pennant number: K175
- Honours and awards: Atlantic 1941-45; Gulf of St. Lawrence 1944
- Fate: Sold to Venezuelan Navy as ARV Victoria

Venezuela
- Name: Victoria
- Acquired: purchased from Royal Canadian Navy
- Commissioned: 1946
- Out of service: 1962
- Fate: Scrapped 1962

General characteristics
- Class & type: Flower-class corvette (original)
- Displacement: 925 long tons (940 t; 1,036 short tons)
- Length: 205 ft (62.48 m)o/a
- Beam: 33 ft (10.06 m)
- Draught: 11.5 ft (3.51 m)
- Propulsion: single shaft; 2 × fire tube Scotch boilers; 1 × 4-cycle triple-expansion reciprocating steam engine; 2,750 ihp (2,050 kW)
- Speed: 16 knots (29.6 km/h)
- Range: 3,500 nautical miles (6,482 km) at 12 knots (22.2 km/h)
- Complement: 85
- Sensors & processing systems: 1 × SW1C or 2C radar; 1 × Type 123A or Type 127DV sonar
- Armament: 1 × BL 4 in (102 mm) Mk.IX single gun; 2 × .50 cal machine gun (twin); 2 × Lewis .303 cal machine gun (twin); 2 × Mk.II depth charge throwers; 2 × depth charge rails with 40 depth charges; originally fitted with minesweeping gear, later removed

HMCS Wetaskiwin was a Flower-class corvette of the Royal Canadian Navy that served during the Second World War. She served primarily as a convoy escort in the Battle of the Atlantic. She was named after the city of Wetaskiwin, Alberta. Wetaskiwin was the first Pacific coast built corvette to enter service with the Royal Canadian Navy.

== Background ==
Flower-class corvettes like Wetaskiwin serving with the Royal Canadian Navy during the Second World War were different from earlier and more traditional sail-driven corvettes. The "corvette" designation was created by the French for classes of small warships; the Royal Navy borrowed the term for a period but discontinued its use in 1877. During the hurried preparations for war in the late 1930s, Winston Churchill reactivated the corvette class, needing a name for smaller ships used in an escort capacity, in this case based on a whaling ship design. The generic name "flower" was used to designate the class of these ships, which – in the Royal Navy – were named after flowering plants.

Corvettes commissioned by the Royal Canadian Navy during the Second World War were named after communities for the most part, to better represent the people who took part in building them. This idea was put forth by Admiral Percy W. Nelles. Sponsors were commonly associated with the community for which the ship was named. Royal Navy corvettes were designed as open sea escorts, while Canadian corvettes were developed for coastal auxiliary roles which was exemplified by their minesweeping gear. Eventually the Canadian corvettes would be modified to allow them to perform better on the open seas.

== Construction ==
Originally named Banff for Banff, Alberta, she was ordered 14 February 1940 as part of the 1939-1940 Flower-class building program. She was laid down by Burrard Dry Dock Co. Ltd. in North Vancouver on 11 April 1940 and launched on 18 July 1940. Before commissioning her name was changed due to a name conflict with a Royal Navy vessel and she was commissioned as Wetaskiwin on 17 December 1940 at Esquimalt, British Columbia.

During her career, Wetaskiwin had three significant refits. The first began in February 1942 at Liverpool, Nova Scotia. The second began in mid-January 1943 and was completed in March at Liverpool. Further repairs were needed at Halifax after the refit was completed. In December 1943, Wetaskiwin was sent to Galveston, Texas to refit. This refit took until 6 March 1944 during which her fo'c'sle was extended. It was to be her final major refit of the war.

== War duty ==
After working up in the Pacific, Wetaskiwin was transferred to the Atlantic Ocean in March 1941. She arrived at Halifax 13 April 1941. In May she was assigned to the Newfoundland Escort Force as a convoy escort on the route between St. John's and Iceland. She remained with this unit until January 1942, when she departed for refit. During this assignment, Wetaskiwin participated in the battles for convoy SC 42 in September 1941 and convoy SC 48 in October 1941.

After returning to service, Wetaskiwin joined the Mid-Ocean Escort Force (MOEF) escort group C-3. While escorting Convoy ON 115, on 31 July 1942 she shared the destruction of U-588 with HMCS Skeena. She also participated in the battle for Convoy SC 109.

After yard overhaul, Wetaskiwin was assigned to MOEF escort group A-3 for the battle of Convoy HX 233. When group A3 disbanded, Wetaskiwin was assigned to MOEF group C-5 in May 1943 and participated in the battle for Convoy HX 305. Wetaskiwin escorted North American coastal convoys with the Western Local Escort Force (WLEF) from October 1944 until May 1945. As a member of WLEF she was assigned to escort group W-7 for the majority of her time with the force.

=== Trans-Atlantic convoys escorted ===
Convoy	Escort Group	Dates	Notes
HX 147		29 August – 8 September 1941	64 ships escorted without loss from Newfoundland to Iceland
SC 42		10–16 September 1941	Newfoundland to Iceland; 15 ships torpedoed & sunk
ON 16		20–26 September 1941	42 ships escorted without loss from Iceland to Newfoundland
SC 48		9–17 October 1941	Newfoundland to Iceland; 9 ships torpedoed & sunk
ON 27		23 October – 2 November 1941	61 ships escorted without loss from Iceland to Newfoundland
SC 54		12–22 November 1941	70 ships escorted without loss from Newfoundland to Iceland
ON 40		30 November – 4 December 1941	28 ships escorted without loss from Iceland to Newfoundland
SC 60		19–28 December 1941	22 ships escorted without loss from Newfoundland to Iceland
ON 52		5–11 January 1942	42 ships escorted without loss from Iceland to Newfoundland
HX 191	MOEF group C3	28 May – 5 June 1942	24 ships escorted without loss from Newfoundland to Northern Ireland
ON 104	MOEF group C3	17–27 June 1942	36 ships escorted without loss from Northern Ireland to Newfoundland
SC 90	MOEF group C3	6–16 July 1942	32 ships escorted without loss from Newfoundland to Northern Ireland
ON 115	MOEF group C3	25 July – 2 August 1942	Northern Ireland to Newfoundland; 3 ships torpedoed (2 sank)
HX 202	MOEF group C3	12–17 August 1942	43 ships escorted without loss from Newfoundland to Iceland
ON 121	MOEF group C3	17–20 August 1942	34 ships escorted without loss from Iceland to Newfoundland
SC 98	MOEF group C3	2–12 September 1942	69 ships escorted without loss from Newfoundland to Northern Ireland
ON 131	MOEF group C3	19–28 September 1942	54 ships escorted without loss from Northern Ireland to Newfoundland
HX 210	MOEF group C3	7–14 October 1942	36 ships escorted without loss from Newfoundland to Northern Ireland
ON 141	MOEF group C3	26 October – 3 November 1942	59 ships escorted without loss from Northern Ireland to Newfoundland
SC 109	MOEF group C3	16–28 November 1942	Newfoundland to Northern Ireland; 2 ships torpedoed (1 sank)
ON 152	MOEF group C3	10–28 December 1942	15 ships escorted without loss from Northern Ireland to Newfoundland
HX 221	MOEF group C3	31 December 1942 – 5 January 1943	36 ships escorted without loss from Newfoundland to Northern Ireland
HX 233	MOEF group A3	12–20 April 1943	Newfoundland to Northern Ireland; 1 ship torpedoed & sunk
ON 182	MOEF group C5	7–16 May 1943	56 ships escorted without loss from Northern Ireland to Newfoundland
HX 240	MOEF group C5	25 May – 3 June 1943	56 ships escorted without loss from Newfoundland to Northern Ireland
ON 188	MOEF group C5	11–20 June 1943	56 ships escorted without loss from Northern Ireland to Newfoundland
HX 245	MOEF group C5	29 June – 5 July 1943	84 ships escorted without loss from Newfoundland to Northern Ireland
ON 193	MOEF group C5	17–25 July 1943	80 ships escorted without loss from Northern Ireland to Newfoundland
HX 250	MOEF group C5	5–11 August 1943	75 ships escorted without loss from Newfoundland to Northern Ireland
ON 199	MOEF group C5	27 August – 4 September 1943	59 ships escorted without loss from Northern Ireland to Newfoundland
HX 256	MOEF group C5	15–21 September 1943	59 ships escorted without loss from Newfoundland to Northern Ireland
ON 205	MOEF group C5	6–16 October 1943	66 ships escorted without loss from Northern Ireland to Newfoundland
HX 262	MOEF group C5	24 October – 2 November 1943	59 ships escorted without loss from Newfoundland to Northern Ireland
ON 211	MOEF group C5	14–24 November 1943	49 ships escorted without loss from Northern Ireland to Newfoundland
HX 295	MOEF group C5	15–23 June 1944	80 ships escorted without loss from Newfoundland to Northern Ireland
ON 243	MOEF group C5	4–12 July 1944	89 ships escorted without loss from Northern Ireland to Newfoundland
HX 300	MOEF group C5	24 July – 3 August 1944	166 ships escorted without loss from Newfoundland to Northern Ireland in the largest convoy of the war
ON 248S	MOEF group C5	11–21 August 1944	102 ships escorted without loss from Northern Ireland to Newfoundland
HX 305	MOEF group C5	30 August – 9 September 1944	Newfoundland to Northern Ireland; 2 ships torpedoed & sunk
ON 255	MOEF group C5	23 September – 4 October 1944	84 ships escorted without loss from Northern Ireland to Newfoundland

== Post-war service ==
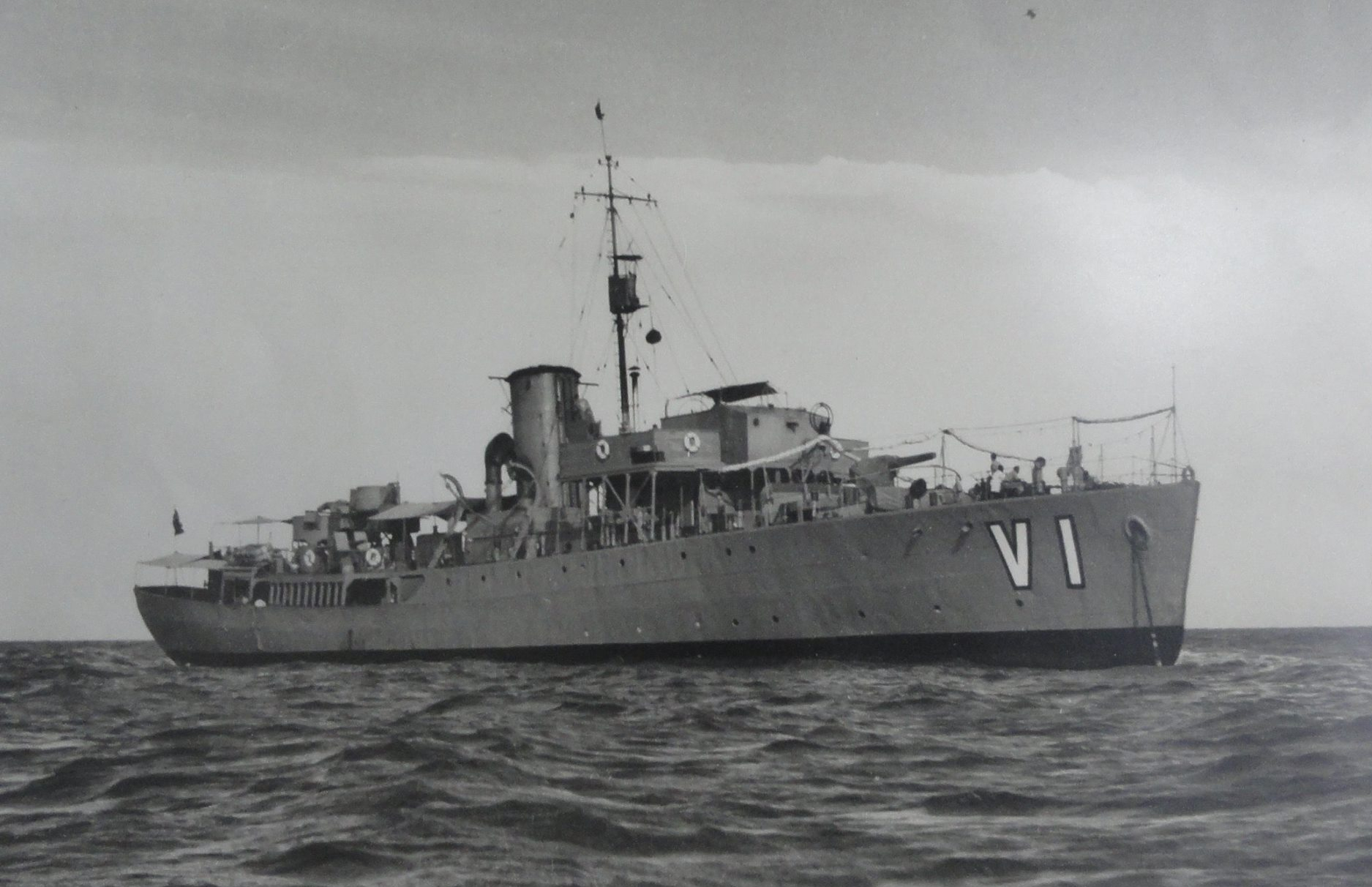
Victoria in venezuelan navy.

Following the end of hostilities, Wetaskiwin was paid off at Sorel, Quebec 19 June 1945. In 1946 she was sold to the Venezuelan Navy and renamed Victoria. She was discarded and sold for scrapping in 1962.

== Ship's badge ==
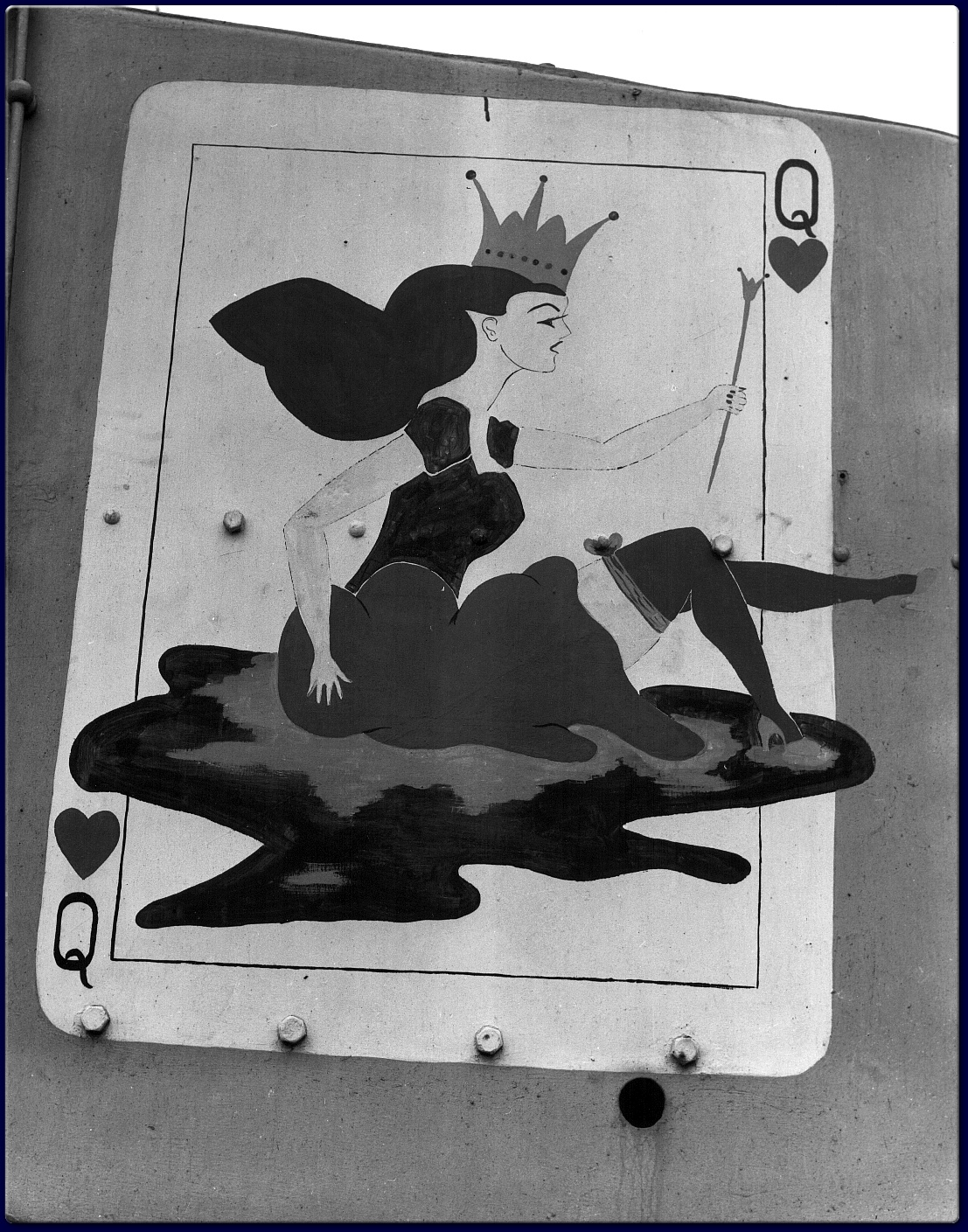
Wetaskiwin's unofficial badge.

Between 1910 and 1948, there were no official badges or insignia for the Royal Canadian Navy's ships. During the Second World War, many ships in the rapidly expanding RCN had an unofficial badge, often using humorous imagery or cartoon characters and other references to popular culture. In the case of corvettes, they were usually mounted on the shield for the ship's 4-inch gun or on the outside of the bridge. Wetaskiwin's badge featured a queen of hearts sitting in a puddle of water, which was a reference to the ship's nickname: "Wet Ass Queen".

The original "wet ass queen" painting from the Wetaskiwin's wardroom bulkhead hangs on the wall at the Crow's Nest Officer's Club in St. John's Newfoundland.. The reproduction was painted by Burnie Forbes, a rating (ordinary seaman), at the request of the Wetaskiwin's CO, in 1942. Because Forbes was not an officer, he was not permitted in the club to see the original and had to paint the gun shield based on descriptions of the original from the ship's officers.

A mural of HMCS Wetaskiwin adorns the side of the Royal Canadian Legion hall in Wetaskiwin, Alberta.
