= Convoy SC 48 =

Convoy during naval battles of the Second World War

Convoy
- Part of World War II
Date	14–18 October 1941
Location	North Atlantic
Result	German victory

Belligerents
Kriegsmarine	Royal Navy; Royal Canadian Navy

Commanders and leaders
Admiral Karl Dönitz	Comm:HM Sanders; SOE: Lt.Cdr SW Davis :Capt L Thebaud :Cdr J Baker-Cresswell

Strength
Mordbrenner; 8 U-boats	52 ships 18 escorts

Casualties and losses
none lost 1 U-boat damaged	9 merchant ships sunk 2 warships sunk 1 warship damaged 369 killed

SC 48 was a North Atlantic convoy of the SC series which ran during the battle of the Atlantic in World War II.

It was notable for being the occasion of the Kearny incident, which brought the United States one step closer to war with Germany.

== Prelude ==
SC 48 was an east-bound convoy of 52 ships, carrying war materials and sailed from Sydney, Cape Breton on 5 October 1941 bound for Liverpool. It was under the command of Commodore HM Sanders in the MV Castalia.

It was escorted by a Canadian escort group consisting of the Town-class destroyer HMCS Columbia (Lt Cdr SW Davis as Senior Officer Escort), and seven Flower-class corvettes; HMCS Wetaskiwin, HMCS Rosthern, HMCS Baddeck, HMCS Camrose, HMCS Shediac, HMS Gladiolus and the Free French Naval Forces' Mimosa.

On 9 October the group Mordbrenner was formed in the area south of Iceland near the Mid-Ocean Meeting Point. This was the point at which North Atlantic convoys were handed over between the Ocean and the Western Approaches escorts at this stage of the Atlantic campaign. Initially the group was composed of four boats : U-109, U-208, U-374 and U-573. The next day U-502, U-553 and U-568 were also ordered to join the group. In addition the following boats sailing from France were sent as reinforcement : U-73, U-77, U-101, U-432, U-558 and U-751.

Allied intelligence became aware of the presence of Mordbrenner, and started to divert the convoys then at sea, but a loss of Ultra intelligence on 12/13 October left SC 48 in the dark; and on the night of 14/15 October it was sighted by U-553 (K/L Karl Thurmann).

At this point in time SC 48 was in some disarray; 11 of its ships, including Castalia, were straggling following heavy weather on the night of 9/10 October. Columbia and two of the corvettes, Camrose and Rosthern, were detached looking for them. A third corvette, Shediac was also separated by the storm and out of radio contact. On 14 October SC 48's escort comprised just four corvettes; Wetaskiwin (as Acting SOE), Baddeck, Gladiolus and Mimosa.

== Action ==
=== 15 October 1941 ===
In the early hours of 15 October Thurmann of U-553 reported his contact to U-boat Command (BdU) and was ordered to shadow, whilst other U-boats were gathered for the attack. However Thurmann chose to attack that night, and succeeded in sinking two ships, Silvercedar, which lost 21 crew, and Ila, most of whose crew were saved. U-553 was sighted by Silverhelm, the next ship in the column, which attempted to ram, but failed; U-553 was also sighted by WC Teagle, but she was unable to bring her gun to bear before U-553 escaped.

On 15 October Enigma was re-acquired and Western Approaches Command realized a major attack was building; a number of escorts from nearby convoys were diverted to reinforce SC 48. First a force of US destroyers (DesRon 13), detached from ON 24; two Royal Navy destroyers (HMS Highlander and HMS Broadwater) from TC 14; two Royal Navy corvettes (HMS Abelia and HMS Veronica) from ON 25; and a RCN corvette (HMCS Pictou) from Iceland.

Later on 15 October Columbia rejoined, while U-553 was joined by two more boats; U-558 and U-568. As U-553 continued to shadow, she was sighted by Columbia, who attacked her, driving her away, but with no damage; U-553 fired a torpedo at Columbia, which missed. During the day U-558 joined, having encountered the ship Vancouver Island sailing independently; she was sunk with the loss of all 73 crew and 32 passengers. Before nightfall U-568 also arrived, and the three boats prepared to attack.

As darkness fell on the night of 15/16 October the U-boats attacked again. U-568 attacked and sank Empire Heron, Gladiolus counter-attacked, and U-568 was driven off. Gladiolus then detached to pick up survivors, but never rejoined the convoy; she was lost with all hands, reportedly sunk by U-568 on the 17th, but more probably much earlier.

=== 16 October 1941 ===
After midnight on 15/16 October, SC 48 made an emergency turn to port, followed before dawn by a turn to starboard, in an attempt to shake off pursuit. This was initially successful, but the pack regained contact in the afternoon of 16 October and again closed in.

Also in the afternoon of 16 October, the first reinforcements arrived, in the form of DesRon 13. This comprised the destroyers USS Decatur, USS Kearny, and USS Livermore, led by USS Plunkett (Capt L Thebaud). These were joined later by Thebaud's fifth destroyer, USS Greer, accompanied by HMCS Pictou. As senior officer present, Thebaud assumed command of the escorts. Though he had seniority, Thebaud had little experience in escort work, and a number of mistakes were made allowing the U-boats to mount a successful attack that night.

During the night of 16/17 October the pack attacked, closing in with little interference from the escorts. U-553 sank Bold Venture at about 8 PM. U-558 sank WC Teagle about an hour later. Erviken was attacked and sunk as she stopped to pick up survivors and Rym was also sunk as she slowed to do the same. U-432 sank Evros and Barfonn just before midnight.

Just after midnight, USS Kearny stopped to avoid a collision with a corvette, and was torpedoed by U-568. Kearny was severely damaged, with 11 killed and 22 wounded, but was saved by effort of the crew. She was detached to Iceland, escorted by Decatur and Greer.

In the early hours of 17 October more warships arrived: HMS Highlander and Broadwater from TC 14, and HMS Abelia and Veronica from ON 25. With this reinforcement further attacks were warded off.

Only U-73, U-77, U-101 and U-751 remain in contact with the convoy.

=== 17 October 1941 ===
At dawn on 17 October the convoy was joined by its Western Approaches escort. This was EG 3 (Cdr J Baker-Cresswell as SOE), comprising four destroyers (HMS Bulldog, HMS Amazon, HMS Richmond and HMS Georgetown) and one corvette (HMS Heartsease), with two trawlers and a rescue ship. The RCN group departed at this point, being low on fuel; also DesRon 13 left to follow Kearny to Iceland.

The pack was still in contact, but all further attacks were frustrated by the escort. Veronica made a determined attack on a contact and claimed a kill, but no U-boat loss was confirmed. A Catalina flying air cover also bombed U-558 which was damaged, but continued to shadow until the attack was called off.

=== 18 October 1941 ===
On the night of 17/18 October the pack tried again; all attacks were repelled but U-101 fired on Broadwater, causing her mortal damage; she remained afloat for another 12 hours, but had to be abandoned and sunk.

On 18 October BdU ordered the attack discontinued. Mordbrenner, which had never completely formed, was dissolved, the remaining boats being sent west to form a new patrol line off the coast of Canada. The remaining boats were moved east to form a new patrol line, Reisswolf, south-east of Greenland.

=== 22 October 1941 ===
SC 48 continued without further loss, the 31 ships arriving at Liverpool on 22 October 1941. The 11 stragglers which had become separated in the storm on 10 October had been gathered up by Camrose and Rosthern. Led by Commodore Sanders in Castalia and with just two corvettes as escort this group was able to make the crossing without interference, arriving in Britain 10 days after the main body.

== Conclusion ==
This was undoubtedly a victory for the U-boat arm; SC 48 lost nine ships of 51,093 tons, while the escort lost two ships sunk and or damaged; no U-boats were lost. Some of the losses, in the face of a large and powerful escort force, can be attributed to Captain Thebaud's inexperience in convoy escort duty. This, and other cases, led to the practice of leaving the escort group commander of the convoy in charge of its defence, regardless of seniority; a major break with tradition. The attack on Kearny and the loss of American lives was seen as an affront to the United States, and was another step out of her isolation in World War II.

== Tables ==
=== Allied ships sunk ===
Date	Name	Nationality	Casualties	Tonnage	Sunk by...
14/15 October 1941	Silvercedar	United Kingdom	20	4,354	U-553
14/15 October 1941	Ila	Norway	14	1,583	U-553
15/16 October 1941	Empire Heron	United Kingdom	42	6,023	U-568
16/17 October 1941	Bold Venture	Panama	17	3,222	U-553
16/17 October 1941	W.C Teagle	United Kingdom	48	9,552	U-558
16/17 October 1941	Erviken	Norway	28	6,595	U-558
16/17 October 1941	Rym	Norway	0	1,369	U-558
16/17 October 1941	Evros	Greece	30	5,283	U-432
16/17 October 1941	Barfonn	Norway	14	9,739	U-432

=== Allied warships hit ===
Date	Name	Nationality	Casualties	Type	Fate	Hit by...
16/17 October 1941	Gladiolus	Royal Navy	89	Flower-class corvette	sunk	U-558
16/17 October 1941	Kearny	United States Navy	11	Benson-Livermore-class destroyer	damaged	U-568
17/18 October 1941	Broadwater	Royal Navy	56	Town-class destroyer	sunk	U-101

=== U-boats hit ===
Date	Number	Type	Captain	Casualties	Fate	hit by...
18 October 1941	U-558	VIIC	Krech	0	Damaged	Catalina flying boat
