= HMS Picotee =

Flower-class corvette

Coordinates: 62°N 18°W

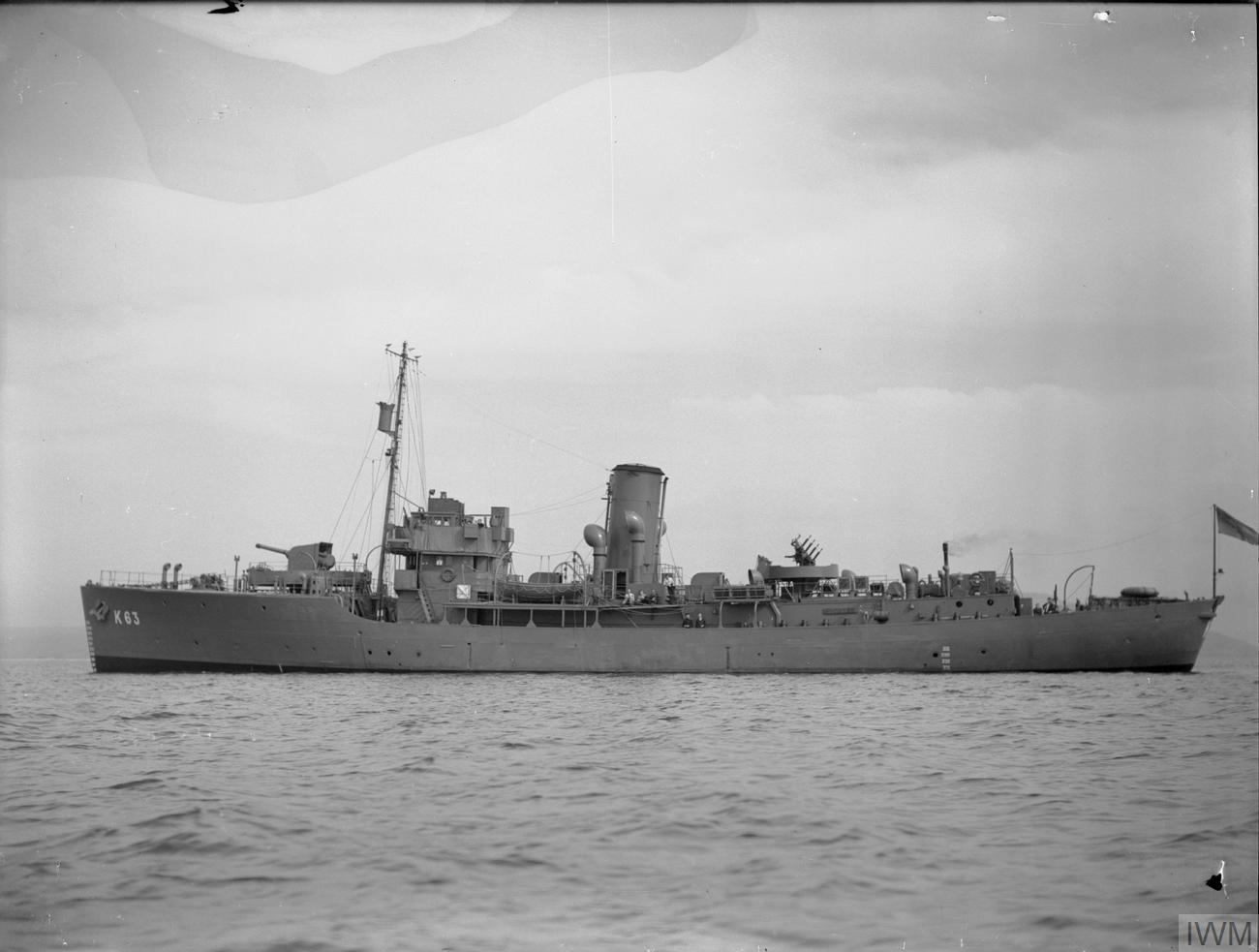
- HMS Picotee in July 1941

History

United Kingdom
- Name: HMS Picotee
- Builder: Harland and Wolff
- Yard number: 1069
- Laid down: 21 March 1940
- Launched: 19 July 1940
- Completed: 5 September 1940
- Commissioned: 5 September 1940
- Identification: Pennant number: K63
- Fate: Sunk 12 August 1941

General characteristics
- Class & type: Flower-class corvette
- Complement: 66

HMS Picotee (K63) was a Flower-class corvette that served in the Royal Navy. She was built at Harland and Wolff, launched on 21 March 1940 and completed on 5 September 1940. Under the command of Lieutenant R.A. Harrison, she was tasked to convoy escort operations in the North Atlantic. She was torpedoed and sunk on the morning of 12 August 1941 by U-568. There were no survivors.
