= HMCS Baddeck (K147) =

Flower-class corvette

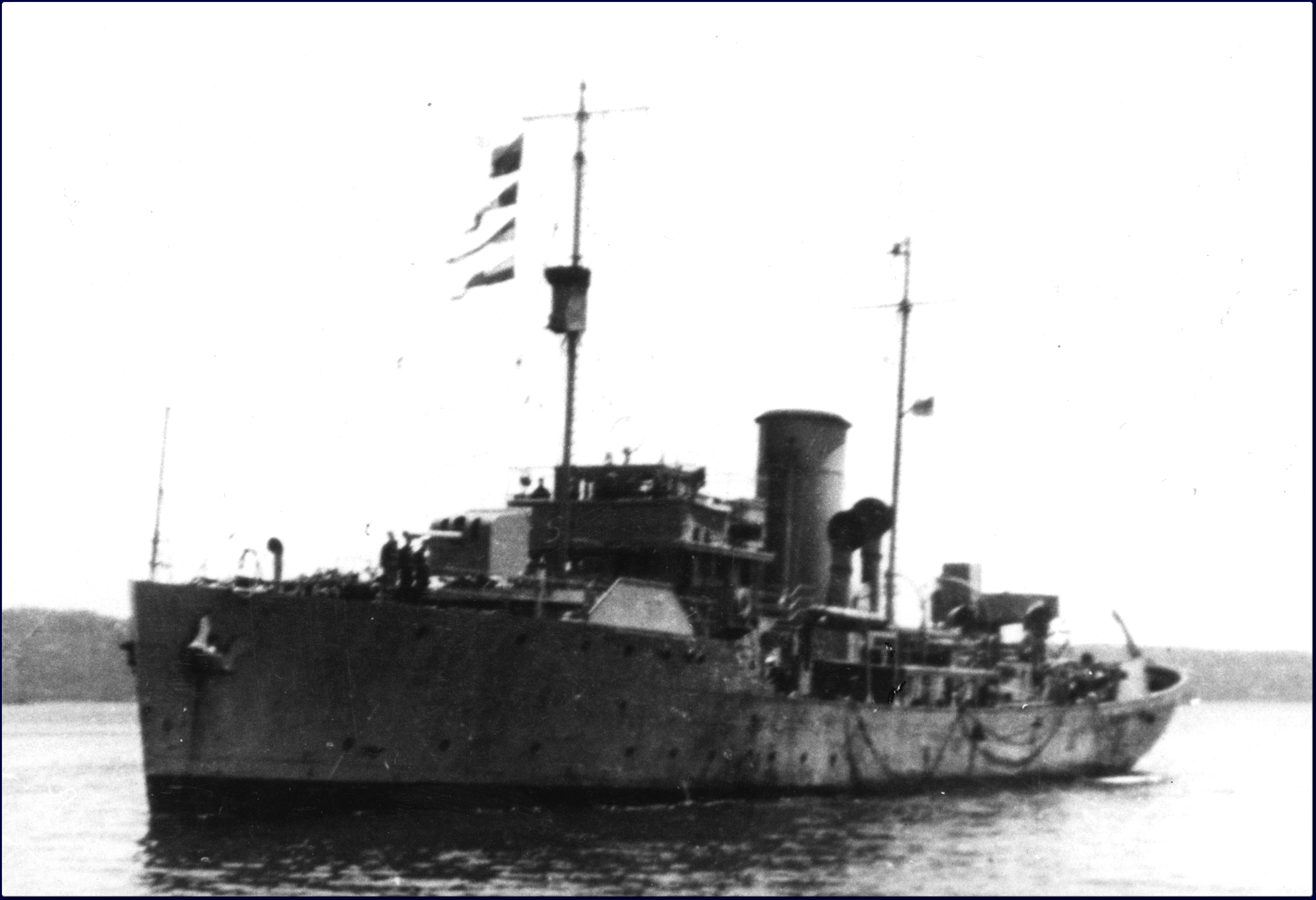

History

Canada
- Name: Baddeck
- Namesake: Baddeck, Nova Scotia
- Operator: Royal Canadian Navy
- Ordered: 22 January 1940
- Builder: Davie Shipbuilding, Lauzon
- Laid down: 14 August 1940
- Launched: 20 November 1940
- Commissioned: 18 May 1941
- Out of service: 4 July 1945
- Renamed: Efthai in 1947; Yusuf Z. Alireza in 1948; Evi in 1955
- Identification: Pennant number: K147
- Honours and awards: Atlantic 1941–45, English Channel 1944–45, Normandy 1944
- Fate: Wrecked near Jeddah on 11 March 1966
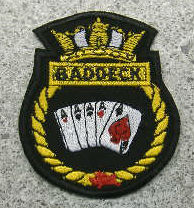
- Badge

General characteristics
- Class & type: Flower-class corvette
- Displacement: 925 long tons (940 t; 1,036 short tons)
- Length: 205 ft (62.48 m)o/a
- Beam: 33 ft (10.06 m)
- Draught: 11.5 ft (3.51 m)
- Propulsion: Single shaft; 2 × fire tube Scotch boilers; 1 × 4-cycle triple-expansion reciprocating steam engine; 2,750 ihp (2,050 kW)
- Speed: 16 knots (29.6 km/h)
- Range: 3,500 nautical miles (6,482 km) at 12 knots (22.2 km/h)
- Complement: 85
- Sensors & processing systems: 1 × SW1C or 2C radar; 1 × Type 123A or Type 127DV sonar
- Armament: 1 × BL 4-inch (101.6 mm) Mk.IX single gun; 2 × .50 cal machine gun (twin); 2 × Lewis .303 cal machine gun (twin); 2 × Mk.II depth charge throwers; 2 × depth charge rails with 40 depth charges; Originally fitted with minesweeping gear, later removed

HMCS Baddeck was a Flower-class corvette that served with the Royal Canadian Navy during the Second World War. She served in several theatres of operations during the war. After the war the ship was retired but the ship's name, pennant number and badge continue to be used by the K147 Baddeck Royal Canadian Sea Cadets Corps.

== Background ==
Flower-class corvettes like Baddeck serving with the Royal Canadian Navy during the Second World War were different from earlier and more traditional sail-driven corvettes. The "corvette" designation was created by the French as a class of small warships; the Royal Navy borrowed the term for a period but discontinued its use in 1877. During the hurried preparations for war in the late 1930s, Winston Churchill reactivated the corvette class, needing a name for smaller ships used in an escort capacity, in this case based on a whaling ship design. The generic name "flower" was used to designate the class of these ships, which – in the Royal Navy – were named after flowering plants.

Corvettes commissioned by the Royal Canadian Navy during the Second World War were named after communities for the most part, to better represent the people who took part in building them. This idea was put forth by Admiral Percy W. Nelles. Sponsors were commonly associated with the community for which the ship was named. Royal Navy corvettes were designed as open sea escorts, while Canadian corvettes were developed for coastal auxiliary roles which was exemplified by their minesweeping gear. Eventually the Canadian corvettes would be modified to allow them to perform better on the open seas.

== Construction ==
Named for the village of Baddeck, Nova Scotia, Baddeck was ordered on 22 January 1940 as part of the 1939–40 Flower-class building program. She was laid down on 14 August 1940 by Davie Shipbuilding and Repairing Co. Ltd. in Lauzon, Quebec and launched on 20 November 1940. Baddeck was commissioned at Quebec City on 18 May 1941. During her service life, she was sent to or held in port on several occasions due to her unreliable engine. After her engine failed for the third time in late 1941, she underwent major repairs during the first half of 1942 to fix the problem.

== Wartime career ==
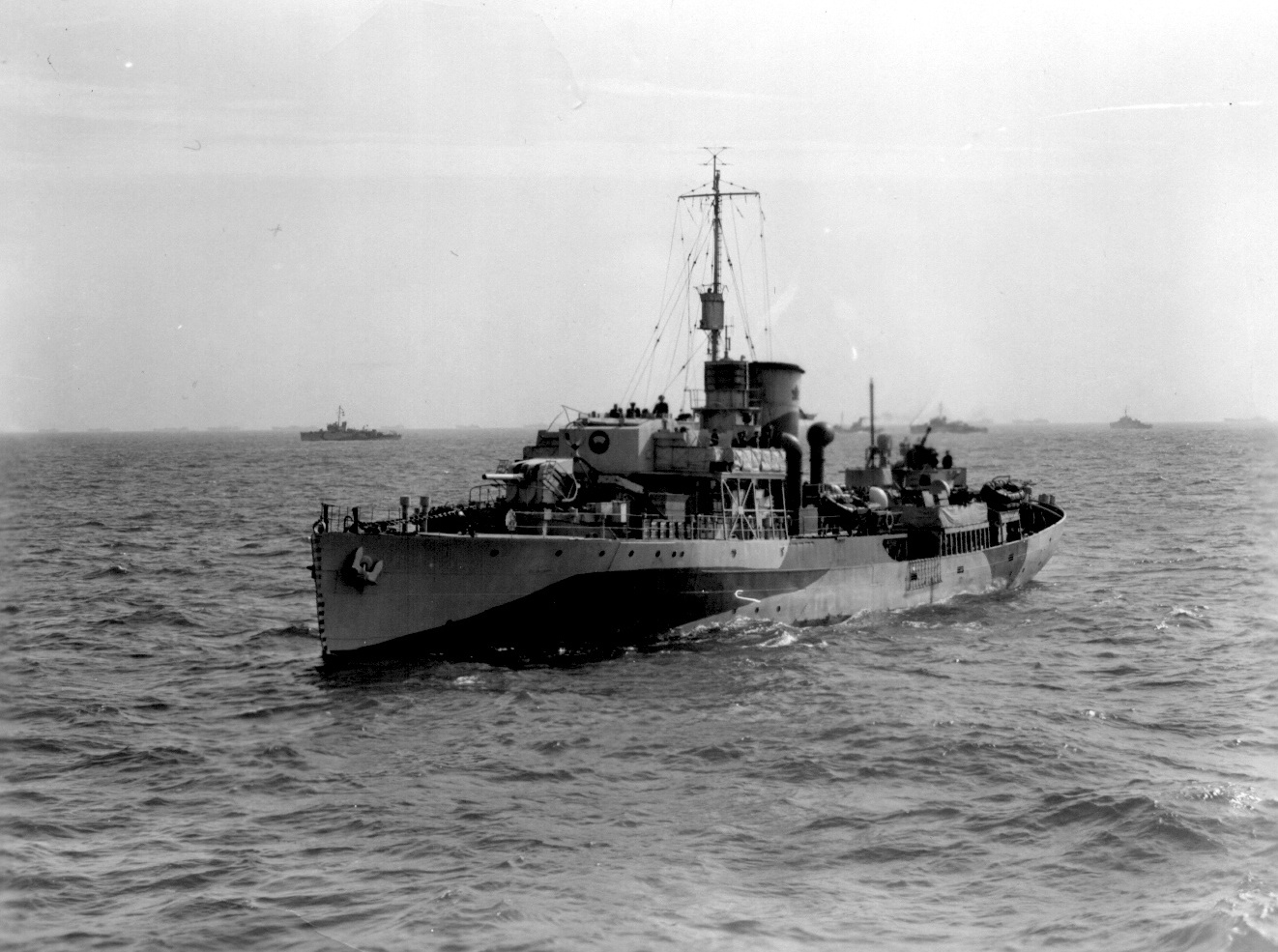
HMCS Baddeck in 1944

After commissioning, Baddeck' was sent to Halifax on 29 May 1941. In June 1941 the ship was tasked with escorting SS Lady Rodney from Quebec City to Halifax, but was forced to return to her builders following an engine breakdown. In September 1941, she managed to escort the SS Lady Rodney from Halifax to Jamaica despite again experiencing engine failure. After her repairs were completed she was sent to Newfoundland to serve as an ocean escort.

On 5 October 1941 the ship escorted convoy SC 48 from Sydney, Nova Scotia to Iceland. Nine ships were lost to German U-boat attacks near Greenland. On 17 October 1941 HMCS Baddeck rescued two survivors of the Norwegian merchant ship Barfonn after she had been sunk by the German submarine U-432. In late 1941 her engines again proved unreliable, and until mid-December she was kept at Hvalfjord, Iceland for repairs. After her work up in June 1942 she served with the Western Local Escort Force (WLEF) until November. In November 1942 the ship arrived in Derry, Northern Ireland and escorted Mediterranean-bound convoys from the United Kingdom for four months. In April 1943 she was assigned to escort group C-4 for two round trips across the Atlantic before transferring back to WLEF in mid-July as part of escort group W-2. In August 1943 the ship underwent a major retrofit at Liverpool, Nova Scotia where her fo'c'sle was extended. She stayed with WLEF until March 1944.

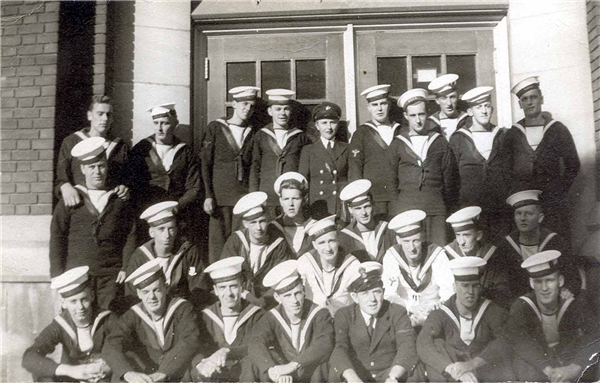
The crew in 1943

In March 1944 Baddeck was part of the Royal Navy escort group EG-9 based out of Derry, Northern Ireland. In April 1944 the ship was based in Portsmouth as part of Western Approaches Command tasked with invasion escort duties. She was involved in the D-Day landings as part of Operation Neptune. While acting as an invasion escort on 13 June 1944 the ship repulsed an attack by motor torpedo boats.

In September 1944 she was assigned to Nore Command based at Sheerness. On 24 May 1945 Baddeck was sent home as her final duty during the war.

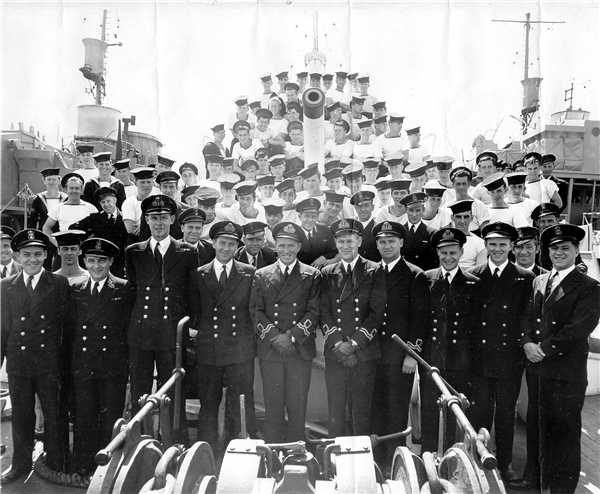
The ship's crew

== Post-war career ==
Paid off on 4 July 1945 at Sorel, Quebec, Baddeck was sold into civilian service, becoming the mercantile Efthania in 1947 with a gross register tonnage of 771 tons. She was renamed Yusuf Z. Alireza in 1948 (also spelt Yousef Z. Alireza). In 1954, the ship was renamed Al Mansour, and again in 1955 as Radwa. In 1965 she was renamed Evi and sailed under the Greek flag. She ran aground and was wrecked in the Red Sea 4 nmi (7.4 km; 4.6 mi) north of Jeddah, Saudi Arabia, on 11 March 1966. The ship was broken up in 1966.

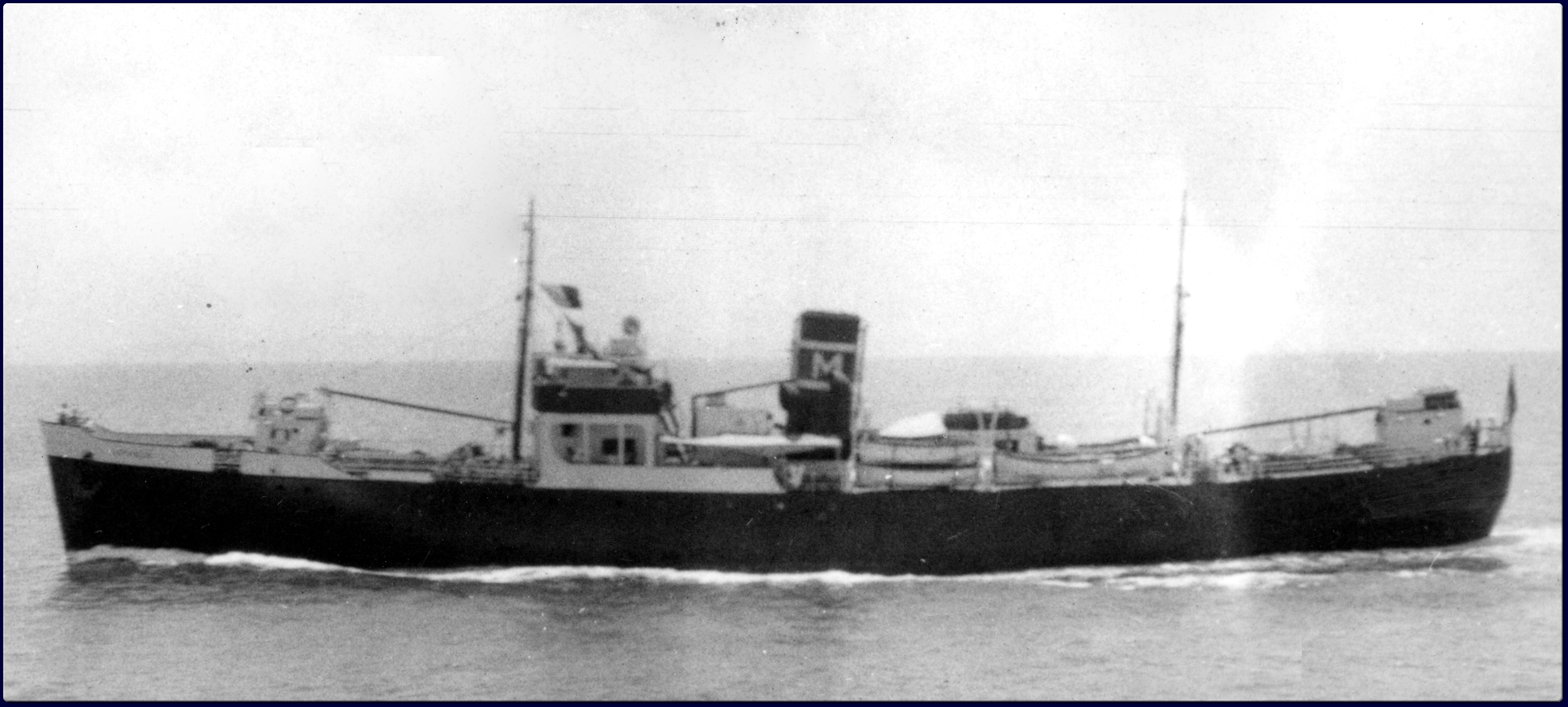
SS Efthania circa 1947

The ship's builder's plate is on display at Royal Canadian Legion Branch 53 Nova Scotia/Nunavut Command in Baddeck, Nova Scotia.
